= Vital Cuinet =

French geographer and orientalist (1833–1896)

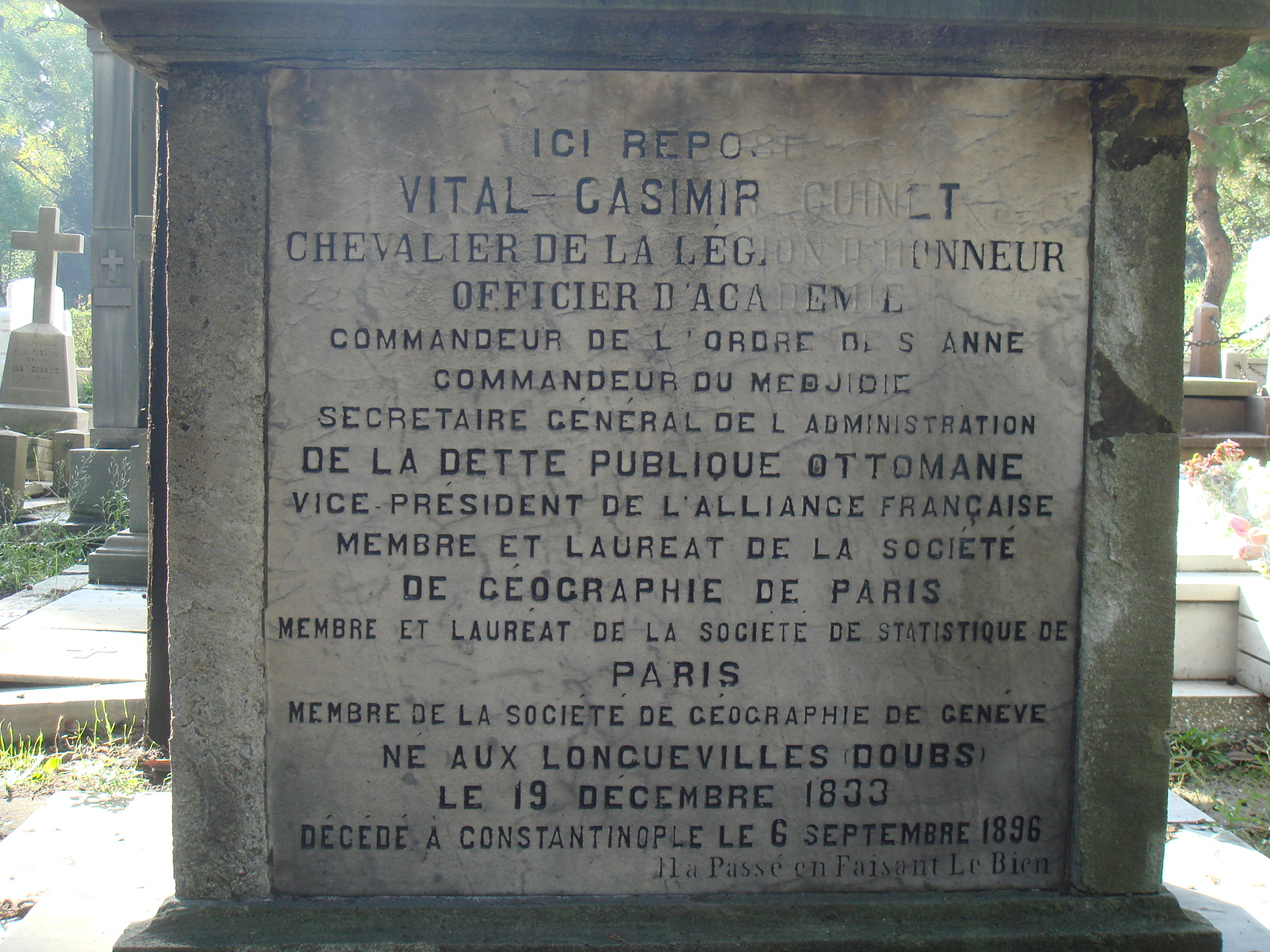
Tomb of Vital Cuinet in Istanbul

Vital-Casimir Cuinet, commonly known as Vital Cuinet (December 19, 1833 in Longeville – September 6, 1896 in Istanbul) was a French geographer and orientalist. He is best known for his work La Turquie d'Asie, géographie administrative: statistique, descriptive et raisonnée de chaque province de l'Asie Mineure, which addresses the socio-economic situation of the Ottoman Empire in Asia.

== Work ==
His figures were also used to establish the ability of the Ottoman Empire to pay its debts, Cuinet eager to get precise numbers was finally forced to conclude that it was not possible to get them, he gives two main reasons for this.

1. The limitations imposed by the Turkish authorities made his researches inconclusive.
2. Because of the lack of control of the Turkish authorities for farther provinces, it was impossible for him to complete his work.

An example often referred by the critics, was Cuinet's statistics drawn from Ottoman authority numbers and information that they provided him regarding the Vilayet of Aleppo (classified in those works as the sandjak of Marash). The number is an impossible 4,300. While only in the city of Marash, the Catholic and Protestant Armenians were numbering 6,008, and this without including the Gregorians. Cuinet at the beginning of his work, cautioned the reader by declaring: "The science of statistics so worthy and interesting, not only still is not used in this country but even the authorities refuses, with a party line, to accept any investigation."
