= Tournan =

Tournan is the name of several communes of France:

- Tournan, Gers, in the Gers department
- Tournan-en-Brie, in the Seine-et-Marne department

== See also ==
- Tournans, in the Doubs department
