= Puessans =

- Commune
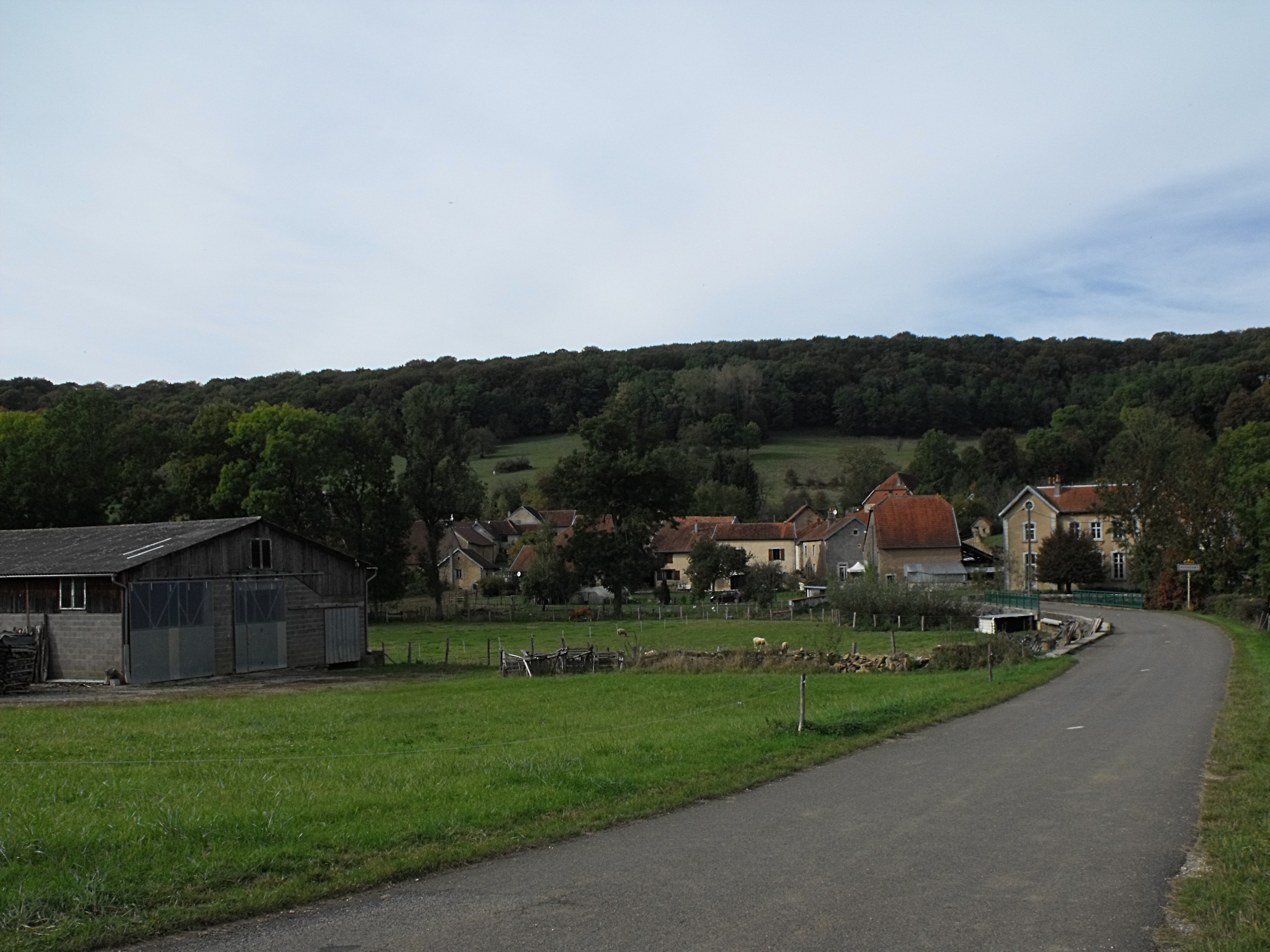
- A general view of Puessans
- Location of Puessans
- Location within France Location within Bourgogne-Franche-Comté
- Coordinates: 47°25′50″N 6°19′26″E
- Country: France
- Region: Bourgogne-Franche-Comté
- Department: Doubs
- Arrondissement: Besançon
- Canton: Baume-les-Dames

Government
  - Mayor (2020–2026): Jean Pierre Vaillet
- Area^{1}: 3.59 km^{2} (1.39 sq mi)
- Highest elevation: 424 m (1,391 ft)
- Lowest elevation: 272 m (892 ft)
- Population (2023): 32
  - Density: 8.9/km^{2} (23/sq mi)
- Time zone: UTC+01:00 (CET)
  - Summer (DST): UTC+02:00 (CEST)
- INSEE/Postal code: 25472 /25680
- ^{1} French Land Register data, which excludes lakes, ponds, glaciers > 1 km^{2} (0.386 sq mi or 247 acres) and river estuaries.

Puessans (French pronunciation: [pɥesɑ̃]) is a commune in the Doubs department in the Bourgogne-Franche-Comté region in eastern France.

== Geography ==
Puessans lies 8 km (5.0 mi) south of Rougemont. It nestles at the foot of a hill in the Val-Mont-Martin.

== Population ==
Historical population
Year	Pop.	±% p.a.
1968	43	—
1975	41	−0.68%
1982	43	+0.68%
1990	42	−0.29%
1999	42	+0.00%
2007	41	−0.30%
2012	40	−0.49%
2017	31	−4.97%
2023	32	+0.53%
Source: INSEE

== Economy ==
Puessans has remained primarily agricultural.

== See also ==
- Communes of the Doubs department
