= Mondon =

- Commune
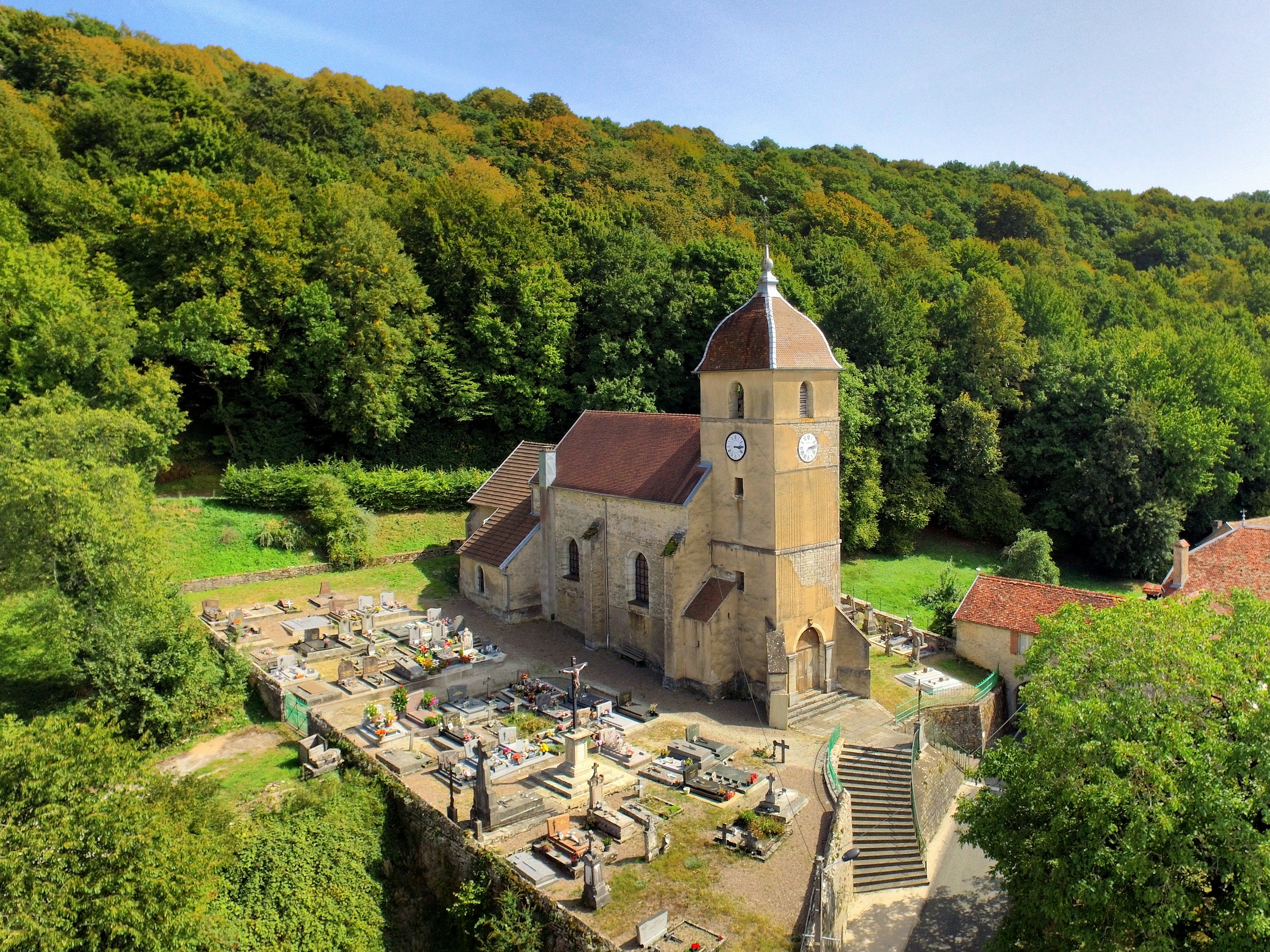
- The church of Mondon
- Location of Mondon
- Location within France Location within Bourgogne-Franche-Comté
- Coordinates: 47°26′30″N 6°18′45″E
- Country: France
- Region: Bourgogne-Franche-Comté
- Department: Doubs
- Arrondissement: Besançon
- Canton: Baume-les-Dames

Government
  - Mayor (2020–2026): Emmanuel Spadetto
- Area^{1}: 4.5 km^{2} (1.7 sq mi)
- Highest elevation: 417 m (1,368 ft)
- Lowest elevation: 260 m (850 ft)
- Population (2023): 77
  - Density: 17/km^{2} (44/sq mi)
- Time zone: UTC+01:00 (CET)
  - Summer (DST): UTC+02:00 (CEST)
- INSEE/Postal code: 25384 /25680
- ^{1} French Land Register data, which excludes lakes, ponds, glaciers > 1 km^{2} (0.386 sq mi or 247 acres) and river estuaries.

Mondon (French pronunciation: [mɔ̃dɔ̃]) is a commune in the Doubs department in the Bourgogne-Franche-Comté region in eastern France.

== Geography ==
Mondon lies 6 km (3.7 mi) south of Rougemont on a sunny slope. Above the village, there is a view toward the Vosges mountains and the Ballon de Servance.

== Population ==
Historical population
Year	Pop.	±% p.a.
1968	89	—
1975	69	−3.57%
1982	67	−0.42%
1990	77	+1.75%
1999	75	−0.29%
2007	74	−0.17%
2012	84	+2.57%
2017	96	+2.71%
2023	77	−3.61%
Source: INSEE

== See also ==
- Communes of the Doubs department
