= Goux-sous-Landet =

- Commune
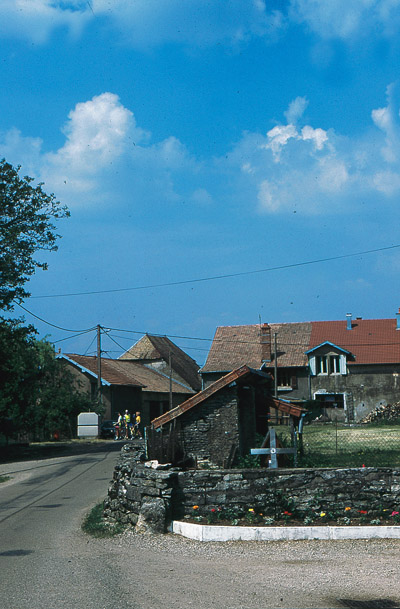
- Goux-sous-Landet
- Location of Goux-sous-Landet
- Location within France Location within Bourgogne-Franche-Comté
- Coordinates: 47°04′52″N 5°56′03″E
- Country: France
- Region: Bourgogne-Franche-Comté
- Department: Doubs
- Arrondissement: Besançon
- Canton: Saint-Vit

Government
  - Mayor (2020–2026): Patricia Paquiez-Guyetant
- Area^{1}: 5.42 km^{2} (2.09 sq mi)
- Highest elevation: 581 m (1,906 ft)
- Lowest elevation: 377 m (1,237 ft)
- Population (2023): 61
  - Density: 11/km^{2} (29/sq mi)
- Time zone: UTC+01:00 (CET)
  - Summer (DST): UTC+02:00 (CEST)
- INSEE/Postal code: 25283 /25440
- ^{1} French Land Register data, which excludes lakes, ponds, glaciers > 1 km^{2} (0.386 sq mi or 247 acres) and river estuaries.

Goux-sous-Landet (French pronunciation: [ɡu su lɑ̃dɛ]) is a commune in the Doubs department in the Bourgogne-Franche-Comté region in eastern France.

It is located on the D110 route, south of Courcelles.

== Population ==
Historical population
Year	Pop.	±% p.a.
1968	55	—
1975	54	−0.26%
1982	53	−0.27%
1990	56	+0.69%
1999	42	−3.15%
2007	48	+1.68%
2012	66	+6.58%
2017	71	+1.47%
2023	61	−2.50%
Source: INSEE

== See also ==
- Communes of the Doubs department
