= Romain, Doubs =

Romain
- Commune
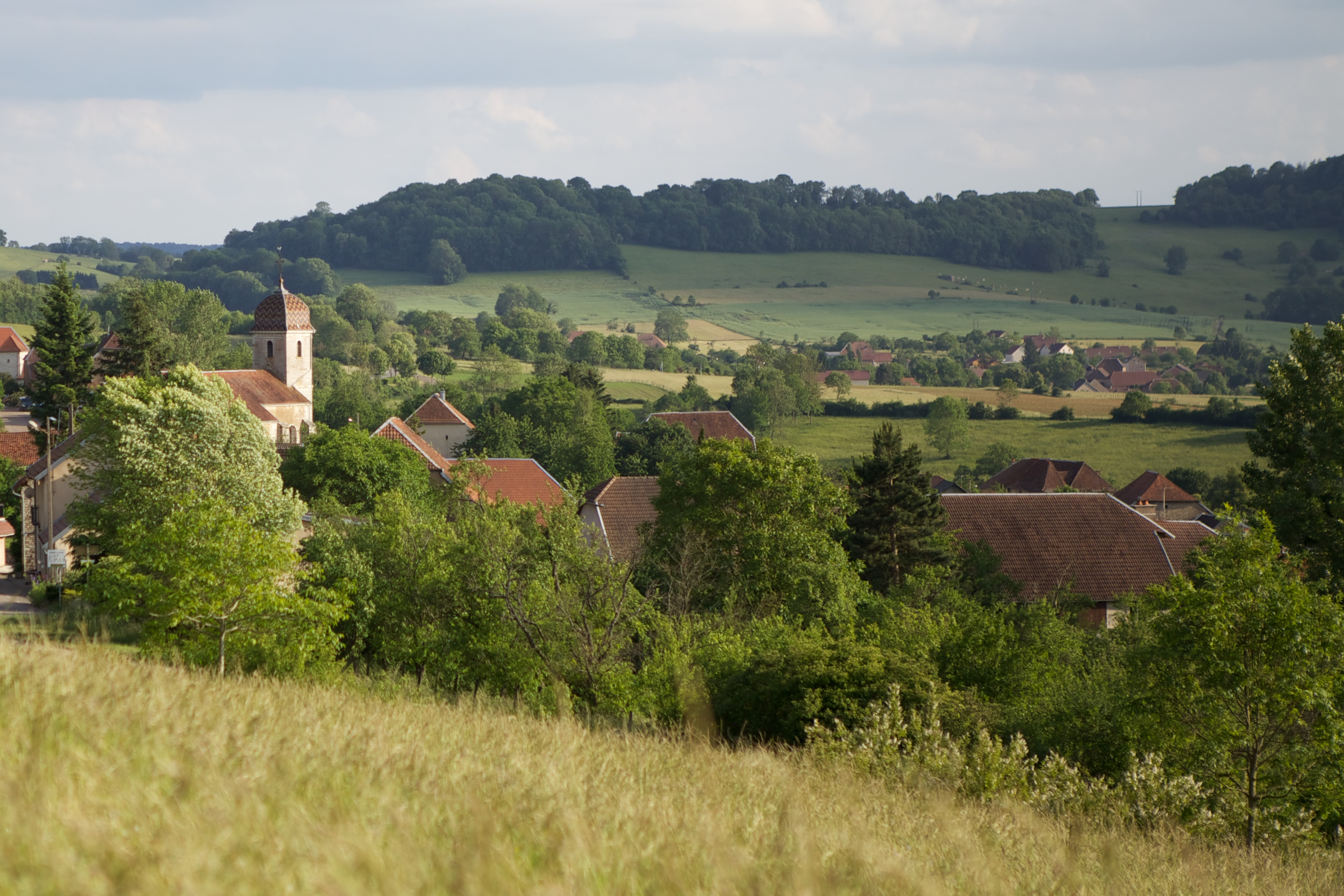
- A general view of Romain

- Coat of arms
- Location of Romain
- Location within France Location within Bourgogne-Franche-Comté
- Coordinates: 47°26′37″N 6°22′30″E
- Country: France
- Region: Bourgogne-Franche-Comté
- Department: Doubs
- Arrondissement: Besançon
- Canton: Baume-les-Dames

Government
  - Mayor (2020–2026): Sylvain Dubois
- Area^{1}: 4.85 km^{2} (1.87 sq mi)
- Highest elevation: 458 m (1,503 ft)
- Lowest elevation: 294 m (965 ft)
- Population (2023): 116
  - Density: 23.9/km^{2} (61.9/sq mi)
- Time zone: UTC+01:00 (CET)
  - Summer (DST): UTC+02:00 (CEST)
- INSEE/Postal code: 25499 /25680
- ^{1} French Land Register data, which excludes lakes, ponds, glaciers > 1 km^{2} (0.386 sq mi or 247 acres) and river estuaries.

Romain (French pronunciation: [ʁɔmɛ̃]; also Romain-la-Roche) is a commune in the Doubs department in the Bourgogne-Franche-Comté region in eastern France.

== Geography ==
Romain lies 6 km (3.7 mi) south of Rougemont on a plateau near the valley of the Doubs and the Ognon.

The Crotot cave has large galleries and stalactites.

== History ==
The commune was known as Romain-la-Roche until 1918.

== Population ==
Historical population
| Year | Pop. | ±% p.a. |
|---|---|---|
| 1968 | 75 | — |
| 1975 | 59 | −3.37% |
| 1982 | 69 | +2.26% |
| 1990 | 93 | +3.80% |
| 1999 | 99 | +0.70% |
| 2007 | 102 | +0.37% |
| 2012 | 115 | +2.43% |
| 2017 | 128 | +2.17% |
| 2023 | 116 | −1.63% |
Source: INSEE

== See also ==
- Communes of the Doubs department
