= Saint-Hilaire, Doubs =

Saint-Hilaire
- Commune
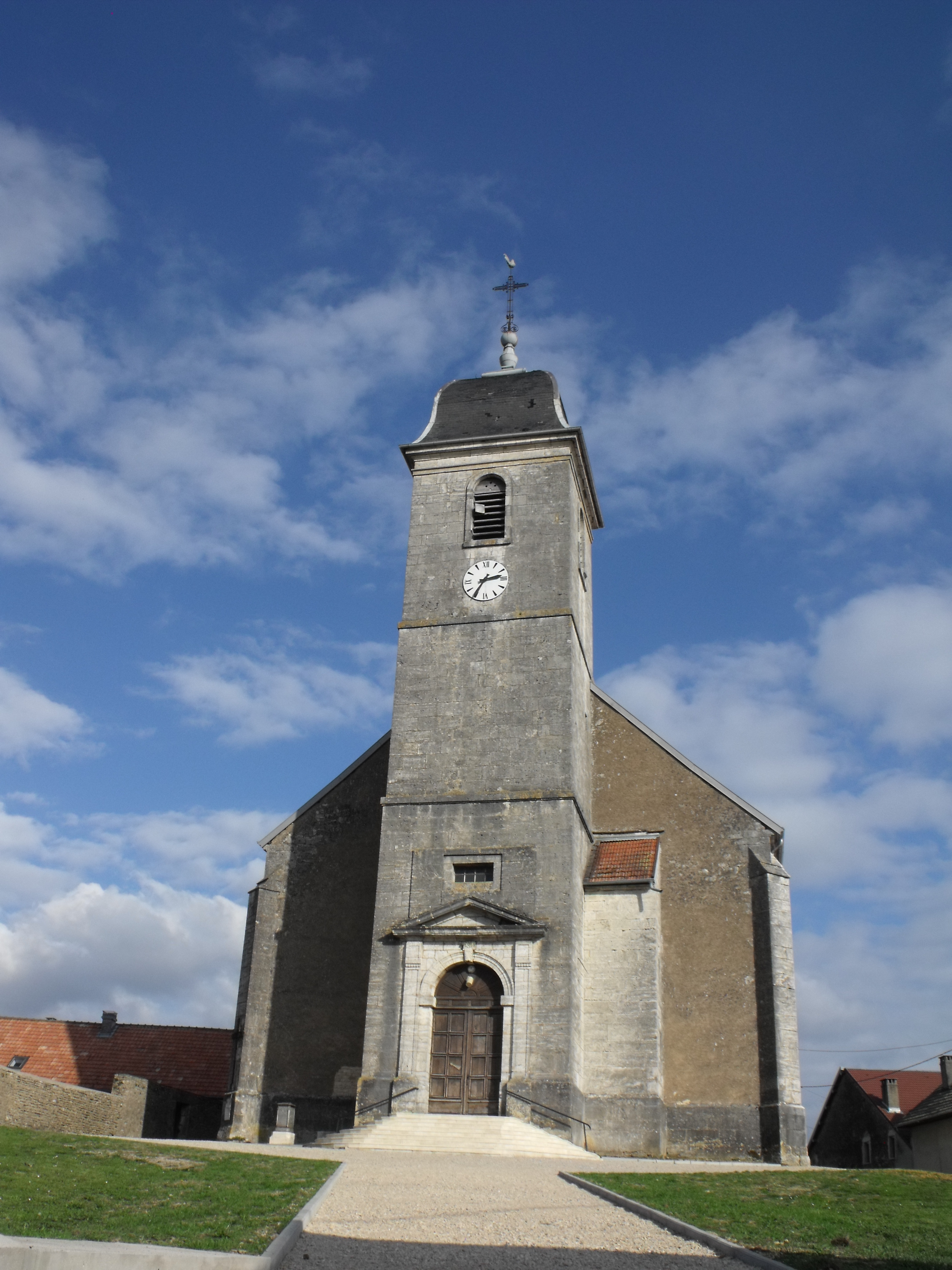
- The church in Saint-Hilaire
- Location of Saint-Hilaire
- Location within France Location within Bourgogne-Franche-Comté
- Coordinates: 47°20′09″N 6°14′33″E
- Country: France
- Region: Bourgogne-Franche-Comté
- Department: Doubs
- Arrondissement: Besançon
- Canton: Baume-les-Dames

Government
  - Mayor (2020–2026): Jean-Pierre Cornevaux
- Area^{1}: 2.64 km^{2} (1.02 sq mi)
- Highest elevation: 386 m (1,266 ft)
- Lowest elevation: 302 m (991 ft)
- Population (2023): 157
  - Density: 59.5/km^{2} (154/sq mi)
- Time zone: UTC+01:00 (CET)
  - Summer (DST): UTC+02:00 (CEST)
- INSEE/Postal code: 25518 /25640
- ^{1} French Land Register data, which excludes lakes, ponds, glaciers > 1 km^{2} (0.386 sq mi or 247 acres) and river estuaries.

Saint-Hilaire (French pronunciation: [sɛ̃.t‿ilɛʁ]) is a commune in the Doubs department in the Bourgogne-Franche-Comté region in eastern France.

== Geography ==
The commune lies 5 km (3.1 mi) north of Roulans.

== Population ==
Historical population
Year	Pop.	±% p.a.
1968	56	—
1975	49	−1.89%
1982	59	+2.69%
1990	48	−2.55%
1999	59	+2.32%
2007	140	+11.41%
2012	162	+2.96%
2017	160	−0.25%
2023	157	−0.31%
Source: INSEE

== See also ==
- Communes of the Doubs department
