= Séchin =

- Commune
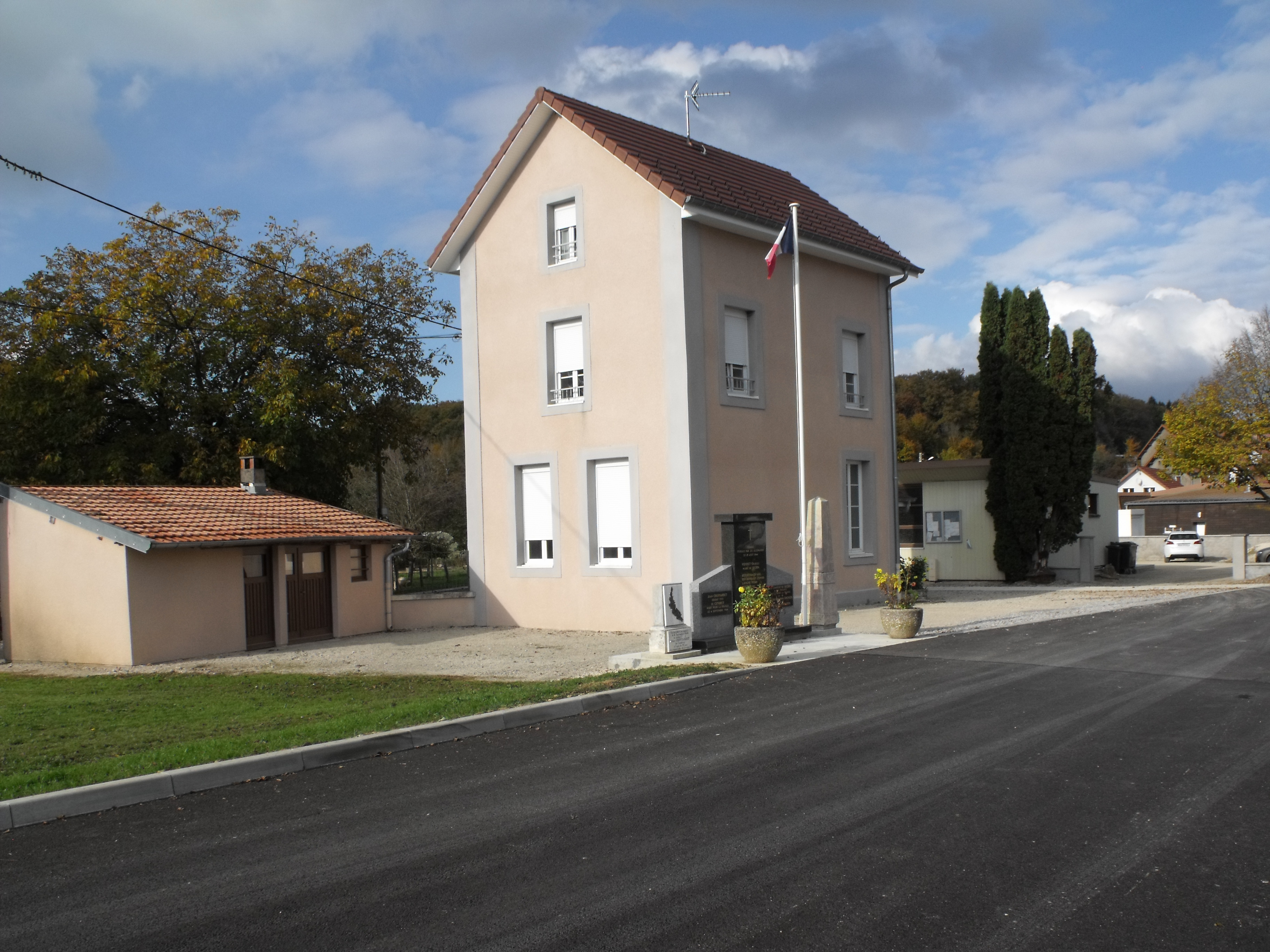
- The town hall in Séchin
- Location of Séchin
- Location within France Location within Bourgogne-Franche-Comté
- Coordinates: 47°20′16″N 6°17′07″E
- Country: France
- Region: Bourgogne-Franche-Comté
- Department: Doubs
- Arrondissement: Besançon
- Canton: Baume-les-Dames

Government
  - Mayor (2025–2026): Thierry Martinez
- Area^{1}: 1.09 km^{2} (0.42 sq mi)
- Highest elevation: 398 m (1,306 ft)
- Lowest elevation: 332 m (1,089 ft)
- Population (2023): 114
  - Density: 105/km^{2} (271/sq mi)
- Time zone: UTC+01:00 (CET)
  - Summer (DST): UTC+02:00 (CEST)
- INSEE/Postal code: 25538 /25110
- ^{1} French Land Register data, which excludes lakes, ponds, glaciers > 1 km^{2} (0.386 sq mi or 247 acres) and river estuaries.

Séchin (French pronunciation: [seʃɛ̃]) is a commune in the Doubs department in the Bourgogne-Franche-Comté region in eastern France.

== Geography ==
The commune lies 4 km (2.5 mi) northeast of Roulans.

== History ==
The village was burned in 1944 in reprisal for an attack on a German convoy. It was rebuilt in the early 1950s.

== Population ==
Historical population
Year	Pop.	±% p.a.
1968	41	—
1975	54	+4.01%
1982	100	+9.20%
1990	94	−0.77%
1999	108	+1.55%
2007	127	+2.05%
2012	137	+1.53%
2017	113	−3.78%
2023	114	+0.15%
Source: INSEE

== See also ==
- Communes of the Doubs department
