= Tressandans =

- Commune
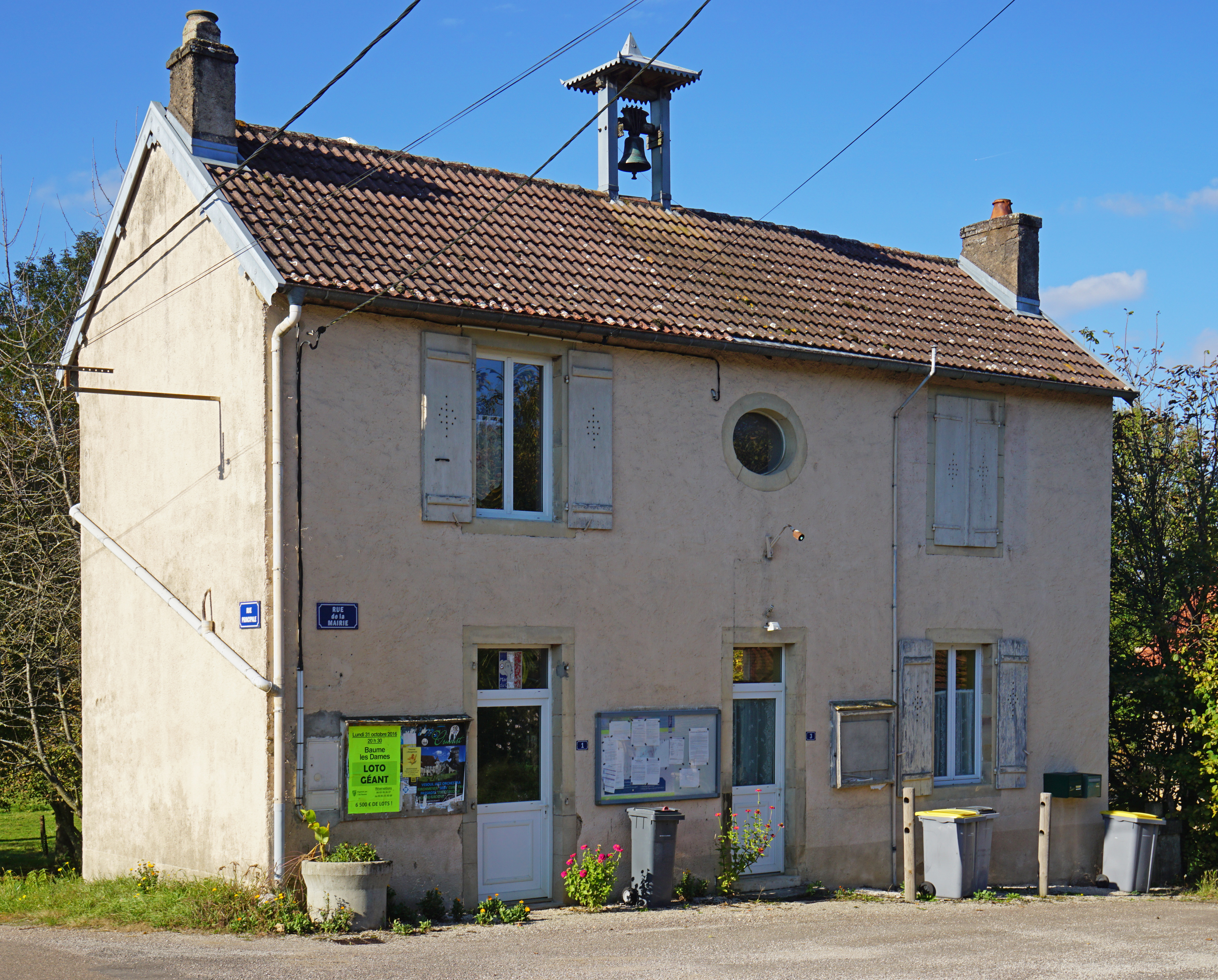
- The town hall in Tressandans
- Location of Tressandans
- Location within France Location within Bourgogne-Franche-Comté
- Coordinates: 47°29′56″N 6°20′07″E
- Country: France
- Region: Bourgogne-Franche-Comté
- Department: Doubs
- Arrondissement: Besançon
- Canton: Baume-les-Dames
- Intercommunality: Pays de Villersexel

Government
  - Mayor (2020–2026): Thierry Maire
- Area^{1}: 2.34 km^{2} (0.90 sq mi)
- Highest elevation: 295 m (968 ft)
- Lowest elevation: 248 m (814 ft)
- Population (2023): 28
  - Density: 12/km^{2} (31/sq mi)
- Time zone: UTC+01:00 (CET)
  - Summer (DST): UTC+02:00 (CEST)
- INSEE/Postal code: 25570 /25680
- ^{1} French Land Register data, which excludes lakes, ponds, glaciers > 1 km^{2} (0.386 sq mi or 247 acres) and river estuaries.

Tressandans (French pronunciation: [tʁɛsɑ̃dɑ̃]) is a commune in the Doubs department in the Bourgogne-Franche-Comté region of eastern France.

== Geography ==
Tressandans lies 2.5 km (1.6 mi) northwest of Rougemont on the banks of the Ognon. It lies on the border of the department of Haute-Saône.

== Population ==
Historical population
Year	Pop.	±% p.a.
1968	49	—
1975	32	−5.91%
1982	27	−2.40%
1990	27	+0.00%
1999	30	+1.18%
2007	36	+2.31%
2012	36	+0.00%
2017	23	−8.57%
2023	28	+3.33%
Source: INSEE

== See also ==
- Communes of the Doubs department
