= Nans, Doubs =

Nans
- Commune
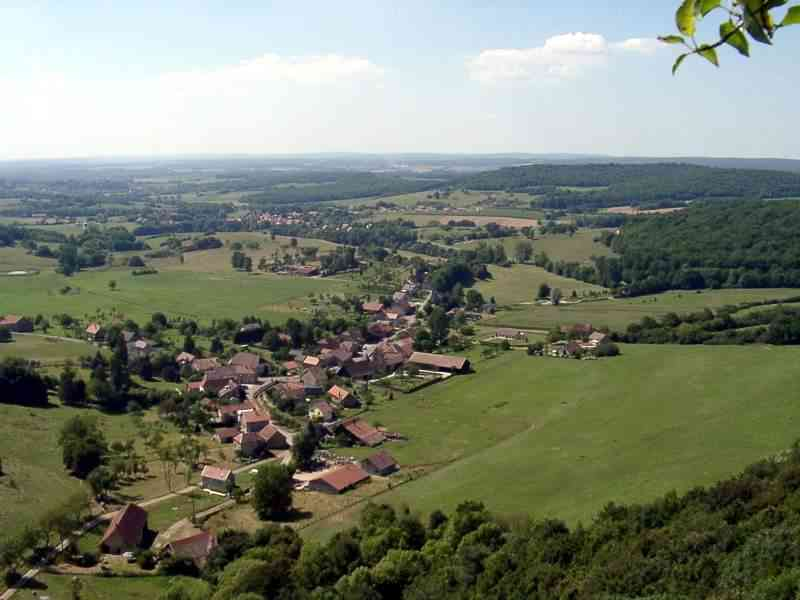
- Nans, from Les Roches

- Coat of arms
- Location of Nans
- Location within France Location within Bourgogne-Franche-Comté
- Coordinates: 47°28′45″N 6°25′07″E
- Country: France
- Region: Bourgogne-Franche-Comté
- Department: Doubs
- Arrondissement: Besançon
- Canton: Baume-les-Dames

Government
  - Mayor (2020–2026): Daniel Menier
- Area^{1}: 3.2 km^{2} (1.2 sq mi)
- Highest elevation: 452 m (1,483 ft)
- Lowest elevation: 288 m (945 ft)
- Population (2023): 96
  - Density: 30/km^{2} (78/sq mi)
- Time zone: UTC+01:00 (CET)
  - Summer (DST): UTC+02:00 (CEST)
- INSEE/Postal code: 25419 /25684
- ^{1} French Land Register data, which excludes lakes, ponds, glaciers > 1 km^{2} (0.386 sq mi or 247 acres) and river estuaries.

Nans is a commune in the Doubs department in the Bourgogne-Franche-Comté region in eastern France.

== Geography ==
Nans lies 5 km (3.1 mi) from Rougemont at the foot of a high, horseshoe-shaped cliff.

== Population ==
Historical population
Year	Pop.	±% p.a.
1968	89	—
1975	91	+0.32%
1982	99	+1.21%
1990	95	−0.51%
1999	88	−0.85%
2007	82	−0.88%
2012	94	+2.77%
2017	100	+1.25%
2023	96	−0.68%
Source: INSEE

== See also ==
- Communes of the Doubs department
