= Le Puy, Doubs =

Le Puy
- Commune
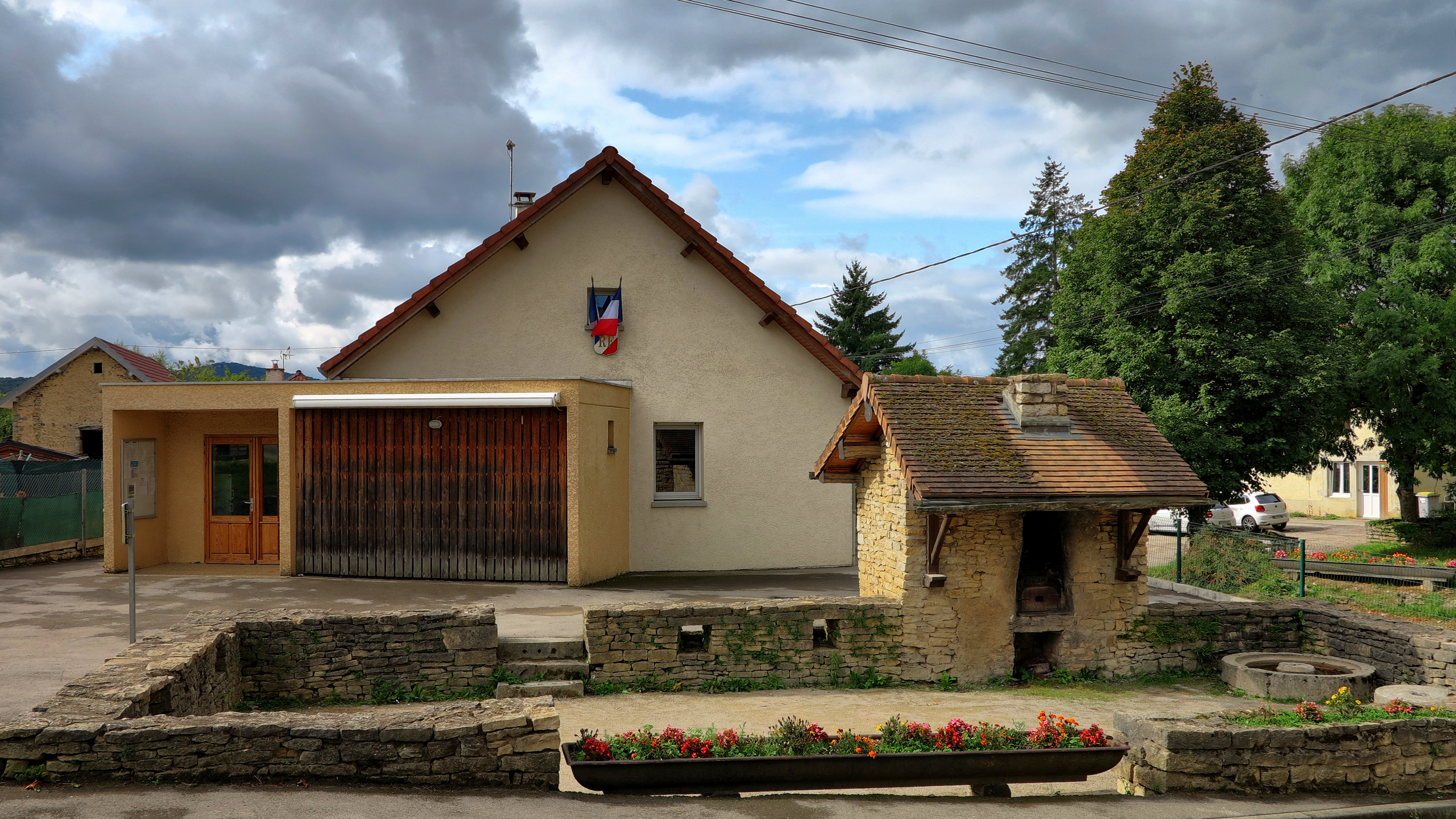
- The town hall in Le Puy
- Location of Le Puy
- Location within France Location within Bourgogne-Franche-Comté
- Coordinates: 47°20′46″N 6°13′44″E
- Country: France
- Region: Bourgogne-Franche-Comté
- Department: Doubs
- Arrondissement: Besançon
- Canton: Baume-les-Dames

Government
  - Mayor (2020–2026): Christophe Guglielmetti
- Area^{1}: 3.42 km^{2} (1.32 sq mi)
- Elevation: 300 m (980 ft)
- Highest elevation: 375 m (1,230 ft)
- Lowest elevation: 297 m (974 ft)
- Population (2023): 104
  - Density: 30.4/km^{2} (78.8/sq mi)
- Time zone: UTC+01:00 (CET)
  - Summer (DST): UTC+02:00 (CEST)
- INSEE/Postal code: 25474 /25640
- ^{1} French Land Register data, which excludes lakes, ponds, glaciers > 1 km^{2} (0.386 sq mi or 247 acres) and river estuaries.

Le Puy (French pronunciation: [lə pɥi]) is a commune in the department of Doubs in the eastern French region of Bourgogne-Franche-Comté.

== Geography ==
The village of Le Puy lies 16 km (9.9 mi) from Besançon on Route D115 and 5 km (3.1 mi) north of Roulans. It is close to its intersection with the D336 on the east and the A36 on the west.

== Population ==
The inhabitants of Le Puy are known as Puylots.

Historical population
Year	Pop.	±% p.a.
1968	41	—
1975	35	−2.23%
1982	45	+3.66%
1990	48	+0.81%
1999	46	−0.47%
2007	66	+4.62%
2012	102	+9.10%
2017	112	+1.89%
2023	104	−1.23%
Source: INSEE

== Sights ==
The chapel of Notre-Dame de la Délivrance was erected in 1854 by the parishioners in thanksgiving to Our Lady for being spared from a cholera epidemic. An outdoor mass is celebrated on the Sunday nearest the Feast of the Immaculate Conception, 8 December each year.

== Etymology ==
The village is labeled le Puits (French: the Well) on the Cassini map. The French le Puy usually correlates to the Provençal word Puech (an isolated hill). Here, as the Cassini map shows, it refers to the local wells.

== See also ==
- Communes of the Doubs department
