= Ferrières-les-Bois =

- Commune
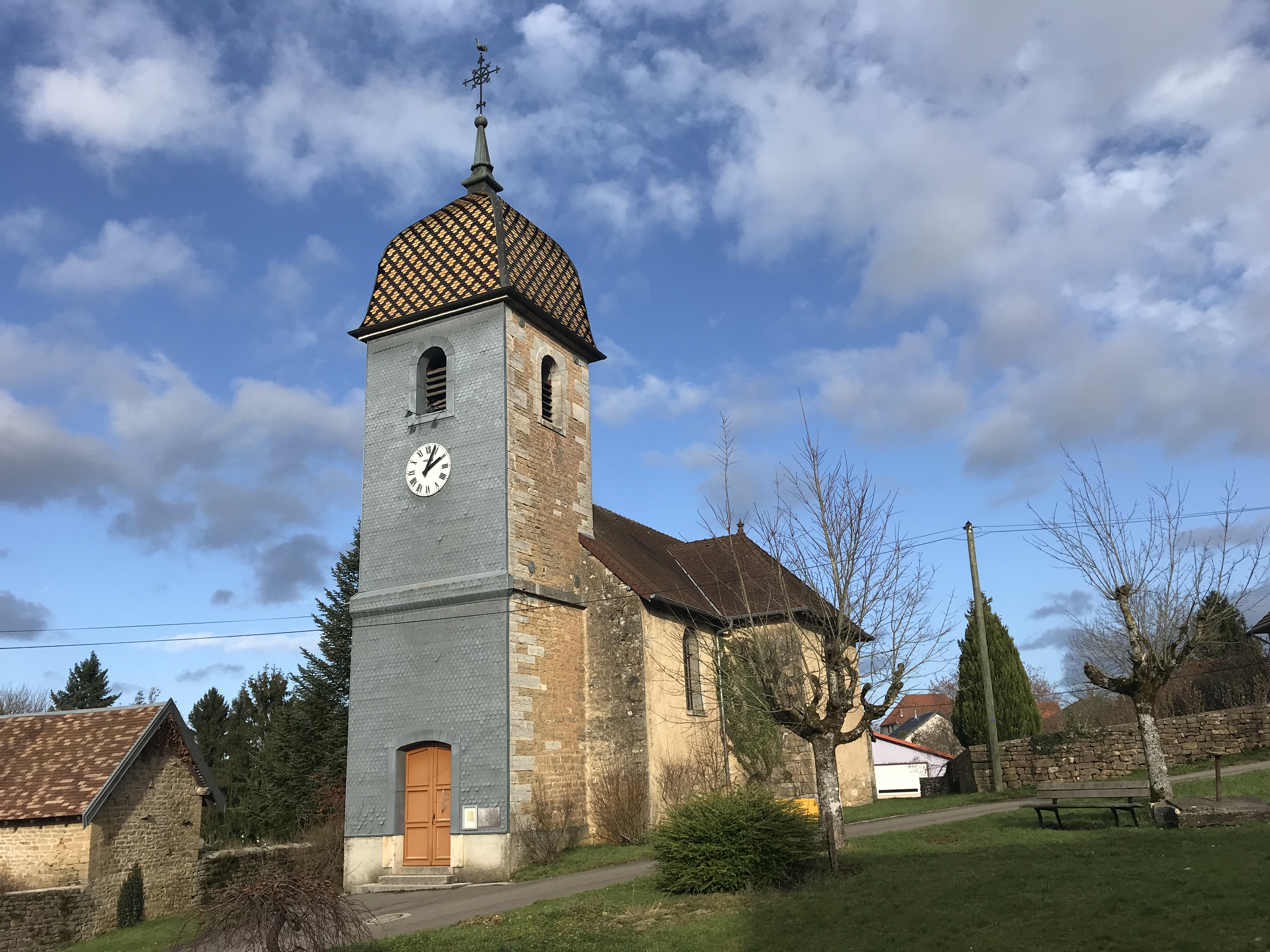
- The church in Ferrières-les-Bois

- Coat of arms
- Location of Ferrières-les-Bois
- Location within France Location within Bourgogne-Franche-Comté
- Coordinates: 47°12′18″N 5°48′13″E
- Country: France
- Region: Bourgogne-Franche-Comté
- Department: Doubs
- Arrondissement: Besançon
- Canton: Saint-Vit

Government
  - Mayor (2020–2026): Christian Tournier
- Area^{1}: 4.17 km^{2} (1.61 sq mi)
- Highest elevation: 302 m (991 ft)
- Lowest elevation: 224 m (735 ft)
- Population (2023): 328
  - Density: 78.7/km^{2} (204/sq mi)
- Time zone: UTC+01:00 (CET)
  - Summer (DST): UTC+02:00 (CEST)
- INSEE/Postal code: 25235 /25410
- ^{1} French Land Register data, which excludes lakes, ponds, glaciers > 1 km^{2} (0.386 sq mi or 247 acres) and river estuaries.

Ferrières-les-Bois (French pronunciation: [fɛʁjɛʁ le bwa]) is a commune in the Doubs department in the Bourgogne-Franche-Comté region in eastern France.

== Population ==
Historical population
Year	Pop.	±% p.a.
1968	111	—
1975	129	+2.17%
1982	244	+9.53%
1990	249	+0.25%
1999	258	+0.40%
2007	324	+2.89%
2012	318	−0.37%
2017	320	+0.13%
2023	328	+0.41%
Source: INSEE

== See also ==
- Communes of the Doubs department
