= Verne, Doubs =

Verne
- Commune
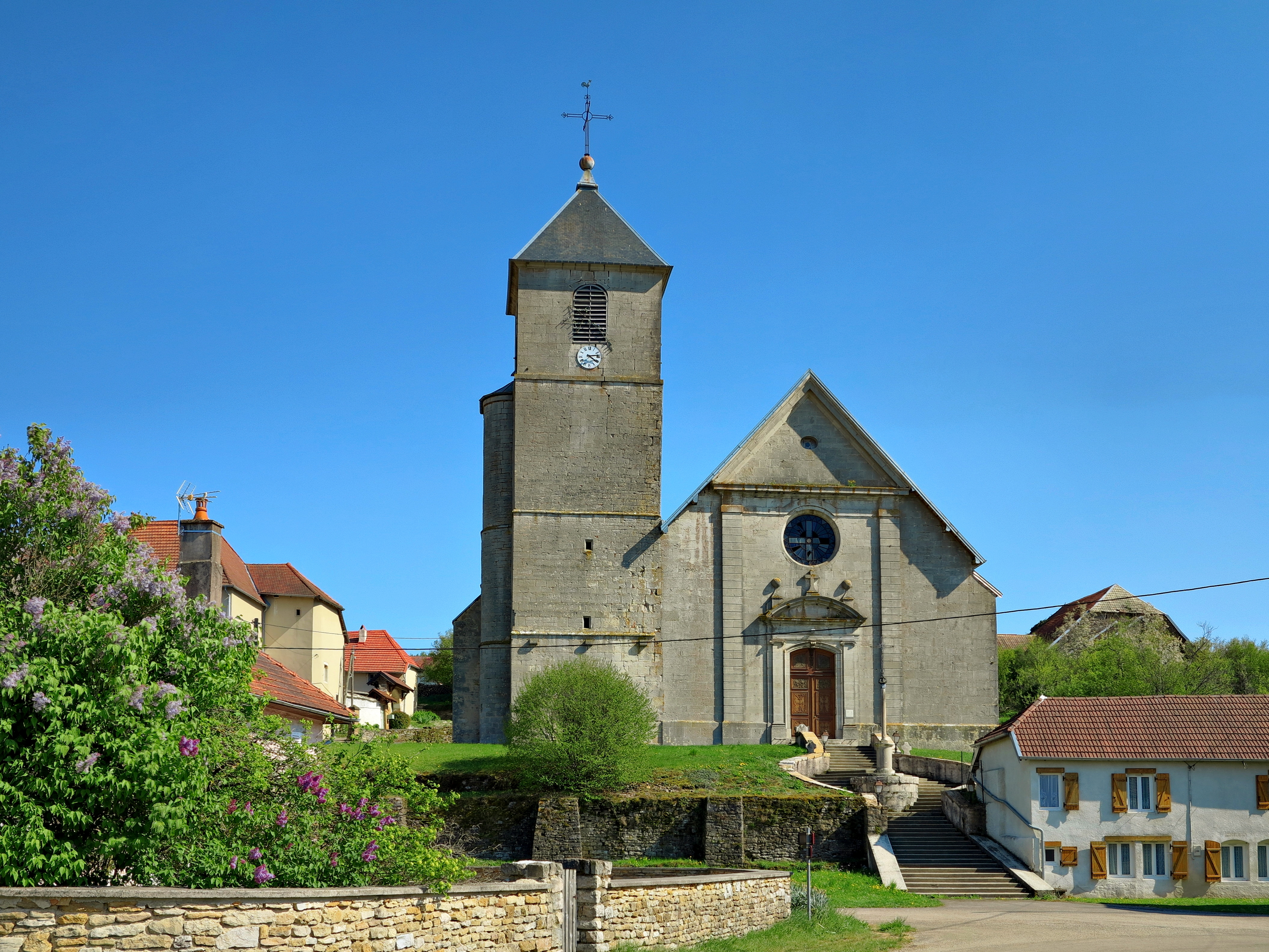
- The church in Verne

- Coat of arms
- Location of Verne
- Location within France Location within Bourgogne-Franche-Comté
- Coordinates: 47°23′56″N 6°21′16″E
- Country: France
- Region: Bourgogne-Franche-Comté
- Department: Doubs
- Arrondissement: Besançon
- Canton: Baume-les-Dames
- Intercommunality: Doubs Baumois

Government
  - Mayor (2020–2026): Denis Girardot
- Area^{1}: 7.82 km^{2} (3.02 sq mi)
- Highest elevation: 479 m (1,572 ft)
- Lowest elevation: 369 m (1,211 ft)
- Population (2023): 125
  - Density: 16.0/km^{2} (41.4/sq mi)
- Time zone: UTC+01:00 (CET)
  - Summer (DST): UTC+02:00 (CEST)
- INSEE/Postal code: 25604 /25110
- ^{1} French Land Register data, which excludes lakes, ponds, glaciers > 1 km^{2} (0.386 sq mi or 247 acres) and river estuaries.

Verne (French pronunciation: [vɛʁn]) is a commune in the Doubs department in the Bourgogne-Franche-Comté region in eastern France.

== Population ==
Historical population
Year	Pop.	±% p.a.
1968	126	—
1975	129	+0.34%
1982	119	−1.15%
1990	102	−1.91%
1999	120	+1.82%
2007	142	+2.13%
2012	129	−1.90%
2017	127	−0.31%
2023	125	−0.26%
Source: INSEE

== See also ==
- Communes of the Doubs department
