= Ougney-Douvot =

- Commune
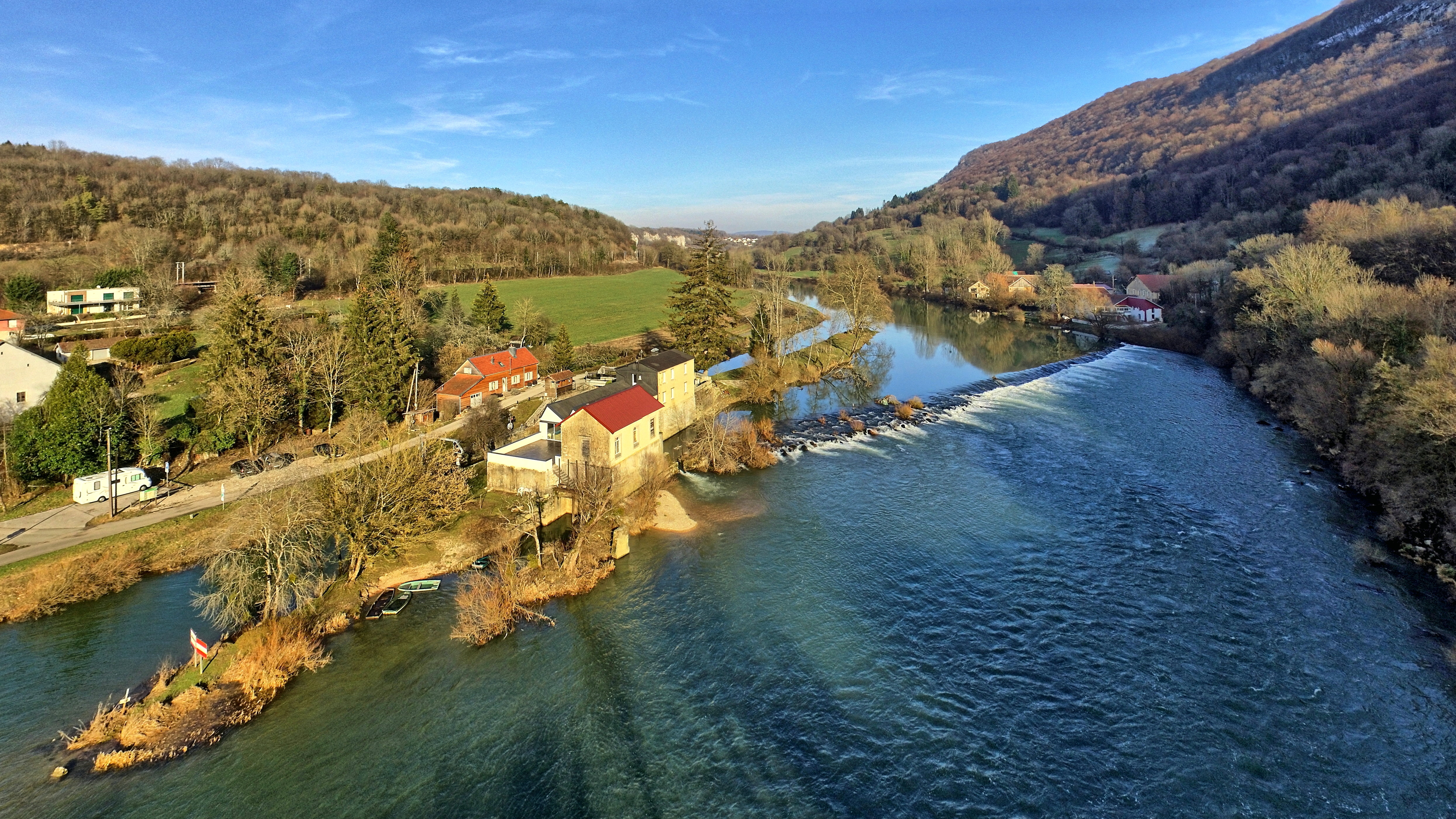
- The weir on the river Doubs in Ougney-Douvot
- Location of Ougney-Douvot
- Location within France Location within Bourgogne-Franche-Comté
- Coordinates: 47°18′43″N 6°15′32″E
- Country: France
- Region: Bourgogne-Franche-Comté
- Department: Doubs
- Arrondissement: Besançon
- Canton: Baume-les-Dames

Government
  - Mayor (2020–2026): Francis Trouillot
- Area^{1}: 6.56 km^{2} (2.53 sq mi)
- Highest elevation: 589 m (1,932 ft)
- Lowest elevation: 255 m (837 ft)
- Population (2023): 252
  - Density: 38.4/km^{2} (99.5/sq mi)
- Time zone: UTC+01:00 (CET)
  - Summer (DST): UTC+02:00 (CEST)
- INSEE/Postal code: 25439 /25640
- ^{1} French Land Register data, which excludes lakes, ponds, glaciers > 1 km^{2} (0.386 sq mi or 247 acres) and river estuaries.

Ougney-Douvot (French pronunciation: [uɲɛ duvo]) is a commune in the Doubs department in the Bourgogne-Franche-Comté region in eastern France.

== Population ==
Historical population
Year	Pop.	±% p.a.
1968	260	—
1975	212	−2.87%
1982	168	−3.27%
1990	159	−0.69%
1999	150	−0.65%
2007	175	+1.95%
2012	208	+3.52%
2017	253	+3.99%
2023	252	−0.07%
Source: INSEE

== See also ==
- Communes of the Doubs department
