= Villers-Saint-Martin =

- Commune
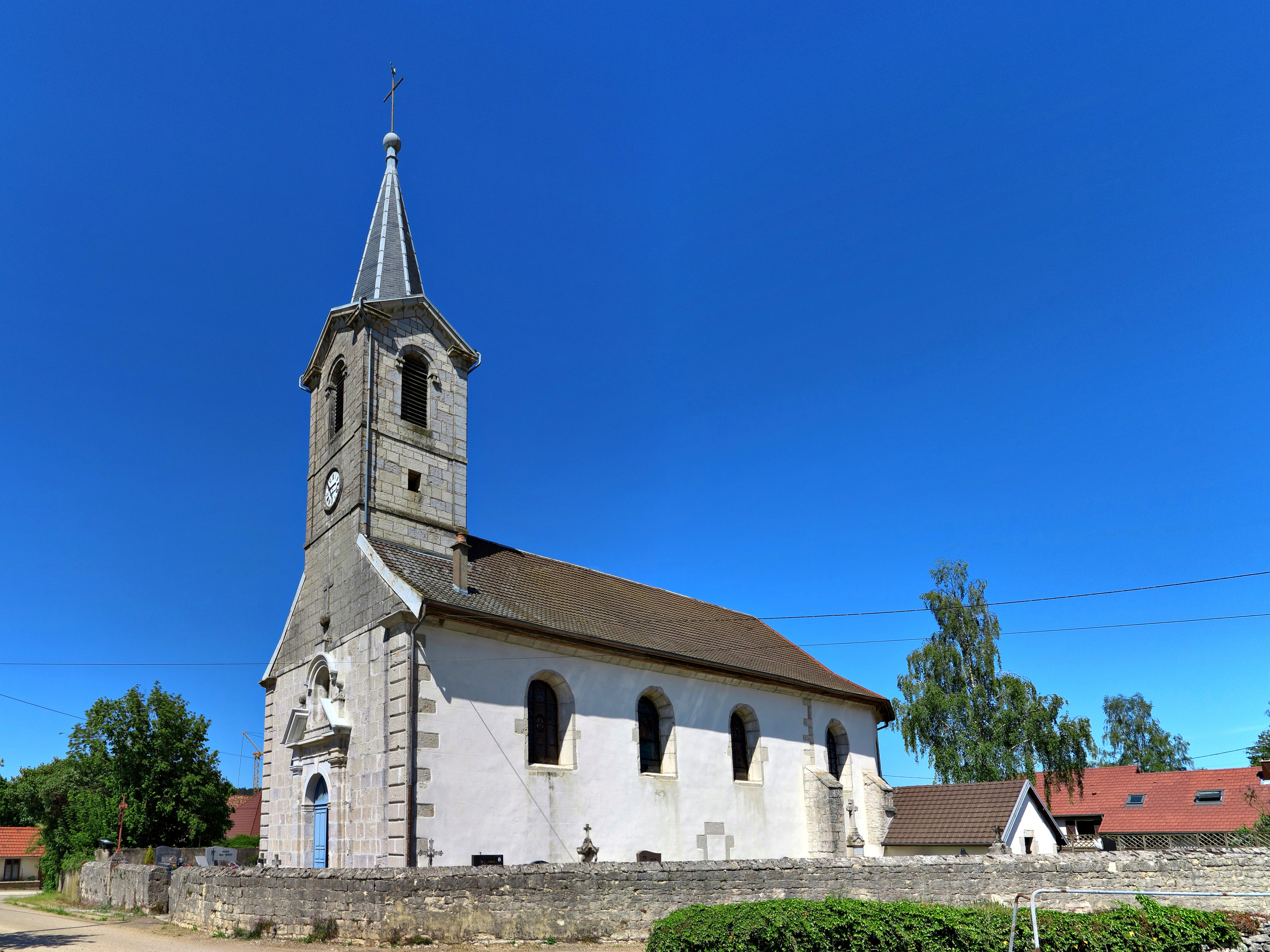
- The church in Villers-Saint-Martin
- Location of Villers-Saint-Martin
- Location within France Location within Bourgogne-Franche-Comté
- Coordinates: 47°20′37″N 6°24′36″E
- Country: France
- Region: Bourgogne-Franche-Comté
- Department: Doubs
- Arrondissement: Besançon
- Canton: Baume-les-Dames

Government
  - Mayor (2020–2026): Christian Retornaz
- Area^{1}: 8.90 km^{2} (3.44 sq mi)
- Highest elevation: 520 m (1,710 ft)
- Lowest elevation: 317 m (1,040 ft)
- Population (2023): 225
  - Density: 25.3/km^{2} (65.5/sq mi)
- Time zone: UTC+01:00 (CET)
  - Summer (DST): UTC+02:00 (CEST)
- INSEE/Postal code: 25626 /25110
- ^{1} French Land Register data, which excludes lakes, ponds, glaciers > 1 km^{2} (0.386 sq mi or 247 acres) and river estuaries.

Villers-Saint-Martin is a commune in the Doubs department in the Bourgogne-Franche-Comté region in eastern France.

== Geography ==
Villers-Saint-Martin is located in northeastern France, within the Doubs department in the Bourgogne‑Franche‑Comté region. The commune covers an area of 8.90 km², with elevations ranging from 317 meters to 520 meters above sea level. The area features gentle mountainous terrain, as it lies within the Jura Mountains, and its land is divided between agricultural areas and dense forests.

== Population ==
Historical population
Year	Pop.	±% p.a.
1968	116	—
1975	119	+0.37%
1982	161	+4.41%
1990	198	+2.62%
1999	190	−0.46%
2007	205	+0.95%
2012	222	+1.61%
2017	212	−0.92%
2023	225	+1.00%
Source: INSEE

== See also ==
- Communes of the Doubs department
