= Germondans =

- Commune
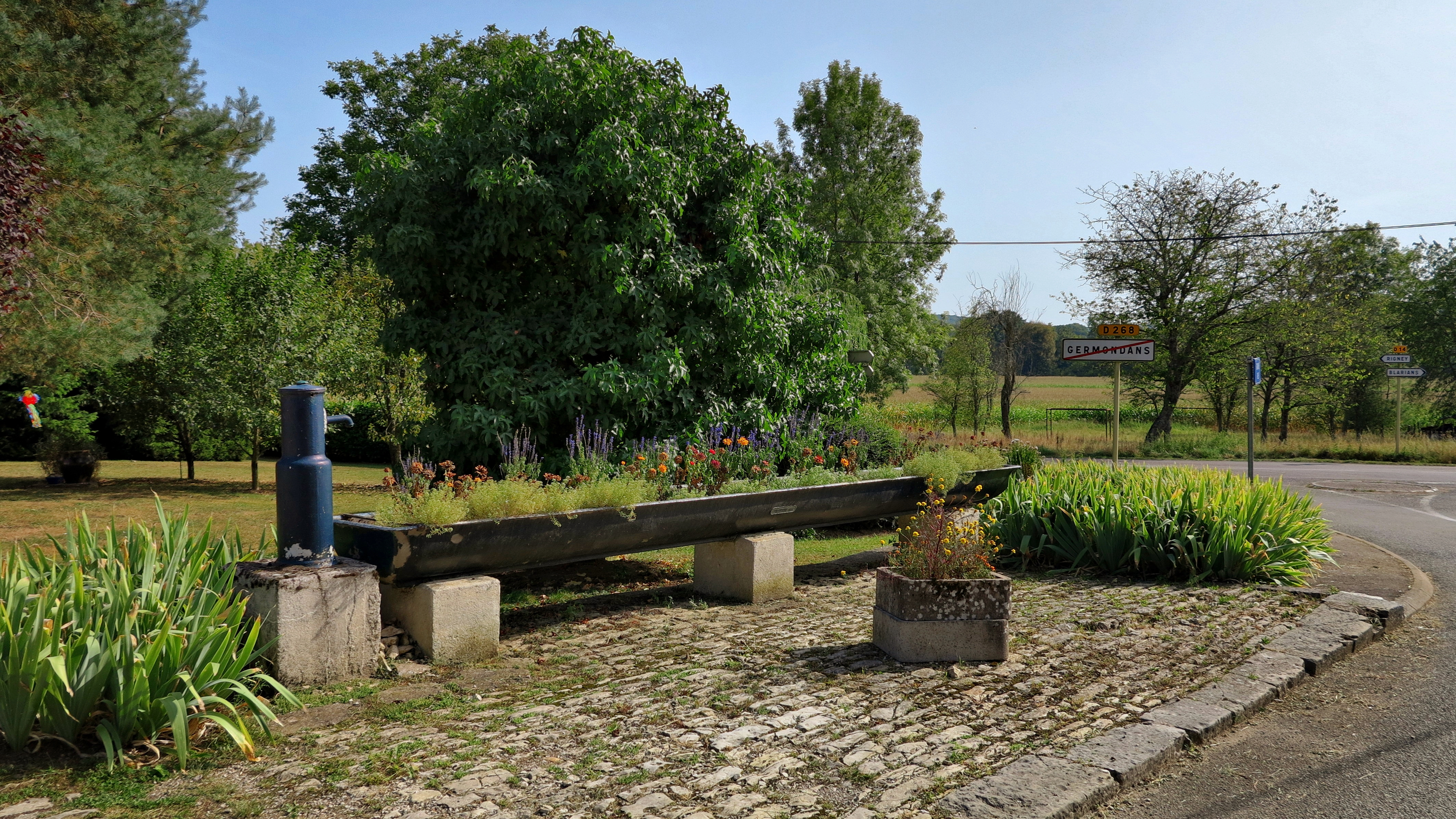
- The fountain in Germondans
- Location of Germondans
- Location within France Location within Bourgogne-Franche-Comté
- Coordinates: 47°24′36″N 6°11′29″E
- Country: France
- Region: Bourgogne-Franche-Comté
- Department: Doubs
- Arrondissement: Besançon
- Canton: Baume-les-Dames

Government
  - Mayor (2022–2026): Lydianne Josserand
- Area^{1}: 3.52 km^{2} (1.36 sq mi)
- Highest elevation: 282 m (925 ft)
- Lowest elevation: 227 m (745 ft)
- Population (2023): 57
  - Density: 16/km^{2} (42/sq mi)
- Time zone: UTC+01:00 (CET)
  - Summer (DST): UTC+02:00 (CEST)
- INSEE/Postal code: 25269 /25640
- ^{1} French Land Register data, which excludes lakes, ponds, glaciers > 1 km^{2} (0.386 sq mi or 247 acres) and river estuaries.

Germondans (French pronunciation: [ʒɛʁmɔ̃dɑ̃]) is a commune in the Doubs department in the Bourgogne-Franche-Comté region in eastern France.

== Population ==
Historical population
Year	Pop.	±% p.a.
1968	55	—
1975	49	−1.64%
1982	57	+2.18%
1990	64	+1.46%
1999	63	−0.17%
2007	74	+2.03%
2012	63	−3.17%
2017	60	−0.97%
2023	57	−0.85%
Source: INSEE

== See also ==
- Communes of the Doubs department
