= Communes of the Doubs department =

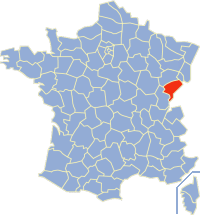

The following is a list of the 563 communes of the Doubs department of France.

The communes cooperate in the following intercommunalities (as of 2025):

- Grand Besançon Métropole
- Pays de Montbéliard Agglomération
- Communauté de communes Altitude 800
- Communauté de communes des Deux Vallées Vertes
- Communauté de communes du Doubs Baumois
- Communauté de communes entre Doubs et Loue
- Communauté de communes du Grand Pontarlier
- Communauté de communes des Lacs et Montagnes du Haut-Doubs
- Communauté de communes Loue-Lison
- Communauté de communes du Pays de Maîche
- Communauté de communes du Pays de Sancey-Belleherbe
- Communauté de communes du Pays de Villersexel (partly)
- Communauté de communes du pays d'Héricourt (partly)
- Communauté de communes du Plateau de Frasne et du Val de Drugeon
- Communauté de communes du Plateau de Russey
- Communauté de communes des Portes du Haut-Doubs
- Communauté de communes du Val de Morteau
- Communauté de communes du Val Marnaysien (partly)

INSEE code	Postal code	Commune
25001	25320	Abbans-Dessous
25002	25440	Abbans-Dessus
25003	25340	Abbenans
25004	25310	Abbévillers
25005	25250	Accolans
25006	25360	Adam-lès-Passavant
25007	25530	Adam-lès-Vercel
25008	25750	Aibre
25009	25360	Aïssey
25011	25490	Allenjoie
25012	25300	Les Alliés
25013	25550	Allondans
25014	25220	Amagney
25015	25330	Amancey
25016	25330	Amathay-Vésigneux
25017	25330	Amondans
25018	25340	Anteuil
25019	25250	Appenans
25020	25400	Arbouans
25021	25610	Arc-et-Senans
25022	25750	Arcey
25024	25300	Arçon
25025	25520	Arc-sous-Cicon
25026	25270	Arc-sous-Montenot
25029	25520	Aubonne
25030	25170	Audeux
25031	25400	Audincourt
25032	25110	Autechaux
25033	25150	Autechaux-Roide
25035	25870	Les Auxons
25036	25720	Avanne-Aveney
25038	25680	Avilley
25039	25690	Avoudrey
25040	25490	Badevel
25041	25560	Bannans
25042	25210	Le Barboux
25043	25420	Bart
25044	25440	Bartherans
25045	25640	Battenans-les-Mines
25046	25380	Battenans-Varin
25047	25110	Baume-les-Dames
25048	25550	Bavans
25049	25470	Belfays
25050	25500	Le Bélieu
25051	25380	Belleherbe
25052	25530	Belmont
25053	25430	Belvoir
25054	25420	Berche
25055	25410	Berthelange
25056	25000	Besançon
25057	25200	Bethoncourt
25058	25720	Beure
25059	25250	Beutal
25061	25190	Bief
25062	25210	Le Bizot
25063	25310	Blamont
25065	25640	Blarians
25066	25250	Blussangeaux
25067	25250	Blussans
25070	25330	Bolandoz
25071	25230	Bondeval
25072	25680	Bonnal
25073	25870	Bonnay
25074	25210	Bonnétage
25075	25560	Bonnevaux
25077	25210	La Bosse
25078	25360	Bouclans
25079	25560	Boujailles
25082	25150	Bourguignon
25083	25250	Bournois
25084	25320	Boussières
25085	25560	Bouverans
25086	25640	Braillans
25087	25340	Branne
25088	25640	Breconchaux
25089	25530	Bremondans
25090	25440	Brères
25091	25120	Les Bréseux
25092	25640	La Bretenière
25093	25250	Bretigney
25094	25110	Bretigney-Notre-Dame
25095	25380	Bretonvillers
25096	25240	Brey-et-Maison-du-Bois
25097	25600	Brognard
25098	25440	Buffard
25099	25520	Bugny
25100	25560	Bulle
25101	25170	Burgille
25102	25470	Burnevillers
25103	25320	Busy
25104	25440	By
25105	25320	Byans-sur-Doubs
25106	25290	Cademène
25107	25640	Cendrey
25108	25120	Cernay-l'Église
25109	25440	Cessey
25110	25300	Chaffois
25111	25220	Chalèze
25112	25220	Chalezeule
25113	25380	Chamesey
25114	25190	Chamesol
25115	25170	Champagney
25116	25360	Champlive
25117	25640	Champoux
25119	25170	Champvans-les-Moulins
25120	25330	Chantrans
25121	25240	Chapelle-des-Bois
25122	25270	Chapelle-d'Huin
25124	25470	Charmauvillers
25125	25380	Charmoille
25126	25440	Charnay
25127	25140	Charquemont
25129	25290	Chassagne-Saint-Denis
25130	25840	Châteauvieux-les-Fossés
25131	25240	Châtelblanc
25132	25640	Châtillon-Guyotte
25133	25870	Châtillon-le-Duc
25136	25170	Chaucenne
25139	25650	La Chaux
25141	25530	Chaux-lès-Passavant
25142	25240	Chaux-Neuve
25143	25440	Chay
25145	25430	Chazot
25147	25320	Chemaudin et Vaux
25148	25500	La Chenalotte
25149	25440	Chenecey-Buillon
25151	25530	Chevigney-lès-Vercel
25150	25170	Chevigney-sur-l'Ognon
25152	25620	La Chevillotte
25153	25870	Chevroz
25154	25440	Chouzelot
25155	25330	Cléron
25157	25300	La Cluse-et-Mijoux
25159	25260	Colombier-Fontaine
25160	25500	Les Combes
25161	25390	Consolation-Maisonnettes
25163	25640	Corcelle-Mieslot
25162	25410	Corcelles-Ferrières
25164	25410	Corcondray
25166	25360	Côtebrune
25171	25440	Courcelles
25170	25420	Courcelles-lès-Montbéliard
25172	25170	Courchapon
25173	25380	Cour-Saint-Maurice
25174	25470	Courtefontaine
25175	25530	Courtetain-et-Salans
25176	25560	Courvières
25177	25340	Crosey-le-Grand
25178	25340	Crosey-le-Petit
25179	25240	Le Crouzet
25180	25270	Crouzet-Migette
25181	25680	Cubrial
25182	25680	Cubry
25183	25110	Cusance
25184	25680	Cuse-et-Adrisans
25185	25440	Cussey-sur-Lison
25186	25870	Cussey-sur-l'Ognon
25187	25150	Dambelin
25188	25600	Dambenois
25189	25110	Dammartin-les-Templiers
25190	25490	Dampierre-les-Bois
25191	25420	Dampierre-sur-le-Doubs
25192	25190	Dampjoux
25193	25450	Damprichard
25194	25310	Dannemarie
25195	25410	Dannemarie-sur-Crète
25196	25230	Dasle
25197	25960	Deluz
25198	25750	Désandans
25199	25330	Déservillers
25200	25870	Devecey
25201	25300	Dommartin
25202	25560	Dompierre-les-Tilleuls
25203	25510	Domprel
25204	25300	Doubs
25207	25550	Dung
25208	25580	Durnes
25209	25440	Échay
25210	25550	Échenans
25211	25580	Échevannes
25212	25480	École-Valentin
25213	25140	Les Écorces
25214	25150	Écot
25215	25640	L'Écouvotte
25216	25150	Écurcey
25217	25170	Émagny
25218	25530	Épenouse
25219	25800	Épenoy
25220	25290	Épeugney
25221	25110	Esnans
25222	25580	Étalans
25223	25330	Éternoz-Vallée-du-Lison
25224	25260	Étouvans
25225	25170	Étrabonne
25226	25250	Étrappe
25227	25800	Étray
25228	25460	Étupes
25229	25520	Évillers
25230	25400	Exincourt
25231	25530	Eysson
25232	25250	Faimbe
25233	25580	Fallerans
25234	25470	Ferrières-le-Lac
25235	25410	Ferrières-les-Bois
25236	25330	Fertans
25237	25490	Fesches-le-Châtel
25238	25470	Fessevillers
25239	25190	Feule
25240	25500	Les Fins
25241	25330	Flagey
25242	25640	Flagey-Rigney
25243	25390	Flangebouche
25244	25190	Fleurey
25245	25660	Fontain
25246	25340	Fontaine-lès-Clerval
25247	25340	Fontenelle-Montby
25248	25210	Les Fontenelles
25249	25110	Fontenotte
25251	25110	Fourbanne
25252	25370	Fourcatier-et-Maison-Neuve
25253	25440	Fourg
25254	25300	Les Fourgs
25255	25140	Fournet-Blancheroche
25288	25390	Fournets-Luisans
25256	25140	Frambouhans
25257	25170	Franey
25258	25770	Franois
25259	25560	Frasne
25261	25190	Froidevaux
25262	25390	Fuans
25263	25240	Gellin
25264	25250	Gémonval
25265	25870	Geneuille
25266	25250	Geney
25267	25660	Gennes
25268	25510	Germéfontaine
25269	25640	Germondans
25270	25270	Gevresin
25271	25650	Gilley
25273	25360	Glamondans
25274	25310	Glay
25275	25190	Glère
25277	25680	Gondenans-les-Moulins
25276	25340	Gondenans-Montby
25278	25360	Gonsans
25279	25680	Gouhelans
25280	25470	Goumois
25281	25150	Goux-lès-Dambelin
25283	25440	Goux-sous-Landet
25284	25200	Grand-Charmont
25285	25570	Grand'Combe-Châteleu
25286	25210	Grand'Combe-des-Bois
25287	25320	Grandfontaine
25289	25510	Grandfontaine-sur-Creuse
25290	25380	La Grange
25293	25300	Granges-Narboz
25295	25160	Les Grangettes
25296	25790	Les Gras
25298	25110	Grosbois
25299	25110	Guillon-les-Bains
25300	25580	Guyans-Durnes
25301	25390	Guyans-Vennes
25304	25310	Hérimoncourt
25305	25620	L'Hôpital-du-Grosbois
25306	25340	L'Hôpital-Saint-Lieffroy
25307	25370	Les Hôpitaux-Neufs
25308	25370	Les Hôpitaux-Vieux
25309	25300	Houtaud
25310	25680	Huanne-Montmartin
25311	25250	Hyémondans
25312	25110	Hyèvre-Magny
25313	25110	Hyèvre-Paroisse
25314	25470	Indevillers
25315	25250	L'Isle-sur-le-Doubs
25316	25550	Issans
25317	25170	Jallerange
25318	25370	Jougne
25320	25160	Labergement-Sainte-Marie
25322	25550	Laire
25323	25820	Laissey

INSEE code	Postal code	Commune
25324	25360	Lanans
25325	25530	Landresse
25326	25170	Lantenne-Vertière
25327	25250	Lanthenans
25328	25720	Larnod
25329	25210	Laval-le-Prieuré
25330	25440	Lavans-Quingey
25331	25580	Lavans-Vuillafans
25332	25170	Lavernay
25333	25510	Laviron
25334	25270	Levier
25335	25190	Liebvillers
25336	25440	Liesle
25338	25330	Lizine
25339	25930	Lods
25340	25440	Lombard
25341	25110	Lomont-sur-Crête
25342	25690	Longechaux
25343	25690	Longemaison
25344	25380	Longevelle-lès-Russey
25345	25260	Longevelle-sur-Doubs
25346	25330	Longeville
25348	25370	Longevilles-Mont-d'Or
25349	25390	Loray
25350	25260	Lougres
25351	25210	Le Luhier
25354	25110	Luxiol
25355	25360	Magny-Châtelard
25356	25120	Maîche
25357	25650	Maisons-du-Bois-Lièvremont
25359	25330	Malans
25360	25620	Malbrans
25361	25160	Malbuisson
25362	25160	Malpas
25364	25620	Mamirolle
25365	25250	Mancenans
25366	25120	Mancenans-Lizerne
25367	25350	Mandeure
25368	25640	Marchaux-Chaudefontaine
25369	25250	Marvelise
25370	25700	Mathay
25371	25170	Mazerolles-le-Salin
25372	25250	Médière
25373	25210	Le Mémont
25374	25410	Mercey-le-Grand
25376	25870	Mérey-Vieilley
25377	25680	Mésandans
25378	25310	Meslières
25379	25440	Mesmay
25380	25370	Métabief
25381	25480	Miserey-Salines
25382	25870	Moncey
25383	25170	Moncley
25384	25680	Mondon
25385	25680	Montagney-Servigney
25386	25190	Montancy
25387	25190	Montandon
25388	25200	Montbéliard
25389	25210	Montbéliardot
25391	25210	Mont-de-Laval
25392	25120	Mont-de-Vougney
25393	25190	Montécheroux
25394	25260	Montenois
25395	25660	Montfaucon
25397	25320	Montferrand-le-Château
25400	25111	Montgesoye
25401	25110	Montivernage
25402	25190	Montjoie-le-Château
25403	25500	Montlebon
25404	25270	Montmahoux
25405	25160	Montperreux
25406	25660	Montrond-le-Château
25375	25620, 25660	Les Monts-Ronds
25408	25680	Montussaint
25410	25660	Morre
25411	25500	Morteau
25413	25240	Mouthe
25414	25170	Le Moutherot
25415	25920	Mouthier-Haute-Pierre
25416	25440	Myon
25417	25360	Naisey-les-Granges
25418	25360	Nancray
25419	25680	Nans
25420	25330	Nans-sous-Sainte-Anne
25421	25210	Narbief
25422	25150	Neuchâtel-Urtière
25425	25500	Noël-Cerneux
25426	25190	Noirefontaine
25427	25170	Noironte
25428	25600	Nommay
25429	25220	Novillars
25430	25640	Ollans
25431	25250	Onans
25432	25390	Orchamps-Vennes
25433	25120	Orgeans-Blanchefontaine
25434	25290	Ornans
25435	25530	Orsans
25436	25430	Orve
25437	25360	Osse
25438	25320	Osselle-Routelle
25439	25640	Ougney-Douvot
25440	25520	Ouhans
25441	25530	Ouvans
25442	25160	Oye-et-Pallet
25443	25440	Palantine
25444	25870	Palise
25445	25440	Paroy
25446	25360	Passavant
25447	25690	Passonfontaine
25156	25340	Pays-de-Clerval
25390	25650	Pays-de-Montbenoît
25448	25170	Pelousey
25449	25190	Péseux
25450	25440	Pessans
25451	25240	Petite-Chaux
25452	25310	Pierrefontaine-lès-Blamont
25453	25510	Pierrefontaine-les-Varans
25454	25480	Pirey
25455	25170	Placey
25456	25210	Plaimbois-du-Miroir
25457	25390	Plaimbois-Vennes
25458	25470	Les Plains-et-Grands-Essarts
25459	25160	La Planée
25461	25340	Pompierre-sur-Doubs
25462	25300	Pontarlier
25463	25150	Pont-de-Roide-Vermondans
25464	25240	Les Pontets
25465	25110	Pont-les-Moulins
25466	25410	Pouilley-Français
25467	25115	Pouilley-les-Vignes
25468	25640	Pouligney-Lusans
25424	25580	Les Premiers-Sapins
25469	25550	Présentevillers
25470	25250	La Prétière
25471	25380	Provenchère
25472	25680	Puessans
25473	25720	Pugey
25474	25640	Le Puy
25475	25440	Quingey
25476	25430	Rahon
25477	25320	Rancenay
25478	25430	Randevillers
25479	25250	Rang
25481	25550	Raynans
25482	25170	Recologne
25483	25240	Reculfoz
25485	25150	Rémondans-Vaivre
25486	25160	Remoray-Boujeons
25487	25520	Renédale
25488	25440	Rennes-sur-Loue
25489	25330	Reugney
25490	25640	Rigney
25491	25640	Rignosot
25492	25110	Rillans
25493	25560	La Rivière-Drugeon
25494	25370	Rochejean
25496	25340	Roche-lès-Clerval
25495	25220	Roche-lez-Beaupré
25497	25310	Roches-lès-Blamont
25498	25680	Rognon
25499	25680	Romain
25500	25440	Ronchaux
25501	25240	Rondefontaine
25502	25410	Roset-Fluans
25503	25190	Rosières-sur-Barbèche
25504	25380	Rosureux
25505	25680	Rougemont
25506	25640	Rougemontot
25507	25440	Rouhe
25508	25640	Roulans
25510	25170	Ruffey-le-Château
25511	25290	Rurey
25512	25210	Le Russey
25514	25370	Saint-Antoine
25516	25340	Saint-Georges-Armont
25517	25520	Saint-Gorgon-Main
25518	25640	Saint-Hilaire
25519	25190	Saint-Hippolyte
25520	25360	Saint-Juan
25521	25550	Saint-Julien-lès-Montbéliard
25522	25210	Saint-Julien-lès-Russey
25524	25260	Saint-Maurice-Colombier
25525	25160	Saint-Point-Lac
25527	25410	Saint-Vit
25513	25270	Sainte-Anne
25515	25300	Sainte-Colombe
25523	25113	Sainte-Marie
25526	25630	Sainte-Suzanne
25528	25440	Samson
25529	25430	Sancey
25532	25660	Saône
25534	25240	Sarrageois
25535	25580	Saules
25536	25170	Sauvagney
25537	25290	Scey-Maisières
25538	25110	Séchin
25539	25230	Seloncourt
25540	25750	Semondans
25541	25270	Septfontaines
25542	25770	Serre-les-Sapins
25544	25430	Servin
25545	25330	Silley-Amancey
25546	25110	Silley-Bléfond
25547	25600	Sochaux
25548	25190	Solemont
25550	25510	La Sommette
25551	25190	Soulce-Cernay
25552	25250	Sourans
25553	25250	Soye
25554	25380	Surmont
25555	25400	Taillecourt
25556	25680	Tallans
25557	25870	Tallenay
25558	25620	Tarcenay-Foucherans
25138	25190	Les Terres-de-Chaux
25559	25470	Thiébouhans
25560	25220	Thise
25561	25320	Thoraise
25562	25310	Thulay
25563	25870	Thurey-le-Mont
25564	25320	Torpes
25565	25370	Touillon-et-Loutelet
25566	25640	La Tour-de-Sçay
25567	25680	Tournans
25569	25620	Trépot
25570	25680	Tressandans
25571	25470	Trévillers
25572	25680	Trouvans
25573	25470	Urtière
25574	25340	Uzelle
25575	25220	Vaire
25460	25440	Le Val
25578	25800	Valdahon
25579	25640	Val-de-Roulans
25060	25520	Val-d'Usiers
25580	25700	Valentigney
25582	25870	Valleroy
25583	25190	Valonne
25584	25190	Valoreille
25586	25230	Vandoncourt
25588	25380	Vaucluse
25589	25380	Vauclusotte
25590	25360	Vaudrivillers
25591	25190	Vaufrey
25592	25160	Vaux-et-Chantegrue
25594	25410	Velesmes-Essarts
25595	25430	Vellerot-lès-Belvoir
25596	25530	Vellerot-lès-Vercel
25597	25430	Vellevans
25598	25870	Venise
25599	25640	Vennans
25600	25390	Vennes
25601	25530	Vercel-Villedieu-le-Camp
25602	25110	Vergranne
25604	25110	Verne
25605	25580	Vernierfontaine
25607	25430	Vernois-lès-Belvoir
25608	25750	Le Vernoy
25609	25300	Verrières-de-Joux
25611	25660	La Vèze
25612	25870	Vieilley
25613	25340	Viéthorey
25614	25600	Vieux-Charmont
25615	25310	Villars-lès-Blamont
25616	25410	Villars-Saint-Georges
25617	25190	Villars-sous-Dampjoux
25618	25150	Villars-sous-Écot
25619	25240	Les Villedieu
25621	25270	Villeneuve-d'Amont
25622	25170	Villers-Buzon
25623	25530	Villers-Chief
25624	25640	Villers-Grélot
25625	25510	Villers-la-Combe
25321	25130	Villers-le-Lac
25626	25110	Villers-Saint-Martin
25627	25270	Villers-sous-Chalamont
25629	25110	Voillans
25630	25580	Voires
25631	25320	Vorges-les-Pins
25632	25420	Voujeaucourt
25633	25840	Vuillafans
25634	25300	Vuillecin
25635	25430	Vyt-lès-Belvoir
