= Flagey-Rigney =

- Commune
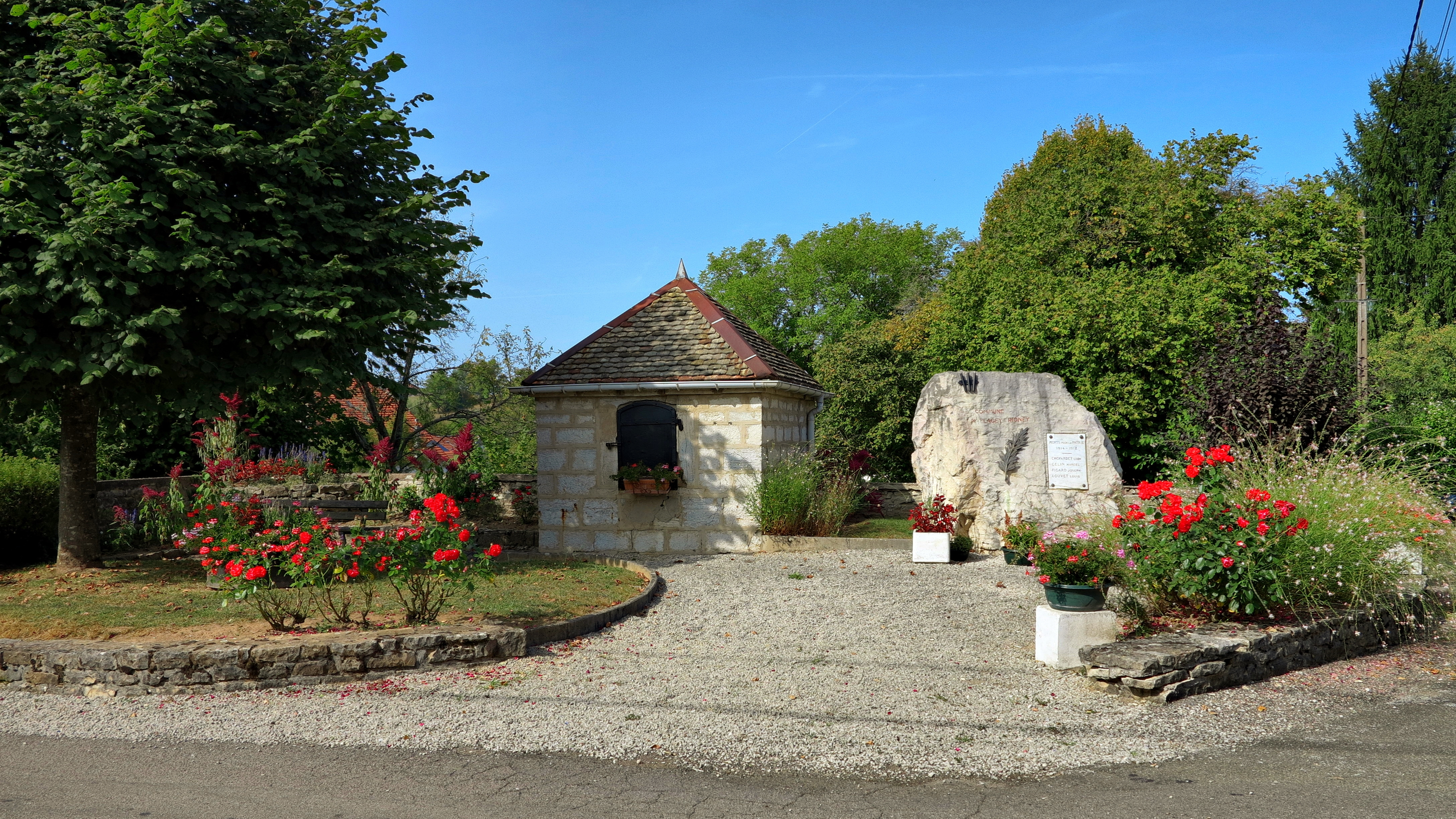
- The fountain in Flagey-Rigney

- Coat of arms
- Location of Flagey-Rigney
- Location within France Location within Bourgogne-Franche-Comté
- Coordinates: 47°25′11″N 6°13′27″E
- Country: France
- Region: Bourgogne-Franche-Comté
- Department: Doubs
- Arrondissement: Besançon
- Canton: Baume-les-Dames
- Intercommunality: Doubs Baumois

Government
  - Mayor (2020–2026): Christian Pagnier
- Area^{1}: 3.03 km^{2} (1.17 sq mi)
- Highest elevation: 282 m (925 ft)
- Lowest elevation: 232 m (761 ft)
- Population (2023): 137
  - Density: 45.2/km^{2} (117/sq mi)
- Time zone: UTC+01:00 (CET)
  - Summer (DST): UTC+02:00 (CEST)
- INSEE/Postal code: 25242 /25640
- ^{1} French Land Register data, which excludes lakes, ponds, glaciers > 1 km^{2} (0.386 sq mi or 247 acres) and river estuaries.

Flagey-Rigney (French pronunciation: [flaʒɛ ʁiɲɛ]) is a commune in the Doubs department in the Bourgogne-Franche-Comté region in eastern France.

== Population ==
Historical population
Year	Pop.	±% p.a.
1968	53	—
1975	73	+4.68%
1982	75	+0.39%
1990	75	+0.00%
1999	71	−0.61%
2007	73	+0.35%
2012	92	+4.74%
2017	112	+4.01%
2023	137	+3.42%
Source: INSEE

== See also ==
- Communes of the Doubs department
