= Sainte-Anne, Doubs =

Sainte-Anne
- Commune
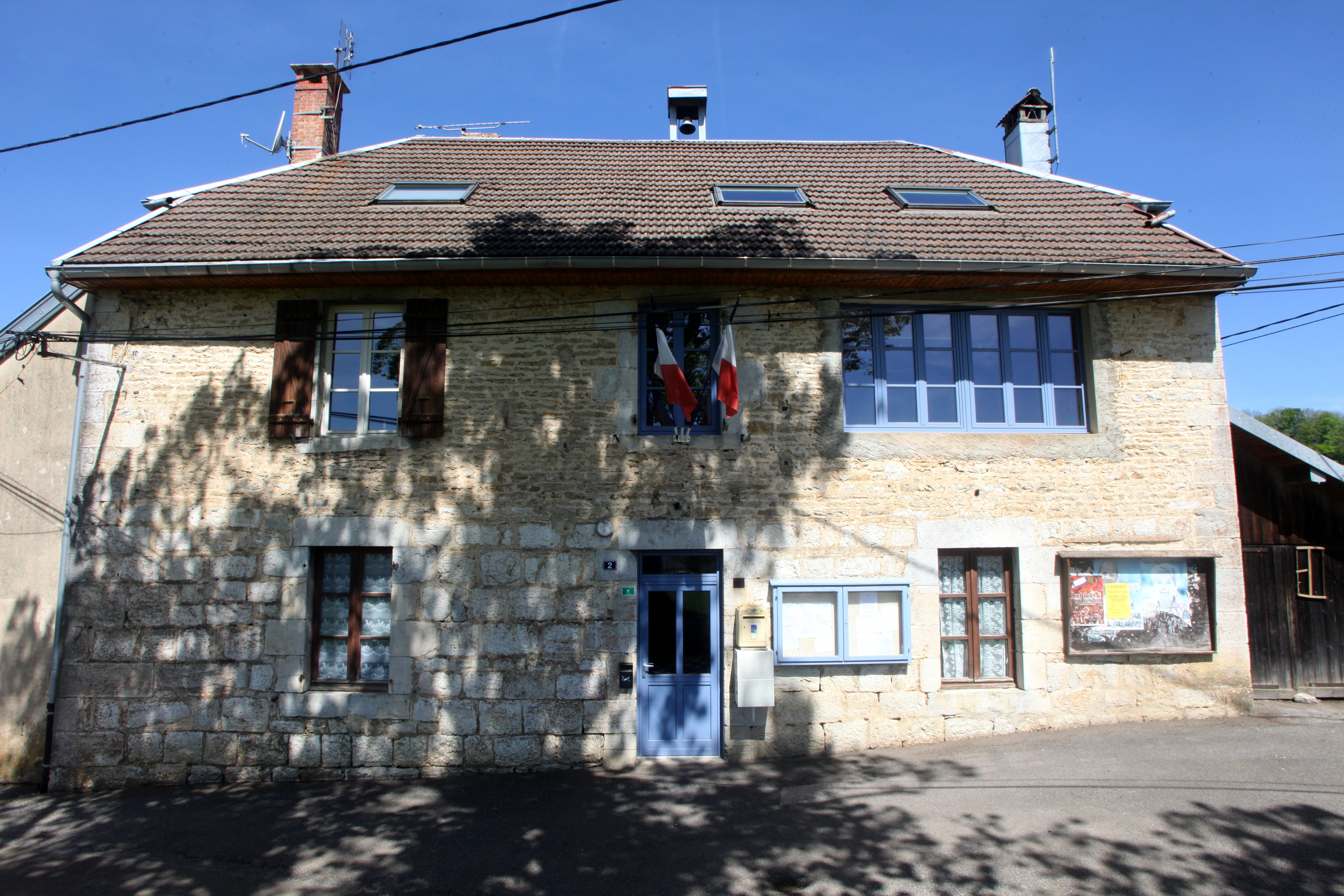
- The town hall in Sainte-Anne
- Location of Sainte-Anne
- Location within France Location within Bourgogne-Franche-Comté
- Coordinates: 46°57′18″N 5°59′10″E
- Country: France
- Region: Bourgogne-Franche-Comté
- Department: Doubs
- Arrondissement: Besançon
- Canton: Ornans
- Intercommunality: Loue-Lison

Government
  - Mayor (2020–2026): Joël Bôle
- Area^{1}: 6.64 km^{2} (2.56 sq mi)
- Highest elevation: 741 m (2,431 ft)
- Lowest elevation: 490 m (1,610 ft)
- Population (2023): 50
  - Density: 7.5/km^{2} (20/sq mi)
- Time zone: UTC+01:00 (CET)
  - Summer (DST): UTC+02:00 (CEST)
- INSEE/Postal code: 25513 /25270
- ^{1} French Land Register data, which excludes lakes, ponds, glaciers > 1 km^{2} (0.386 sq mi or 247 acres) and river estuaries.

Sainte-Anne (French pronunciation: [sɛ̃t an]) is a commune in the Doubs department in the Bourgogne-Franche-Comté region in eastern France.

== Geography ==
The commune lies 30 km (19 mi) west of Pontarlier.

== Population ==
Historical population
Year	Pop.	±% p.a.
1968	65	—
1975	51	−3.41%
1982	36	−4.85%
1990	37	+0.34%
1999	29	−2.67%
2007	30	+0.42%
2012	33	+1.92%
2017	42	+4.94%
2023	50	+2.95%
Source: INSEE

== See also ==
- Communes of the Doubs department
