= Le Moutherot =

- Commune
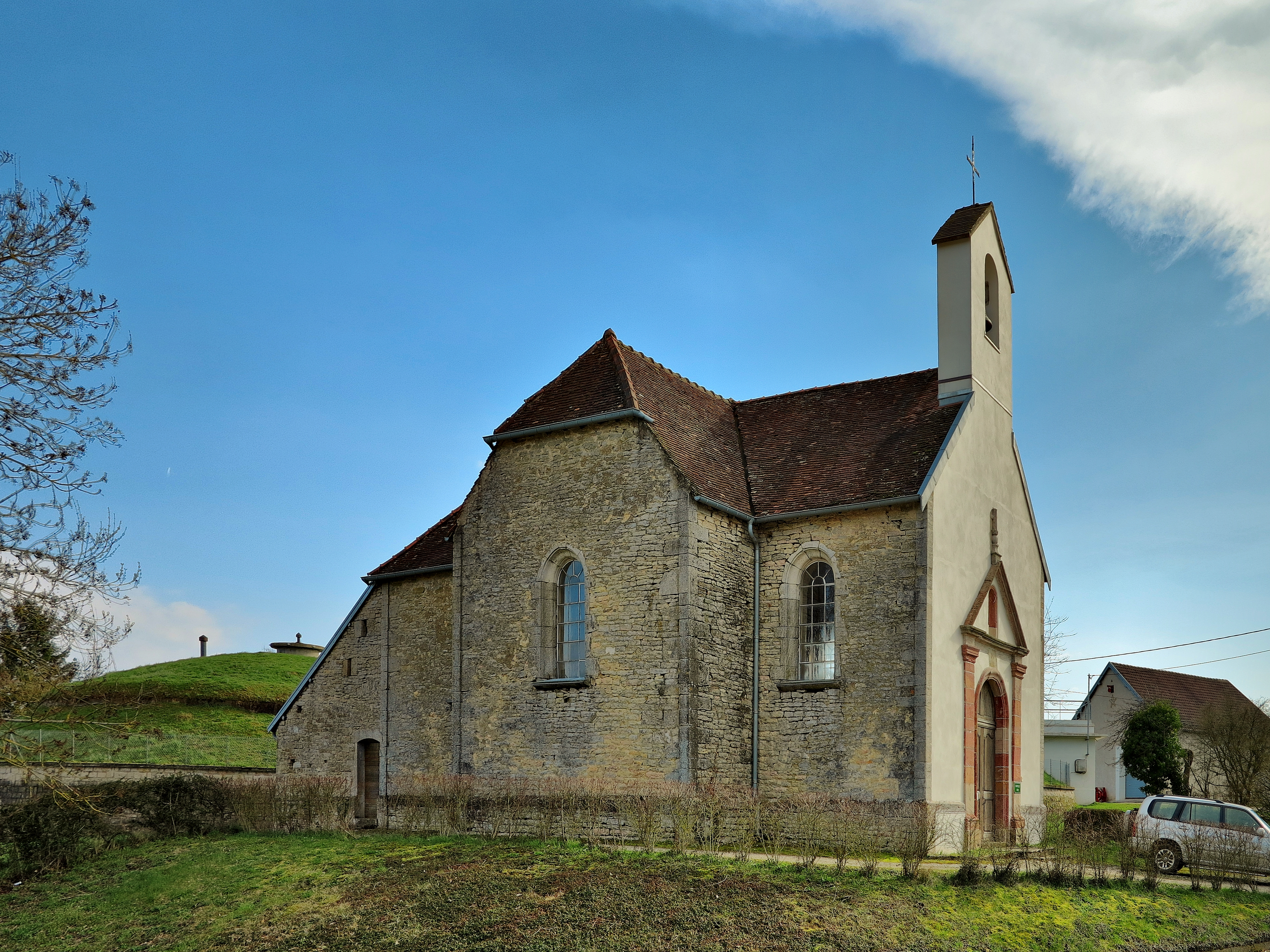
- The chapel in Le Moutherot

- Coat of arms
- Location of Le Moutherot
- Location within France Location within Bourgogne-Franche-Comté
- Coordinates: 47°14′38″N 5°43′59″E
- Country: France
- Region: Bourgogne-Franche-Comté
- Department: Doubs
- Arrondissement: Besançon
- Canton: Saint-Vit

Government
  - Mayor (2020–2026): Alain Theurel
- Area^{1}: 1.3 km^{2} (0.50 sq mi)
- Highest elevation: 324 m (1,063 ft)
- Lowest elevation: 239 m (784 ft)
- Population (2023): 132
  - Density: 100/km^{2} (260/sq mi)
- Time zone: UTC+01:00 (CET)
  - Summer (DST): UTC+02:00 (CEST)
- INSEE/Postal code: 25414 /25170
- ^{1} French Land Register data, which excludes lakes, ponds, glaciers > 1 km^{2} (0.386 sq mi or 247 acres) and river estuaries.

Le Moutherot (French pronunciation: [lə mutʁo]) is a commune in the Doubs department in the Bourgogne-Franche-Comté region in eastern France.

== Geography ==
The commune lies 25 km (16 mi) from Besançon, Dole, and Gray between the rivers Ognon and Doubs.

On a top of a hill, the village offers a view on fields, forests. In bright weather Mont Blanc, the Mount Poupet, and the "Ballon of Alsace" can be seen.

== Population ==
Historical population
Year	Pop.	±% p.a.
1968	23	—
1975	30	+3.87%
1982	37	+3.04%
1990	61	+6.45%
1999	78	+2.77%
2007	99	+3.02%
2012	131	+5.76%
2017	127	−0.62%
2023	132	+0.65%
Source: INSEE

== See also ==
- Communes of the Doubs department
