= Cubry =

- Commune
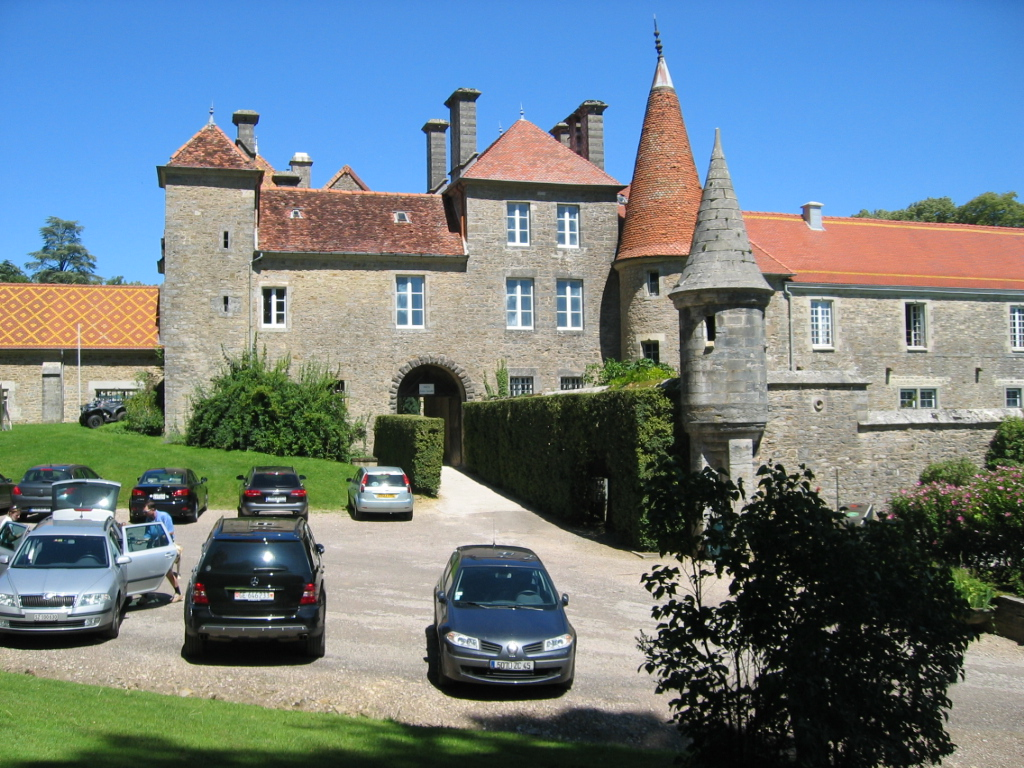
- Chateau of Bournel
- Location of Cubry
- Location within France Location within Bourgogne-Franche-Comté
- Coordinates: 47°29′38″N 6°25′24″E
- Country: France
- Region: Bourgogne-Franche-Comté
- Department: Doubs
- Arrondissement: Besançon
- Canton: Baume-les-Dames

Government
  - Mayor (2020–2026): Nicolas Gruneisen
- Area^{1}: 5.4 km^{2} (2.1 sq mi)
- Highest elevation: 453 m (1,486 ft)
- Lowest elevation: 266 m (873 ft)
- Population (2023): 104
  - Density: 19/km^{2} (50/sq mi)
- Time zone: UTC+01:00 (CET)
  - Summer (DST): UTC+02:00 (CEST)
- INSEE/Postal code: 25182 /25680
- ^{1} French Land Register data, which excludes lakes, ponds, glaciers > 1 km^{2} (0.386 sq mi or 247 acres) and river estuaries.

Cubry (French pronunciation: [kybʁi]) is a commune in the Doubs department in the Bourgogne-Franche-Comté region in eastern France.

== Population ==
Historical population
Year	Pop.	±% p.a.
1968	96	—
1975	82	−2.23%
1982	106	+3.74%
1990	105	−0.12%
1999	70	−4.41%
2007	75	+0.87%
2012	81	+1.55%
2017	88	+1.67%
2023	104	+2.82%
Source: INSEE

== See also ==
- Communes of the Doubs department
