= Saint-Juan =

- Commune
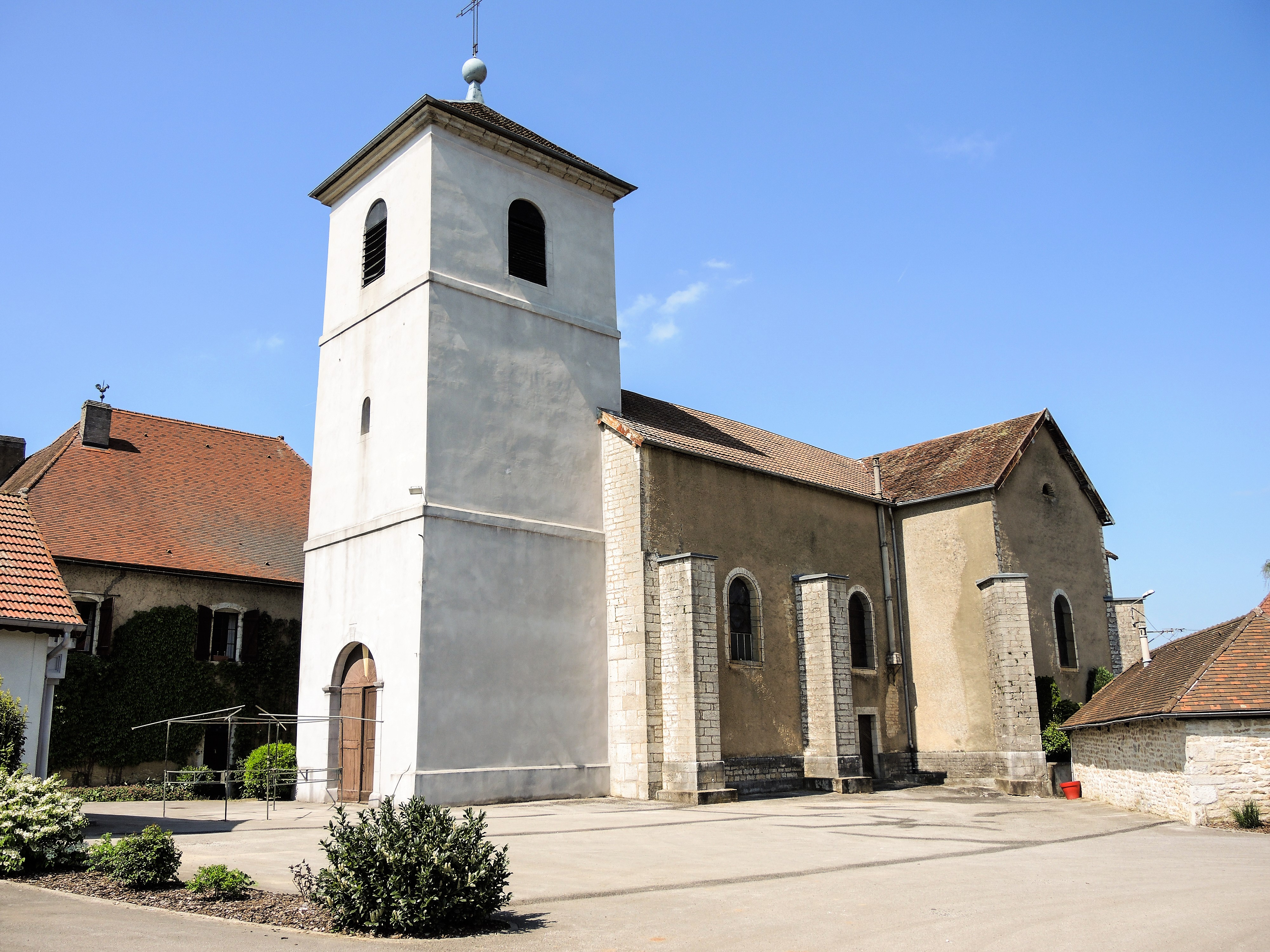
- The church in Saint-Juan
- Location of Saint-Juan
- Location within France Location within Bourgogne-Franche-Comté
- Coordinates: 47°17′23″N 6°21′25″E
- Country: France
- Region: Bourgogne-Franche-Comté
- Department: Doubs
- Arrondissement: Besançon
- Canton: Baume-les-Dames

Government
  - Mayor (2020–2026): Jérôme Faivre
- Area^{1}: 12.09 km^{2} (4.67 sq mi)
- Highest elevation: 607 m (1,991 ft)
- Lowest elevation: 348 m (1,142 ft)
- Population (2023): 191
  - Density: 15.8/km^{2} (40.9/sq mi)
- Time zone: UTC+01:00 (CET)
  - Summer (DST): UTC+02:00 (CEST)
- INSEE/Postal code: 25520 /25360
- ^{1} French Land Register data, which excludes lakes, ponds, glaciers > 1 km^{2} (0.386 sq mi or 247 acres) and river estuaries.

Saint-Juan (French pronunciation: [sɛ̃ ʒɥɑ̃]) is a commune in the Doubs department in the Bourgogne-Franche-Comté region in eastern France.

== Geography ==
The commune lies 12 km (7.5 mi) south of Baume-les-Dames.

== Population ==
Historical population
| Year | Pop. | ±% p.a. |
|---|---|---|
| 1968 | 185 | — |
| 1975 | 186 | +0.08% |
| 1982 | 195 | +0.68% |
| 1990 | 162 | −2.29% |
| 1999 | 160 | −0.14% |
| 2007 | 192 | +2.31% |
| 2012 | 176 | −1.73% |
| 2017 | 172 | −0.46% |
| 2023 | 191 | +1.76% |
Source: INSEE

== See also ==
- Communes of the Doubs department
