= Rennes-sur-Loue =

- Commune
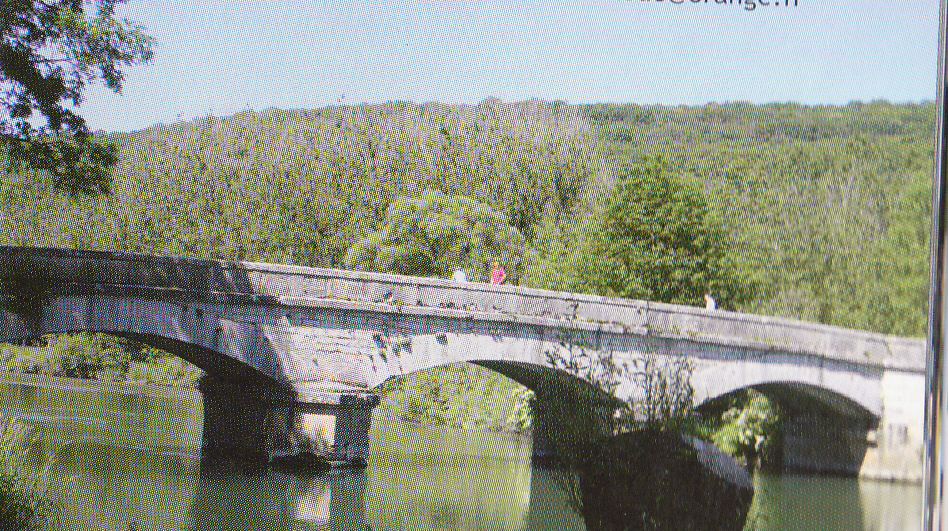
- Bridge over the Loue
- Location of Rennes-sur-Loue
- Location within France Location within Bourgogne-Franche-Comté
- Coordinates: 47°00′46″N 5°51′13″E
- Country: France
- Region: Bourgogne-Franche-Comté
- Department: Doubs
- Arrondissement: Besançon
- Canton: Saint-Vit
- Intercommunality: Loue-Lison

Government
  - Mayor (2020–2026): Thierry Maire-du-Poset
- Area^{1}: 5.5 km^{2} (2.1 sq mi)
- Highest elevation: 495 m (1,624 ft)
- Lowest elevation: 245 m (804 ft)
- Population (2023): 108
  - Density: 20/km^{2} (51/sq mi)
- Time zone: UTC+01:00 (CET)
  - Summer (DST): UTC+02:00 (CEST)
- INSEE/Postal code: 25488 /25440
- ^{1} French Land Register data, which excludes lakes, ponds, glaciers > 1 km^{2} (0.386 sq mi or 247 acres) and river estuaries.

Rennes-sur-Loue (French pronunciation: [ʁɛn syʁ lu], literally Rennes on Loue) is a commune in the Doubs department in the Bourgogne-Franche-Comté region in eastern France.

== Population ==
Historical population
Year	Pop.	±% p.a.
1968	81	—
1975	99	+2.91%
1982	75	−3.89%
1990	94	+2.86%
1999	90	−0.48%
2007	94	+0.55%
2012	88	−1.31%
2017	104	+3.40%
2023	108	+0.63%
Source: INSEE

== See also ==
- Communes of the Doubs department
