= Tournans =

- Commune
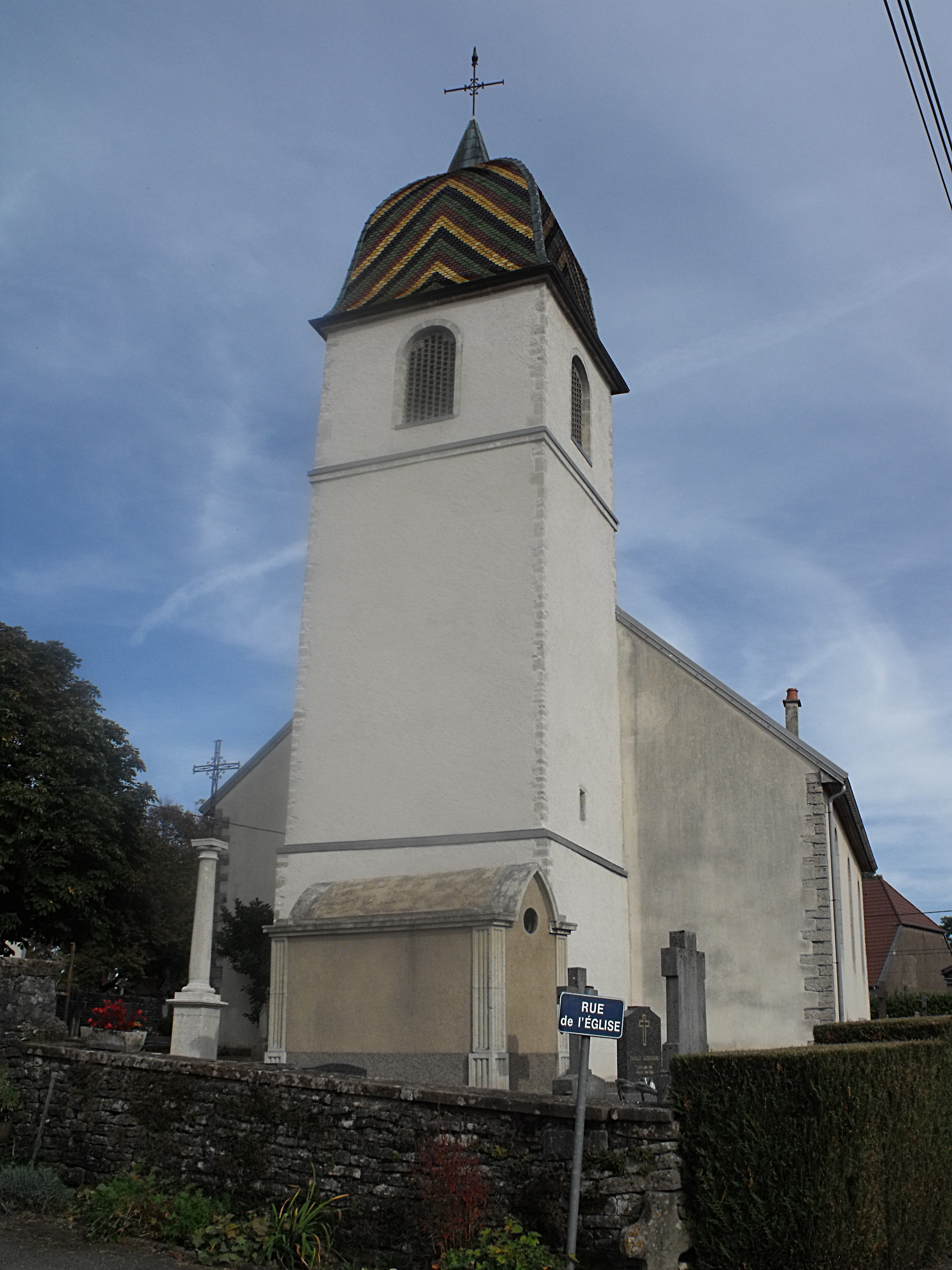
- The church in Tournans
- Location of Tournans
- Location within France Location within Bourgogne-Franche-Comté
- Coordinates: 47°24′51″N 6°19′41″E
- Country: France
- Region: Bourgogne-Franche-Comté
- Department: Doubs
- Arrondissement: Besançon
- Canton: Baume-les-Dames

Government
  - Mayor (2020–2026): Thierry Chierici
- Area^{1}: 9.14 km^{2} (3.53 sq mi)
- Highest elevation: 457 m (1,499 ft)
- Lowest elevation: 305 m (1,001 ft)
- Population (2023): 112
  - Density: 12.3/km^{2} (31.7/sq mi)
- Time zone: UTC+01:00 (CET)
  - Summer (DST): UTC+02:00 (CEST)
- INSEE/Postal code: 25567 /25680
- ^{1} French Land Register data, which excludes lakes, ponds, glaciers > 1 km^{2} (0.386 sq mi or 247 acres) and river estuaries.

Tournans (French pronunciation: [tuʁnɑ̃]) is a commune in the Doubs department in the Bourgogne-Franche-Comté region in eastern France.

== Geography ==
Tournans lies 11 km (6.8 mi) south of Rougemont.

== Population ==
Historical population
Year	Pop.	±% p.a.
1968	112	—
1975	82	−4.36%
1982	83	+0.17%
1990	87	+0.59%
1999	119	+3.54%
2007	114	−0.54%
2012	125	+1.86%
2017	127	+0.32%
2023	112	−2.07%
Source: INSEE

== See also ==
- Communes of the Doubs department
