= Courcelles, Doubs =

Courcelles
- Commune
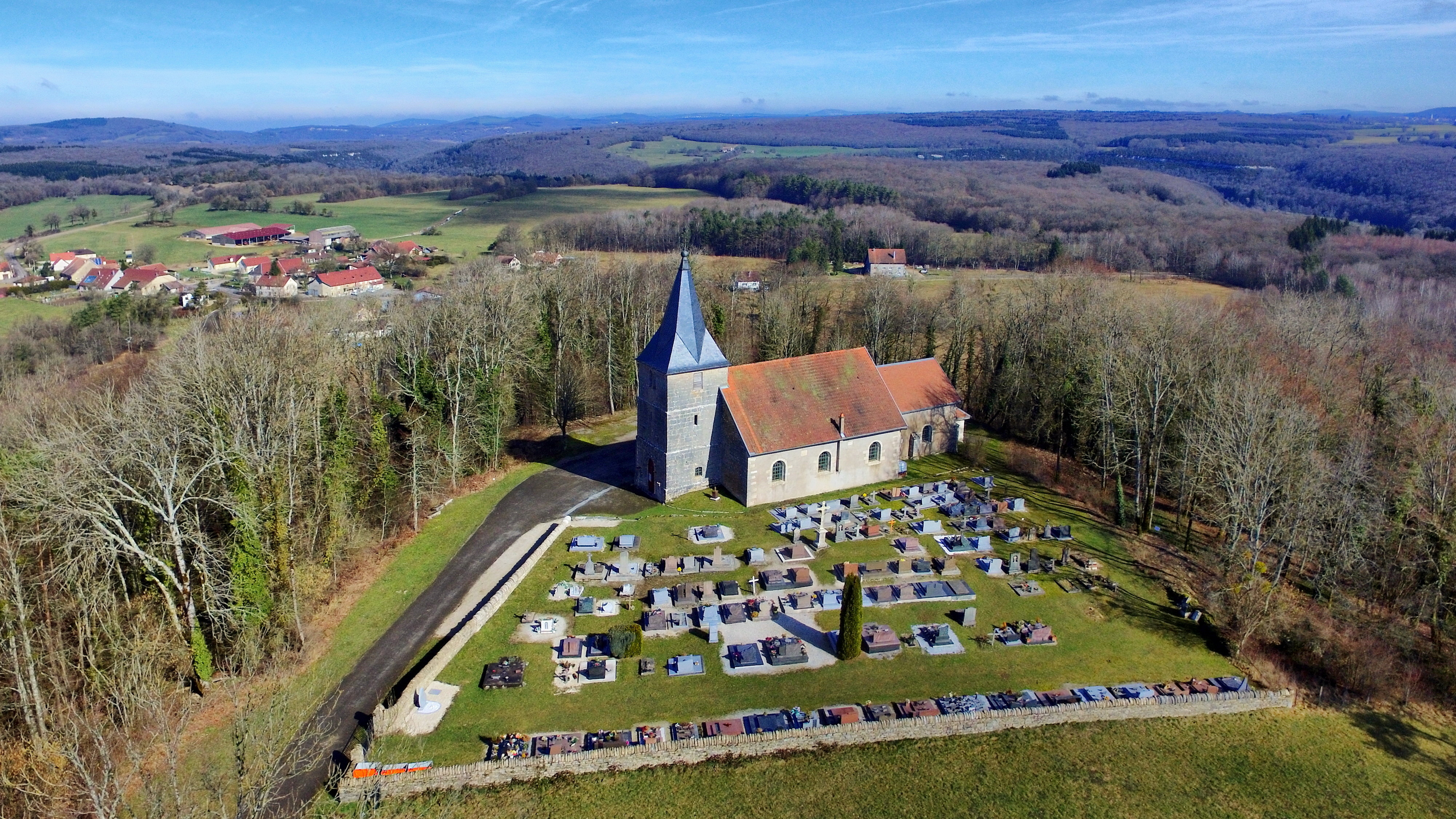
- The church in Courcelles

- Coat of arms
- Location of Courcelles
- Location within France Location within Bourgogne-Franche-Comté
- Coordinates: 47°05′41″N 5°57′28″E
- Country: France
- Region: Bourgogne-Franche-Comté
- Department: Doubs
- Arrondissement: Besançon
- Canton: Saint-Vit
- Intercommunality: Loue-Lison

Government
  - Mayor (2020–2026): Jean-Marc Cargnino
- Area^{1}: 3.61 km^{2} (1.39 sq mi)
- Highest elevation: 416 m (1,365 ft)
- Lowest elevation: 280 m (920 ft)
- Population (2023): 102
  - Density: 28.3/km^{2} (73.2/sq mi)
- Time zone: UTC+01:00 (CET)
  - Summer (DST): UTC+02:00 (CEST)
- INSEE/Postal code: 25171 /25440
- ^{1} French Land Register data, which excludes lakes, ponds, glaciers > 1 km^{2} (0.386 sq mi or 247 acres) and river estuaries.

Courcelles (French pronunciation: [kuʁsɛl]) is a commune in the Doubs department in the Bourgogne-Franche-Comté region in eastern France.

== Population ==
Historical population
Year	Pop.	±% p.a.
1968	51	—
1975	58	+1.85%
1982	65	+1.64%
1990	63	−0.39%
1999	63	+0.00%
2007	74	+2.03%
2012	91	+4.22%
2017	106	+3.10%
2023	102	−0.64%
Source: INSEE

== See also ==
- Communes of the Doubs department
