= Longeville =

- Commune
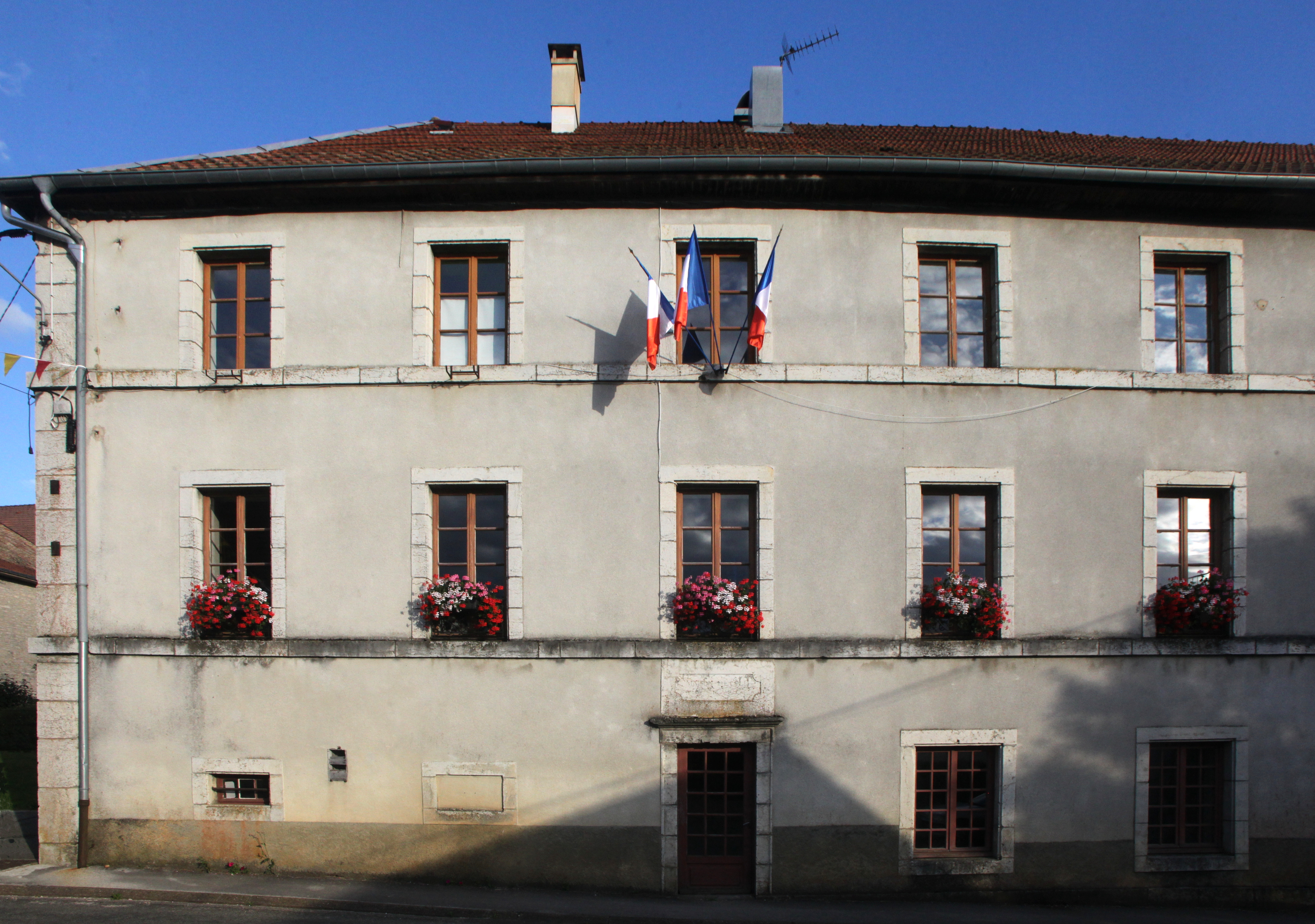
- The town hall in Longeville
- Location of Longeville
- Location within France Location within Bourgogne-Franche-Comté
- Coordinates: 47°01′55″N 6°13′42″E
- Country: France
- Region: Bourgogne-Franche-Comté
- Department: Doubs
- Arrondissement: Besançon
- Canton: Ornans
- Intercommunality: Loue-Lison

Government
  - Mayor (2020–2026): Pierre-André Vouillot
- Area^{1}: 9.46 km^{2} (3.65 sq mi)
- Highest elevation: 930 m (3,050 ft)
- Lowest elevation: 540 m (1,770 ft)
- Population (2023): 174
  - Density: 18.4/km^{2} (47.6/sq mi)
- Time zone: UTC+01:00 (CET)
  - Summer (DST): UTC+02:00 (CEST)
- INSEE/Postal code: 25346 /25330
- ^{1} French Land Register data, which excludes lakes, ponds, glaciers > 1 km^{2} (0.386 sq mi or 247 acres) and river estuaries.

Longeville (French pronunciation: [lɔ̃ʒvil]) is a commune in the Doubs department in the Bourgogne-Franche-Comté region in eastern France.

== Geography ==
Longeville is a long, narrow village, as its name implies. It is the highest commune in the canton.

The cliffs of the Capucin and Mont Belvoir at 850 m dominate the valley of the Loue River.

== Population ==
Historical population
Year	Pop.	±% p.a.
1968	195	—
1975	163	−2.53%
1982	141	−2.05%
1990	145	+0.35%
1999	134	−0.87%
2007	144	+0.90%
2012	158	+1.87%
2017	173	+1.83%
2023	174	+0.10%
Source: INSEE

== Economy ==
Cheese production is an important industry, particularly Comté, a hard cheese made of cow's milk similar to Gruyère.

== See also ==
- Communes of the Doubs department
