= Roulans =

- Commune
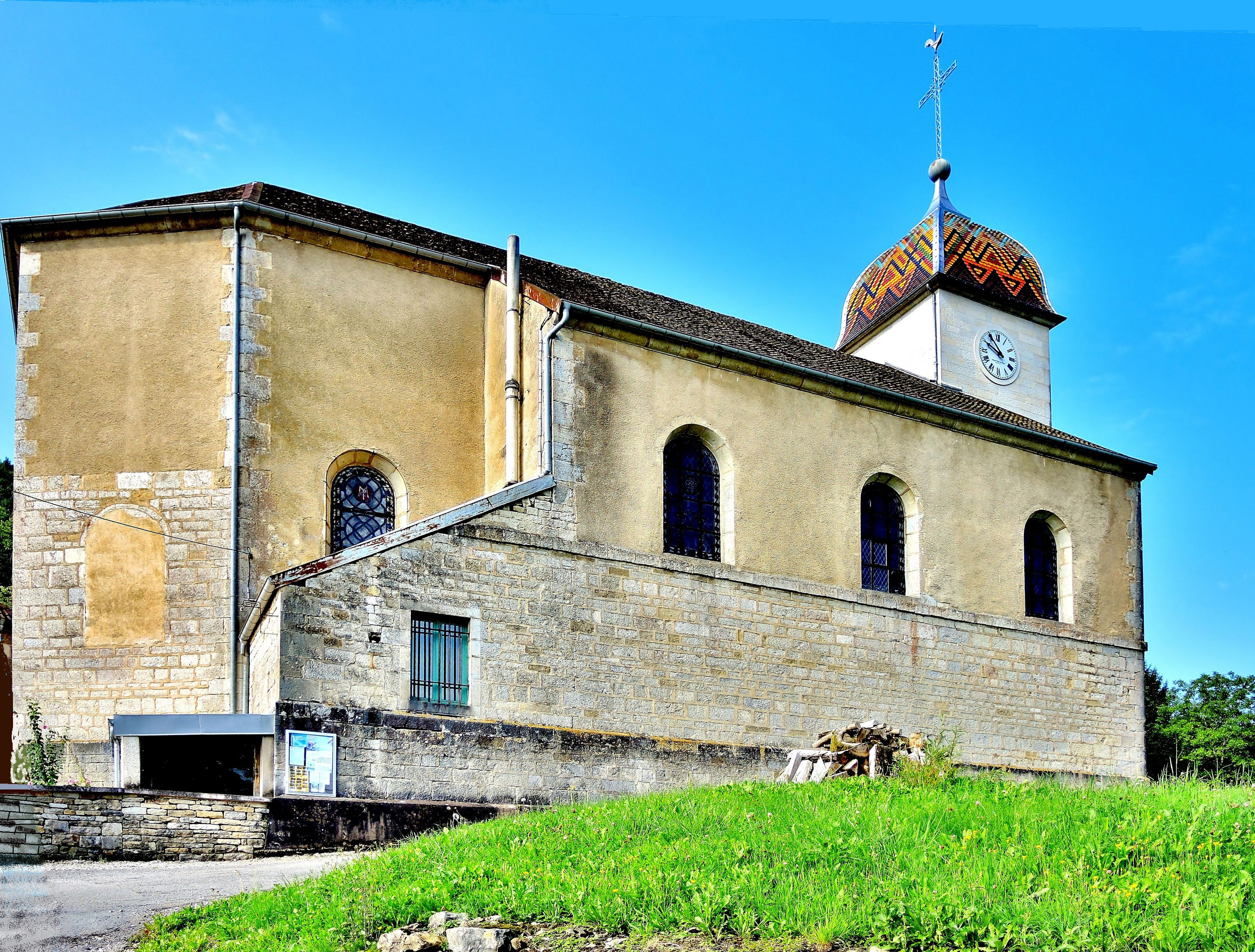
- The church in Roulans

- Coat of arms
- Location of Roulans
- Location within France Location within Bourgogne-Franche-Comté
- Coordinates: 47°19′02″N 6°14′03″E
- Country: France
- Region: Bourgogne-Franche-Comté
- Department: Doubs
- Arrondissement: Besançon
- Canton: Baume-les-Dames

Government
  - Mayor (2020–2026): Alain Jacquot
- Area^{1}: 8.31 km^{2} (3.21 sq mi)
- Highest elevation: 554 m (1,818 ft)
- Lowest elevation: 255 m (837 ft)
- Population (2023): 1,125
  - Density: 135/km^{2} (351/sq mi)
- Time zone: UTC+01:00 (CET)
  - Summer (DST): UTC+02:00 (CEST)
- INSEE/Postal code: 25508 /25640
- ^{1} French Land Register data, which excludes lakes, ponds, glaciers > 1 km^{2} (0.386 sq mi or 247 acres) and river estuaries.

Roulans (French pronunciation: [ʁulɑ̃]) is a commune in the Doubs department in the Bourgogne-Franche-Comté region in eastern France.

== Population ==
Historical population
Year	Pop.	±% p.a.
1968	504	—
1975	599	+2.50%
1982	710	+2.46%
1990	957	+3.80%
1999	1,005	+0.55%
2007	1,063	+0.70%
2012	1,130	+1.23%
2017	1,127	−0.05%
2023	1,125	−0.03%
Source: INSEE

== See also ==
- Communes of the Doubs department
