= Rougemont, Doubs =

Rougemont
- Commune
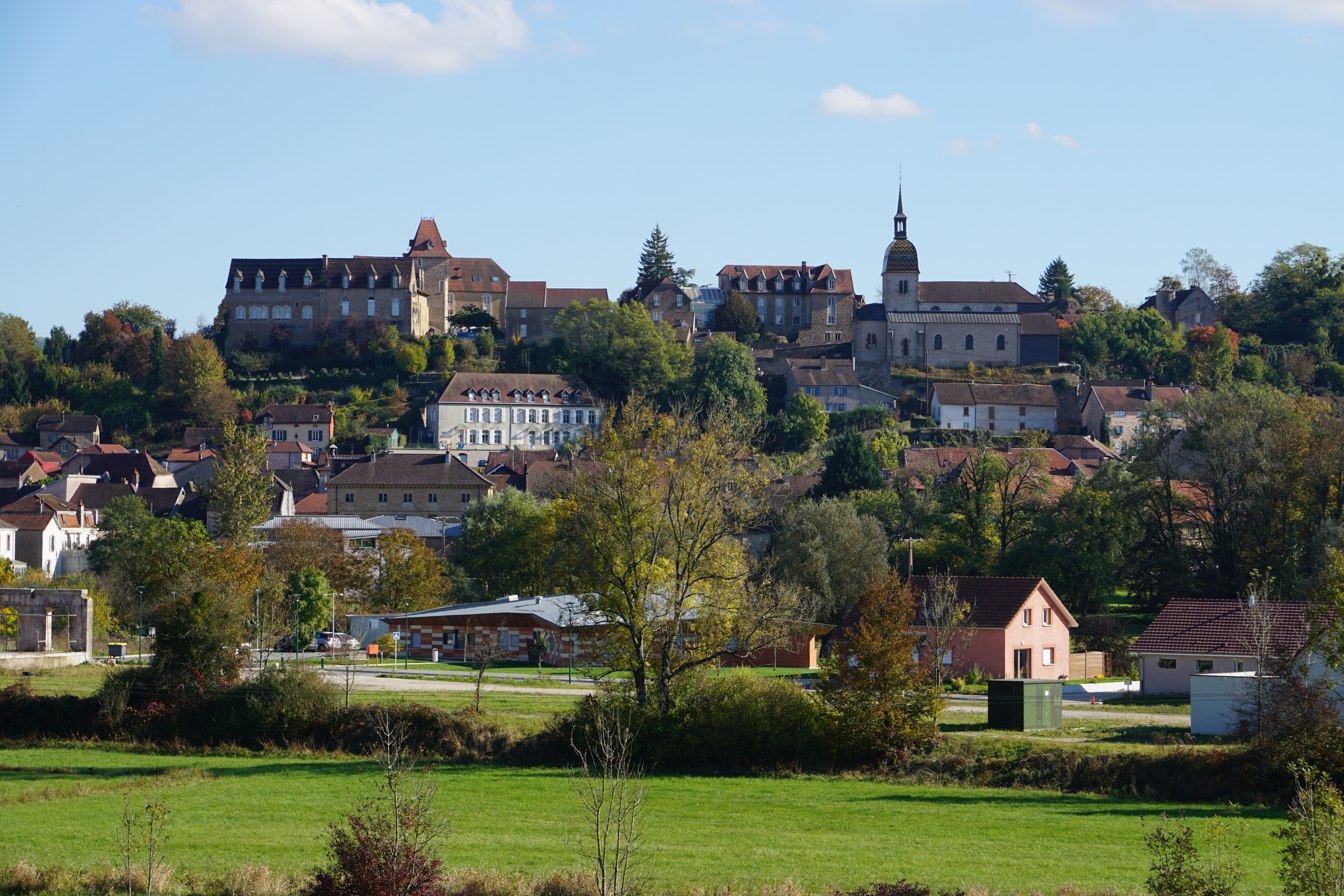
- A general view of Rougemont

- Coat of arms
- Location of Rougemont
- Location within France Location within Bourgogne-Franche-Comté
- Coordinates: 47°28′55″N 6°21′21″E
- Country: France
- Region: Bourgogne-Franche-Comté
- Department: Doubs
- Arrondissement: Besançon
- Canton: Baume-les-Dames

Government
  - Mayor (2020–2026): Thierry Salvi
- Area^{1}: 18.33 km^{2} (7.08 sq mi)
- Highest elevation: 405 m (1,329 ft)
- Lowest elevation: 245 m (804 ft)
- Population (2023): 1,051
  - Density: 57.34/km^{2} (148.5/sq mi)
- Time zone: UTC+01:00 (CET)
  - Summer (DST): UTC+02:00 (CEST)
- INSEE/Postal code: 25505 /25680
- ^{1} French Land Register data, which excludes lakes, ponds, glaciers > 1 km^{2} (0.386 sq mi or 247 acres) and river estuaries.

Rougemont (French pronunciation: [ʁuʒmɔ̃]) is a village and commune in the Doubs department in the Bourgogne-Franche-Comté region in eastern France.

== Population ==
Historical population
Year	Pop.	±% p.a.
1968	1,066	—
1975	1,110	+0.58%
1982	1,179	+0.87%
1990	1,200	+0.22%
1999	1,233	+0.30%
2007	1,241	+0.08%
2012	1,215	−0.42%
2017	1,124	−1.54%
2023	1,051	−1.11%
Source: INSEE

== See also ==
- Communes of the Doubs department
