= Vaux-les-Prés =

- Part of Chemaudin et Vaux
- Coat of arms
- Location of Vaux-les-Prés
- Location within France Location within Bourgogne-Franche-Comté
- Coordinates: 47°14′13″N 5°53′02″E
- Country: France
- Region: Bourgogne-Franche-Comté
- Department: Doubs
- Arrondissement: Besançon
- Canton: Besançon-1
- Commune: Chemaudin et Vaux
- Area^{1}: 5.14 km^{2} (1.98 sq mi)
- Highest elevation: 304 m (997 ft)
- Lowest elevation: 223 m (732 ft)
- Population (2014): 369
  - Density: 71.8/km^{2} (186/sq mi)
- Time zone: UTC+01:00 (CET)
  - Summer (DST): UTC+02:00 (CEST)
- Postal code: 25770
- ^{1} French Land Register data, which excludes lakes, ponds, glaciers > 1 km^{2} (0.386 sq mi or 247 acres) and river estuaries.

Vaux-les-Prés (French pronunciation: [vo le pʁe]) is a former commune in the Doubs department in the Bourgogne-Franche-Comté region in eastern France. On 1 January 2017, it was merged into the new commune Chemaudin et Vaux.

== See also ==
- Communes of the Doubs department
