= Chemaudin =

Commune in Doubs, France

- Part of Chemaudin et Vaux
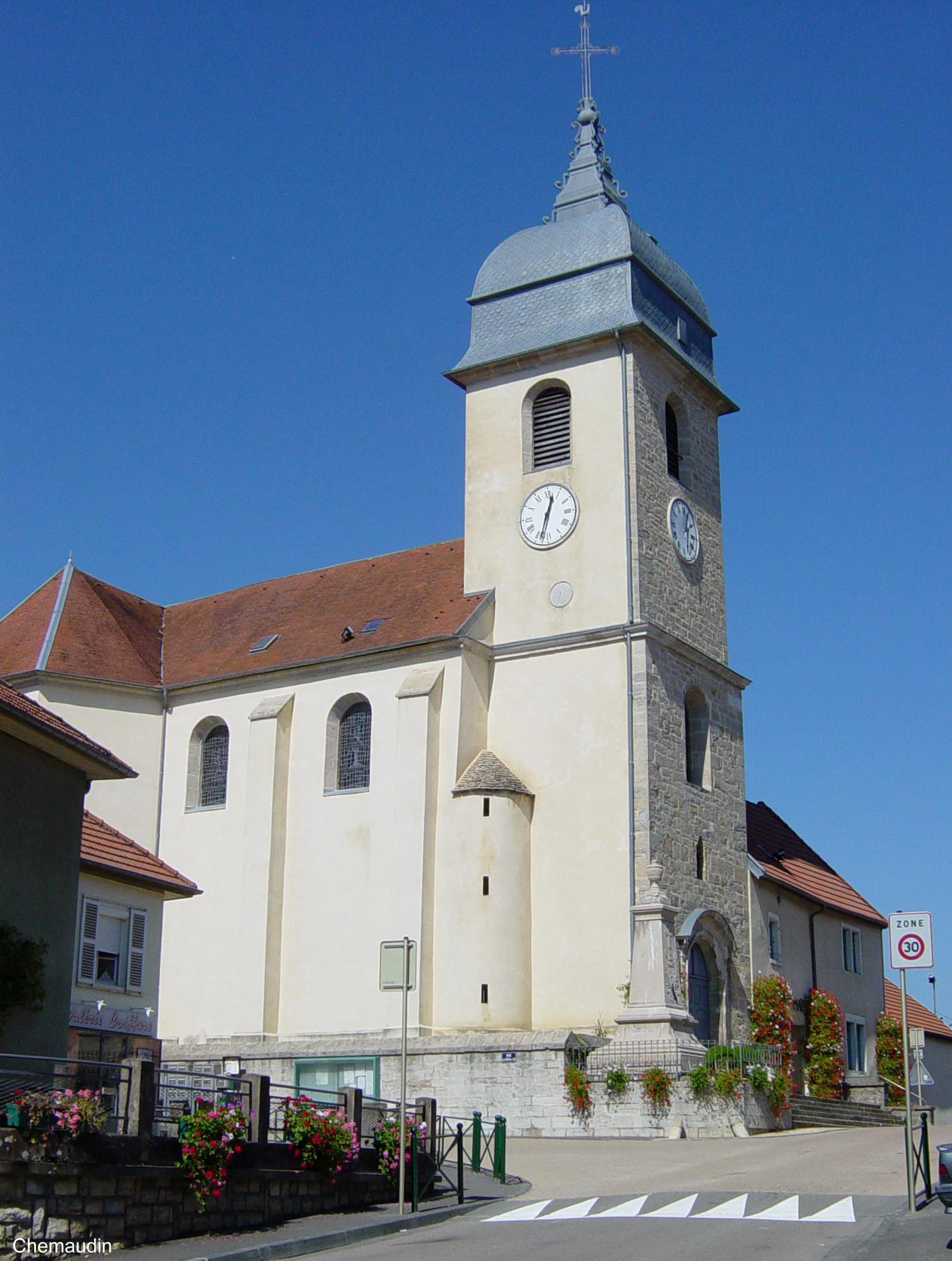
- Location of Chemaudin
- Location within France Location within Bourgogne-Franche-Comté
- Coordinates: 47°13′29″N 5°53′34″E
- Country: France
- Region: Bourgogne-Franche-Comté
- Department: Doubs
- Arrondissement: Besançon
- Canton: Besançon-1
- Commune: Chemaudin et Vaux
- Area^{1}: 7.3 km^{2} (2.8 sq mi)
- Highest elevation: 310 m (1,020 ft)
- Lowest elevation: 233 m (764 ft)
- Population (2014): 1,500
  - Density: 210/km^{2} (530/sq mi)
- Time zone: UTC+01:00 (CET)
  - Summer (DST): UTC+02:00 (CEST)
- Postal code: 25320
- ^{1} French Land Register data, which excludes lakes, ponds, glaciers > 1 km^{2} (0.386 sq mi or 247 acres) and river estuaries.

Chemaudin (French pronunciation: [ʃəmodɛ̃]) is a former commune in the Doubs department in the Bourgogne-Franche-Comté region in eastern France. On 1 January 2017, it was merged into the new commune Chemaudin et Vaux.

== Population ==
Historical population
Year	Pop.	±% p.a.
1962	409	—
1968	487	+2.95%
1975	600	+3.03%
1982	702	+2.27%
1990	941	+3.73%
1999	1,222	+2.95%
2006	1,430	+2.27%
2014	1,500	+0.60%
Source: EHESS and INSEE

== See also ==
- Communes of the Doubs department
