= Valleroy =

Valleroy may refer to the following places in France:

- Valleroy, Doubs, a commune in the Doubs department
- Valleroy, Haute-Marne, a commune in the Haute-Marne department
- Valleroy, Meurthe-et-Moselle, a commune in the Meurthe-et-Moselle department
