= Rancenay =

- Commune
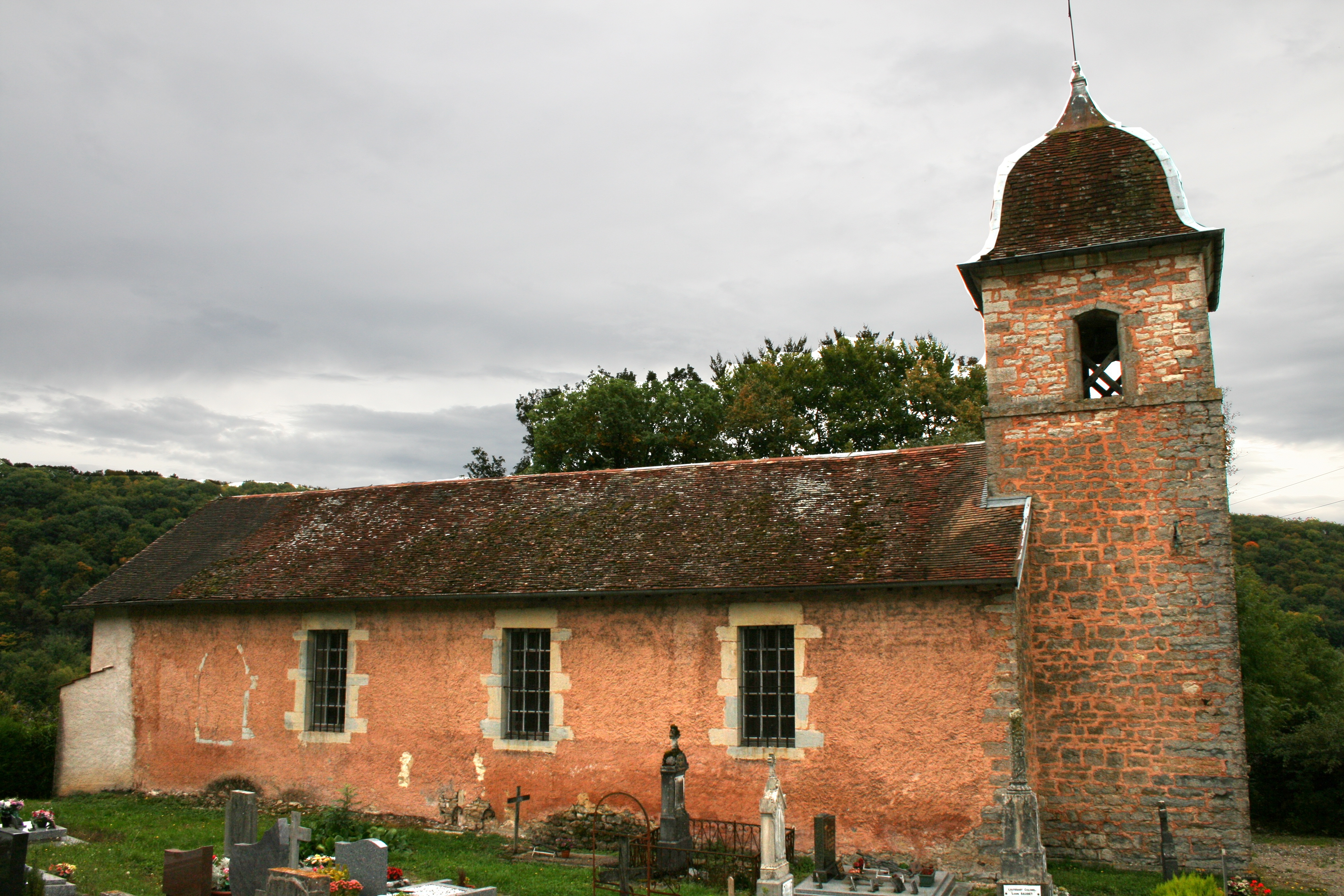
- The church in Rancenay

- Coat of arms
- Location of Rancenay
- Location within France Location within Bourgogne-Franche-Comté
- Coordinates: 47°11′15″N 5°57′02″E
- Country: France
- Region: Bourgogne-Franche-Comté
- Department: Doubs
- Arrondissement: Besançon
- Canton: Besançon-1
- Intercommunality: Grand Besançon Métropole

Government
  - Mayor (2020–2026): Nadine Dussaucy
- Area^{1}: 3.66 km^{2} (1.41 sq mi)
- Highest elevation: 372 m (1,220 ft)
- Lowest elevation: 226 m (741 ft)
- Population (2023): 436
  - Density: 119/km^{2} (309/sq mi)
- Time zone: UTC+01:00 (CET)
  - Summer (DST): UTC+02:00 (CEST)
- INSEE/Postal code: 25477 /25320
- ^{1} French Land Register data, which excludes lakes, ponds, glaciers > 1 km^{2} (0.386 sq mi or 247 acres) and river estuaries.

Rancenay (French pronunciation: [ʁɑ̃snɛ]) is a commune in the Doubs department in the Bourgogne-Franche-Comté region in eastern France.

== Geography ==
Rancenay lies 5 km (3.1 mi) northeast of Boussières. The commune is bisected by the river Doubs.

== Population ==
Historical population
Year	Pop.	±% p.a.
1968	105	—
1975	163	+6.48%
1982	180	+1.43%
1990	181	+0.07%
1999	250	+3.65%
2007	291	+1.92%
2012	291	+0.00%
2017	352	+3.88%
2023	436	+3.63%
Source: INSEE

== See also ==
- Communes of the Doubs department
