= Grand Besançon Métropole =

Coordinates: 47.24°N 6.02°E

- Communauté urbaine

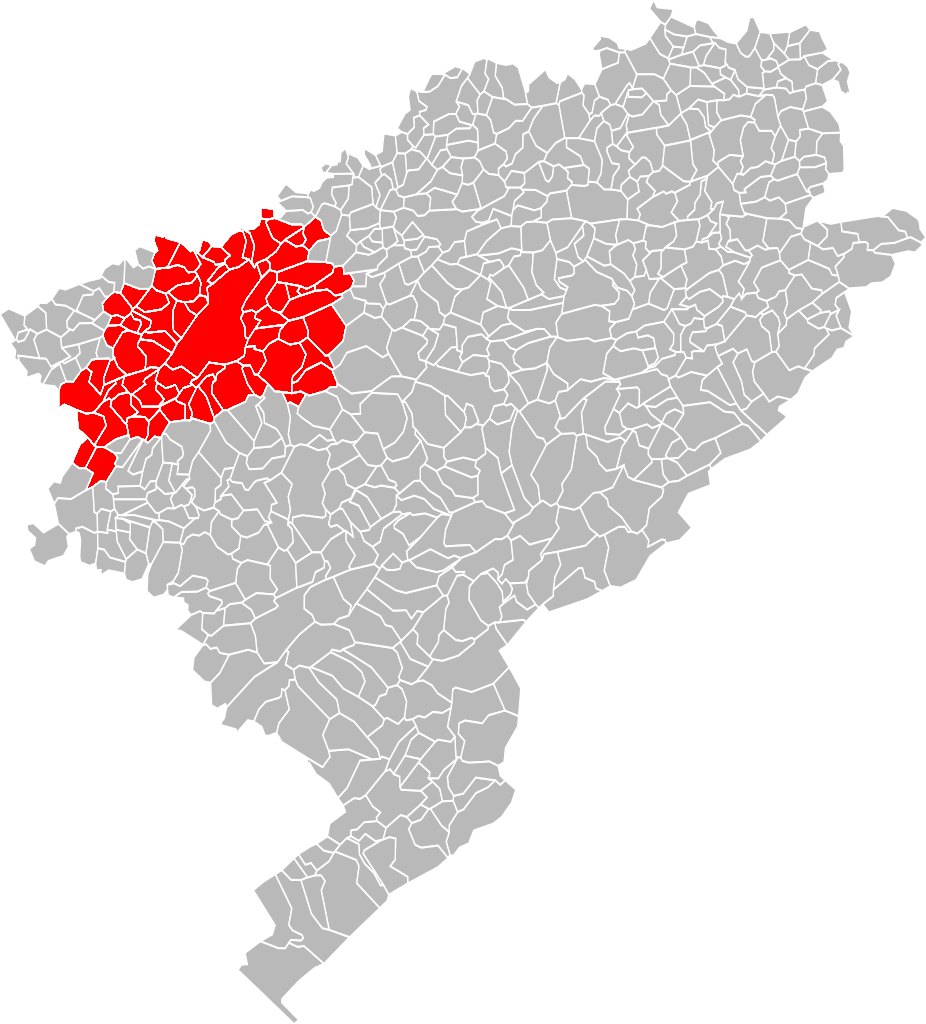
- Location in the Doubs department
- Country: France
- Region: Bourgogne-Franche-Comté
- Department: Doubs
- No. of communes: {{{nbcomm}}}
- Established: 2001

Government
  - President (2026-2032): Ludovic Fagaut (LR)
- Area: 528.6 km^{2} (204.1 sq mi)
- Population (2022): 198,387
  - Density: 375.3/km^{2} (972.0/sq mi)
- Website: www.grandbesancon.fr

Grand Besançon Métropole is the urban community (communauté urbaine), an intercommunal structure, centred on the city of Besançon. It is located in the Doubs department, in the Bourgogne-Franche-Comté region, northeastern France.

It was created in January 2021 Communauté d'agglomération Grand Besançon, which was transformed into an urban community on 1 July 2019. Its area is 528.6 km^{2}.

Its population was 198,387 in 2022, of which 120,057 (60%) in Besançon proper. Its budget is € 371.9 million (2024).

== Composition ==
The urban community consists of the following 67 communes:

1. Amagney
2. Audeux
3. Les Auxons
4. Avanne-Aveney
5. Besançon
6. Beure
7. Bonnay
8. Boussières
9. Braillans
10. Busy
11. Byans-sur-Doubs
12. Chalèze
13. Chalezeule
14. Champagney
15. Champoux
16. Champvans-les-Moulins
17. Châtillon-le-Duc
18. Chaucenne
19. Chemaudin et Vaux
20. La Chevillotte
21. Chevroz
22. Cussey-sur-l'Ognon
23. Dannemarie-sur-Crète
24. Deluz
25. Devecey
26. École-Valentin
27. Fontain
28. Franois
29. Geneuille
30. Gennes
31. Grandfontaine
32. Larnod
33. Mamirolle
34. Marchaux-Chaudefontaine
35. Mazerolles-le-Salin
36. Mérey-Vieilley
37. Miserey-Salines
38. Montfaucon
39. Montferrand-le-Château
40. Morre
41. Nancray
42. Noironte
43. Novillars
44. Osselle-Routelle
45. Palise
46. Pelousey
47. Pirey
48. Pouilley-Français
49. Pouilley-les-Vignes
50. Pugey
51. Rancenay
52. Roche-lez-Beaupré
53. Roset-Fluans
54. Saint-Vit
55. Saône
56. Serre-les-Sapins
57. Tallenay
58. Thise
59. Thoraise
60. Torpes
61. Vaire
62. Velesmes-Essarts
63. Venise
64. La Vèze
65. Vieilley
66. Villars-Saint-Georges
67. Vorges-les-Pins
