= Chevroz =

- Commune
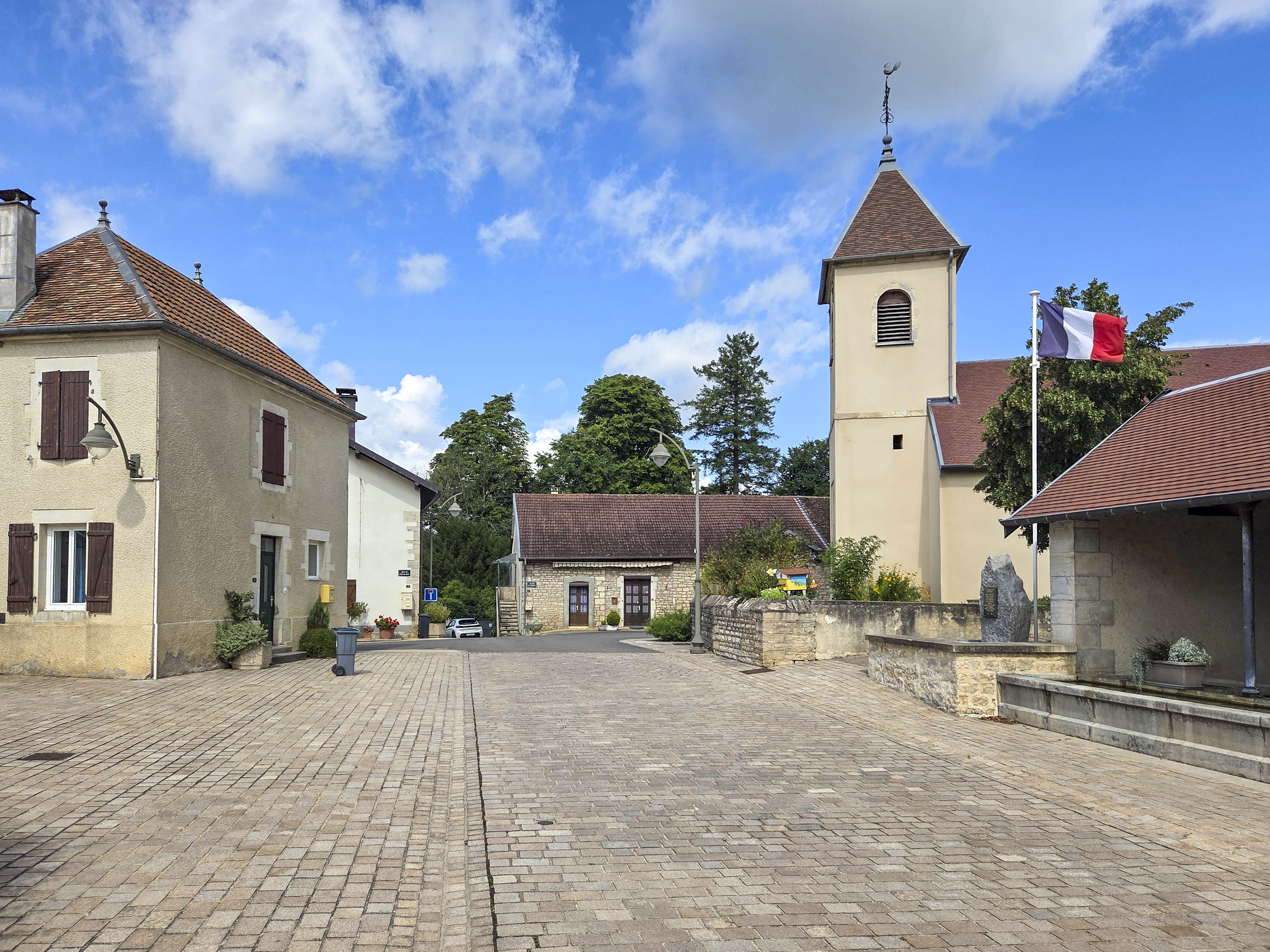
- The village centre
- Location of Chevroz
- Location within France Location within Bourgogne-Franche-Comté
- Coordinates: 47°20′03″N 5°59′53″E
- Country: France
- Region: Bourgogne-Franche-Comté
- Department: Doubs
- Arrondissement: Besançon
- Canton: Baume-les-Dames
- Intercommunality: Grand Besançon Métropole

Government
  - Mayor (2020–2026): Franck Bernard
- Area^{1}: 1.98 km^{2} (0.76 sq mi)
- Highest elevation: 251 m (823 ft)
- Lowest elevation: 210 m (690 ft)
- Population (2023): 143
  - Density: 72.2/km^{2} (187/sq mi)
- Time zone: UTC+01:00 (CET)
  - Summer (DST): UTC+02:00 (CEST)
- INSEE/Postal code: 25153 /25870
- ^{1} French Land Register data, which excludes lakes, ponds, glaciers > 1 km^{2} (0.386 sq mi or 247 acres) and river estuaries.

Chevroz is a commune in the Doubs department in the Bourgogne-Franche-Comté region in eastern France.

== Population ==
Historical population
Year	Pop.	±% p.a.
1968	84	—
1975	82	−0.34%
1982	84	+0.34%
1990	77	−1.08%
1999	81	+0.56%
2007	104	+3.17%
2012	104	+0.00%
2017	131	+4.72%
2023	143	+1.47%
Source: INSEE

== See also ==
- Communes of the Doubs department
