= Dannemarie-sur-Crète =

- Commune
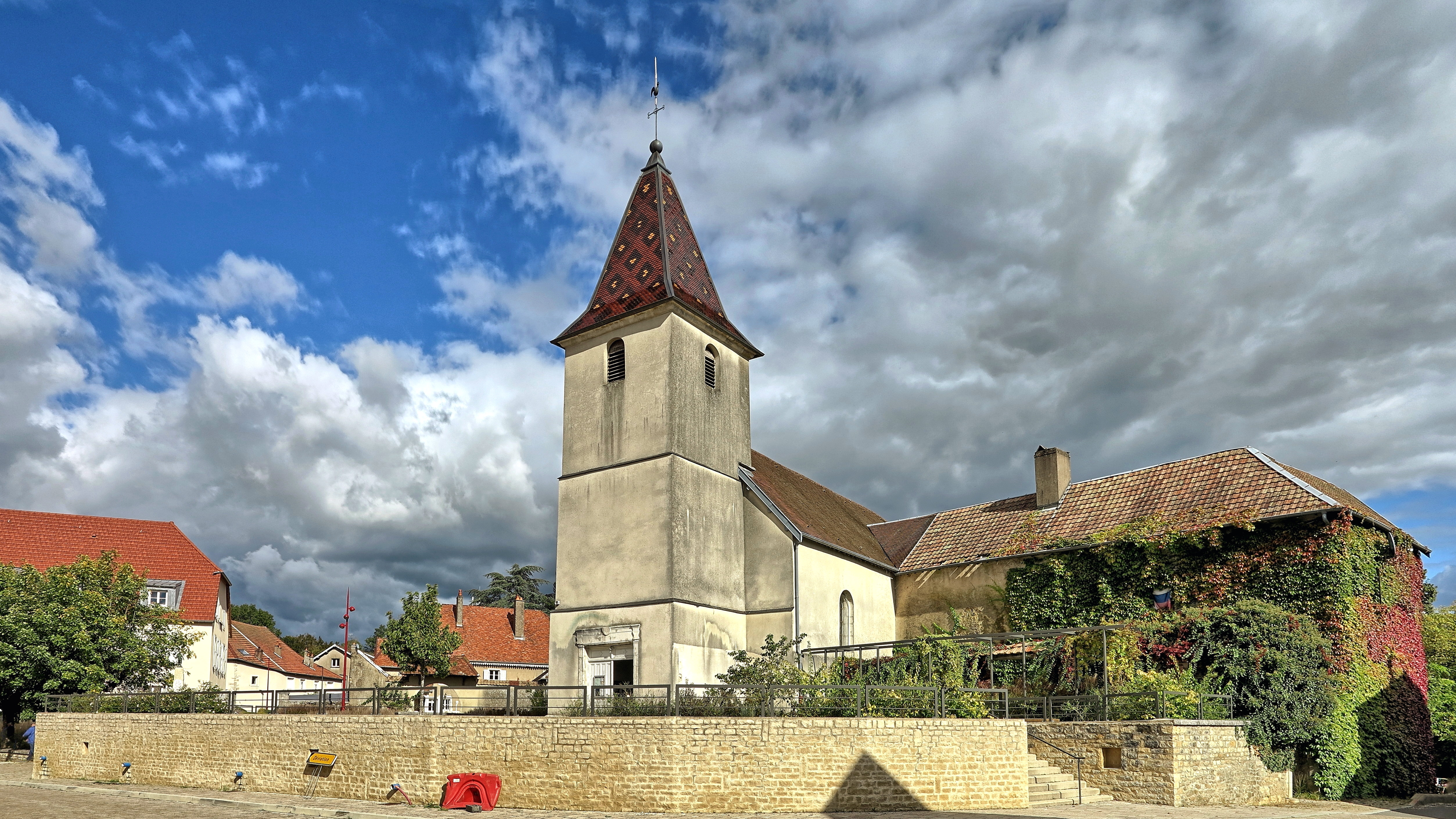
- The church Notre-Dame de l'Assomption de la Vierge
- Location of Dannemarie-sur-Crète
- Location within France Location within Bourgogne-Franche-Comté
- Coordinates: 47°12′24″N 5°51′59″E
- Country: France
- Region: Bourgogne-Franche-Comté
- Department: Doubs
- Arrondissement: Besançon
- Canton: Besançon-1
- Intercommunality: Grand Besançon Métropole

Government
  - Mayor (2020–2026): Sébastien Perrin
- Area^{1}: 4.06 km^{2} (1.57 sq mi)
- Highest elevation: 303 m (994 ft)
- Lowest elevation: 239 m (784 ft)
- Population (2023): 1,486
  - Density: 366/km^{2} (948/sq mi)
- Time zone: UTC+01:00 (CET)
  - Summer (DST): UTC+02:00 (CEST)
- INSEE/Postal code: 25195 /25410
- ^{1} French Land Register data, which excludes lakes, ponds, glaciers > 1 km^{2} (0.386 sq mi or 247 acres) and river estuaries.

Dannemarie-sur-Crète (French pronunciation: [danmaʁi syʁ kʁɛt]) is a commune in the Doubs department in the Bourgogne-Franche-Comté region in eastern France.

== Population ==
Historical population
Year	Pop.	±% p.a.
1968	239	—
1975	444	+9.25%
1982	653	+5.67%
1990	774	+2.15%
1999	938	+2.16%
2007	1,294	+4.10%
2012	1,346	+0.79%
2017	1,473	+1.82%
2023	1,486	+0.15%
Source: INSEE

== See also ==
- Communes of the Doubs department
