= Villars-Saint-Georges =

- Commune
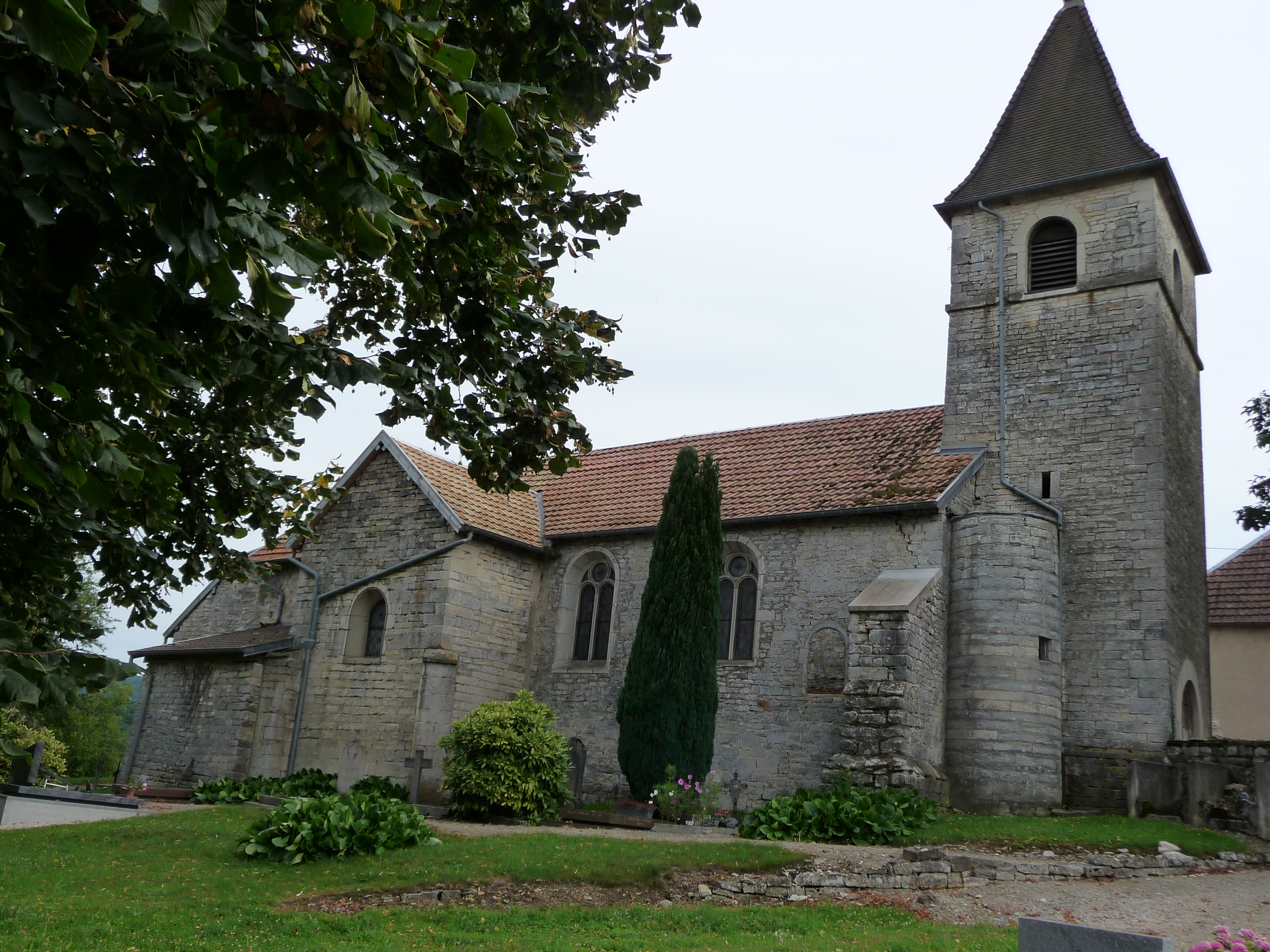
- The church in Villars-Saint-Georges

- Coat of arms
- Location of Villars-Saint-Georges
- Location within France Location within Bourgogne-Franche-Comté
- Coordinates: 47°07′34″N 5°49′39″E
- Country: France
- Region: Bourgogne-Franche-Comté
- Department: Doubs
- Arrondissement: Besançon
- Canton: Saint-Vit
- Intercommunality: Grand Besançon Métropole

Government
  - Mayor (2020–2026): Damien Legain
- Area^{1}: 5.15 km^{2} (1.99 sq mi)
- Highest elevation: 310 m (1,020 ft)
- Lowest elevation: 220 m (720 ft)
- Population (2023): 283
  - Density: 55.0/km^{2} (142/sq mi)
- Time zone: UTC+01:00 (CET)
  - Summer (DST): UTC+02:00 (CEST)
- INSEE/Postal code: 25616 /25410
- ^{1} French Land Register data, which excludes lakes, ponds, glaciers > 1 km^{2} (0.386 sq mi or 247 acres) and river estuaries.

Villars-Saint-Georges (French pronunciation: [vilaʁ sɛ̃ ʒɔʁʒ]) is a commune in the Doubs department in the Bourgogne-Franche-Comté region in eastern France.

== Population ==
Historical population
Year	Pop.	±% p.a.
1968	134	—
1975	120	−1.56%
1982	143	+2.54%
1990	153	+0.85%
1999	181	+1.88%
2007	245	+3.86%
2012	249	+0.32%
2017	273	+1.86%
2023	283	+0.60%
Source: INSEE

== See also ==
- Communes of the Doubs department
