= Franois =

- Commune
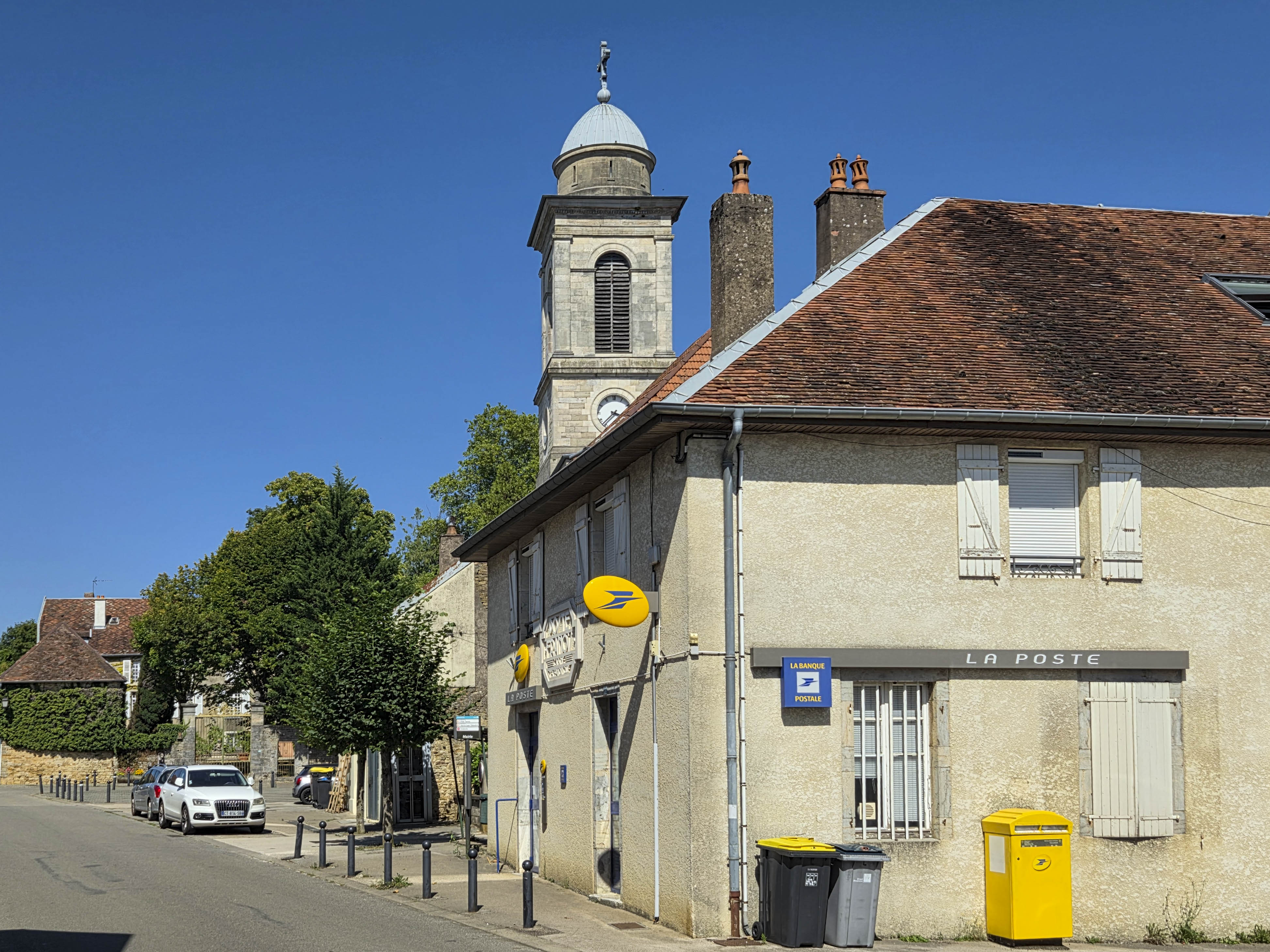
- The centre of the village
- Location of Franois
- Location within France Location within Bourgogne-Franche-Comté
- Coordinates: 47°14′00″N 5°55′35″E
- Country: France
- Region: Bourgogne-Franche-Comté
- Department: Doubs
- Arrondissement: Besançon
- Canton: Besançon-1
- Intercommunality: Grand Besançon Métropole

Government
  - Mayor (2020–2026): Émile Bourgeois
- Area^{1}: 7.29 km^{2} (2.81 sq mi)
- Highest elevation: 312 m (1,024 ft)
- Lowest elevation: 248 m (814 ft)
- Population (2023): 2,257
  - Density: 310/km^{2} (802/sq mi)
- Time zone: UTC+01:00 (CET)
  - Summer (DST): UTC+02:00 (CEST)
- INSEE/Postal code: 25258 /25770
- ^{1} French Land Register data, which excludes lakes, ponds, glaciers > 1 km^{2} (0.386 sq mi or 247 acres) and river estuaries.

Franois (French pronunciation: [fʁanwa]) is a commune in the Doubs department in the Bourgogne-Franche-Comté region in eastern France

== Population ==
Historical population
Year	Pop.	±% p.a.
1968	888	—
1975	1,242	+4.91%
1982	1,293	+0.58%
1990	1,558	+2.36%
1999	1,779	+1.48%
2007	1,917	+0.94%
2012	2,031	+1.16%
2017	2,340	+2.87%
2023	2,257	−0.60%
Source: INSEE
