= Palise =

- Commune
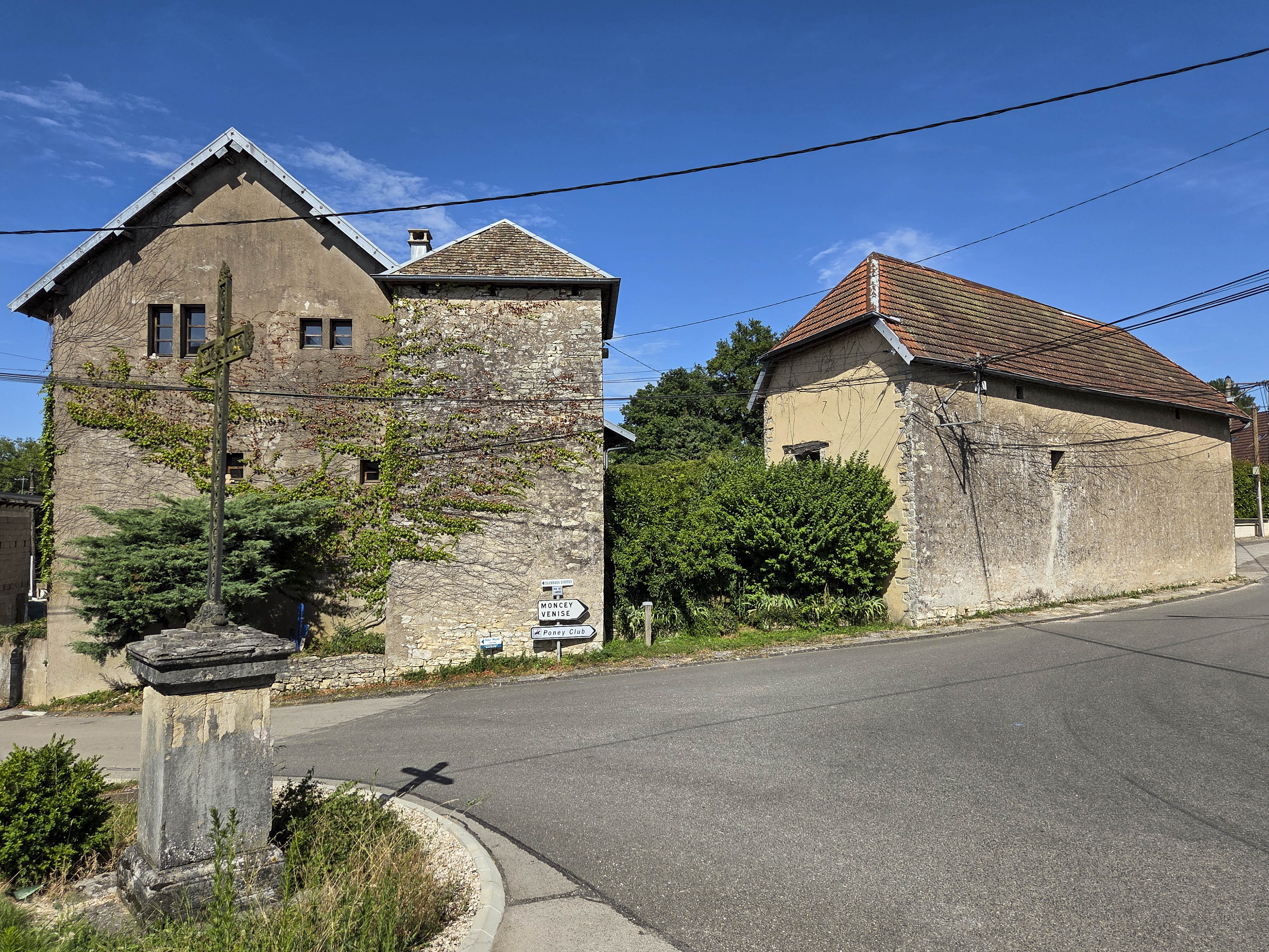
- Marshal Moncey's house

- Coat of arms
- Location of Palise
- Location within France Location within Bourgogne-Franche-Comté
- Coordinates: 47°22′21″N 6°05′30″E
- Country: France
- Region: Bourgogne-Franche-Comté
- Department: Doubs
- Arrondissement: Besançon
- Canton: Baume-les-Dames
- Intercommunality: Grand Besançon Métropole

Government
  - Mayor (2020–2026): Daniel Gautherot
- Area^{1}: 2.09 km^{2} (0.81 sq mi)
- Highest elevation: 266 m (873 ft)
- Lowest elevation: 215 m (705 ft)
- Population (2023): 150
  - Density: 72/km^{2} (190/sq mi)
- Time zone: UTC+01:00 (CET)
  - Summer (DST): UTC+02:00 (CEST)
- INSEE/Postal code: 25444 /25870
- ^{1} French Land Register data, which excludes lakes, ponds, glaciers > 1 km^{2} (0.386 sq mi or 247 acres) and river estuaries.

Palise (French pronunciation: [paliz]) is a commune in the Doubs department in the Bourgogne-Franche-Comté region in eastern France.

== Population ==
Historical population
Year	Pop.	±% p.a.
1968	40	—
1975	39	−0.36%
1982	61	+6.60%
1990	67	+1.18%
1999	101	+4.67%
2007	117	+1.86%
2012	136	+3.06%
2017	141	+0.72%
2023	150	+1.04%
Source: INSEE

== See also ==
- Communes of the Doubs department
