= Braillans =

- Commune
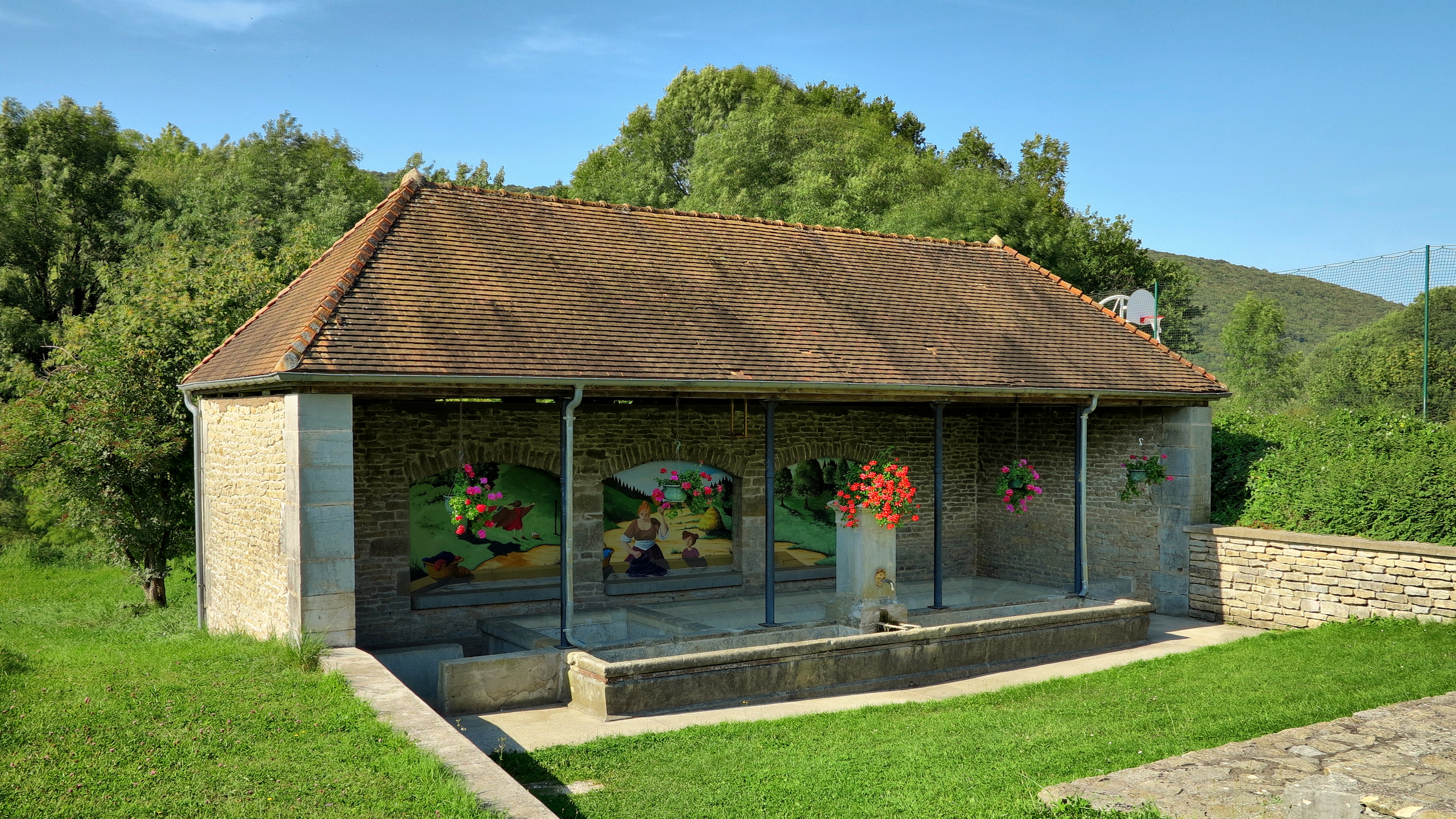
- The wash house in Braillans

- Coat of arms
- Location of Braillans
- Location within France Location within Bourgogne-Franche-Comté
- Coordinates: 47°18′36″N 6°05′27″E
- Country: France
- Region: Bourgogne-Franche-Comté
- Department: Doubs
- Arrondissement: Besançon
- Canton: Besançon-4
- Intercommunality: Grand Besançon Métropole

Government
  - Mayor (2020–2026): Alain Blessemaille
- Area^{1}: 1.95 km^{2} (0.75 sq mi)
- Highest elevation: 450 m (1,480 ft)
- Lowest elevation: 329 m (1,079 ft)
- Population (2023): 203
  - Density: 104/km^{2} (270/sq mi)
- Time zone: UTC+01:00 (CET)
  - Summer (DST): UTC+02:00 (CEST)
- INSEE/Postal code: 25086 /25640
- ^{1} French Land Register data, which excludes lakes, ponds, glaciers > 1 km^{2} (0.386 sq mi or 247 acres) and river estuaries.

Braillans (French pronunciation: [bʁajɑ̃]) is a commune in the Doubs department in the Bourgogne-Franche-Comté region in eastern France.

== Population ==
Historical population
Year	Pop.	±% p.a.
1968	36	—
1975	56	+6.52%
1982	68	+2.81%
1990	88	+3.28%
1999	100	+1.43%
2007	132	+3.53%
2012	161	+4.05%
2017	205	+4.95%
2023	203	−0.16%
Source: INSEE

== See also ==
- Communes of the Doubs department
