= Velesmes-Essarts =

- Commune
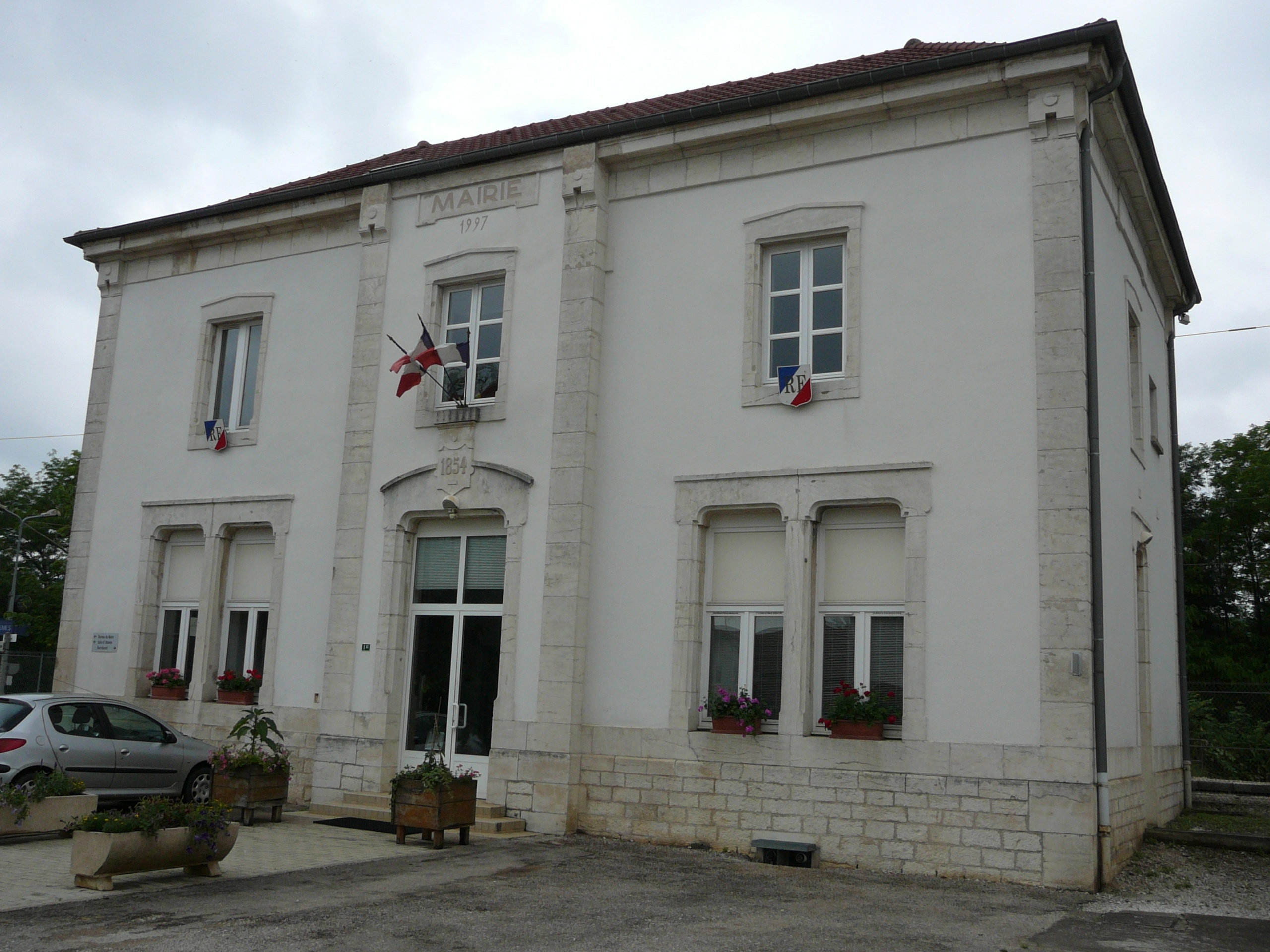
- Town hall

- Coat of arms
- Location of Velesmes-Essarts
- Location within France Location within Bourgogne-Franche-Comté
- Coordinates: 47°11′31″N 5°52′32″E
- Country: France
- Region: Bourgogne-Franche-Comté
- Department: Doubs
- Arrondissement: Besançon
- Canton: Saint-Vit
- Intercommunality: Grand Besançon Métropole

Government
  - Mayor (2020–2026): Jean-Marc Jouffroy
- Area^{1}: 2.92 km^{2} (1.13 sq mi)
- Highest elevation: 295 m (968 ft)
- Lowest elevation: 230 m (750 ft)
- Population (2023): 369
  - Density: 126/km^{2} (327/sq mi)
- Time zone: UTC+01:00 (CET)
  - Summer (DST): UTC+02:00 (CEST)
- INSEE/Postal code: 25594 /25410
- ^{1} French Land Register data, which excludes lakes, ponds, glaciers > 1 km^{2} (0.386 sq mi or 247 acres) and river estuaries.

Velesmes-Essarts (French pronunciation: [vəlɛm ɛsaʁ]) is a commune in the Doubs department in the Bourgogne-Franche-Comté region in eastern France.

== Population ==
Historical population
Year	Pop.	±% p.a.
1968	163	—
1975	253	+6.48%
1982	312	+3.04%
1990	318	+0.24%
1999	302	−0.57%
2007	312	+0.41%
2012	324	+0.76%
2017	348	+1.44%
2023	369	+0.98%
Source: INSEE

== See also ==
- Communes of the Doubs department
