= Cussey-sur-l'Ognon =

- Commune
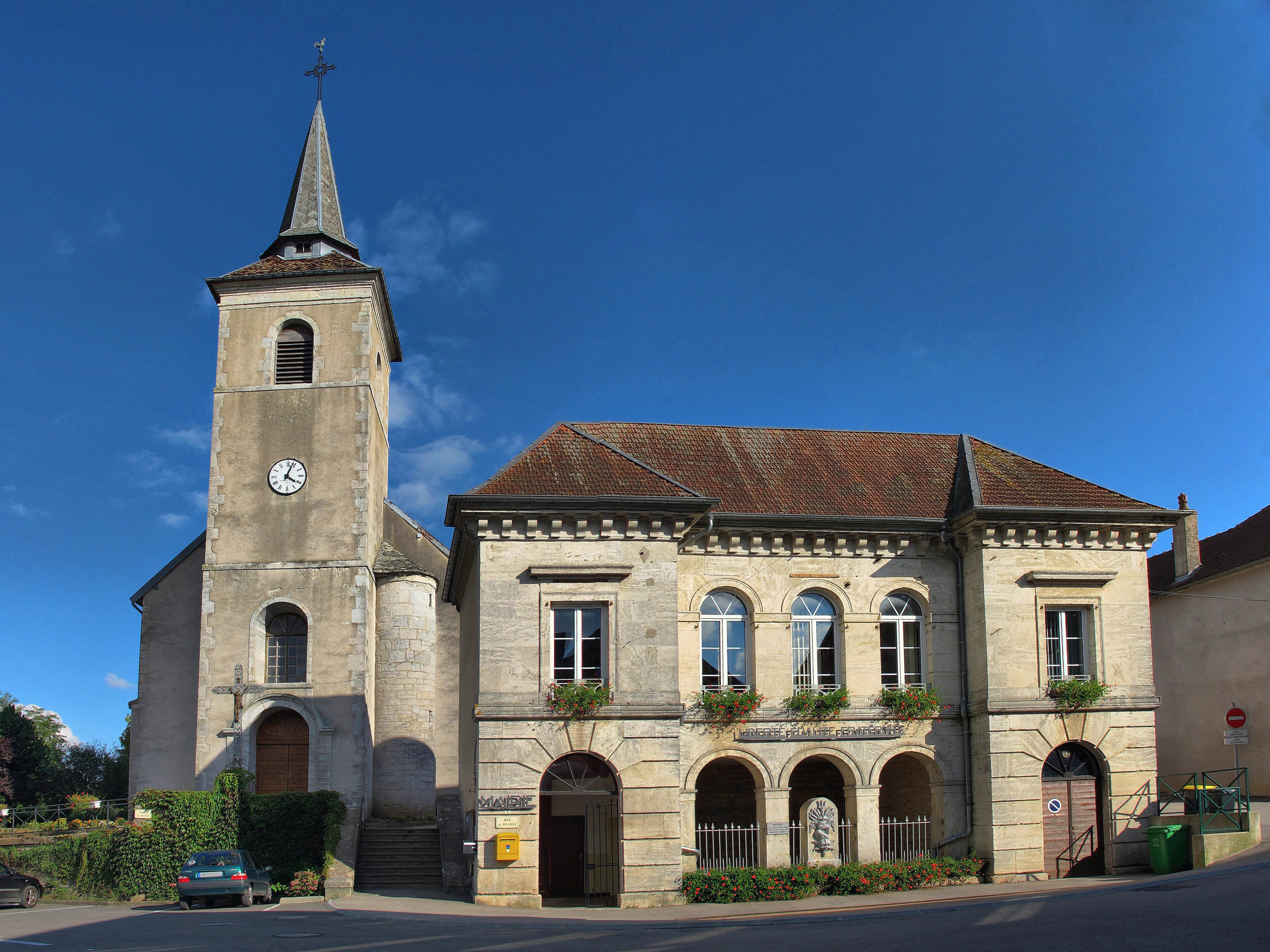
- The church and the town hall-washhouse
- Location of Cussey-sur-l'Ognon
- Location within France Location within Bourgogne-Franche-Comté
- Coordinates: 47°20′23″N 5°56′18″E
- Country: France
- Region: Bourgogne-Franche-Comté
- Department: Doubs
- Arrondissement: Besançon
- Canton: Baume-les-Dames
- Intercommunality: Grand Besançon Métropole

Government
  - Mayor (2020–2026): Jean-François Ménestrier
- Area^{1}: 7.55 km^{2} (2.92 sq mi)
- Highest elevation: 256 m (840 ft)
- Lowest elevation: 206 m (676 ft)
- Population (2023): 1,055
  - Density: 140/km^{2} (362/sq mi)
- Time zone: UTC+01:00 (CET)
  - Summer (DST): UTC+02:00 (CEST)
- INSEE/Postal code: 25186 /25870
- ^{1} French Land Register data, which excludes lakes, ponds, glaciers > 1 km^{2} (0.386 sq mi or 247 acres) and river estuaries.

Cussey-sur-l'Ognon (French pronunciation: [kysɛ syʁ lɔɲɔ̃], literally Cussey on the Ognon) is a commune in the Doubs department in the Bourgogne-Franche-Comté region in eastern France.

== Population ==
Historical population
Year	Pop.	±% p.a.
1968	197	—
1975	324	+7.37%
1982	478	+5.71%
1990	570	+2.22%
1999	621	+0.96%
2007	893	+4.65%
2012	964	+1.54%
2017	1,045	+1.63%
2023	1,055	+0.16%
Source: INSEE

== See also ==
- Ognon river
- Communes of the Doubs department
