= Chalezeule =

- Commune
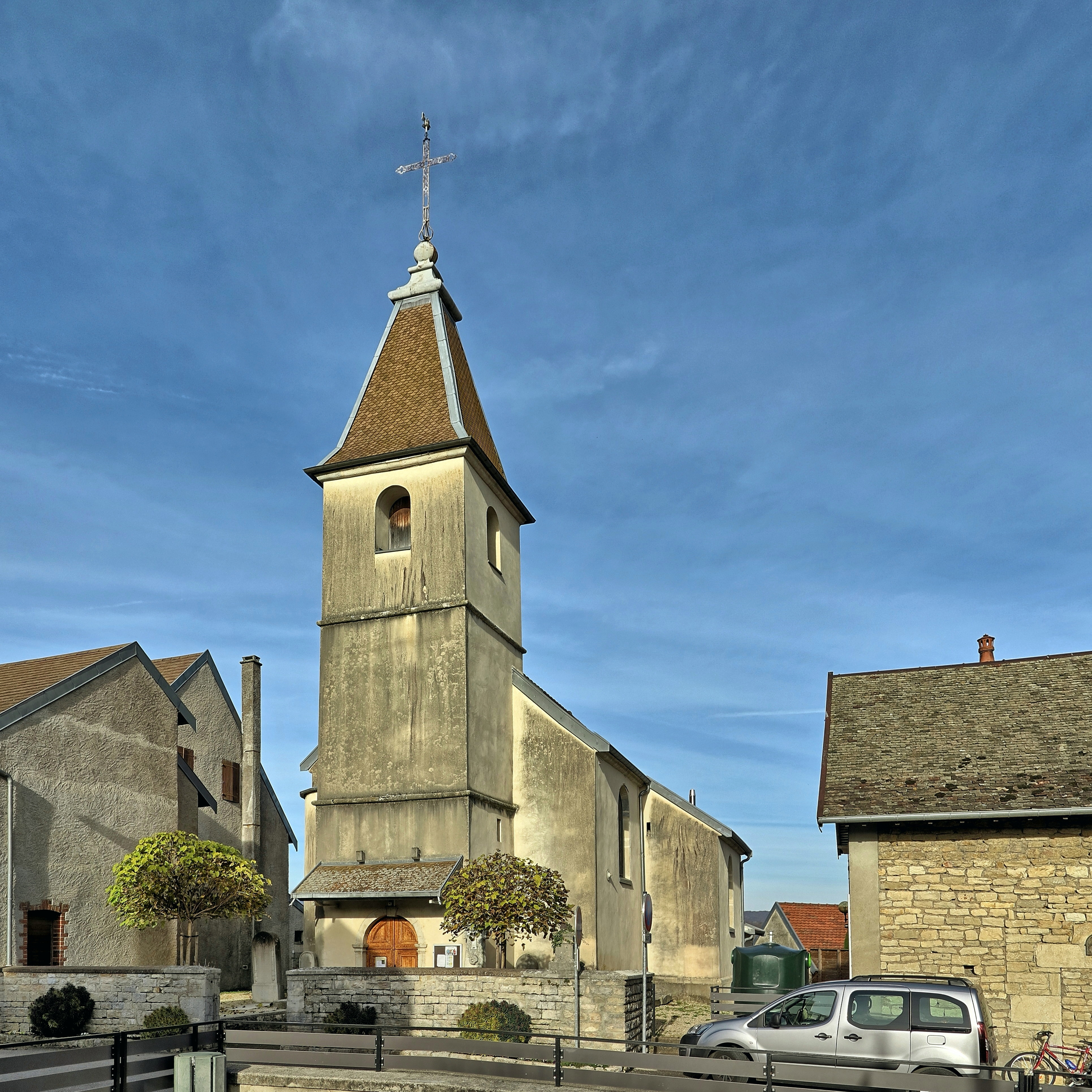
- Church

- Coat of arms
- Location of Chalezeule
- Location within France Location within Bourgogne-Franche-Comté
- Coordinates: 47°15′36″N 6°04′33″E
- Country: France
- Region: Bourgogne-Franche-Comté
- Department: Doubs
- Arrondissement: Besançon
- Canton: Besançon-4
- Intercommunality: Grand Besançon Métropole

Government
  - Mayor (2020–2026): Christian Magnin-Feysot
- Area^{1}: 3.94 km^{2} (1.52 sq mi)
- Highest elevation: 400 m (1,300 ft)
- Lowest elevation: 240 m (790 ft)
- Population (2023): 1,335
  - Density: 339/km^{2} (878/sq mi)
- Time zone: UTC+01:00 (CET)
  - Summer (DST): UTC+02:00 (CEST)
- INSEE/Postal code: 25112 /25220
- ^{1} French Land Register data, which excludes lakes, ponds, glaciers > 1 km^{2} (0.386 sq mi or 247 acres) and river estuaries.

Chalezeule (French pronunciation: [ʃalzœl]) is a commune in the Doubs department in the Bourgogne-Franche-Comté region in eastern France.

== Population ==
Historical population
Year	Pop.	±% p.a.
1968	699	—
1975	764	+1.28%
1982	812	+0.87%
1990	944	+1.90%
1999	952	+0.09%
2007	1,071	+1.48%
2012	1,229	+2.79%
2017	1,292	+1.00%
2023	1,335	+0.55%
Source: INSEE

== See also ==
- Communes of the Doubs department
