= Canton of Besançon-4 =

Coordinates: 47.25°N 6.05°E

The canton of Besançon-4 is an administrative division of the Doubs department, eastern France. It was created at the French canton reorganisation which came into effect in March 2015. Its seat is in Besançon.

It consists of the following communes:

1. Besançon (partly)
2. Braillans
3. Chalèze
4. Chalezeule
5. Champoux
6. Marchaux-Chaudefontaine
7. Thise
