= Grandfontaine, Doubs =

Grandfontaine
- Commune
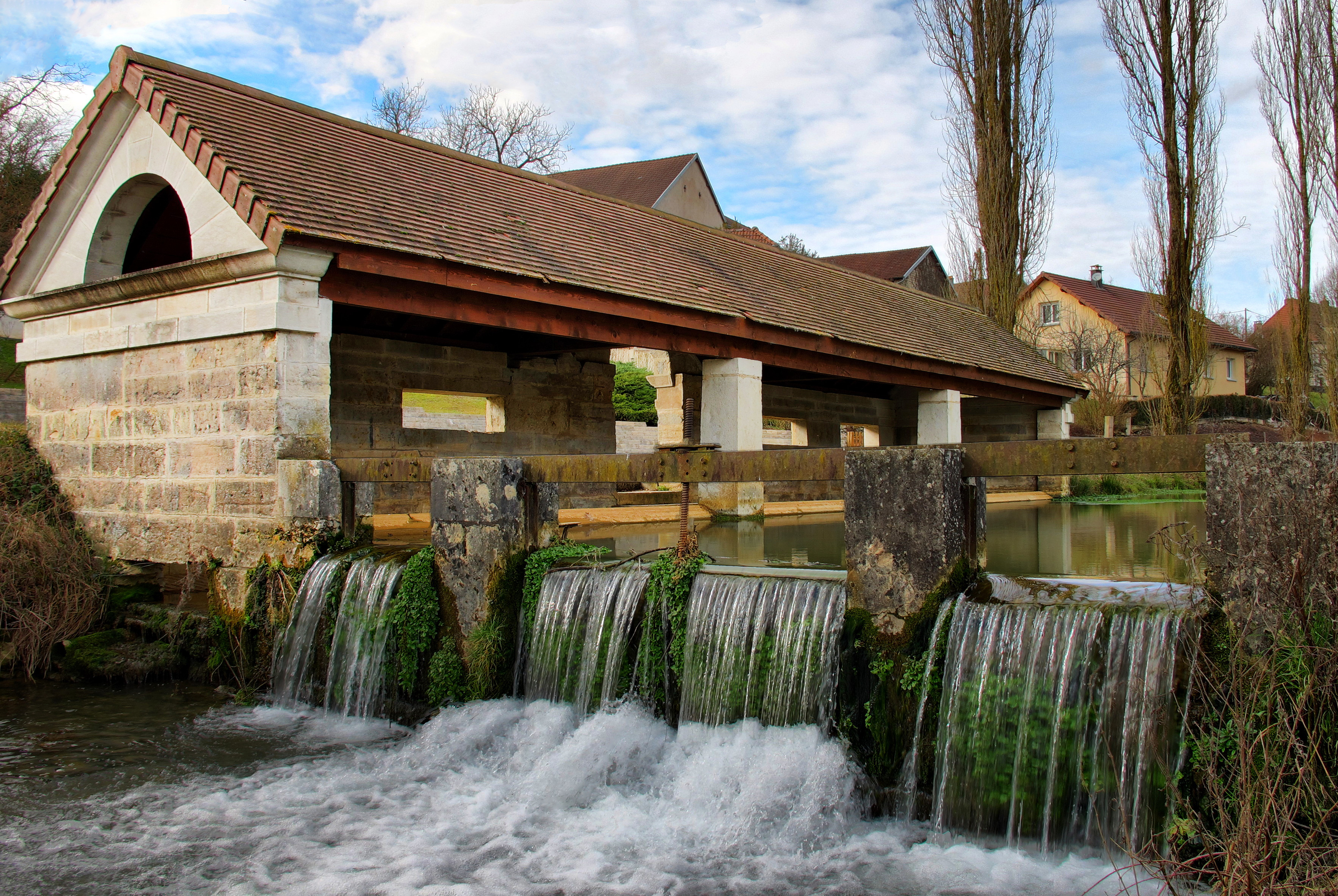
- The wash house in Grandfontaine
- Location of Grandfontaine
- Location within France Location within Bourgogne-Franche-Comté
- Coordinates: 47°11′54″N 5°54′04″E
- Country: France
- Region: Bourgogne-Franche-Comté
- Department: Doubs
- Arrondissement: Besançon
- Canton: Besançon-1
- Intercommunality: Grand Besançon Métropole

Government
  - Mayor (2020–2026): Henri Bermond
- Area^{1}: 5.68 km^{2} (2.19 sq mi)
- Highest elevation: 295 m (968 ft)
- Lowest elevation: 224 m (735 ft)
- Population (2023): 1,827
  - Density: 322/km^{2} (833/sq mi)
- Time zone: UTC+01:00 (CET)
  - Summer (DST): UTC+02:00 (CEST)
- INSEE/Postal code: 25287 /25320
- ^{1} French Land Register data, which excludes lakes, ponds, glaciers > 1 km^{2} (0.386 sq mi or 247 acres) and river estuaries.

Grandfontaine (French pronunciation: [ɡʁɑ̃fɔ̃tɛn]) is a commune in the Doubs department in the Bourgogne-Franche-Comté region in eastern France.

== Population ==
Historical population
Year	Pop.	±% p.a.
1968	476	—
1975	898	+9.49%
1982	1,070	+2.54%
1990	1,111	+0.47%
1999	1,119	+0.08%
2007	1,438	+3.18%
2012	1,467	+0.40%
2017	1,647	+2.34%
2023	1,827	+1.74%
Source: INSEE

== See also ==
- Communes of the Doubs department
