= Valleroy, Doubs =

Valleroy
- Commune
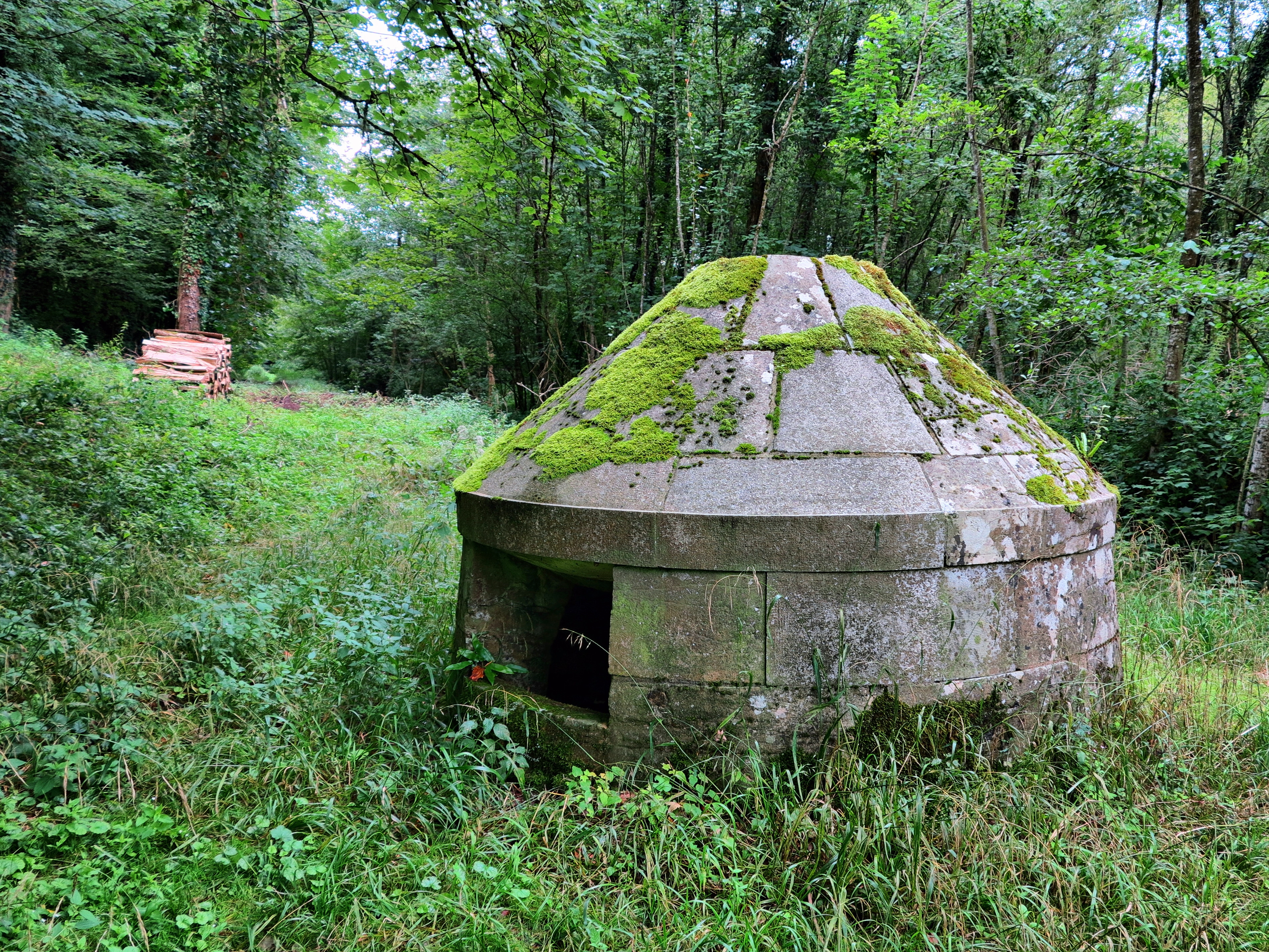
- The Rosemont spring in Valleroy

- Coat of arms
- Location of Valleroy
- Location within France Location within Bourgogne-Franche-Comté
- Coordinates: 47°23′14″N 6°07′07″E
- Country: France
- Region: Bourgogne-Franche-Comté
- Department: Doubs
- Arrondissement: Besançon
- Canton: Baume-les-Dames

Government
  - Mayor (2020–2026): Lucile Bas
- Area^{1}: 3.05 km^{2} (1.18 sq mi)
- Highest elevation: 278 m (912 ft)
- Lowest elevation: 220 m (720 ft)
- Population (2023): 148
  - Density: 48.5/km^{2} (126/sq mi)
- Time zone: UTC+01:00 (CET)
  - Summer (DST): UTC+02:00 (CEST)
- INSEE/Postal code: 25582 /25870
- ^{1} French Land Register data, which excludes lakes, ponds, glaciers > 1 km^{2} (0.386 sq mi or 247 acres) and river estuaries.

Valleroy (French pronunciation: [valʁwa]) is a commune in the Doubs département in the Bourgogne-Franche-Comté region in eastern France.

== Geography ==
Valleroy lies 10 km (6.2 mi) from Devecey.

== Population ==
Historical population
Year	Pop.	±% p.a.
1968	36	—
1975	31	−2.11%
1982	55	+8.54%
1990	75	+3.95%
1999	72	−0.45%
2007	110	+5.44%
2012	149	+6.26%
2017	156	+0.92%
2023	148	−0.87%
Source: INSEE

== See also ==
- Communes of the Doubs department
