= Venise, Doubs =

Venise
- Commune
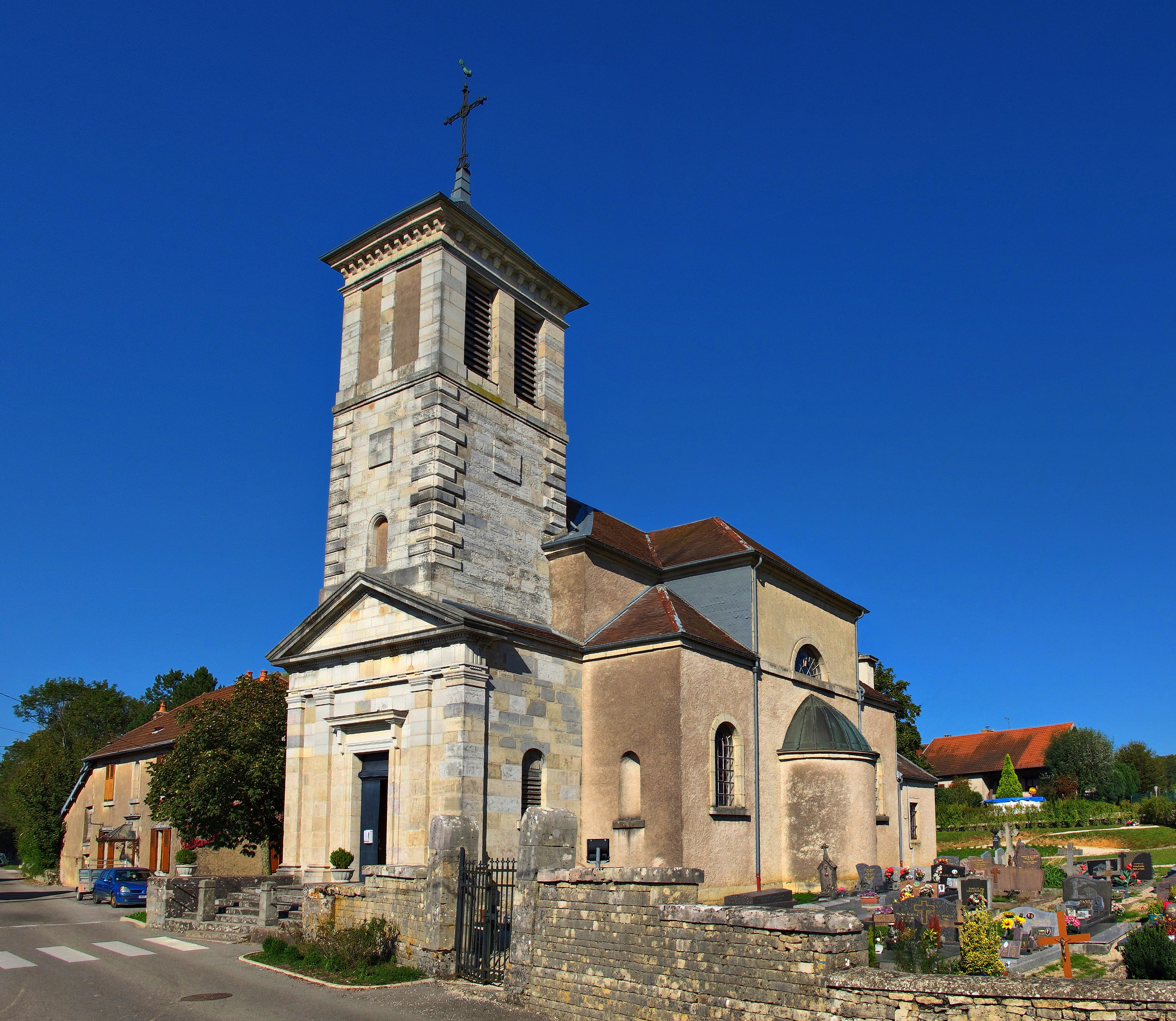
- The church in Venise

- Coat of arms
- Location of Venise
- Location within France Location within Bourgogne-Franche-Comté
- Coordinates: 47°20′51″N 6°06′31″E
- Country: France
- Region: Bourgogne-Franche-Comté
- Department: Doubs
- Arrondissement: Besançon
- Canton: Baume-les-Dames
- Intercommunality: Grand Besançon Métropole

Government
  - Mayor (2020–2026): Jean-Claude Contini
- Area^{1}: 6.18 km^{2} (2.39 sq mi)
- Highest elevation: 516 m (1,693 ft)
- Lowest elevation: 219 m (719 ft)
- Population (2023): 518
  - Density: 83.8/km^{2} (217/sq mi)
- Time zone: UTC+01:00 (CET)
  - Summer (DST): UTC+02:00 (CEST)
- INSEE/Postal code: 25598 /25870
- ^{1} French Land Register data, which excludes lakes, ponds, glaciers > 1 km^{2} (0.386 sq mi or 247 acres) and river estuaries.

Venise (French pronunciation: [vəniz]) is a commune in the Doubs department in the Bourgogne-Franche-Comté region in eastern France.

== Population ==
Historical population
Year	Pop.	±% p.a.
1968	177	—
1975	188	+0.87%
1982	235	+3.24%
1990	316	+3.77%
1999	334	+0.62%
2007	426	+3.09%
2012	500	+3.26%
2017	513	+0.51%
2023	518	+0.16%
Source: INSEE

== See also ==
- Communes of the Doubs department
