= Champoux =

- Commune
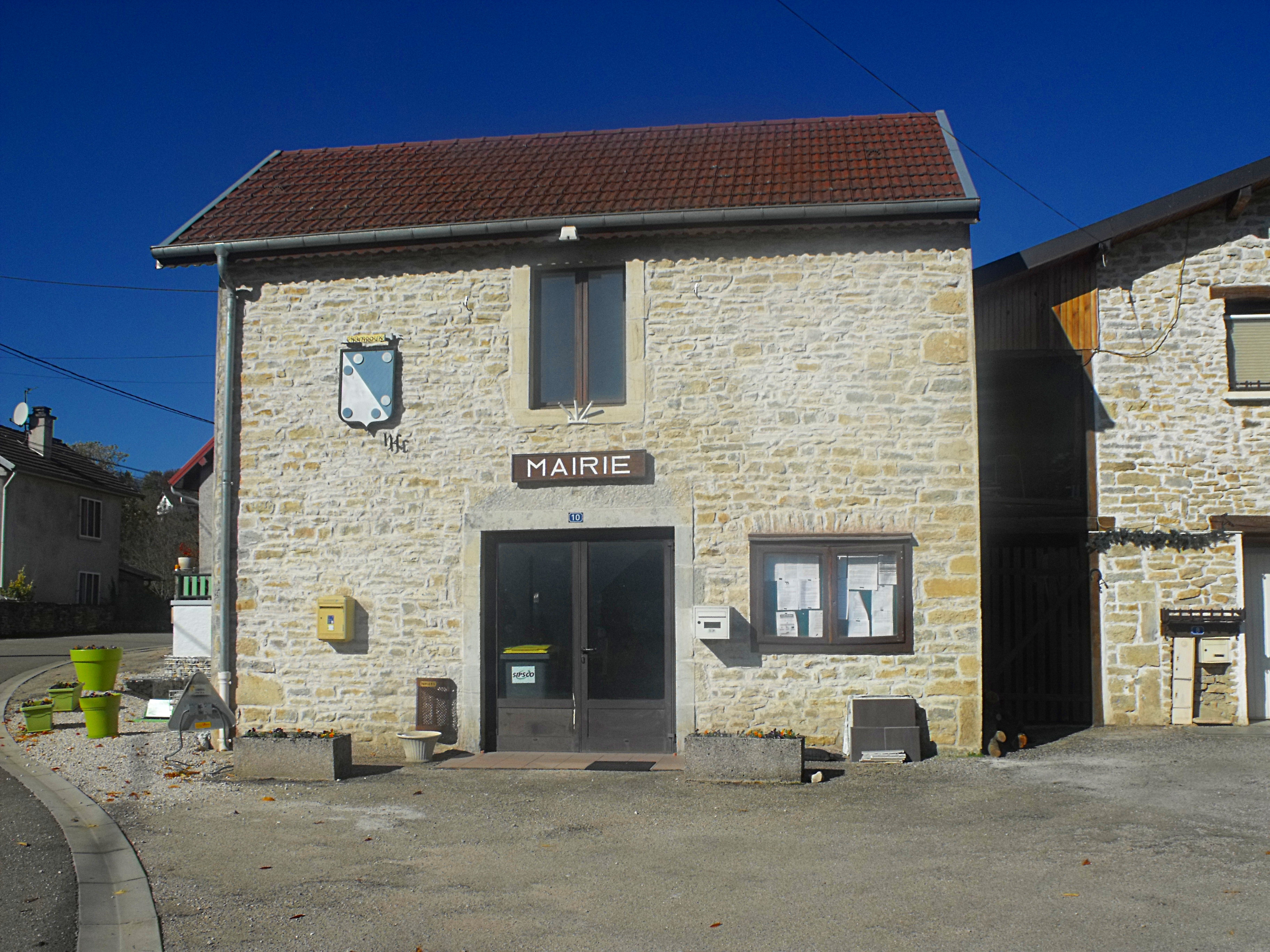
- Town Hall

- Coat of arms
- Location of Champoux
- Location within France Location within Bourgogne-Franche-Comté
- Coordinates: 47°20′07″N 6°08′15″E
- Country: France
- Region: Bourgogne-Franche-Comté
- Department: Doubs
- Arrondissement: Besançon
- Canton: Besançon-4
- Intercommunality: Grand Besançon Métropole

Government
  - Mayor (2020–2026): Romain Vienet
- Area^{1}: 2.98 km^{2} (1.15 sq mi)
- Highest elevation: 517 m (1,696 ft)
- Lowest elevation: 305 m (1,001 ft)
- Population (2023): 90
  - Density: 30/km^{2} (78/sq mi)
- Time zone: UTC+01:00 (CET)
  - Summer (DST): UTC+02:00 (CEST)
- INSEE/Postal code: 25117 /25640
- ^{1} French Land Register data, which excludes lakes, ponds, glaciers > 1 km^{2} (0.386 sq mi or 247 acres) and river estuaries.

Champoux (French pronunciation: [ʃɑ̃pu]) is a commune in the Doubs department in the Bourgogne-Franche-Comté region in eastern France.

== Population ==
Historical population
Year	Pop.	±% p.a.
1968	57	—
1975	46	−3.02%
1982	50	+1.20%
1990	54	+0.97%
1999	80	+4.46%
2007	83	+0.46%
2012	92	+2.08%
2017	91	−0.22%
2023	90	−0.18%
Source: INSEE

== See also ==
- Communes of the Doubs department
