= Vieilley =

- Commune
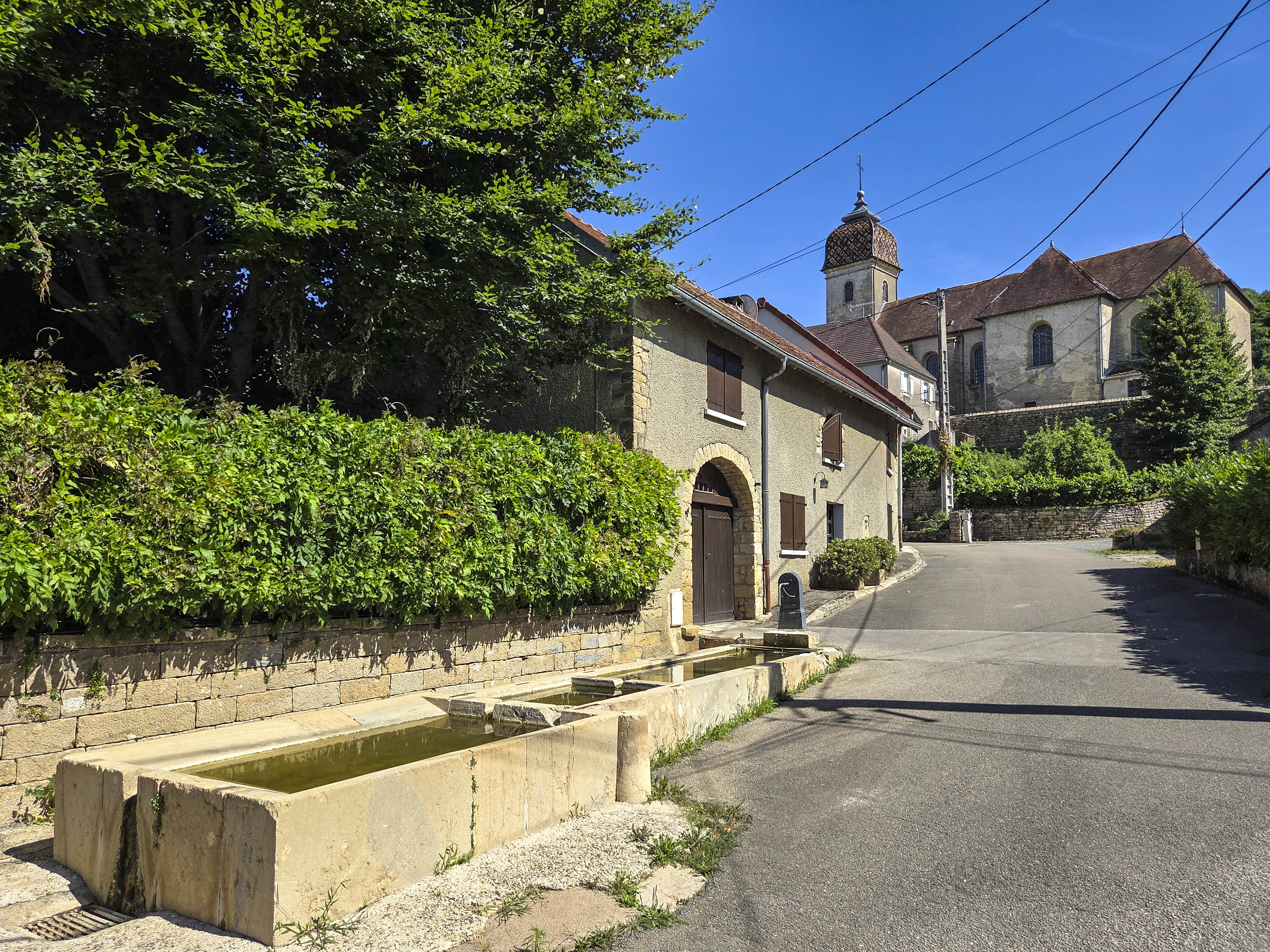
- Rue de la Cure and Saint-Léger church
- Location of Vieilley
- Location within France Location within Bourgogne-Franche-Comté
- Coordinates: 47°20′16″N 6°04′47″E
- Country: France
- Region: Bourgogne-Franche-Comté
- Department: Doubs
- Arrondissement: Besançon
- Canton: Baume-les-Dames
- Intercommunality: Grand Besançon Métropole

Government
  - Mayor (2020–2026): Franck Raclot
- Area^{1}: 9.43 km^{2} (3.64 sq mi)
- Highest elevation: 593 m (1,946 ft)
- Lowest elevation: 215 m (705 ft)
- Population (2023): 664
  - Density: 70.4/km^{2} (182/sq mi)
- Time zone: UTC+01:00 (CET)
  - Summer (DST): UTC+02:00 (CEST)
- INSEE/Postal code: 25612 /25870
- ^{1} French Land Register data, which excludes lakes, ponds, glaciers > 1 km^{2} (0.386 sq mi or 247 acres) and river estuaries.

Vieilley (French pronunciation: [vjɛjɛ]) is a commune in the Doubs department, located in the Bourgogne-Franche-Comté region of eastern France.

== Population ==
Historical population
Year	Pop.	±% p.a.
1968	246	—
1975	372	+6.09%
1982	432	+2.16%
1990	525	+2.47%
1999	587	+1.25%
2007	709	+2.39%
2012	699	−0.28%
2017	699	+0.00%
2023	664	−0.85%
Source: INSEE

== See also ==
- Communes of the Doubs department
