= Pouilley-Français =

- Commune
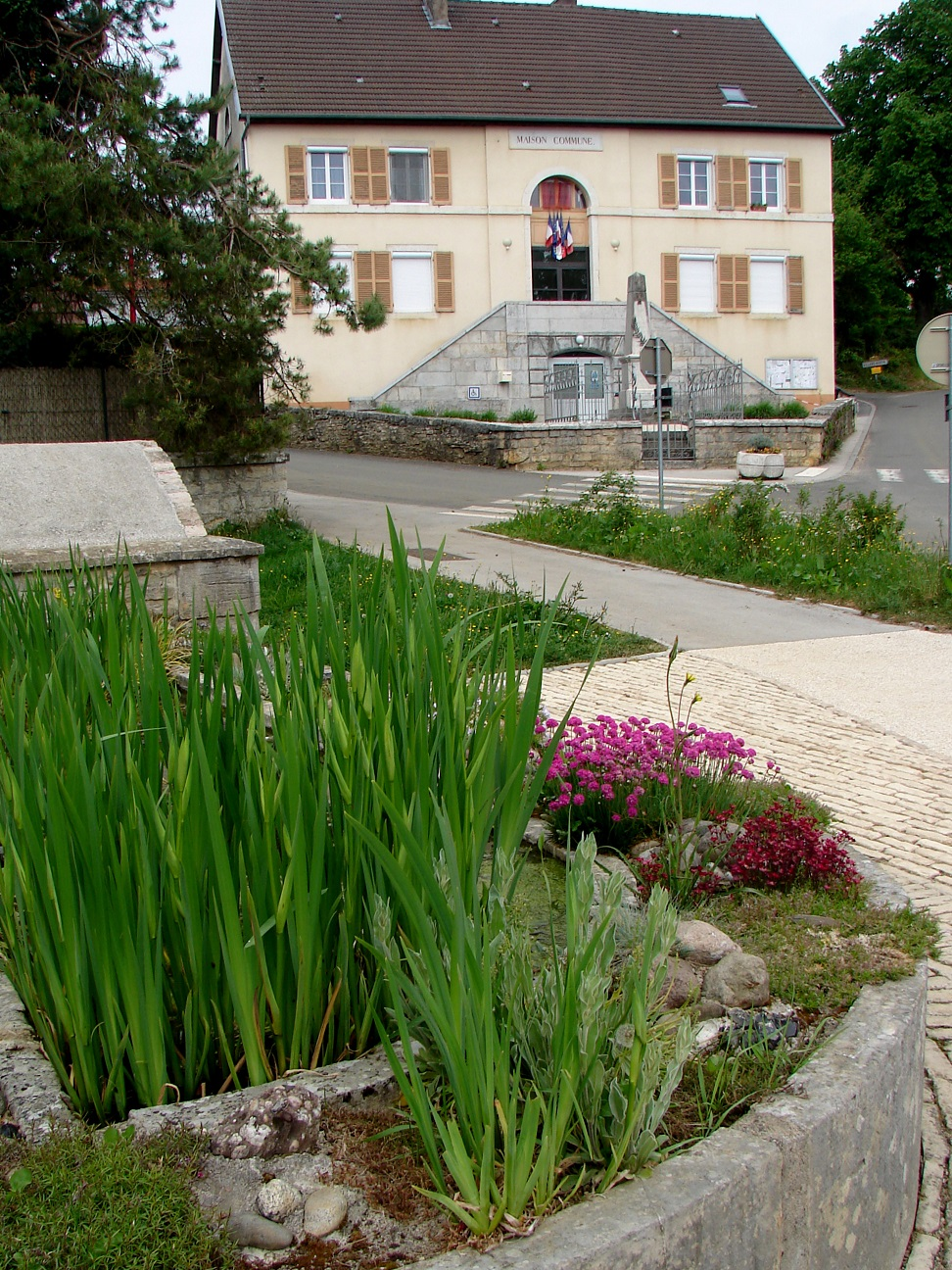
- The town hall in Pouilley-Français
- Location of Pouilley-Français
- Location within France Location within Bourgogne-Franche-Comté
- Coordinates: 47°12′29″N 5°50′43″E
- Country: France
- Region: Bourgogne-Franche-Comté
- Department: Doubs
- Arrondissement: Besançon
- Canton: Saint-Vit
- Intercommunality: Grand Besançon Métropole

Government
  - Mayor (2020–2026): Yves Maurice
- Area^{1}: 6.08 km^{2} (2.35 sq mi)
- Highest elevation: 300 m (980 ft)
- Lowest elevation: 227 m (745 ft)
- Population (2023): 816
  - Density: 134/km^{2} (348/sq mi)
- Time zone: UTC+01:00 (CET)
  - Summer (DST): UTC+02:00 (CEST)
- INSEE/Postal code: 25466 /25410
- ^{1} French Land Register data, which excludes lakes, ponds, glaciers > 1 km^{2} (0.386 sq mi or 247 acres) and river estuaries.

Pouilley-Français (French pronunciation: [pujɛ fʁɑ̃sɛ]) is a commune in the Doubs department in the Bourgogne-Franche-Comté region in eastern France. This village is close to the Jura and Haute-Saône departments.

== Geography ==
The commune lies 7 km (4.3 mi) southwest of Besançon.

== Population ==
Historical population
Year	Pop.	±% p.a.
1968	167	—
1975	260	+6.53%
1982	380	+5.57%
1990	463	+2.50%
1999	591	+2.75%
2007	653	+1.25%
2012	835	+5.04%
2017	833	−0.05%
2023	816	−0.34%
Source: INSEE

== Transportation ==
The railroad line from Besançon to Dole and the A36 motorway cross the territory of the commune.

== See also ==
- Communes of the Doubs department
