= Miserey-Salines =

- Commune
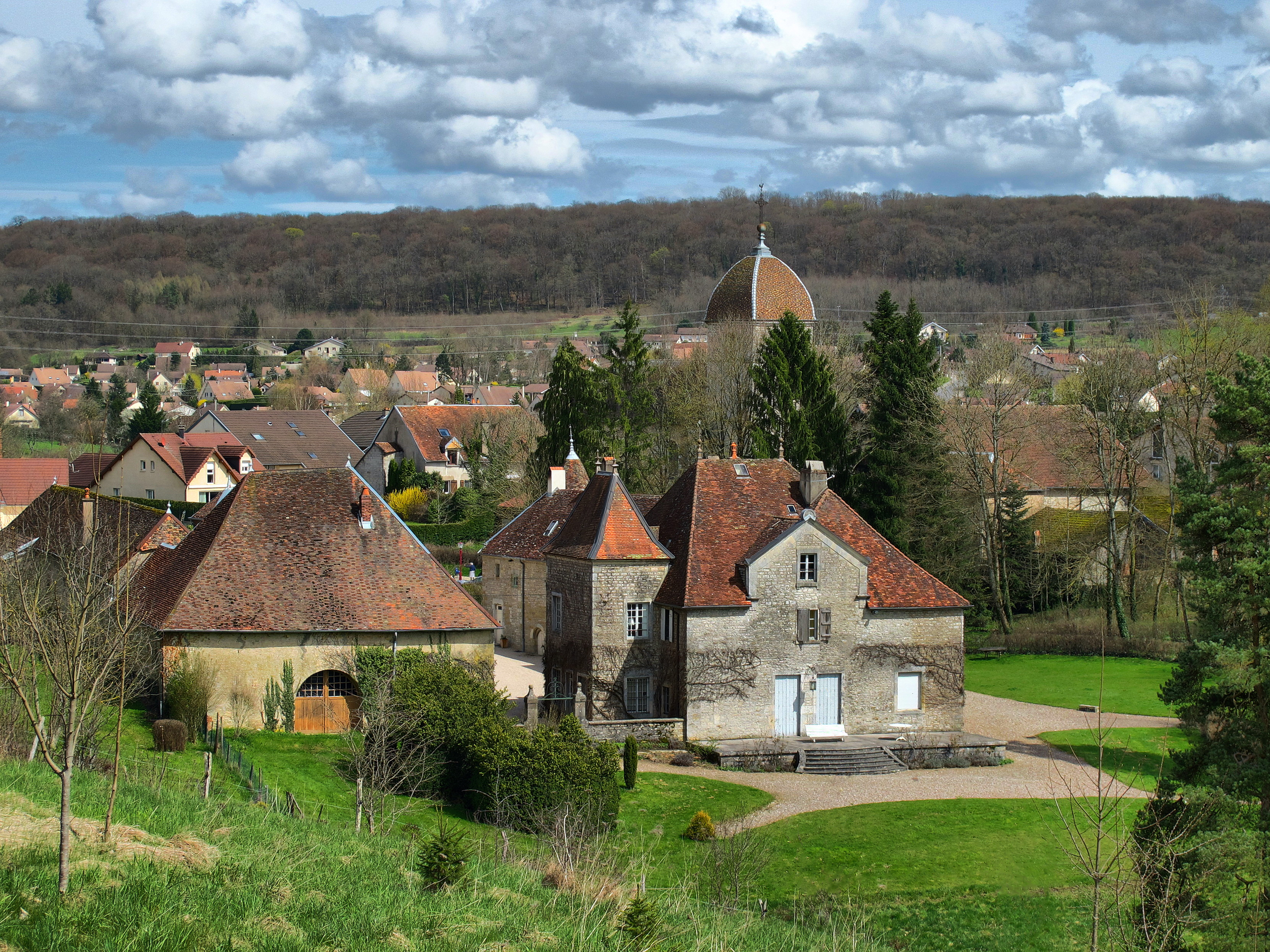
- The chateau in Miserey-Salines

- Coat of arms
- Location of Miserey-Salines
- Location within France Location within Bourgogne-Franche-Comté
- Coordinates: 47°17′14″N 5°58′28″E
- Country: France
- Region: Bourgogne-Franche-Comté
- Department: Doubs
- Arrondissement: Besançon
- Canton: Besançon-3
- Intercommunality: Grand Besançon Métropole

Government
  - Mayor (2020–2026): Marcel Felt
- Area^{1}: 6.22 km^{2} (2.40 sq mi)
- Highest elevation: 385 m (1,263 ft)
- Lowest elevation: 268 m (879 ft)
- Population (2023): 2,661
  - Density: 428/km^{2} (1,110/sq mi)
- Time zone: UTC+01:00 (CET)
  - Summer (DST): UTC+02:00 (CEST)
- INSEE/Postal code: 25381 /25480
- ^{1} French Land Register data, which excludes lakes, ponds, glaciers > 1 km^{2} (0.386 sq mi or 247 acres) and river estuaries.

Miserey-Salines (French pronunciation: [mizʁɛ salin]) is a commune in the Doubs department in the Bourgogne-Franche-Comté region in eastern France.

== Geography ==
The commune lies 7 km (4.3 mi) north of Besançon.

== Population ==
Historical population
Year	Pop.	±% p.a.
1968	448	—
1975	957	+11.45%
1982	1,326	+4.77%
1990	2,096	+5.89%
1999	2,157	+0.32%
2007	2,109	−0.28%
2012	2,196	+0.81%
2017	2,502	+2.64%
2023	2,661	+1.03%
Source: INSEE

== See also ==
- Communes of the Doubs department
