= Châtillon-le-Duc =

- Commune
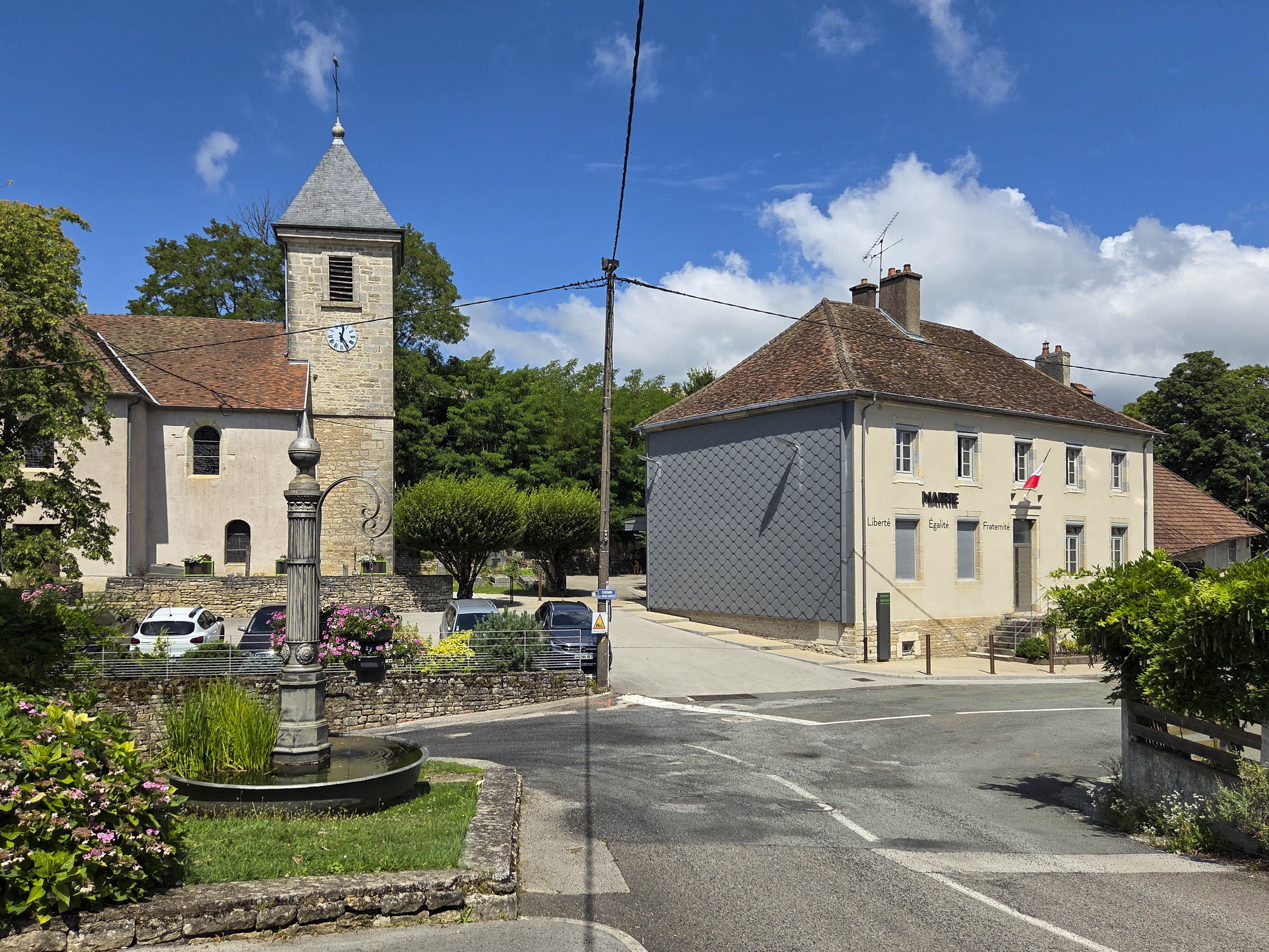
- The fountain, the church and the townhall of Châtillon-le-Duc
- Location of Châtillon-le-Duc
- Location within France Location within Bourgogne-Franche-Comté
- Coordinates: 47°18′17″N 6°00′28″E
- Country: France
- Region: Bourgogne-Franche-Comté
- Department: Doubs
- Arrondissement: Besançon
- Canton: Besançon-3
- Intercommunality: Grand Besançon Métropole

Government
  - Mayor (2024–2026): Martial Devaux
- Area^{1}: 6.26 km^{2} (2.42 sq mi)
- Highest elevation: 482 m (1,581 ft)
- Lowest elevation: 212 m (696 ft)
- Population (2023): 2,042
  - Density: 326/km^{2} (845/sq mi)
- Time zone: UTC+01:00 (CET)
  - Summer (DST): UTC+02:00 (CEST)
- INSEE/Postal code: 25133 /25870
- ^{1} French Land Register data, which excludes lakes, ponds, glaciers > 1 km^{2} (0.386 sq mi or 247 acres) and river estuaries.

Châtillon-le-Duc (French pronunciation: [ʃatijɔ̃ lə dyk]) is a commune in the Doubs department in the Bourgogne-Franche-Comté region in eastern France.

== Population ==
Historical population
Year	Pop.	±% p.a.
1968	557	—
1975	996	+8.66%
1982	1,334	+4.26%
1990	1,568	+2.04%
1999	1,834	+1.76%
2007	1,987	+1.01%
2012	1,876	−1.14%
2017	2,054	+1.83%
2023	2,042	−0.10%
Source: INSEE

== See also ==
- Communes of the Doubs department
