= Chemaudin et Vaux =

- Commune
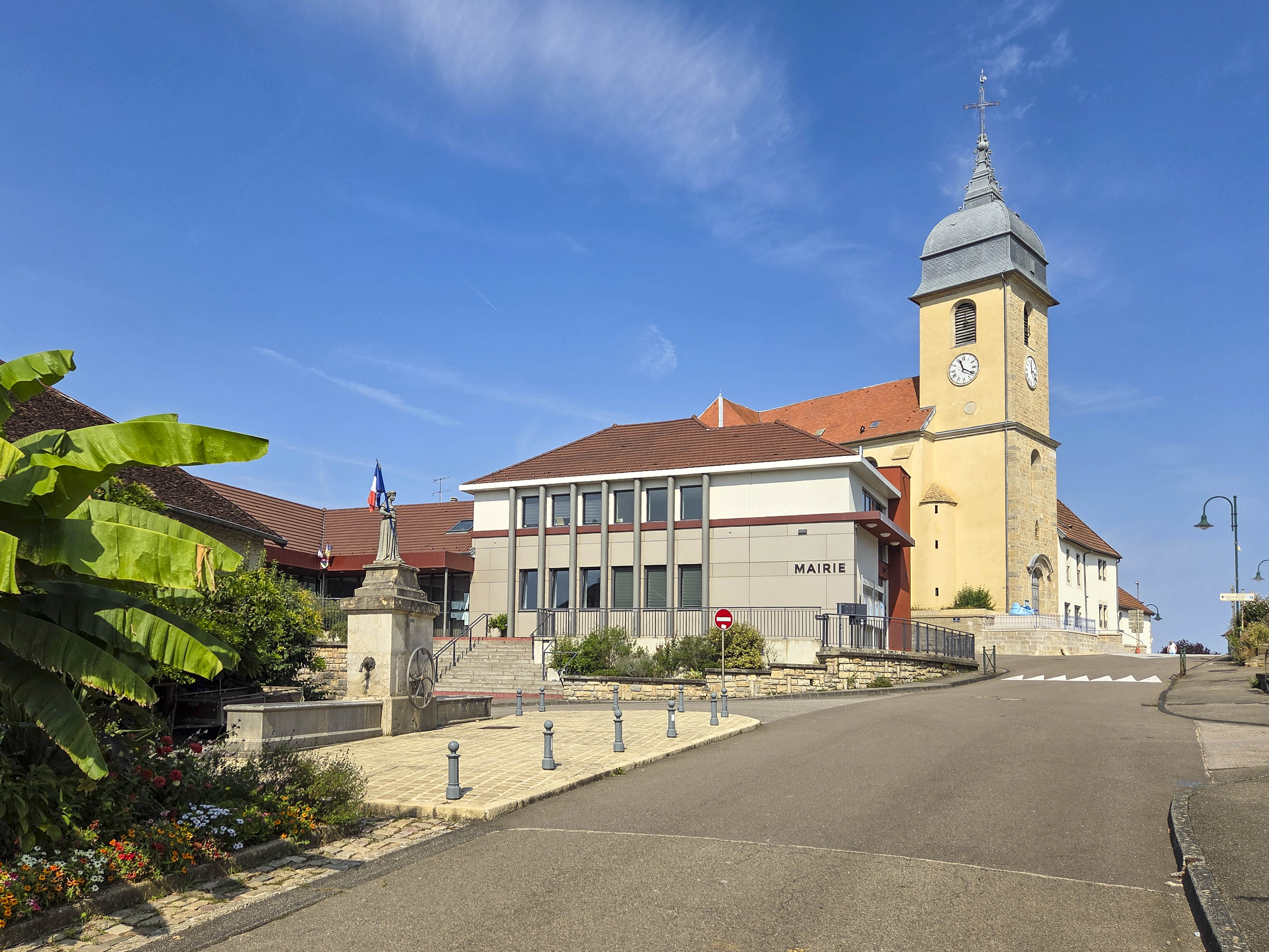
- The centre of the village of Chemaudin.
- Location of Chemaudin et Vaux
- Location within France Location within Bourgogne-Franche-Comté
- Coordinates: 47°13′30″N 5°53′35″E
- Country: France
- Region: Bourgogne-Franche-Comté
- Department: Doubs
- Arrondissement: Besançon
- Canton: Besançon-1
- Intercommunality: Grand Besançon Métropole

Government
  - Mayor (2020–2026): Gilbert Gavignet
- Area^{1}: 12.44 km^{2} (4.80 sq mi)
- Population (2023): 2,113
  - Density: 169.9/km^{2} (439.9/sq mi)
- Time zone: UTC+01:00 (CET)
  - Summer (DST): UTC+02:00 (CEST)
- INSEE/Postal code: 25147 /25320
- ^{1} French Land Register data, which excludes lakes, ponds, glaciers > 1 km^{2} (0.386 sq mi or 247 acres) and river estuaries.

Chemaudin et Vaux (French pronunciation: [ʃəmodɛ̃ e vo]) is a commune in the department of Doubs, eastern France. The municipality was established on 1 January 2017 by merger of the former communes of Chemaudin (the seat) and Vaux-les-Prés.

== Population ==
Population data refer to the commune in its geography as of January 2025.

Historical population
Year	Pop.	±% p.a.
1968	623	—
1975	783	+3.32%
1982	925	+2.41%
1990	1,192	+3.22%
1999	1,567	+3.09%
2007	1,807	+1.80%
2012	1,850	+0.47%
2017	1,937	+0.92%
2023	2,113	+1.46%
Source: INSEE

== See also ==
- Communes of the Doubs department
