= Roset-Fluans =

- Commune
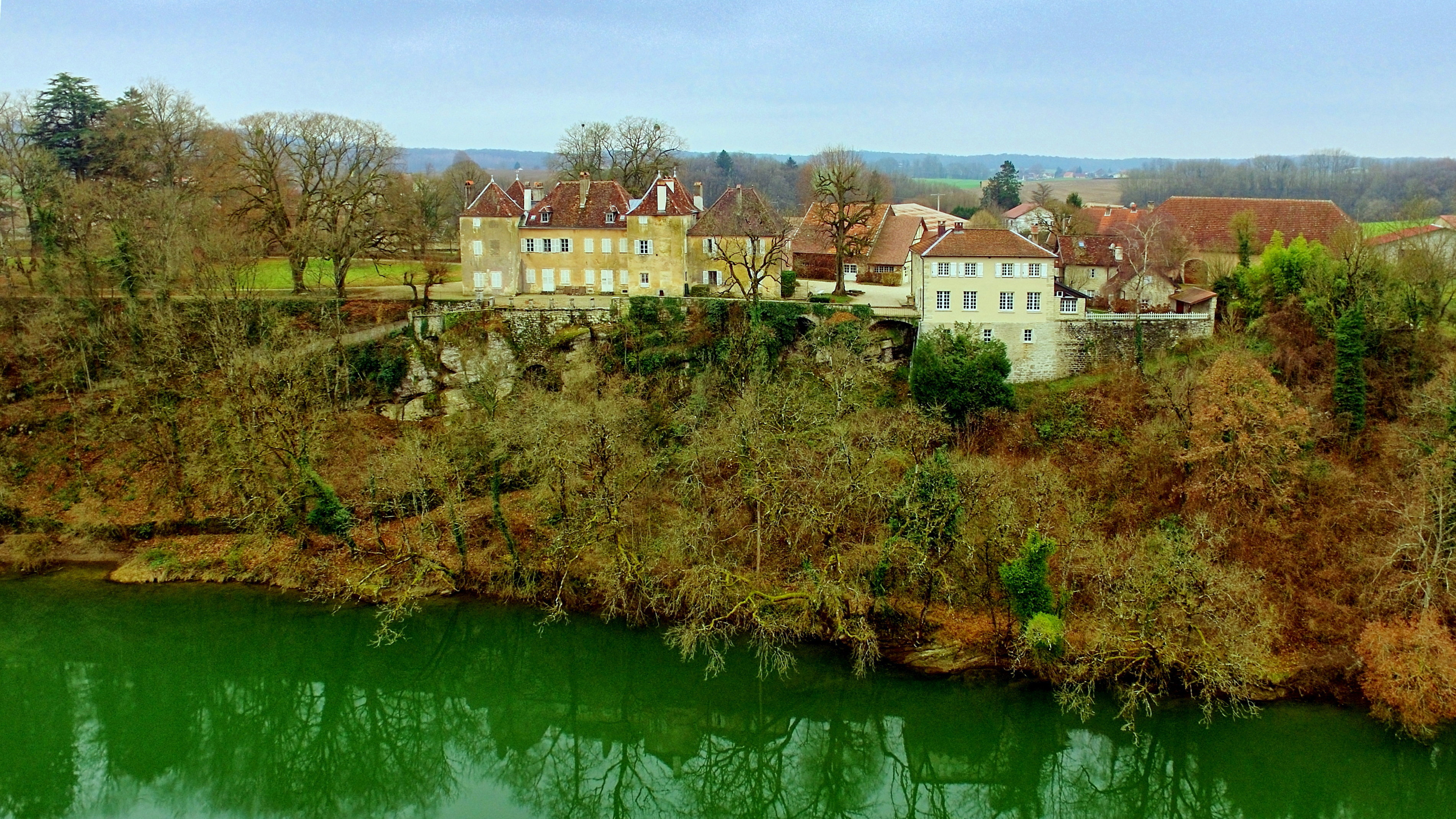
- The chateau on the bank of the Doubs river, in Roset-Fluans
- Location of Roset-Fluans
- Location within France Location within Bourgogne-Franche-Comté
- Coordinates: 47°09′51″N 5°49′35″E
- Country: France
- Region: Bourgogne-Franche-Comté
- Department: Doubs
- Arrondissement: Besançon
- Canton: Saint-Vit
- Intercommunality: Grand Besançon Métropole

Government
  - Mayor (2020–2026): Jacques Adriansen
- Area^{1}: 8.28 km^{2} (3.20 sq mi)
- Highest elevation: 357 m (1,171 ft)
- Lowest elevation: 214 m (702 ft)
- Population (2023): 599
  - Density: 72.3/km^{2} (187/sq mi)
- Time zone: UTC+01:00 (CET)
  - Summer (DST): UTC+02:00 (CEST)
- INSEE/Postal code: 25502 /25410
- ^{1} French Land Register data, which excludes lakes, ponds, glaciers > 1 km^{2} (0.386 sq mi or 247 acres) and river estuaries.

Roset-Fluans is a commune in the Doubs department in the Bourgogne-Franche-Comté region in eastern France.

== Geography ==
The commune lies 8 km (5.0 mi) northwest of Boussières. The Osselle cave is one of the oldest known caves in Franche-Comté. It was a refuge for priests during the French Revolution.

== History ==
The commune was formed by merging four communes: Roset, Fluans, La Corne-de-Chaux, and Château-le-Bois. It also includes two villages: La Froidière and La Veloupe.

Château-le-Bois had 132 inhabitants in 1803, but is now completely covered by forest.

== Population ==
Historical population
Year	Pop.	±% p.a.
1968	238	—
1975	246	+0.47%
1982	266	+1.12%
1990	296	+1.34%
1999	374	+2.63%
2007	441	+2.08%
2012	475	+1.50%
2017	520	+1.83%
2023	599	+2.39%
Source: INSEE

== See also ==
- Communes of the Doubs department
