= Mérey-Vieilley =

- Commune
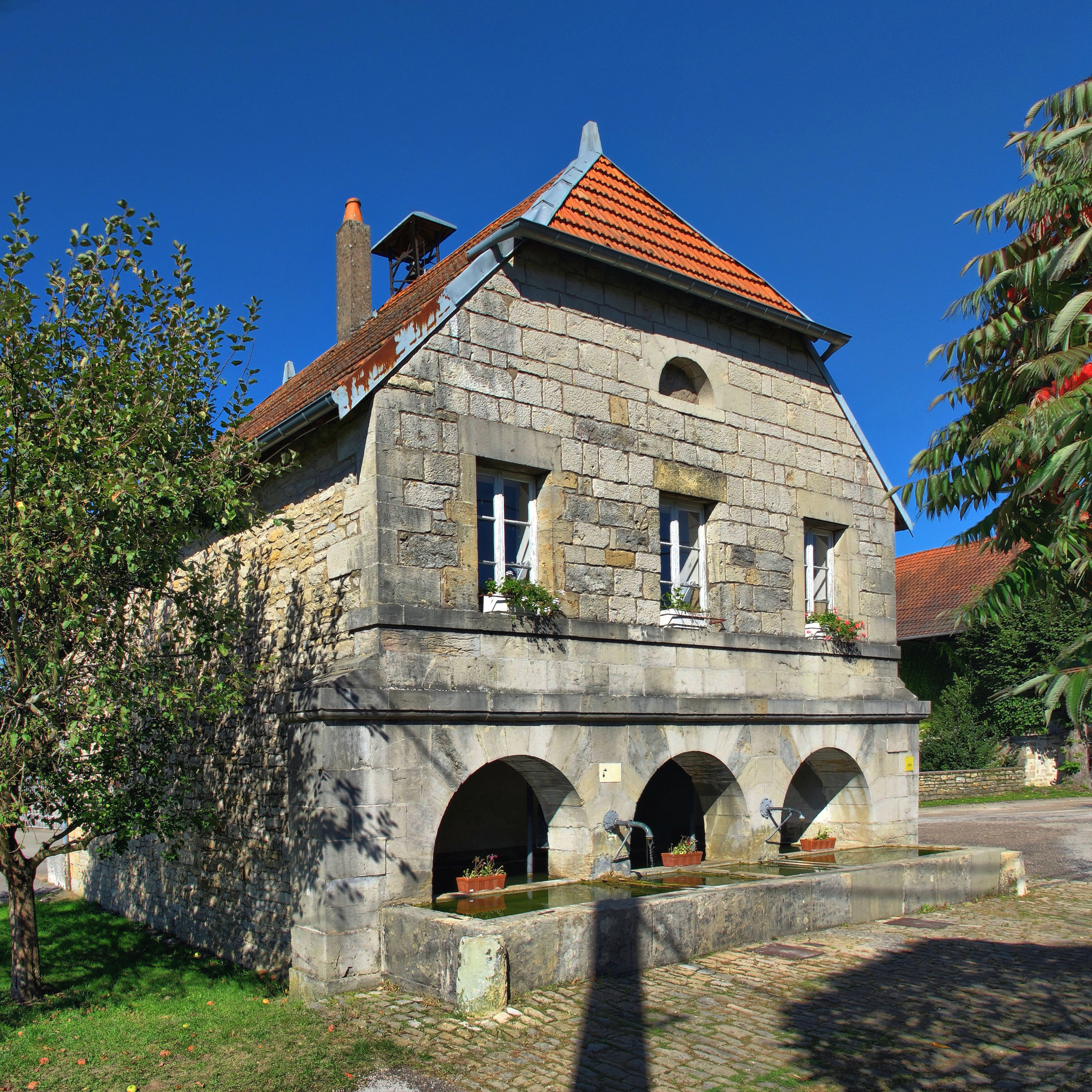
- The town hall in Mérey-Vieilley
- Location of Mérey-Vieilley
- Location within France Location within Bourgogne-Franche-Comté
- Coordinates: 47°20′01″N 6°03′48″E
- Country: France
- Region: Bourgogne-Franche-Comté
- Department: Doubs
- Arrondissement: Besançon
- Canton: Baume-les-Dames
- Intercommunality: Grand Besançon Métropole

Government
  - Mayor (2020–2026): Philippe Pernot
- Area^{1}: 3.42 km^{2} (1.32 sq mi)
- Highest elevation: 600 m (2,000 ft)
- Lowest elevation: 216 m (709 ft)
- Population (2023): 178
  - Density: 52.0/km^{2} (135/sq mi)
- Time zone: UTC+01:00 (CET)
  - Summer (DST): UTC+02:00 (CEST)
- INSEE/Postal code: 25376 /25870
- ^{1} French Land Register data, which excludes lakes, ponds, glaciers > 1 km^{2} (0.386 sq mi or 247 acres) and river estuaries.

Mérey-Vieilley (French pronunciation: [meʁɛ vjɛjɛ]) is a commune in the Doubs department in the Bourgogne-Franche-Comté region in eastern France.

== Geography ==
The commune lies 9 km (5.6 mi) west of Marchaux.

== Population ==
Historical population
Year	Pop.	±% p.a.
1968	50	—
1975	50	+0.00%
1982	71	+5.14%
1990	81	+1.66%
1999	100	+2.37%
2007	100	+0.00%
2012	118	+3.37%
2017	147	+4.49%
2023	178	+3.24%
Source: INSEE

== See also ==
- Communes of the Doubs department
