= Geneuille =

- Commune
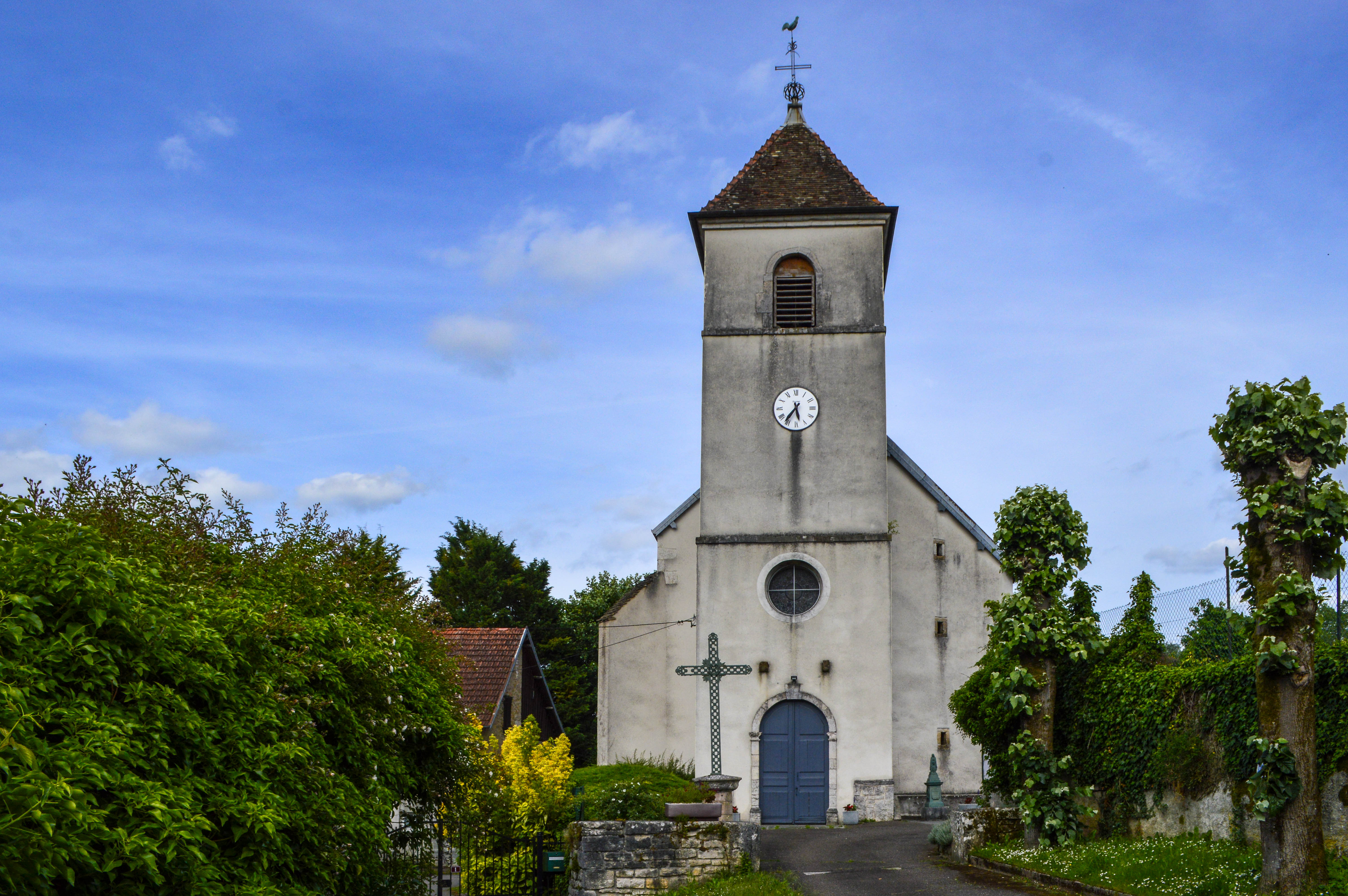
- The church in Geneuille

- Coat of arms
- Location of Geneuille
- Location within France Location within Bourgogne-Franche-Comté
- Coordinates: 47°19′28″N 5°58′17″E
- Country: France
- Region: Bourgogne-Franche-Comté
- Department: Doubs
- Arrondissement: Besançon
- Canton: Baume-les-Dames
- Intercommunality: Grand Besançon Métropole

Government
  - Mayor (2020–2026): Patrick Oudot
- Area^{1}: 6.45 km^{2} (2.49 sq mi)
- Highest elevation: 278 m (912 ft)
- Lowest elevation: 210 m (690 ft)
- Population (2023): 1,280
  - Density: 198/km^{2} (514/sq mi)
- Time zone: UTC+01:00 (CET)
  - Summer (DST): UTC+02:00 (CEST)
- INSEE/Postal code: 25265 /25870
- ^{1} French Land Register data, which excludes lakes, ponds, glaciers > 1 km^{2} (0.386 sq mi or 247 acres) and river estuaries.

Geneuille (French pronunciation: [ʒənœj]) is a commune in the Doubs department in the Bourgogne-Franche-Comté region in eastern France.

== Population ==
Historical population
Year	Pop.	±% p.a.
1968	401	—
1975	526	+3.95%
1982	655	+3.18%
1990	768	+2.01%
1999	890	+1.65%
2007	1,274	+4.59%
2012	1,363	+1.36%
2017	1,331	−0.47%
2023	1,280	−0.65%
Source: INSEE

== See also ==
- Communes of the Doubs department
