= Chalèze =

- Commune
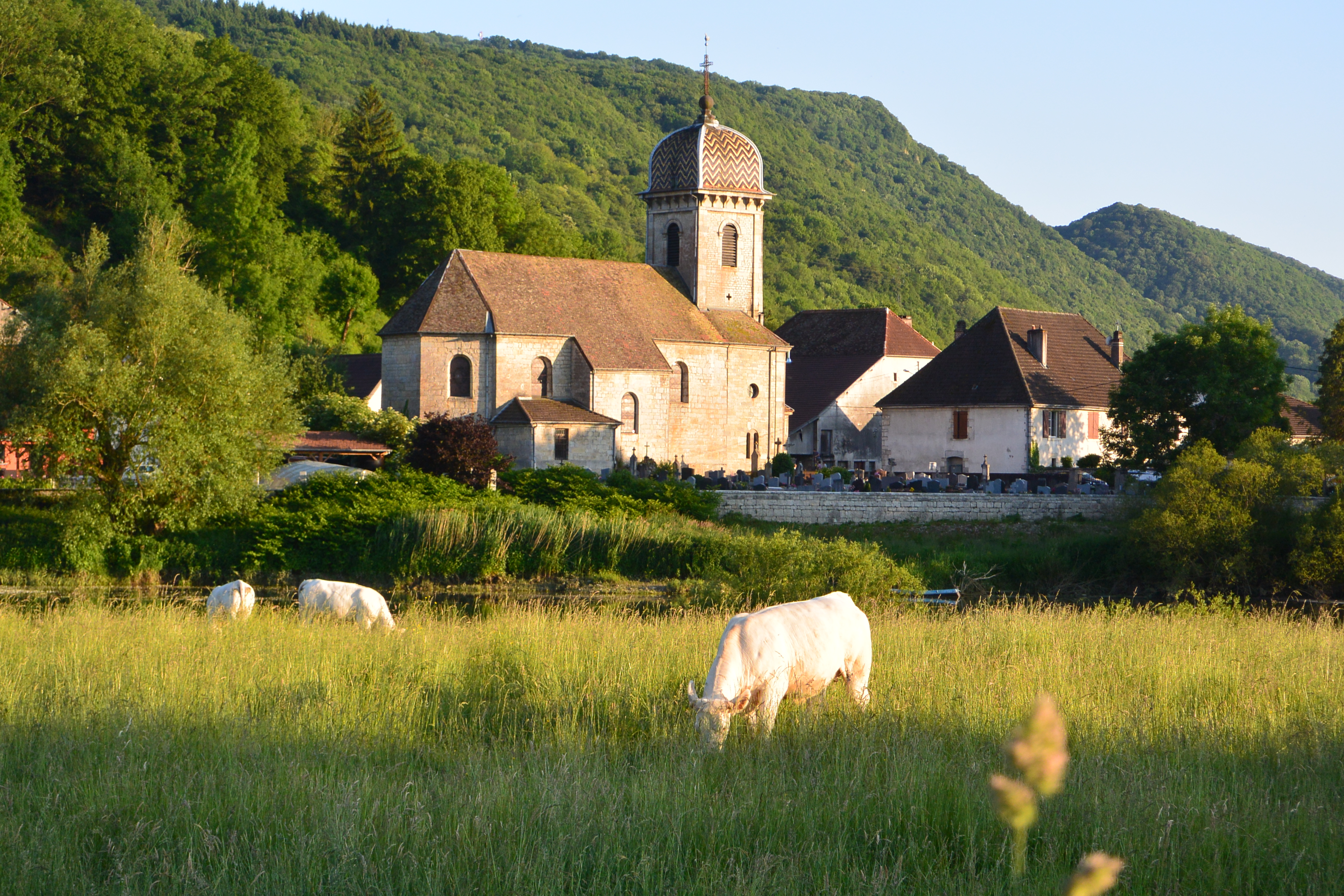
- View of Chalèze
- Location of Chalèze
- Location within France Location within Bourgogne-Franche-Comté
- Coordinates: 47°16′04″N 6°05′22″E
- Country: France
- Region: Bourgogne-Franche-Comté
- Department: Doubs
- Arrondissement: Besançon
- Canton: Besançon-4
- Intercommunality: Grand Besançon Métropole

Government
  - Mayor (2020–2026): René Blaison
- Area^{1}: 5.68 km^{2} (2.19 sq mi)
- Highest elevation: 552 m (1,811 ft)
- Lowest elevation: 240 m (790 ft)
- Population (2023): 366
  - Density: 64.4/km^{2} (167/sq mi)
- Time zone: UTC+01:00 (CET)
  - Summer (DST): UTC+02:00 (CEST)
- INSEE/Postal code: 25111 /25220
- ^{1} French Land Register data, which excludes lakes, ponds, glaciers > 1 km^{2} (0.386 sq mi or 247 acres) and river estuaries.

Chalèze (French pronunciation: [ʃalɛz]) is a commune in the Doubs department in the Bourgogne-Franche-Comté region in eastern France.

== Population ==
Historical population
Year	Pop.	±% p.a.
1968	237	—
1975	323	+4.52%
1982	383	+2.46%
1990	379	−0.13%
1999	367	−0.36%
2007	382	+0.50%
2012	356	−1.40%
2017	370	+0.77%
2023	366	−0.18%
Source: INSEE

== See also ==
- Communes of the Doubs department
