= Thise =

- Commune
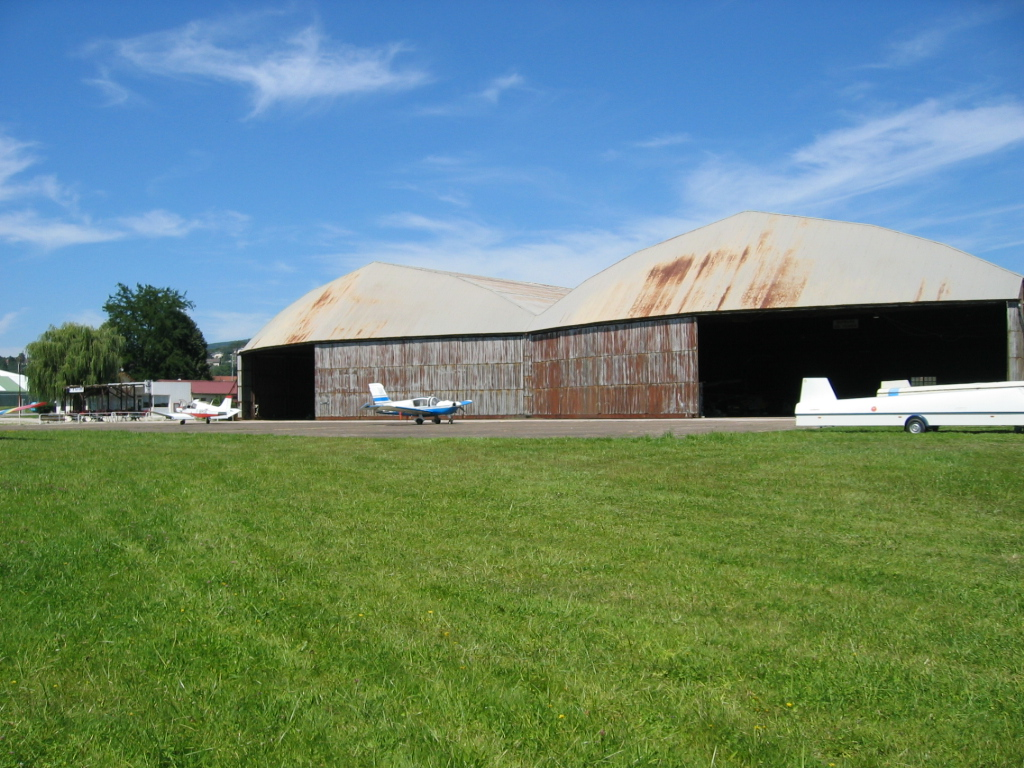
- The Besançon-Thise Aerodrome in Thise

- Coat of arms
- Location of Thise
- Location within France Location within Bourgogne-Franche-Comté
- Coordinates: 47°17′00″N 6°05′00″E
- Country: France
- Region: Bourgogne-Franche-Comté
- Department: Doubs
- Arrondissement: Besançon
- Canton: Besançon-4
- Intercommunality: Grand Besançon Métropole

Government
  - Mayor (2022–2026): Pascal Dériot
- Area^{1}: 8.93 km^{2} (3.45 sq mi)
- Highest elevation: 422 m (1,385 ft)
- Lowest elevation: 244 m (801 ft)
- Population (2023): 2,994
  - Density: 335/km^{2} (868/sq mi)
- Time zone: UTC+01:00 (CET)
  - Summer (DST): UTC+02:00 (CEST)
- INSEE/Postal code: 25560 /25220
- ^{1} French Land Register data, which excludes lakes, ponds, glaciers > 1 km^{2} (0.386 sq mi or 247 acres) and river estuaries.

Thise (French pronunciation: [tiz]) is a commune in the Doubs department in the Bourgogne-Franche-Comté region in eastern France.

== Geography ==
Thise lies 9 km (5.6 mi) southwest of Marchaux.

== Population ==
Historical population
Year	Pop.	±% p.a.
1968	1,000	—
1975	1,615	+7.09%
1982	2,554	+6.77%
1990	2,856	+1.41%
1999	3,036	+0.68%
2007	3,202	+0.67%
2012	3,157	−0.28%
2017	3,044	−0.73%
2023	2,994	−0.28%
Source: INSEE

== See also ==
- Communes of the Doubs department
