= Devecey =

- Commune
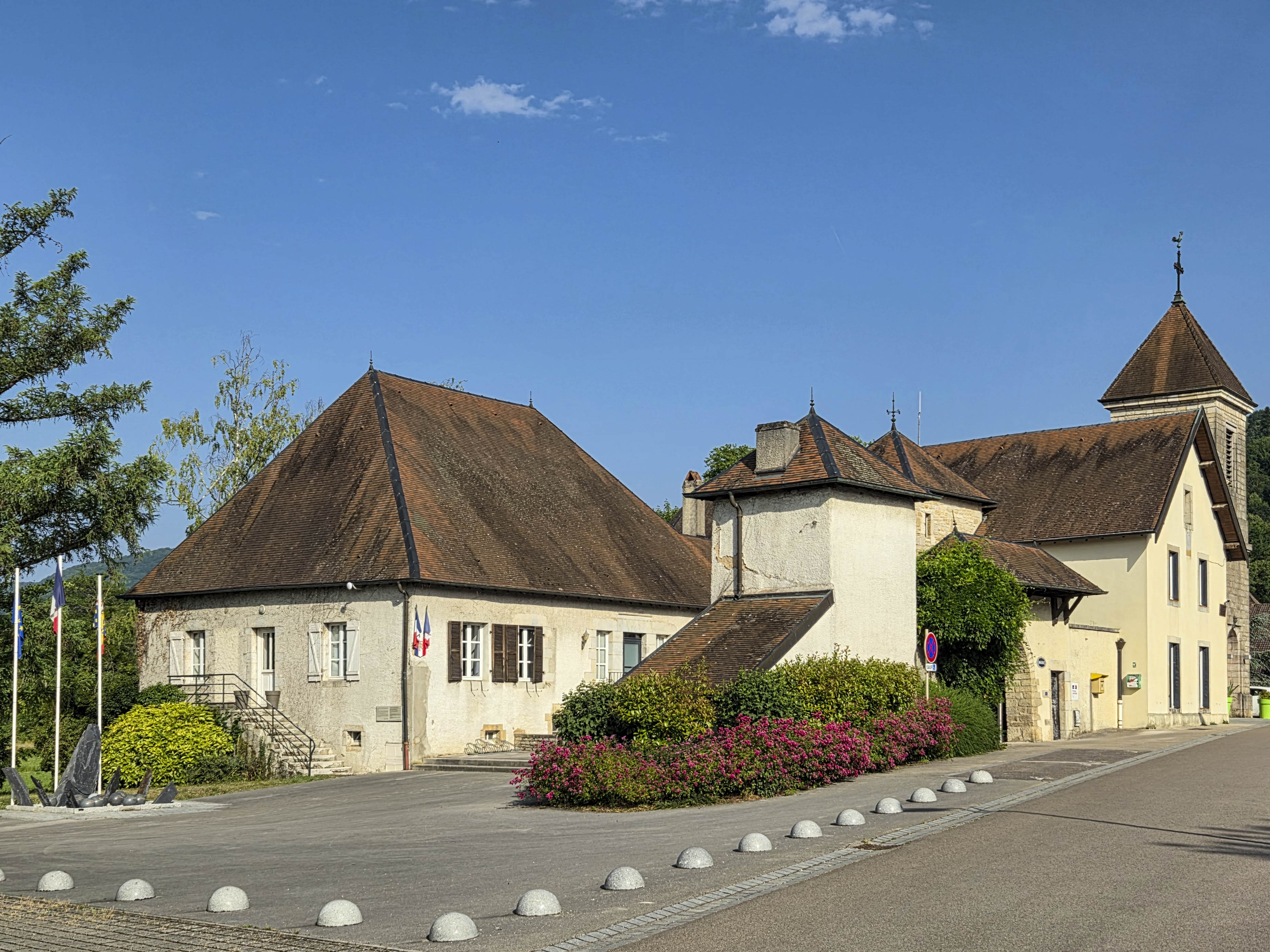
- The village centre

- Coat of arms
- Location of Devecey
- Location within France Location within Bourgogne-Franche-Comté
- Coordinates: 47°19′31″N 6°00′54″E
- Country: France
- Region: Bourgogne-Franche-Comté
- Department: Doubs
- Arrondissement: Besançon
- Canton: Baume-les-Dames
- Intercommunality: Grand Besançon Métropole

Government
  - Mayor (2023–2026): Gerard Monnien
- Area^{1}: 3.78 km^{2} (1.46 sq mi)
- Elevation: 236 m (774 ft)
- Highest elevation: 482 m (1,581 ft)
- Lowest elevation: 211 m (692 ft)
- Population (2023): 1,296
  - Density: 343/km^{2} (888/sq mi)
- Time zone: UTC+01:00 (CET)
  - Summer (DST): UTC+02:00 (CEST)
- INSEE/Postal code: 25200 /25870
- ^{1} French Land Register data, which excludes lakes, ponds, glaciers > 1 km^{2} (0.386 sq mi or 247 acres) and river estuaries.

Devecey (French pronunciation: [dəvsɛ]) is a commune in the Doubs department in the Bourgogne-Franche-Comté region in eastern France.

== Population ==
Historical population
Year	Pop.	±% p.a.
1968	444	—
1975	702	+6.76%
1982	955	+4.49%
1990	1,401	+4.91%
1999	1,423	+0.17%
2007	1,428	+0.04%
2012	1,348	−1.15%
2017	1,451	+1.48%
2023	1,296	−1.87%
Source: INSEE

== See also ==
- Communes of the Doubs department
