= Échevannes =

Échevannes may refer to the following places in France:

- Échevannes, Côte-d'Or, a commune in the department of Côte-d'Or
- Échevannes, Doubs, a commune in the department of Doubs
