= Saint-Gorgon-Main =

- Commune
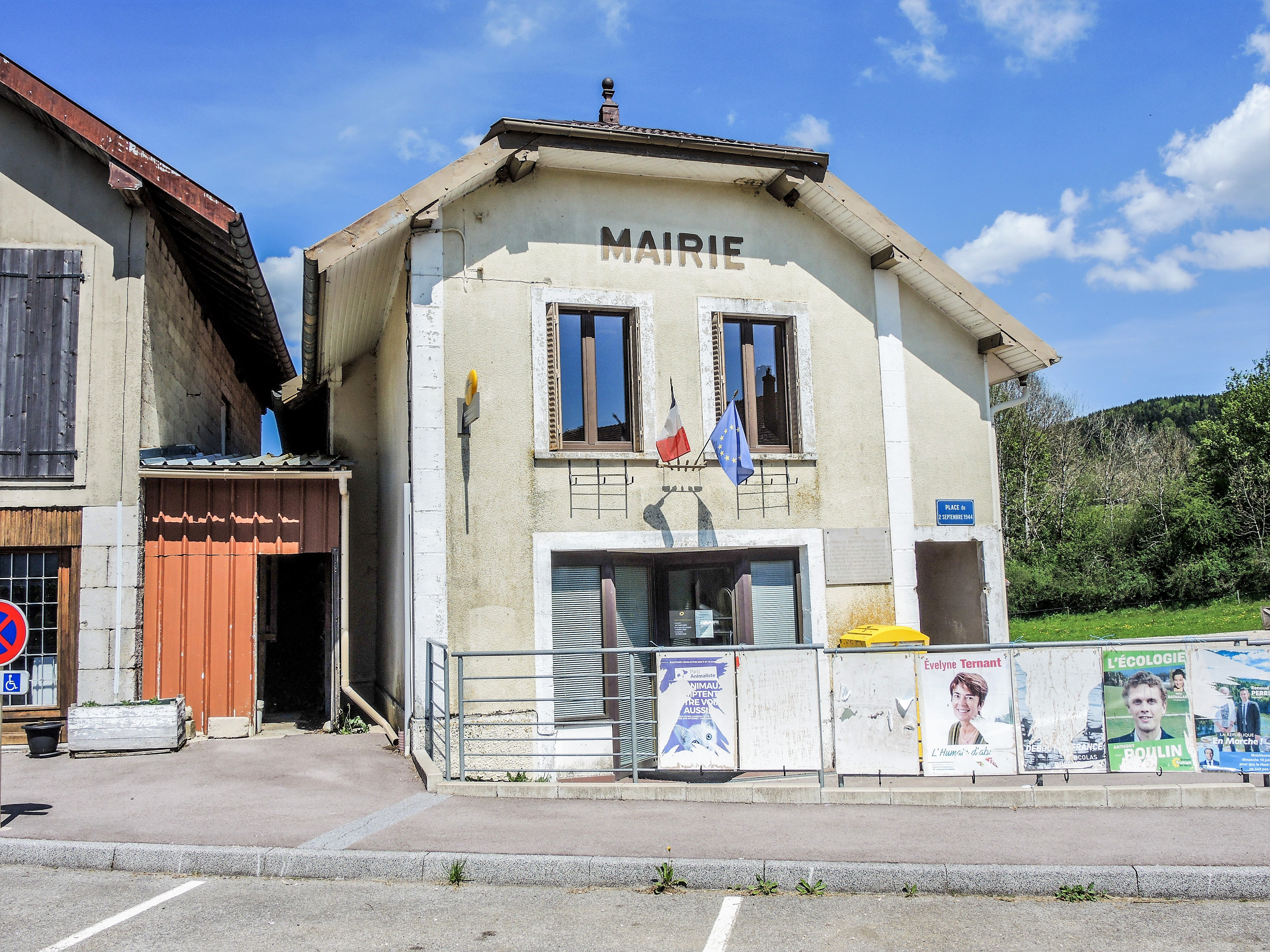
- The town hall in Saint-Gorgon-Main
- Location of Saint-Gorgon-Main
- Location within France Location within Bourgogne-Franche-Comté
- Coordinates: 47°01′25″N 6°19′27″E
- Country: France
- Region: Bourgogne-Franche-Comté
- Department: Doubs
- Arrondissement: Pontarlier
- Canton: Ornans
- Intercommunality: CC entre Doubs et Loue

Government
  - Mayor (2020–2026): Jean-Luc Felder
- Area^{1}: 7.93 km^{2} (3.06 sq mi)
- Elevation: 692 m (2,270 ft)
- Highest elevation: 1,050 m (3,440 ft)
- Lowest elevation: 650 m (2,130 ft)
- Population (2023): 250
  - Density: 32/km^{2} (82/sq mi)
- Time zone: UTC+01:00 (CET)
  - Summer (DST): UTC+02:00 (CEST)
- INSEE/Postal code: 25517 /25520
- ^{1} French Land Register data, which excludes lakes, ponds, glaciers > 1 km^{2} (0.386 sq mi or 247 acres) and river estuaries.

Saint-Gorgon-Main (French pronunciation: [sɛ̃ ɡɔʁɡɔ̃ mɛ̃]) is a commune in the Doubs department in the Bourgogne-Franche-Comté region in eastern France.

== Geography ==
The commune lies 14 km (8.7 mi) from Pontarlier on the national highway 57 from Besançon to Pontarlier.

== Population ==
Historical population
Year	Pop.	±% p.a.
1968	146	—
1975	160	+1.32%
1982	163	+0.27%
1990	188	+1.80%
1999	195	+0.41%
2007	251	+3.21%
2012	281	+2.28%
2017	283	+0.14%
2023	250	−2.05%
Source: INSEE

== See also ==
- Communes of the Doubs department
