= Déservillers =

- Commune
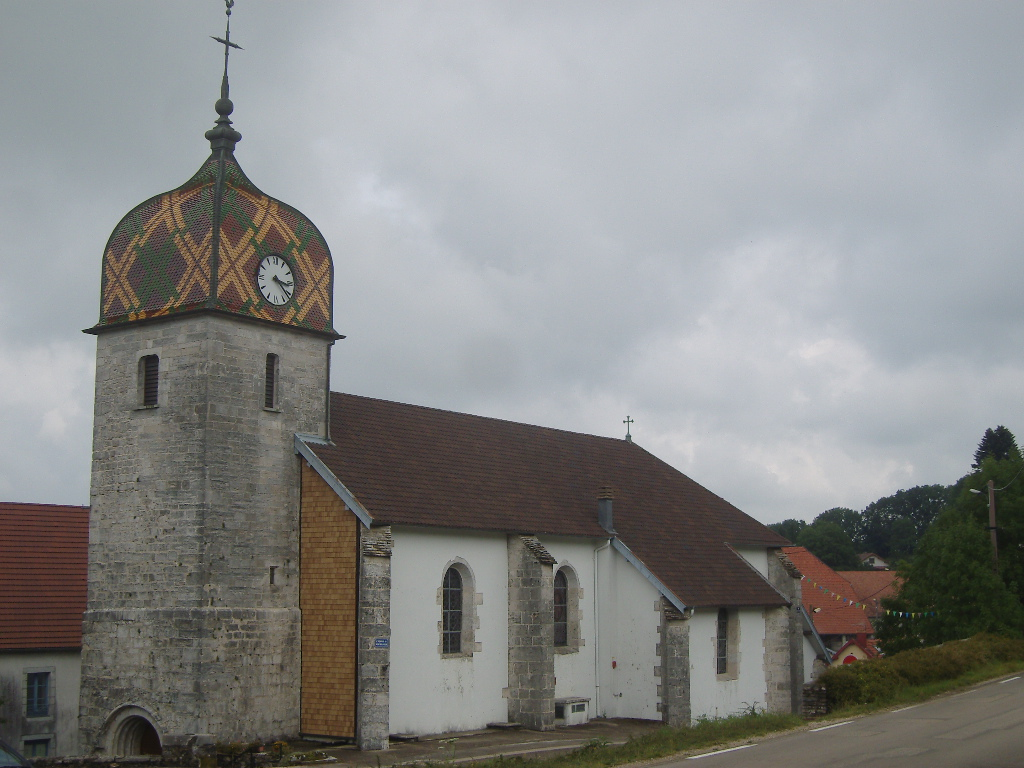
- The church in Déservillers
- Location of Déservillers
- Location within France Location within Bourgogne-Franche-Comté
- Coordinates: 47°00′13″N 6°04′20″E
- Country: France
- Region: Bourgogne-Franche-Comté
- Department: Doubs
- Arrondissement: Besançon
- Canton: Ornans
- Intercommunality: Loue-Lison

Government
  - Mayor (2020–2026): Nathalie Van de Woestyne
- Area^{1}: 13.88 km^{2} (5.36 sq mi)
- Highest elevation: 870 m (2,850 ft)
- Lowest elevation: 560 m (1,840 ft)
- Population (2023): 341
  - Density: 24.6/km^{2} (63.6/sq mi)
- Time zone: UTC+01:00 (CET)
  - Summer (DST): UTC+02:00 (CEST)
- INSEE/Postal code: 25199 /25330
- ^{1} French Land Register data, which excludes lakes, ponds, glaciers > 1 km^{2} (0.386 sq mi or 247 acres) and river estuaries.

Déservillers is a commune in the Doubs department in the Bourgogne-Franche-Comté region in eastern France.

== Population ==
Historical population
Year	Pop.	±% p.a.
1968	309	—
1975	264	−2.22%
1982	263	−0.05%
1990	288	+1.14%
1999	264	−0.96%
2007	293	+1.31%
2012	332	+2.53%
2017	339	+0.42%
2023	341	+0.10%
Source: INSEE

== See also ==
- Communes of the Doubs department
