= Bolandoz =

- Commune
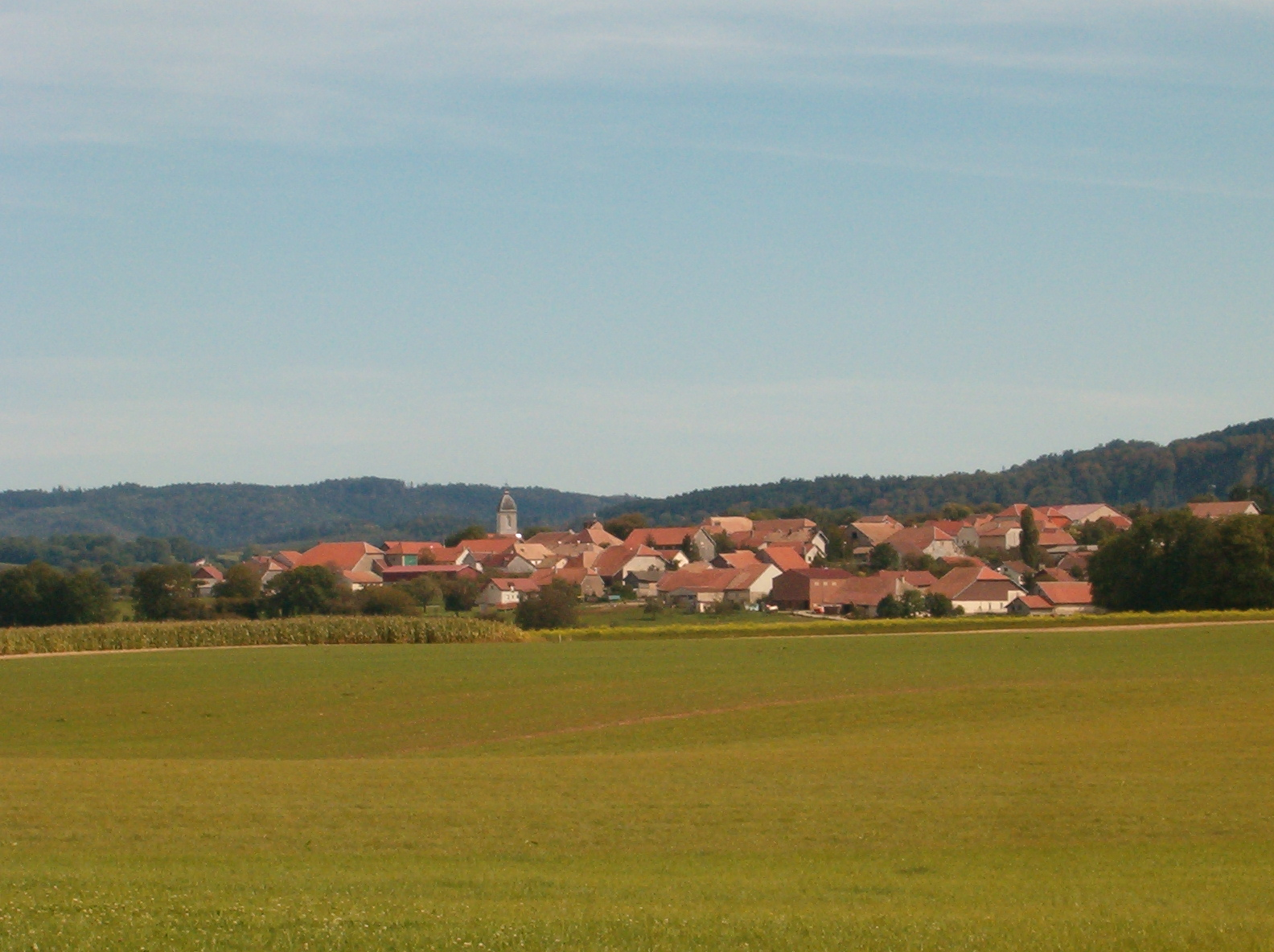
- A general view of Bolandoz
- Location of Bolandoz
- Location within France Location within Bourgogne-Franche-Comté
- Coordinates: 47°01′10″N 6°06′43″E
- Country: France
- Region: Bourgogne-Franche-Comté
- Department: Doubs
- Arrondissement: Besançon
- Canton: Ornans

Government
  - Mayor (2020–2026): Marie-Pierre Grandjean
- Area^{1}: 12.21 km^{2} (4.71 sq mi)
- Highest elevation: 910 m (2,990 ft)
- Lowest elevation: 590 m (1,940 ft)
- Population (2023): 383
  - Density: 31.4/km^{2} (81.2/sq mi)
- Time zone: UTC+01:00 (CET)
  - Summer (DST): UTC+02:00 (CEST)
- INSEE/Postal code: 25070 /25330
- ^{1} French Land Register data, which excludes lakes, ponds, glaciers > 1 km^{2} (0.386 sq mi or 247 acres) and river estuaries.

Bolandoz (French pronunciation: [bɔlɑ̃do]) is a commune in the Doubs department in the Bourgogne-Franche-Comté region in eastern France.

== Population ==
Historical population
Year	Pop.	±% p.a.
1968	294	—
1975	290	−0.20%
1982	294	+0.20%
1990	316	+0.91%
1999	299	−0.61%
2007	337	+1.51%
2012	364	+1.55%
2017	372	+0.44%
2023	383	+0.49%
Source: INSEE

== See also ==
- Communes of the Doubs department
