= Montmahoux =

- Commune
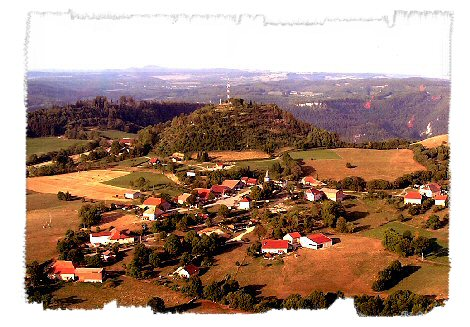
- An aerial view of Montmahoux

- Coat of arms
- Location of Montmahoux
- Location within France Location within Bourgogne-Franche-Comté
- Coordinates: 46°59′03″N 6°02′06″E
- Country: France
- Region: Bourgogne-Franche-Comté
- Department: Doubs
- Arrondissement: Besançon
- Canton: Ornans
- Intercommunality: Loue-Lison

Government
  - Mayor (2020–2026): Vincent Marguet
- Area^{1}: 6.52 km^{2} (2.52 sq mi)
- Highest elevation: 823 m (2,700 ft)
- Lowest elevation: 550 m (1,800 ft)
- Population (2023): 94
  - Density: 14/km^{2} (37/sq mi)
- Time zone: UTC+01:00 (CET)
  - Summer (DST): UTC+02:00 (CEST)
- INSEE/Postal code: 25404 /25270
- ^{1} French Land Register data, which excludes lakes, ponds, glaciers > 1 km^{2} (0.386 sq mi or 247 acres) and river estuaries.

Montmahoux (French pronunciation: [mɔ̃ma.u]) is a commune in the Doubs department in the Bourgogne-Franche-Comté region in eastern France.

== Geography ==
Montmahoux lies 8 km (5.0 mi) south of Amancey on the edge of the gorge of the Boz.

== Population ==
Historical population
Year	Pop.	±% p.a.
1968	106	—
1975	95	−1.55%
1982	76	−3.14%
1990	80	+0.64%
1999	67	−1.95%
2007	74	+1.25%
2012	105	+7.25%
2017	93	−2.40%
2023	94	+0.18%
Source: INSEE

== See also ==
- Communes of the Doubs department
