= Durnes =

- Commune
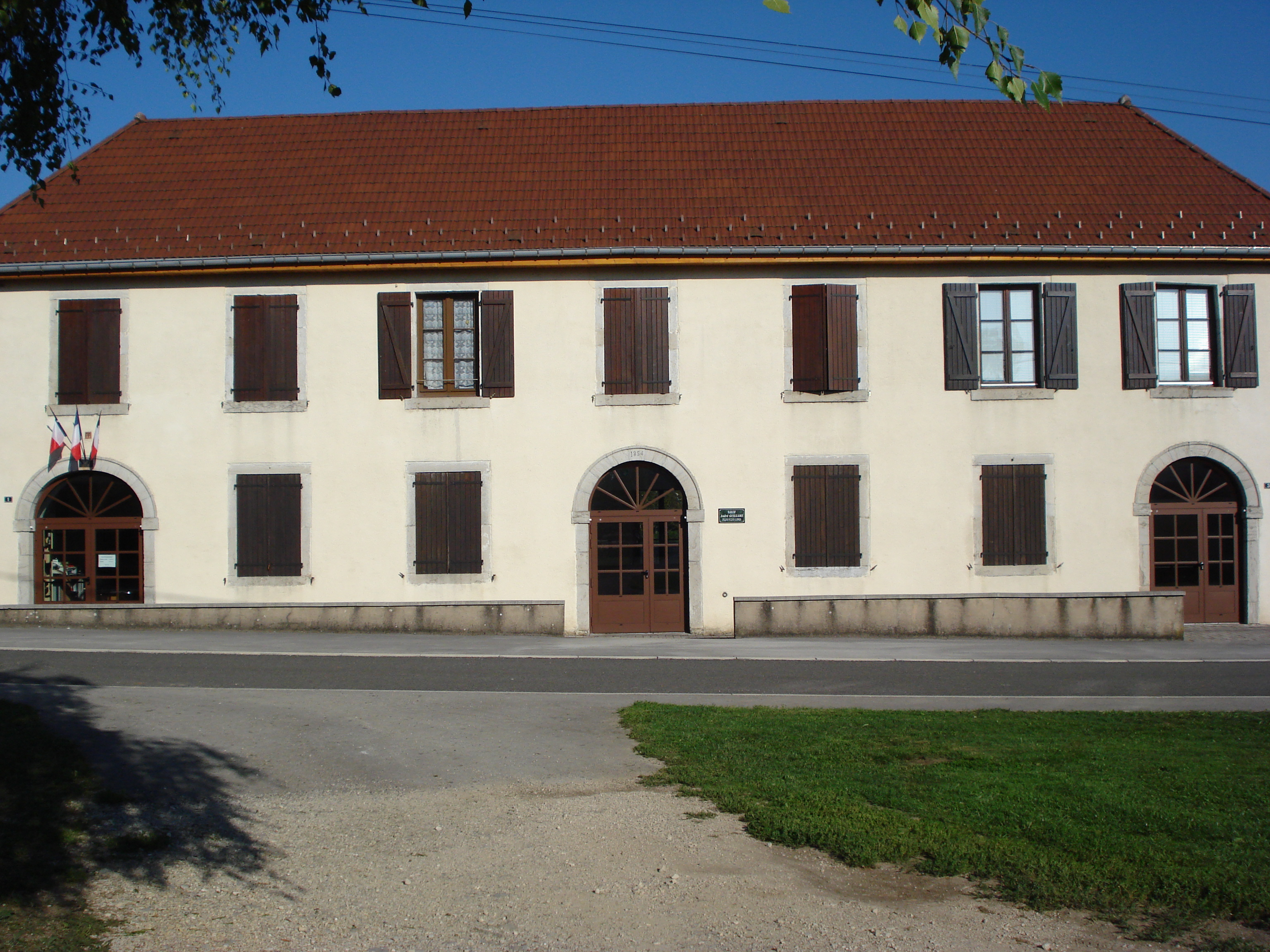
- The town hall in Durnes
- Location of Durnes
- Location within France Location within Bourgogne-Franche-Comté
- Coordinates: 47°06′32″N 6°13′56″E
- Country: France
- Region: Bourgogne-Franche-Comté
- Department: Doubs
- Arrondissement: Besançon
- Canton: Ornans

Government
  - Mayor (2020–2026): Gerard Peseux
- Area^{1}: 8.51 km^{2} (3.29 sq mi)
- Highest elevation: 618 m (2,028 ft)
- Lowest elevation: 388 m (1,273 ft)
- Population (2023): 204
  - Density: 24.0/km^{2} (62.1/sq mi)
- Time zone: UTC+01:00 (CET)
  - Summer (DST): UTC+02:00 (CEST)
- INSEE/Postal code: 25208 /25580
- ^{1} French Land Register data, which excludes lakes, ponds, glaciers > 1 km^{2} (0.386 sq mi or 247 acres) and river estuaries.

Durnes (French pronunciation: [dyʁn]) is a commune in the Doubs department in the Bourgogne-Franche-Comté region in eastern France.

== Population ==
Historical population
Year	Pop.	±% p.a.
1968	98	—
1975	90	−1.21%
1982	104	+2.09%
1990	127	+2.53%
1999	154	+2.16%
2007	156	+0.16%
2012	155	−0.13%
2017	177	+2.69%
2023	204	+2.39%
Source: INSEE

== See also ==
- Communes of the Doubs department
