= Montgesoye =

- Commune
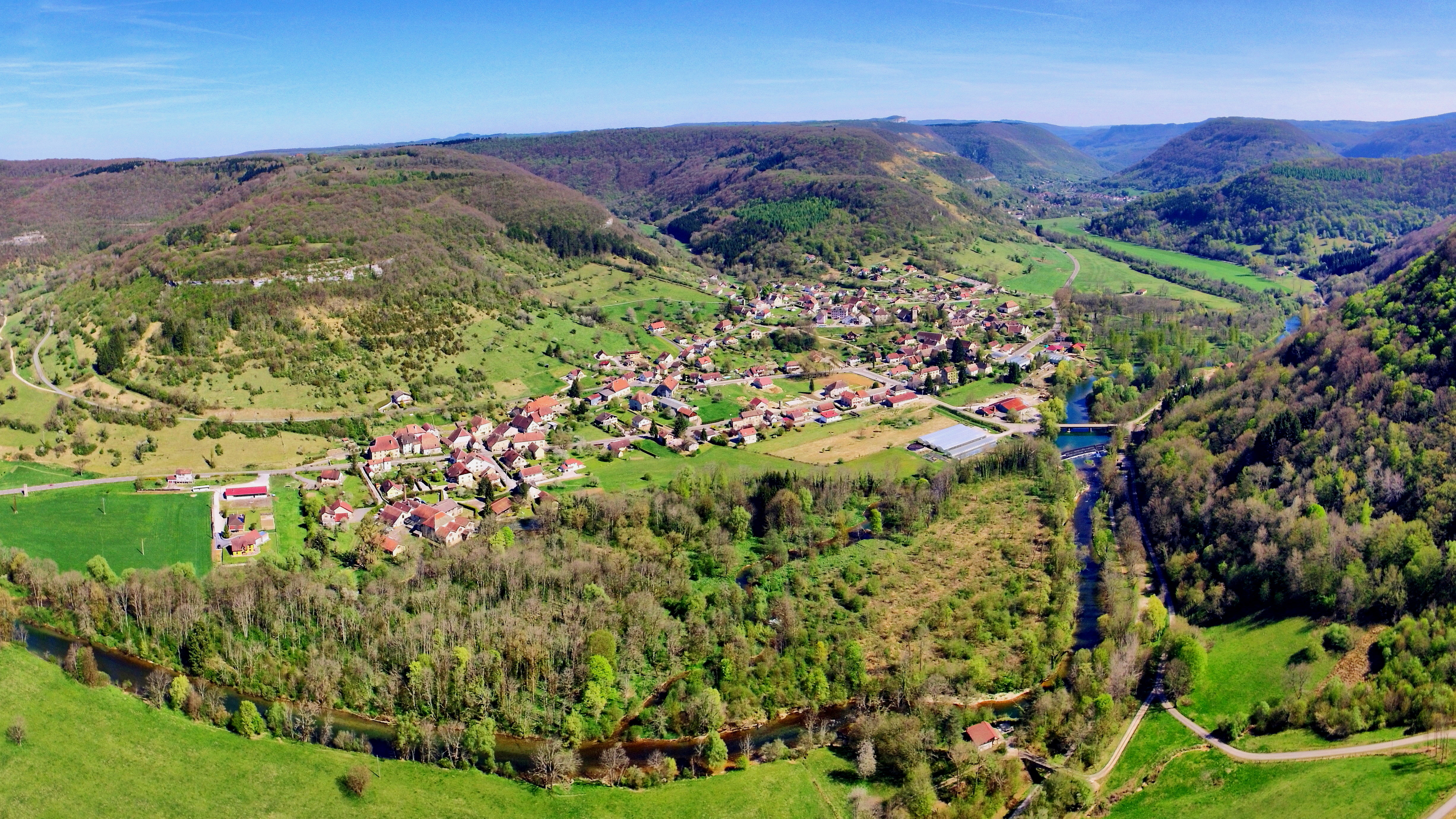
- A general view of Montgesoye

- Coat of arms
- Location of Montgesoye
- Location within France Location within Bourgogne-Franche-Comté
- Coordinates: 47°04′53″N 6°11′31″E
- Country: France
- Region: Bourgogne-Franche-Comté
- Department: Doubs
- Arrondissement: Besançon
- Canton: Ornans

Government
  - Mayor (2020–2026): Bernard Huot-Marchand
- Area^{1}: 11.06 km^{2} (4.27 sq mi)
- Highest elevation: 624 m (2,047 ft)
- Lowest elevation: 331 m (1,086 ft)
- Population (2023): 498
  - Density: 45.0/km^{2} (117/sq mi)
- Time zone: UTC+01:00 (CET)
  - Summer (DST): UTC+02:00 (CEST)
- INSEE/Postal code: 25400 /25111
- ^{1} French Land Register data, which excludes lakes, ponds, glaciers > 1 km^{2} (0.386 sq mi or 247 acres) and river estuaries.

Montgesoye (French pronunciation: [mɔ̃ʒəzwa]) is a commune in the Doubs department in the Bourgogne-Franche-Comté region in eastern France.

== Geography ==
Montgesoye lies 3 km (1.9 mi) east of Ornans.

== Population ==
Historical population
Year	Pop.	±% p.a.
1968	396	—
1975	445	+1.68%
1982	437	−0.26%
1990	408	−0.85%
1999	432	+0.64%
2007	510	+2.10%
2012	475	−1.41%
2017	465	−0.42%
2023	498	+1.15%
Source: INSEE

== See also ==
- Communes of the Doubs department
