= Bugny =

- Commune
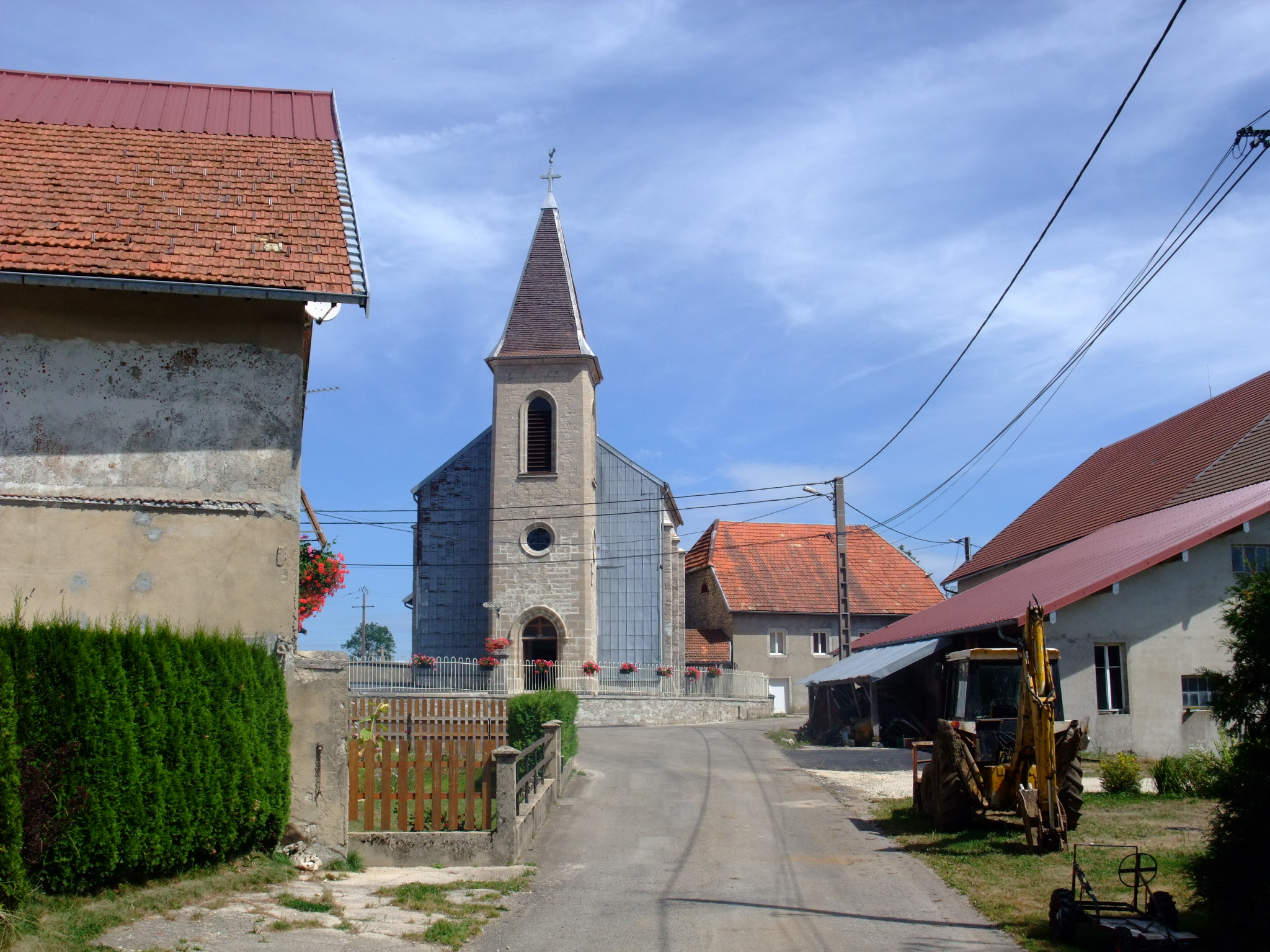
- The church and surroundings in Bugny
- Location of Bugny
- Location within France Location within Bourgogne-Franche-Comté
- Coordinates: 46°59′44″N 6°21′14″E
- Country: France
- Region: Bourgogne-Franche-Comté
- Department: Doubs
- Arrondissement: Pontarlier
- Canton: Ornans
- Intercommunality: CC entre Doubs et Loue

Government
  - Mayor (2020–2026): Frederic Laithier
- Area^{1}: 4.77 km^{2} (1.84 sq mi)
- Highest elevation: 970 m (3,180 ft)
- Lowest elevation: 845 m (2,772 ft)
- Population (2023): 257
  - Density: 53.9/km^{2} (140/sq mi)
- Time zone: UTC+01:00 (CET)
  - Summer (DST): UTC+02:00 (CEST)
- INSEE/Postal code: 25099 /25520
- ^{1} French Land Register data, which excludes lakes, ponds, glaciers > 1 km^{2} (0.386 sq mi or 247 acres) and river estuaries.

Bugny (French pronunciation: [byɲi]; Arpitan: Bunyii) is a commune in the Doubs department in the Bourgogne-Franche-Comté region in eastern France.

== Population ==
Historical population
Year	Pop.	±% p.a.
1968	88	—
1975	79	−1.53%
1982	94	+2.51%
1990	108	+1.75%
1999	115	+0.70%
2007	152	+3.55%
2012	185	+4.01%
2017	217	+3.24%
2023	257	+2.86%
Source: INSEE

== See also ==
- Communes of the Doubs department
