= Canton of Ornans =

Coordinates: 47.11°N 6.15°E

The canton of Ornans is an administrative division of the Doubs department, eastern France. Its borders were modified at the French canton reorganisation which came into effect in March 2015. Its seat is in Ornans.

It consists of the following communes:

1. Les Alliés
2. Amancey
3. Amathay-Vésigneux
4. Amondans
5. Arçon
6. Arc-sous-Cicon
7. Aubonne
8. Bolandoz
9. Bugny
10. Cademène
11. Chantrans
12. Chassagne-Saint-Denis
13. Châteauvieux-les-Fossés
14. La Chaux
15. Cléron
16. Crouzet-Migette
17. Déservillers
18. Durnes
19. Échevannes
20. Éternoz-Vallée-du-Lison
21. Évillers
22. Fertans
23. Flagey
24. Gevresin
25. Gilley
26. L'Hôpital-du-Grosbois
27. Lavans-Vuillafans
28. Lizine
29. Lods
30. Longeville
31. Maisons-du-Bois-Lièvremont
32. Malans
33. Malbrans
34. Montgesoye
35. Montmahoux
36. Les Monts-Ronds
37. Mouthier-Haute-Pierre
38. Nans-sous-Sainte-Anne
39. Ornans
40. Ouhans
41. Pays-de-Montbenoît
42. Renédale
43. Reugney
44. Sainte-Anne
45. Saint-Gorgon-Main
46. Saules
47. Scey-Maisières
48. Septfontaines
49. Silley-Amancey
50. Tarcenay-Foucherans
51. Trépot
52. Val-d'Usiers
53. Vuillafans
