= Scey-Maisières =

- Commune
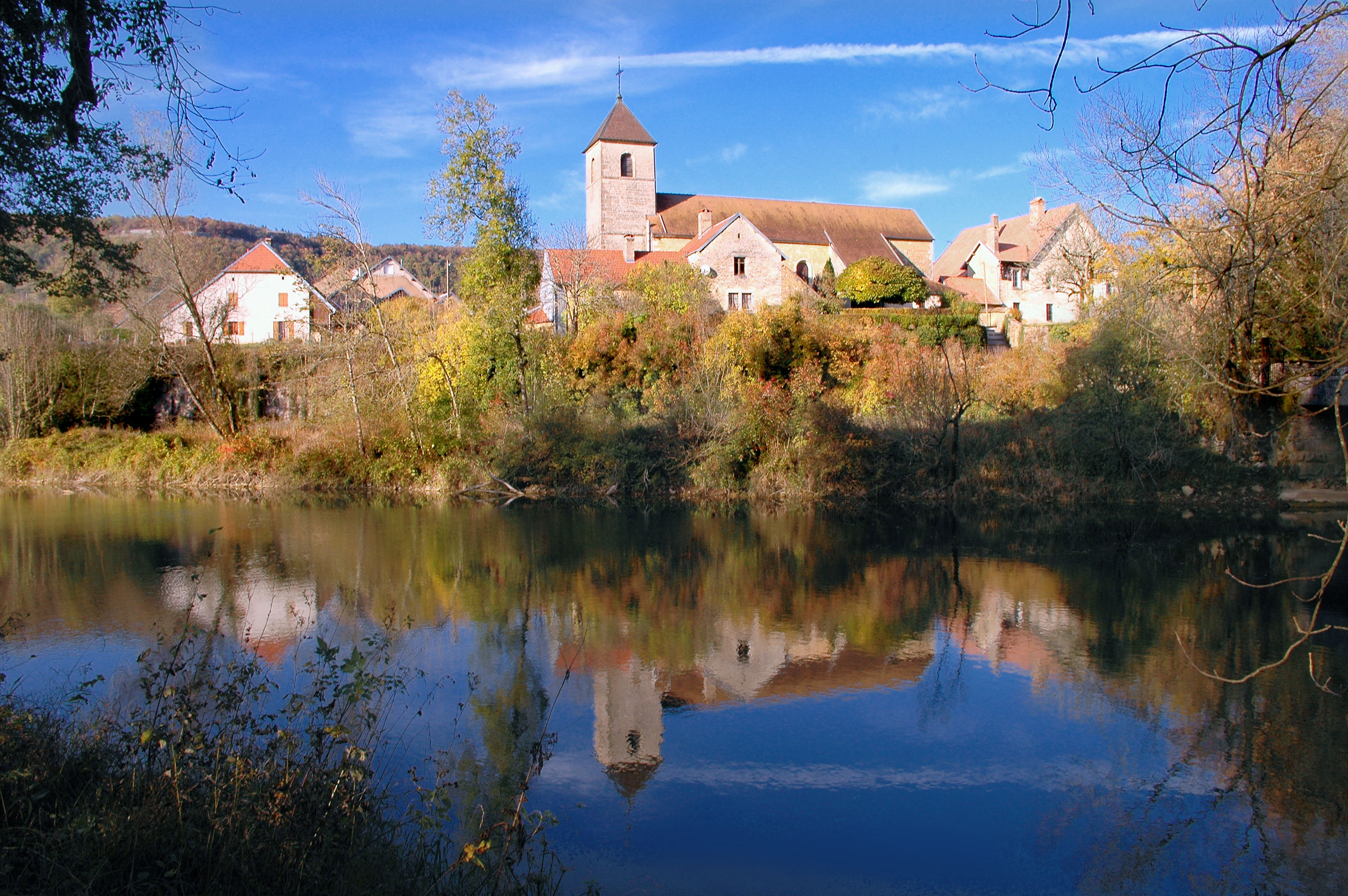
- A general view of Scey
- Location of Scey-Maisières
- Location within France Location within Bourgogne-Franche-Comté
- Coordinates: 47°06′05″N 6°04′35″E
- Country: France
- Region: Bourgogne-Franche-Comté
- Department: Doubs
- Arrondissement: Besançon
- Canton: Ornans

Government
  - Mayor (2020–2026): Laurent Brocard
- Area^{1}: 12.53 km^{2} (4.84 sq mi)
- Highest elevation: 558 m (1,831 ft)
- Lowest elevation: 305 m (1,001 ft)
- Population (2023): 286
  - Density: 22.8/km^{2} (59.1/sq mi)
- Time zone: UTC+01:00 (CET)
  - Summer (DST): UTC+02:00 (CEST)
- INSEE/Postal code: 25537 /25290
- ^{1} French Land Register data, which excludes lakes, ponds, glaciers > 1 km^{2} (0.386 sq mi or 247 acres) and river estuaries.

Scey-Maisières (French pronunciation: [sɛ mɛzjɛʁ]) is a commune in the Doubs department in the Bourgogne-Franche-Comté region in eastern France.

== Geography ==
The commune lies 4 km (2.5 mi) west of Ornans on the banks of the Loue.

== History ==
The commune was formed from the former communes of Scey-en-Varais and Maisières-Notre-Dame.

== Population ==
Historical population
Year	Pop.	±% p.a.
1968	221	—
1975	223	+0.13%
1982	208	−0.99%
1990	267	+3.17%
1999	253	−0.60%
2007	318	+2.90%
2012	308	−0.64%
2017	291	−1.13%
2023	286	−0.29%
Source: INSEE

== See also ==
- Communes of the Doubs department
