= Crouzet-Migette =

- Commune
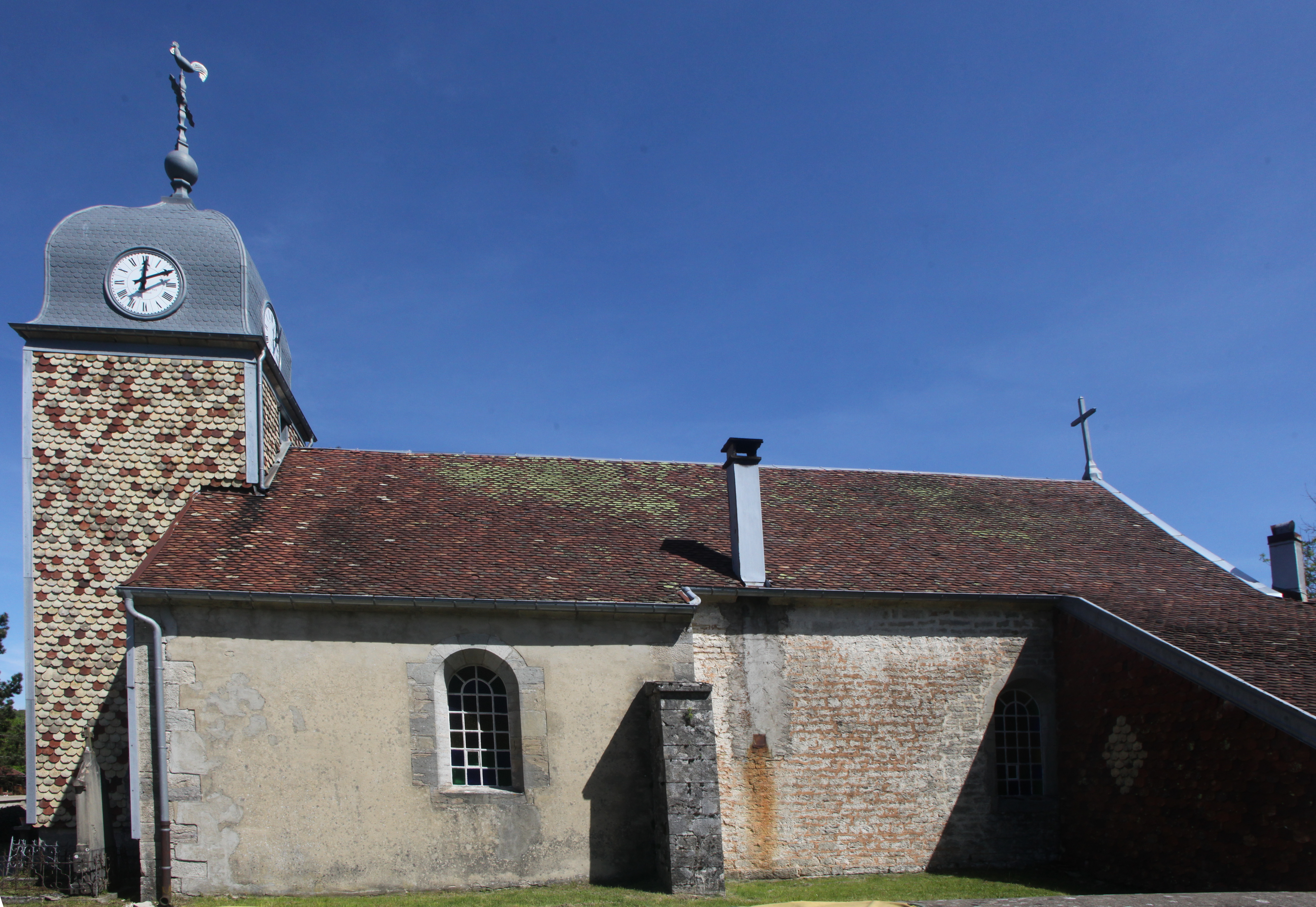
- The church in Crouzet-Migette
- Location of Crouzet-Migette
- Location within France Location within Bourgogne-Franche-Comté
- Coordinates: 46°57′28″N 6°00′45″E
- Country: France
- Region: Bourgogne-Franche-Comté
- Department: Doubs
- Arrondissement: Besançon
- Canton: Ornans
- Intercommunality: Loue-Lison

Government
  - Mayor (2020–2026): Michel Debray
- Area^{1}: 5.67 km^{2} (2.19 sq mi)
- Highest elevation: 742 m (2,434 ft)
- Lowest elevation: 490 m (1,610 ft)
- Population (2023): 118
  - Density: 20.8/km^{2} (53.9/sq mi)
- Time zone: UTC+01:00 (CET)
  - Summer (DST): UTC+02:00 (CEST)
- INSEE/Postal code: 25180 /25270
- ^{1} French Land Register data, which excludes lakes, ponds, glaciers > 1 km^{2} (0.386 sq mi or 247 acres) and river estuaries.

Crouzet-Migette (French pronunciation: [kʁuzɛ miʒɛt]) is a commune in the Doubs department in the Bourgogne-Franche-Comté region in eastern France.

== Population ==
Historical population
Year	Pop.	±% p.a.
1968	77	—
1975	52	−5.45%
1982	54	+0.54%
1990	74	+4.02%
1999	93	+2.57%
2007	135	+4.77%
2012	121	−2.17%
2017	116	−0.84%
2023	118	+0.29%
Source: INSEE

== See also ==
- Communes of the Doubs department
