= Amondans =

- Commune
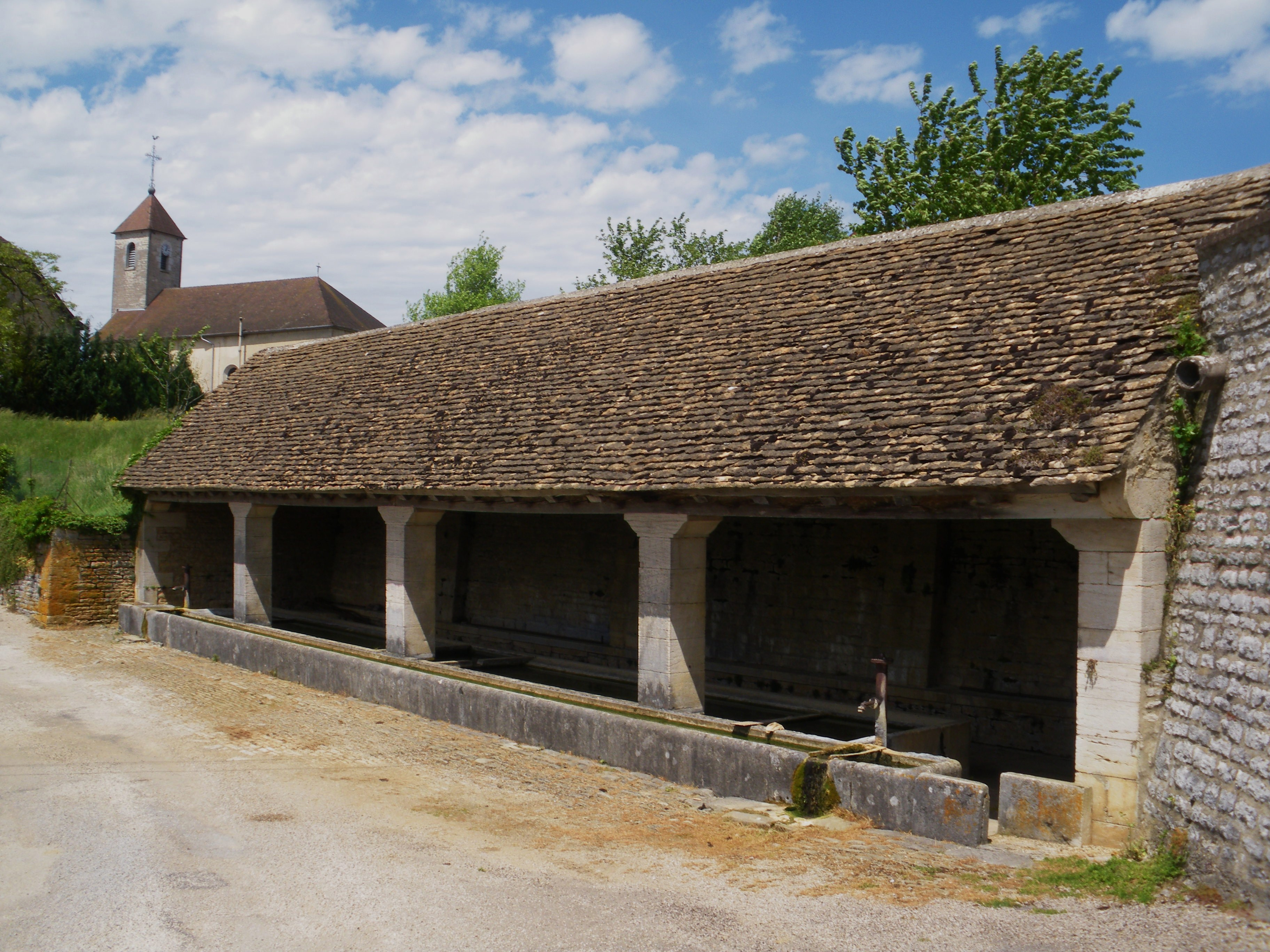
- The washhouse and church in Amondans
- Location of Amondans
- Location within France Location within Bourgogne-Franche-Comté
- Coordinates: 47°04′11″N 6°02′28″E
- Country: France
- Region: Bourgogne-Franche-Comté
- Department: Doubs
- Arrondissement: Besançon
- Canton: Ornans
- Intercommunality: Loue-Lison

Government
  - Mayor (2020–2026): Serge Monnet
- Area^{1}: 5.68 km^{2} (2.19 sq mi)
- Highest elevation: 530 m (1,740 ft)
- Lowest elevation: 296 m (971 ft)
- Population (2023): 85
  - Density: 15/km^{2} (39/sq mi)
- Time zone: UTC+01:00 (CET)
  - Summer (DST): UTC+02:00 (CEST)
- INSEE/Postal code: 25017 /25330
- ^{1} French Land Register data, which excludes lakes, ponds, glaciers > 1 km^{2} (0.386 sq mi or 247 acres) and river estuaries.

Amondans (French pronunciation: [amɔ̃dɑ̃]) is a commune in the Doubs department in the Bourgogne-Franche-Comté region in eastern France.

== Population ==
Historical population
Year	Pop.	±% p.a.
1968	79	—
1975	67	−2.33%
1982	61	−1.33%
1990	77	+2.95%
1999	96	+2.48%
2007	95	−0.13%
2012	91	−0.86%
2017	87	−0.89%
2023	85	−0.39%
Source: INSEE

Notable People:

Napoléon Coste, classical composer and guitarist (1805-1883)

== See also ==
- Communes of the Doubs department
