= Évillers =

- Commune
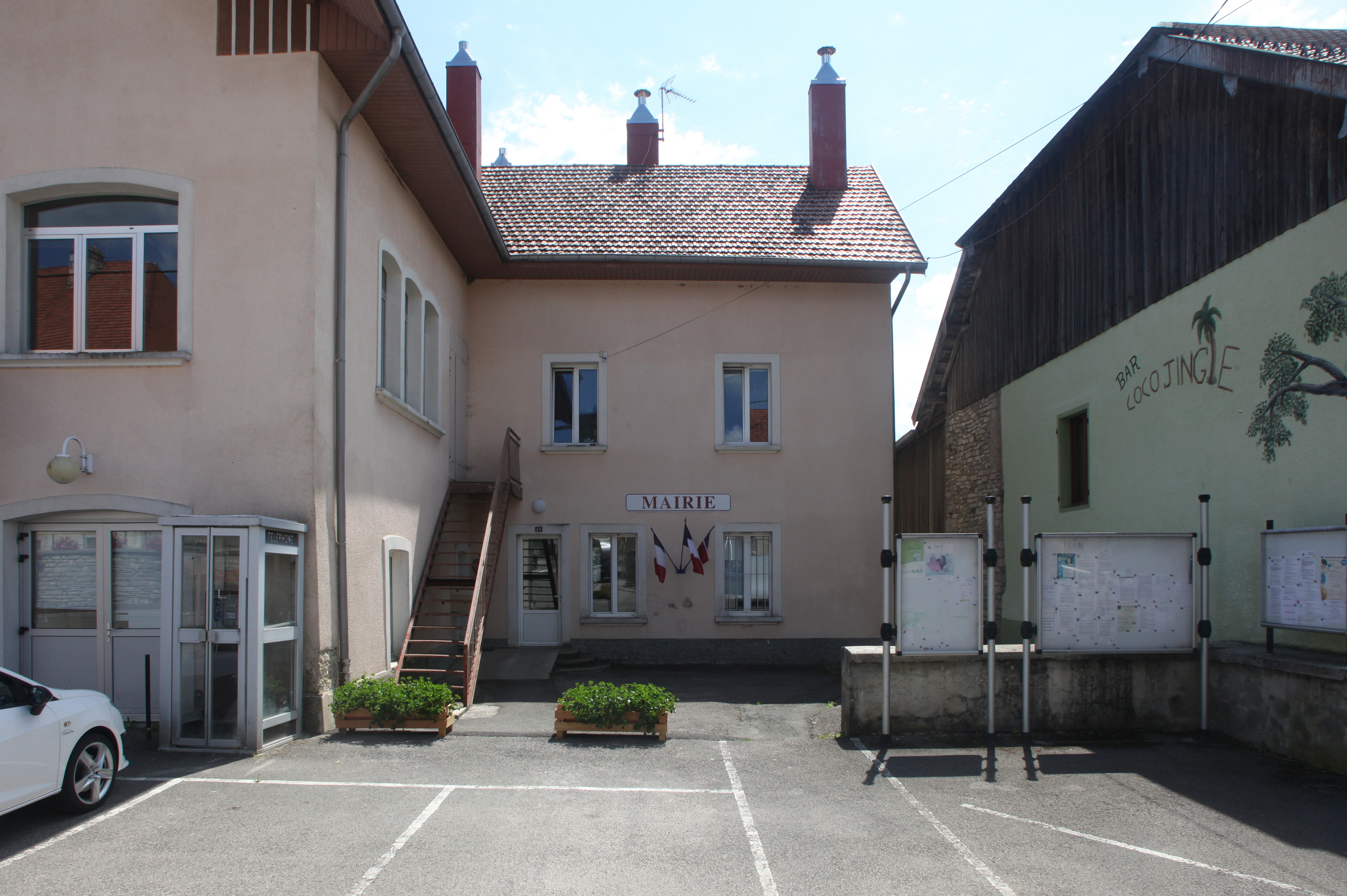
- The town hall in Évillers
- Location of Évillers
- Location within France Location within Bourgogne-Franche-Comté
- Coordinates: 47°00′03″N 6°13′36″E
- Country: France
- Region: Bourgogne-Franche-Comté
- Department: Doubs
- Arrondissement: Pontarlier
- Canton: Ornans
- Intercommunality: Altitude 800

Government
  - Mayor (2020–2026): Jean-Philippe Descourvières
- Area^{1}: 13.02 km^{2} (5.03 sq mi)
- Highest elevation: 933 m (3,061 ft)
- Lowest elevation: 690 m (2,260 ft)
- Population (2023): 387
  - Density: 29.7/km^{2} (77.0/sq mi)
- Time zone: UTC+01:00 (CET)
  - Summer (DST): UTC+02:00 (CEST)
- INSEE/Postal code: 25229 /25520
- ^{1} French Land Register data, which excludes lakes, ponds, glaciers > 1 km^{2} (0.386 sq mi or 247 acres) and river estuaries.

Évillers is a commune in the Doubs department in the Bourgogne-Franche-Comté region in eastern France.

== Population ==
Historical population
Year	Pop.	±% p.a.
1968	305	—
1975	307	+0.09%
1982	315	+0.37%
1990	283	−1.33%
1999	284	+0.04%
2007	314	+1.26%
2012	332	+1.12%
2017	366	+1.97%
2023	387	+0.93%
Source: INSEE

== See also ==
- Communes of the Doubs department
