= Trépot =

- Commune
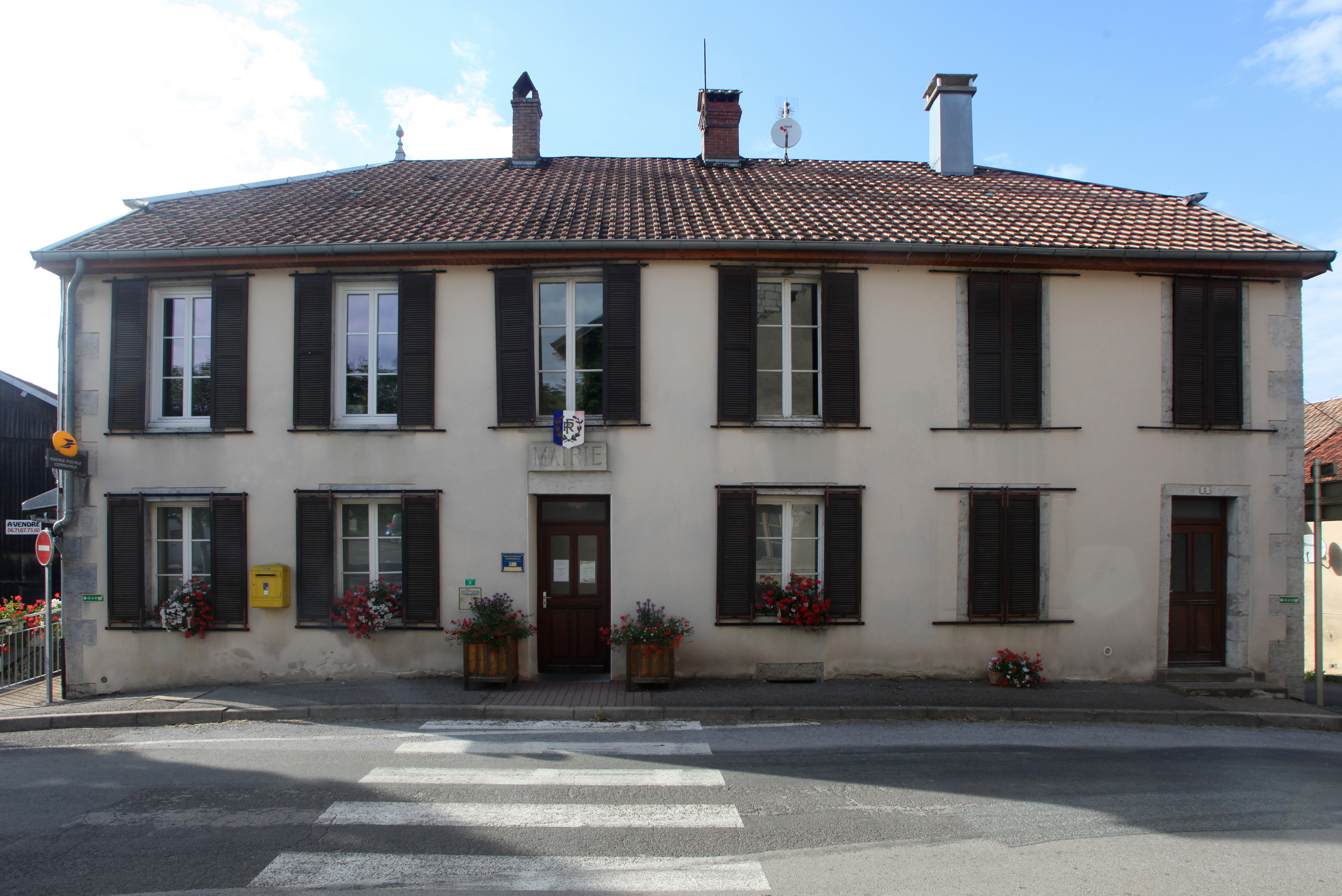
- The town hall in Trépot

- Coat of arms
- Location of Trépot
- Location within France Location within Bourgogne-Franche-Comté
- Coordinates: 47°10′01″N 6°09′03″E
- Country: France
- Region: Bourgogne-Franche-Comté
- Department: Doubs
- Arrondissement: Besançon
- Canton: Ornans

Government
  - Mayor (2020–2026): Gérard Mougin
- Area^{1}: 14.5 km^{2} (5.6 sq mi)
- Highest elevation: 661 m (2,169 ft)
- Lowest elevation: 509 m (1,670 ft)
- Population (2023): 565
  - Density: 39.0/km^{2} (101/sq mi)
- Time zone: UTC+01:00 (CET)
  - Summer (DST): UTC+02:00 (CEST)
- INSEE/Postal code: 25569 /25620
- ^{1} French Land Register data, which excludes lakes, ponds, glaciers > 1 km^{2} (0.386 sq mi or 247 acres) and river estuaries.

Trépot (French pronunciation: [tʁepo]) is a commune in the Doubs department in the Bourgogne-Franche-Comté region in eastern France.

== Geography ==
Trépot lies 13 km (8.1 mi) from Ornans.

== Population ==
Historical population
Year	Pop.	±% p.a.
1968	274	—
1975	306	+1.59%
1982	361	+2.39%
1990	379	+0.61%
1999	356	−0.69%
2007	495	+4.21%
2012	513	+0.72%
2017	532	+0.73%
2023	565	+1.01%
Source: INSEE

== See also ==
- Communes of the Doubs department
