= Saules, Doubs =

Saules
- Commune
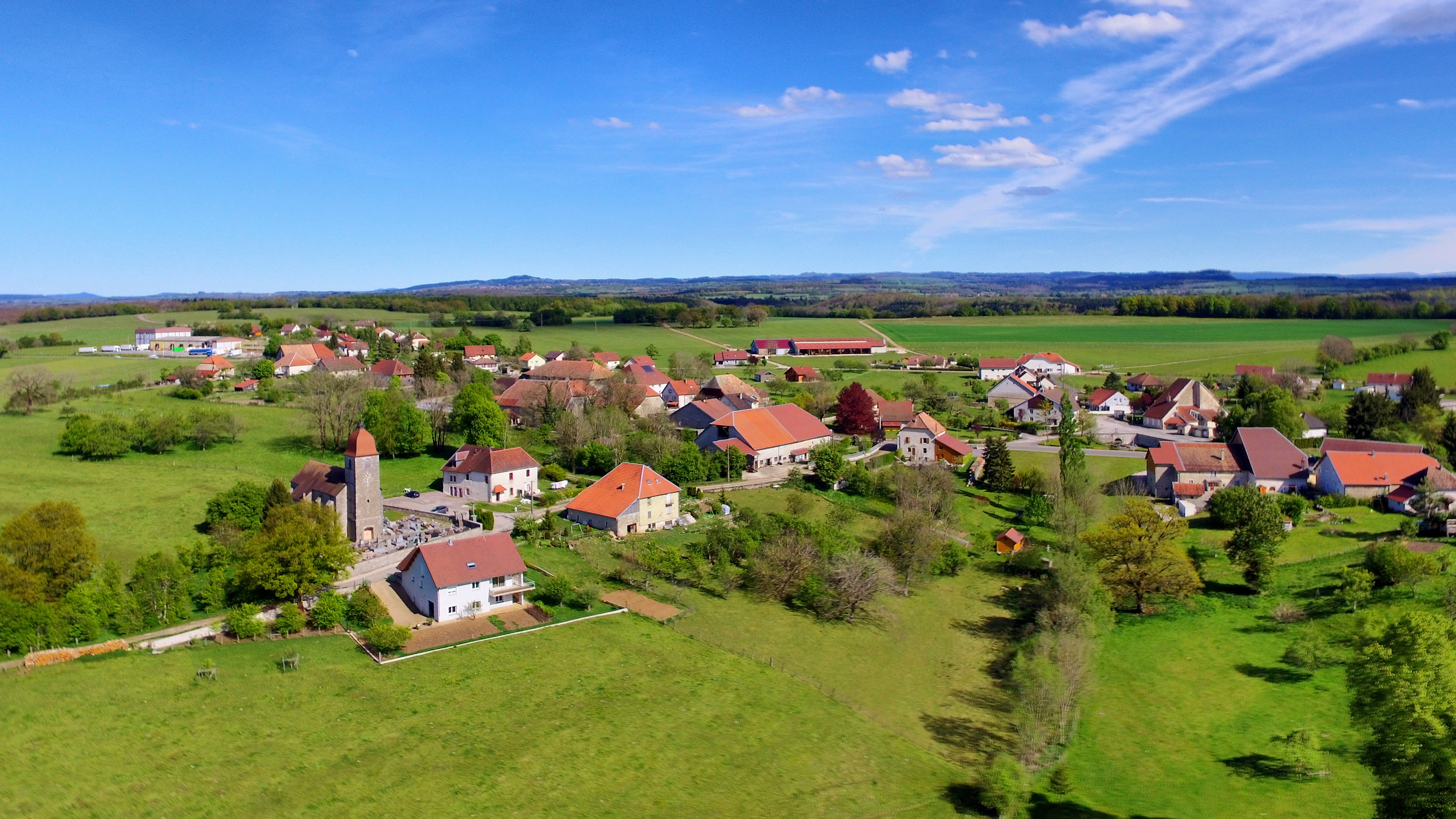
- Aerial view

- Coat of arms
- Location of Saules
- Location within France Location within Bourgogne-Franche-Comté
- Coordinates: 47°07′27″N 6°11′59″E
- Country: France
- Region: Bourgogne-Franche-Comté
- Department: Doubs
- Arrondissement: Besançon
- Canton: Ornans

Government
  - Mayor (2020–2026): Louis Daudey
- Area^{1}: 7.64 km^{2} (2.95 sq mi)
- Highest elevation: 607 m (1,991 ft)
- Lowest elevation: 369 m (1,211 ft)
- Population (2023): 234
  - Density: 30.6/km^{2} (79.3/sq mi)
- Time zone: UTC+01:00 (CET)
  - Summer (DST): UTC+02:00 (CEST)
- INSEE/Postal code: 25535 /25580
- ^{1} French Land Register data, which excludes lakes, ponds, glaciers > 1 km^{2} (0.386 sq mi or 247 acres) and river estuaries.

Saules (French pronunciation: [sol]) is a commune in the Doubs department in the Bourgogne-Franche-Comté region eastern France.

== Geography ==
Saules lies 6 km (3.7 mi) northeast of Ornans above the valley of the Loue.

== Population ==
Historical population
Year	Pop.	±% p.a.
1968	155	—
1975	142	−1.24%
1982	159	+1.63%
1990	177	+1.35%
1999	189	+0.73%
2007	205	+1.02%
2012	226	+1.97%
2017	226	+0.00%
2023	234	+0.58%
Source: INSEE

== See also ==
- Communes of the Doubs department
