= Fertans =

- Commune
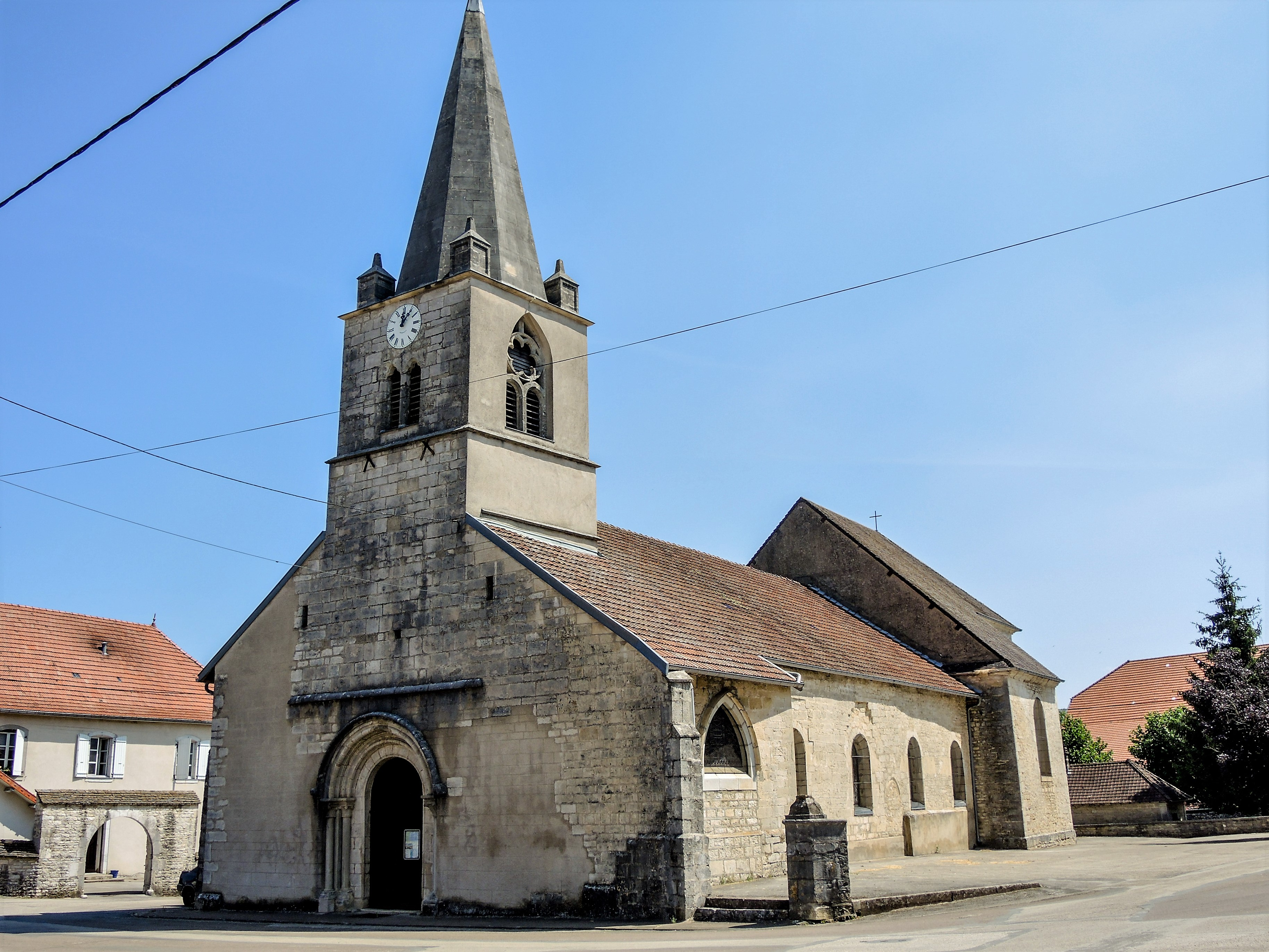
- The church in Fertans

- Coat of arms
- Location of Fertans
- Location within France Location within Bourgogne-Franche-Comté
- Coordinates: 47°03′07″N 6°03′51″E
- Country: France
- Region: Bourgogne-Franche-Comté
- Department: Doubs
- Arrondissement: Besançon
- Canton: Ornans
- Intercommunality: Loue-Lison

Government
  - Mayor (2020–2026): Adrien Bart
- Area^{1}: 8.19 km^{2} (3.16 sq mi)
- Highest elevation: 583 m (1,913 ft)
- Lowest elevation: 350 m (1,150 ft)
- Population (2023): 319
  - Density: 38.9/km^{2} (101/sq mi)
- Time zone: UTC+01:00 (CET)
  - Summer (DST): UTC+02:00 (CEST)
- INSEE/Postal code: 25236 /25330
- ^{1} French Land Register data, which excludes lakes, ponds, glaciers > 1 km^{2} (0.386 sq mi or 247 acres) and river estuaries.

Fertans (French pronunciation: [fɛʁtɑ̃]) is a commune in the Doubs department in the Bourgogne-Franche-Comté region in eastern France.

== Population ==
Historical population
Year	Pop.	±% p.a.
1968	154	—
1975	152	−0.19%
1982	169	+1.53%
1990	155	−1.08%
1999	217	+3.81%
2007	235	+1.00%
2012	260	+2.04%
2017	256	−0.31%
2023	319	+3.73%
Source: INSEE

== See also ==
- Communes of the Doubs department
