= L'Hôpital-du-Grosbois =

- Commune
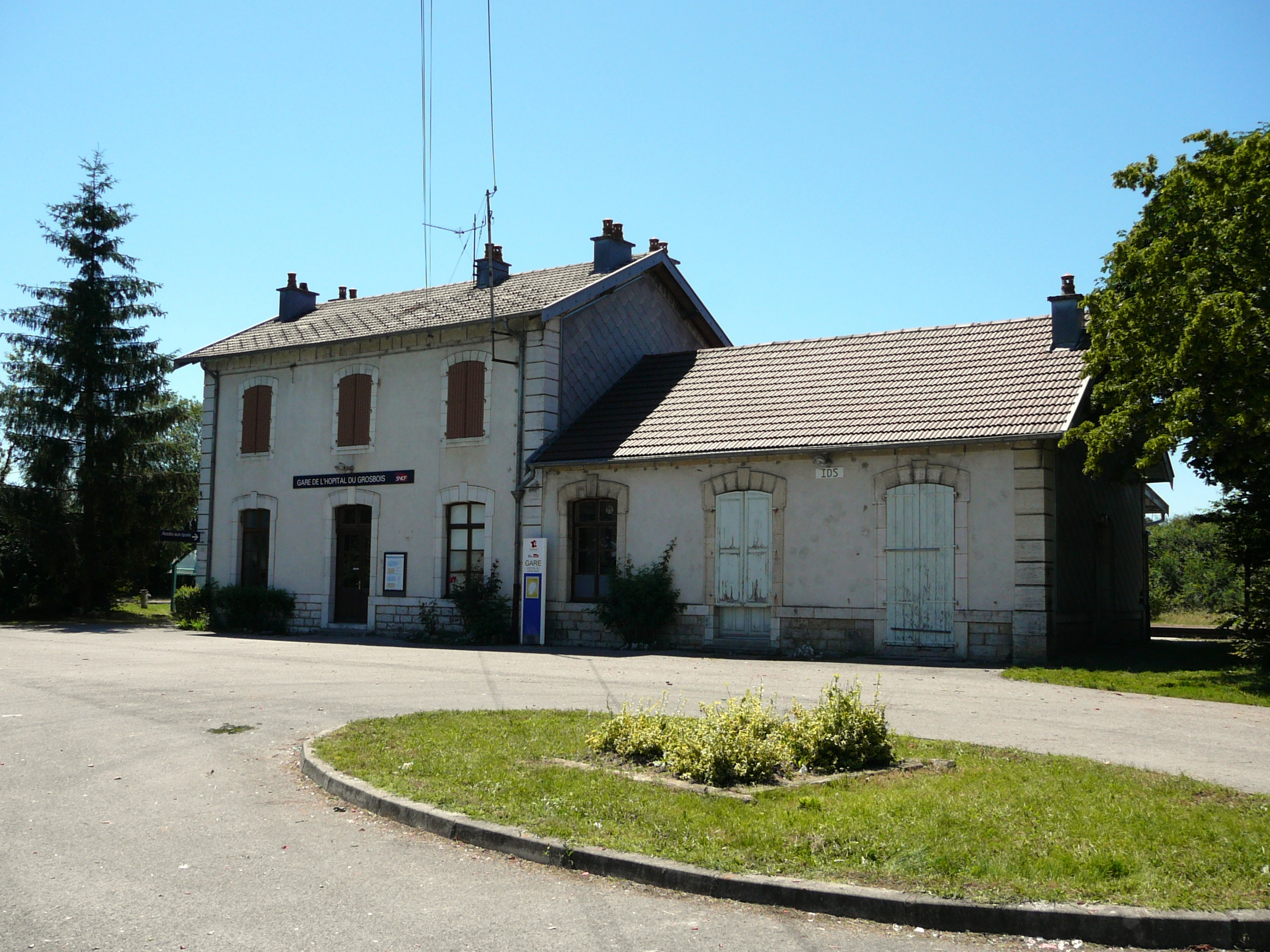
- Train station

- Coat of arms
- Location of L'Hôpital-du-Grosbois
- Location within France Location within Bourgogne-Franche-Comté
- Coordinates: 47°10′22″N 6°13′02″E
- Country: France
- Region: Bourgogne-Franche-Comté
- Department: Doubs
- Arrondissement: Besançon
- Canton: Ornans

Government
  - Mayor (2020–2026): Jean-Claude Grenier
- Area^{1}: 7.84 km^{2} (3.03 sq mi)
- Highest elevation: 681 m (2,234 ft)
- Lowest elevation: 509 m (1,670 ft)
- Population (2023): 611
  - Density: 77.9/km^{2} (202/sq mi)
- Time zone: UTC+01:00 (CET)
  - Summer (DST): UTC+02:00 (CEST)
- INSEE/Postal code: 25305 /25620
- ^{1} French Land Register data, which excludes lakes, ponds, glaciers > 1 km^{2} (0.386 sq mi or 247 acres) and river estuaries.

L'Hôpital-du-Grosbois (French pronunciation: [lopital dy ɡʁobwa]) is a commune in the Doubs department in the Bourgogne-Franche-Comté region in eastern France.

== Population ==
Historical population
Year	Pop.	±% p.a.
1968	257	—
1975	279	+1.18%
1982	349	+3.25%
1990	349	+0.00%
1999	377	+0.86%
2007	516	+4.00%
2012	554	+1.43%
2017	598	+1.54%
2023	611	+0.36%
Source: INSEE

== See also ==
- Communes of the Doubs department
