= Septfontaines, Doubs =

Septfontaines
- Commune
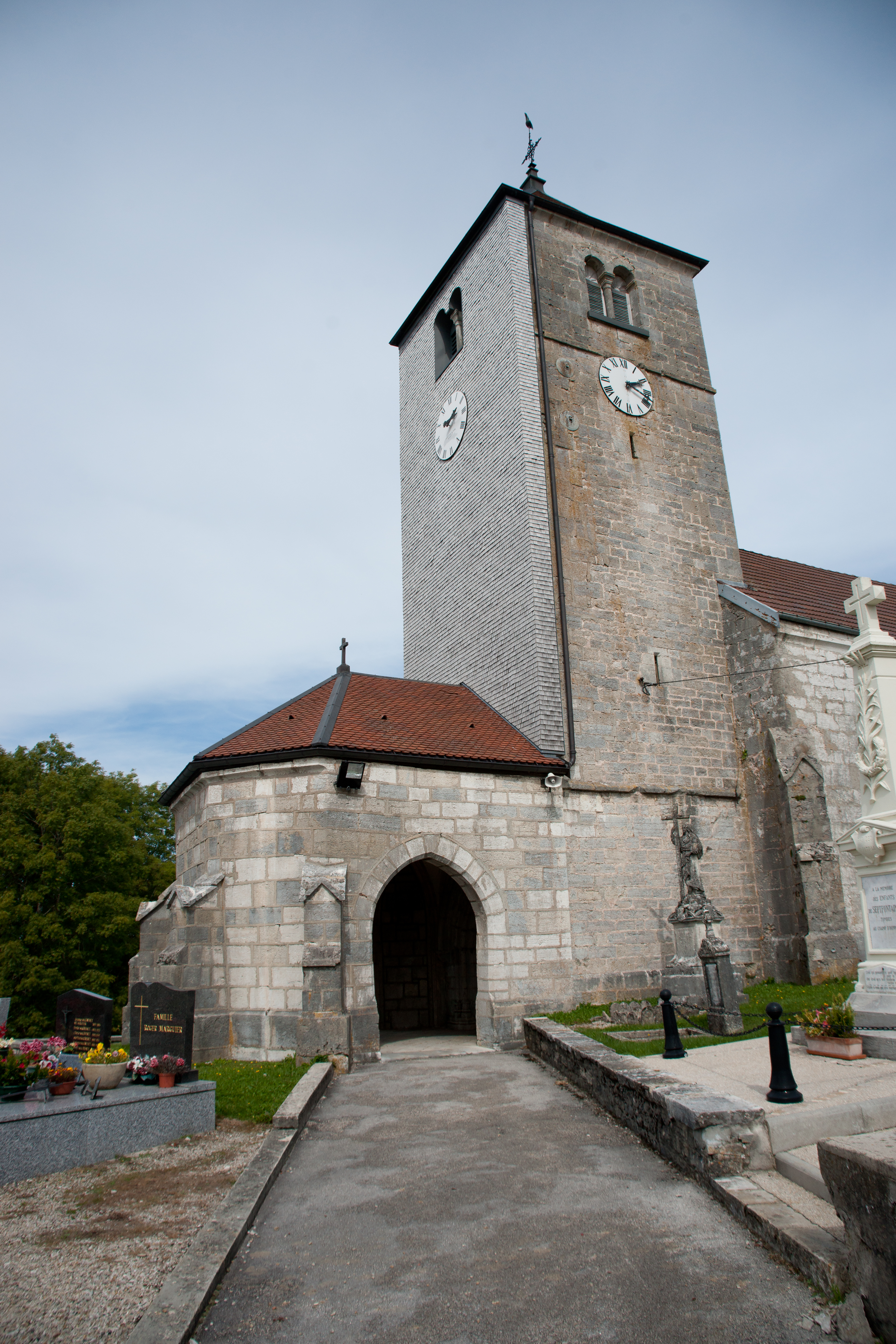
- The church in Septfontaines
- Location of Septfontaines
- Location within France Location within Bourgogne-Franche-Comté
- Coordinates: 46°58′58″N 6°11′02″E
- Country: France
- Region: Bourgogne-Franche-Comté
- Department: Doubs
- Arrondissement: Pontarlier
- Canton: Ornans
- Intercommunality: Altitude 800

Government
  - Mayor (2020–2026): Christian Ratte
- Area^{1}: 18.37 km^{2} (7.09 sq mi)
- Highest elevation: 810 m (2,660 ft)
- Lowest elevation: 700 m (2,300 ft)
- Population (2023): 371
  - Density: 20.2/km^{2} (52.3/sq mi)
- Time zone: UTC+01:00 (CET)
  - Summer (DST): UTC+02:00 (CEST)
- INSEE/Postal code: 25541 /25270
- ^{1} French Land Register data, which excludes lakes, ponds, glaciers > 1 km^{2} (0.386 sq mi or 247 acres) and river estuaries.

Septfontaines (French pronunciation: [sɛfɔ̃tɛn]) is a commune in the Doubs department in the Bourgogne-Franche-Comté region in eastern France.

== Geography ==
Septfontaines lies on the ancient royal road between Besançon and Pontarlier 6 km (3.7 mi) northeast of Pontarlier near the Swiss border.

== Population ==
Historical population
| Year | Pop. | ±% p.a. |
|---|---|---|
| 1968 | 276 | — |
| 1975 | 254 | −1.18% |
| 1982 | 236 | −1.04% |
| 1990 | 233 | −0.16% |
| 1999 | 254 | +0.96% |
| 2007 | 283 | +1.36% |
| 2012 | 331 | +3.18% |
| 2017 | 368 | +2.14% |
| 2023 | 371 | +0.14% |
Source: INSEE

== See also ==
- Communes of the Doubs department
