= Silley-Amancey =

- Commune
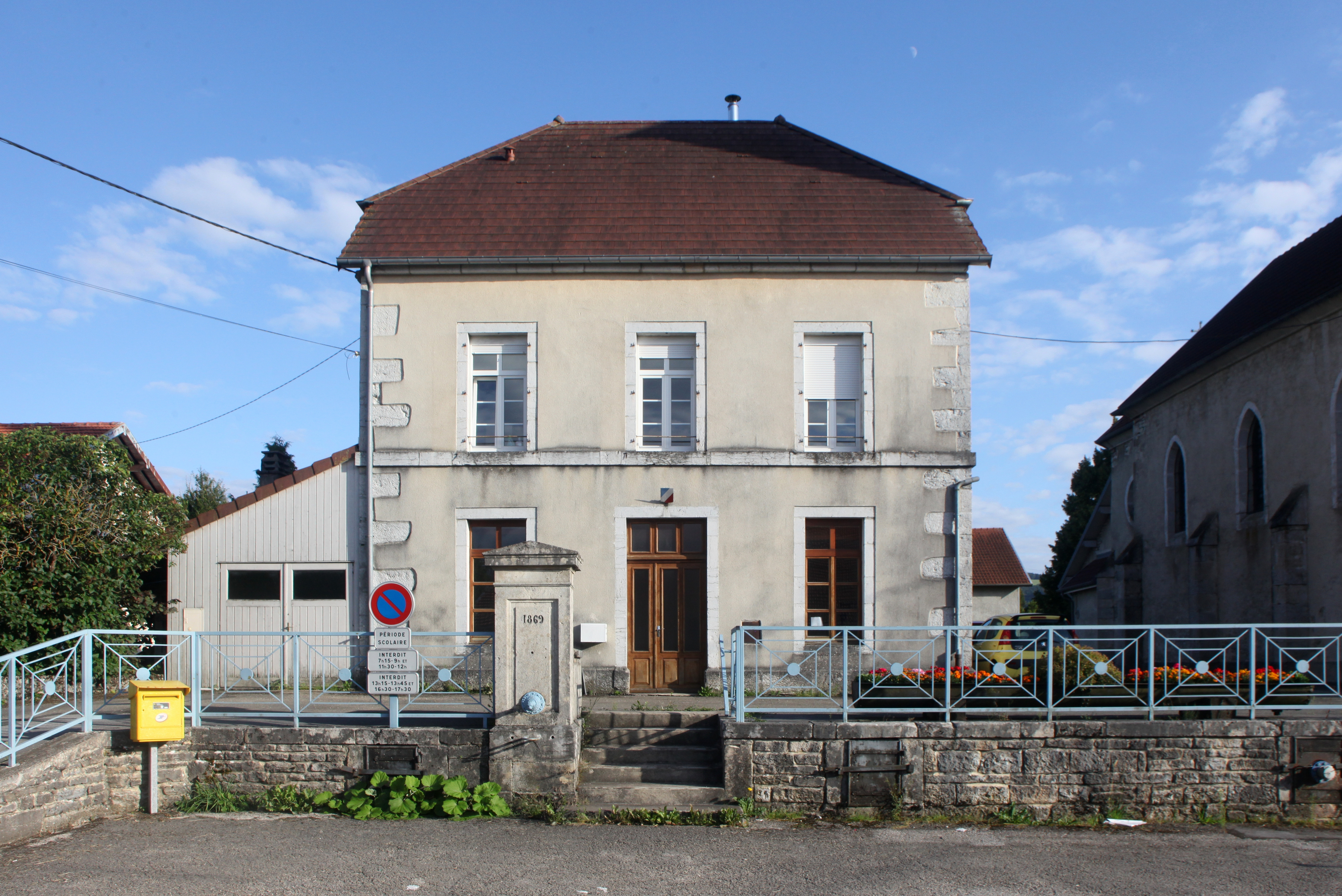
- The town hall in Silley-Amancey
- Location of Silley-Amancey
- Location within France Location within Bourgogne-Franche-Comté
- Coordinates: 47°01′58″N 6°08′24″E
- Country: France
- Region: Bourgogne-Franche-Comté
- Department: Doubs
- Arrondissement: Besançon
- Canton: Ornans
- Intercommunality: Loue-Lison

Government
  - Mayor (2020–2026): Yves Cuinet
- Area^{1}: 5.16 km^{2} (1.99 sq mi)
- Highest elevation: 690 m (2,260 ft)
- Lowest elevation: 470 m (1,540 ft)
- Population (2023): 129
  - Density: 25.0/km^{2} (64.7/sq mi)
- Time zone: UTC+01:00 (CET)
  - Summer (DST): UTC+02:00 (CEST)
- INSEE/Postal code: 25545 /25330
- ^{1} French Land Register data, which excludes lakes, ponds, glaciers > 1 km^{2} (0.386 sq mi or 247 acres) and river estuaries.

Silley-Amancey (French pronunciation: [sijɛ amɑ̃sɛ]) is a commune in the Doubs department in the Bourgogne-Franche-Comté region in eastern France.

== Geography ==
The commune lies 30 km (19 mi) south of Besançon.

== Population ==
Historical population
Year	Pop.	±% p.a.
1968	74	—
1975	72	−0.39%
1982	64	−1.67%
1990	71	+1.31%
1999	110	+4.98%
2007	117	+0.77%
2012	126	+1.49%
2017	140	+2.13%
2023	129	−1.35%
Source: INSEE

== See also ==
- Communes of the Doubs department
