= Aubonne, Doubs =

Aubonne
- Commune
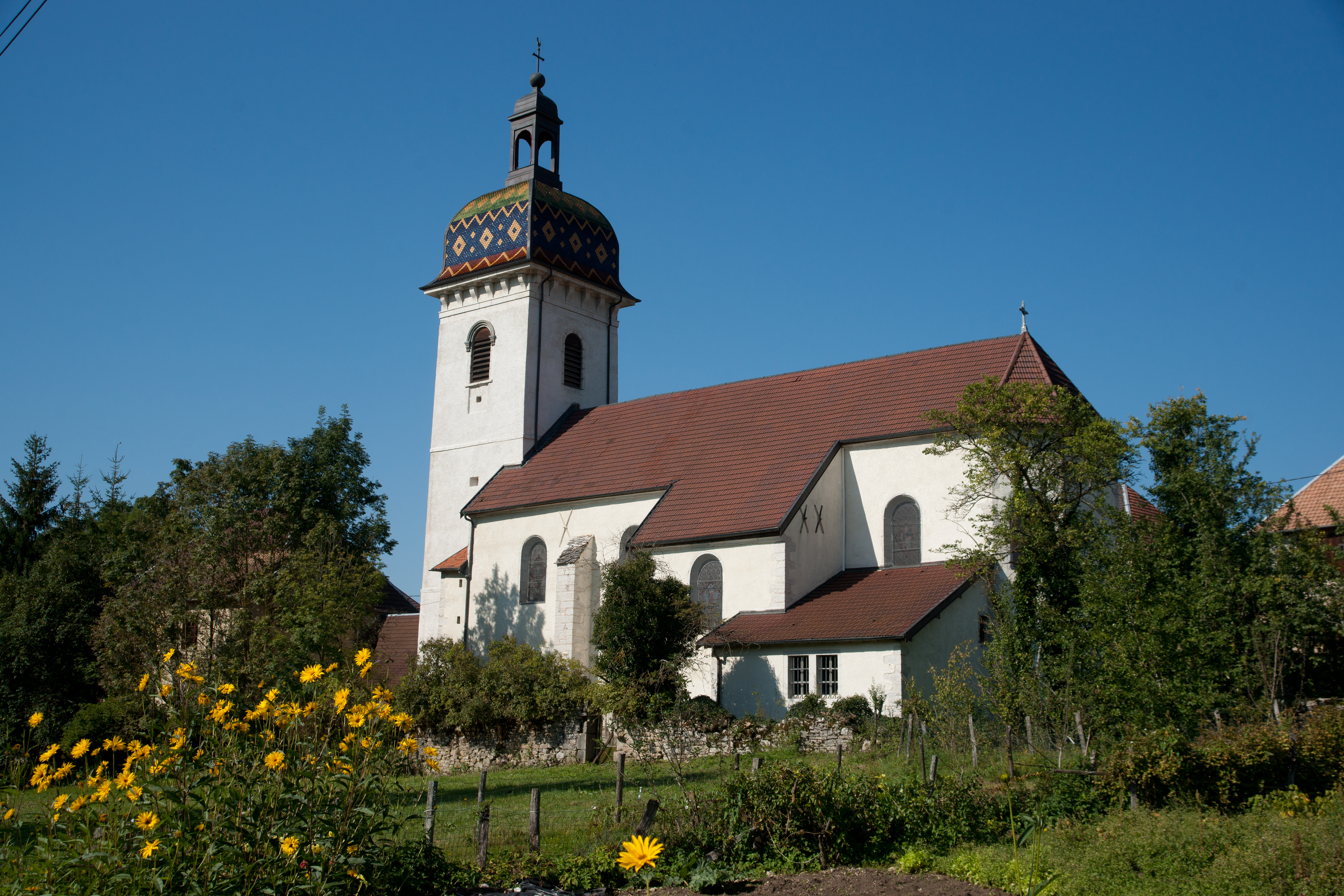
- The church in Aubonne

- Coat of arms
- Location of Aubonne
- Location within France Location within Bourgogne-Franche-Comté
- Coordinates: 47°02′12″N 6°19′46″E
- Country: France
- Region: Bourgogne-Franche-Comté
- Department: Doubs
- Arrondissement: Pontarlier
- Canton: Ornans
- Intercommunality: CC entre Doubs et Loue

Government
  - Mayor (2020–2026): Pierre Combe
- Area^{1}: 15.17 km^{2} (5.86 sq mi)
- Highest elevation: 1,091 m (3,579 ft)
- Lowest elevation: 598 m (1,962 ft)
- Population (2023): 266
  - Density: 17.5/km^{2} (45.4/sq mi)
- Time zone: UTC+01:00 (CET)
  - Summer (DST): UTC+02:00 (CEST)
- INSEE/Postal code: 25029 /25520
- ^{1} French Land Register data, which excludes lakes, ponds, glaciers > 1 km^{2} (0.386 sq mi or 247 acres) and river estuaries.

Aubonne (French pronunciation: [obɔn]) is a commune in the Doubs department in the Bourgogne-Franche-Comté region in eastern France.

== Population ==
Historical population
Year	Pop.	±% p.a.
1968	246	—
1975	234	−0.71%
1982	245	+0.66%
1990	266	+1.03%
1999	256	−0.42%
2007	245	−0.55%
2012	228	−1.43%
2017	240	+1.03%
2023	266	+1.73%
Source: INSEE

== See also ==
- Communes of the Doubs department
