= Malans, Doubs =

Malans
- Commune
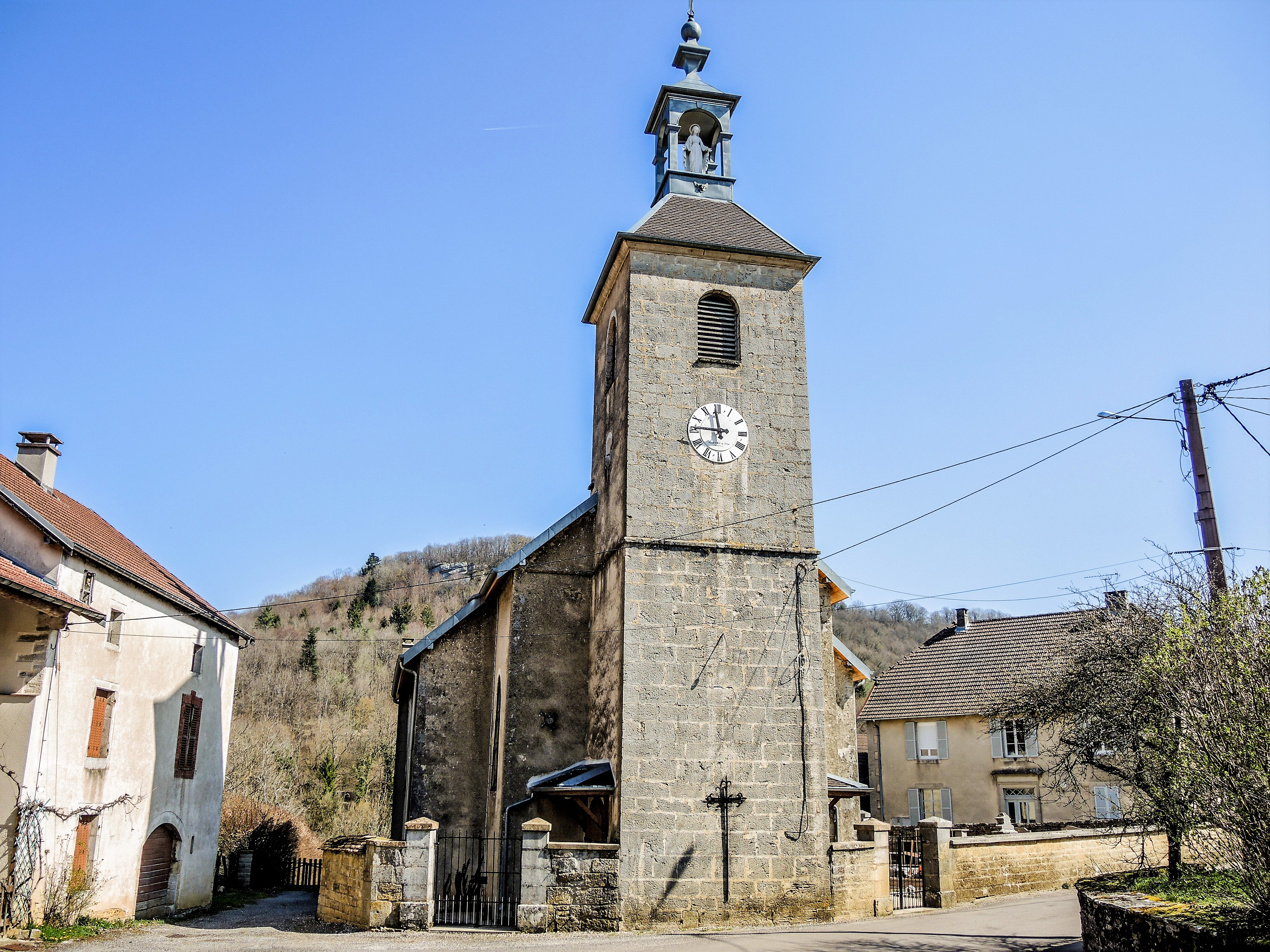
- The church in Malans

- Coat of arms
- Location of Malans
- Location within France Location within Bourgogne-Franche-Comté
- Coordinates: 47°02′55″N 6°01′54″E
- Country: France
- Region: Bourgogne-Franche-Comté
- Department: Doubs
- Arrondissement: Besançon
- Canton: Ornans
- Intercommunality: Loue-Lison

Government
  - Mayor (2020–2026): Mickaël Nicolet
- Area^{1}: 10.49 km^{2} (4.05 sq mi)
- Highest elevation: 595 m (1,952 ft)
- Lowest elevation: 370 m (1,210 ft)
- Population (2023): 157
  - Density: 15.0/km^{2} (38.8/sq mi)
- Time zone: UTC+01:00 (CET)
  - Summer (DST): UTC+02:00 (CEST)
- INSEE/Postal code: 25359 /25330
- ^{1} French Land Register data, which excludes lakes, ponds, glaciers > 1 km^{2} (0.386 sq mi or 247 acres) and river estuaries.

Malans (French pronunciation: [malɑ̃]) is a commune in the Doubs department in the Bourgogne-Franche-Comté region in eastern France.

== Geography ==
Malans is located 3.5 km (2.2 mi) south of Amancey. Two streams pass through the commune: the Bietard and the Anchet.

The commune includes the villages of Saint Loup, Simorin, and Val Sainte Marie.

== History ==
The history of the commune goes back to the monastery of Val Sainte Marie established in the 18th century. The monks eventually abandoned the monastery, but left numerous religious edifices and shrines.

== Population ==
Historical population
Year	Pop.	±% p.a.
1968	139	—
1975	107	−3.67%
1982	108	+0.13%
1990	130	+2.34%
1999	145	+1.22%
2007	154	+0.76%
2012	163	+1.14%
2017	173	+1.20%
2023	157	−1.60%
Source: INSEE

== See also ==
- Communes of the Doubs department
