= Amathay-Vésigneux =

- Commune
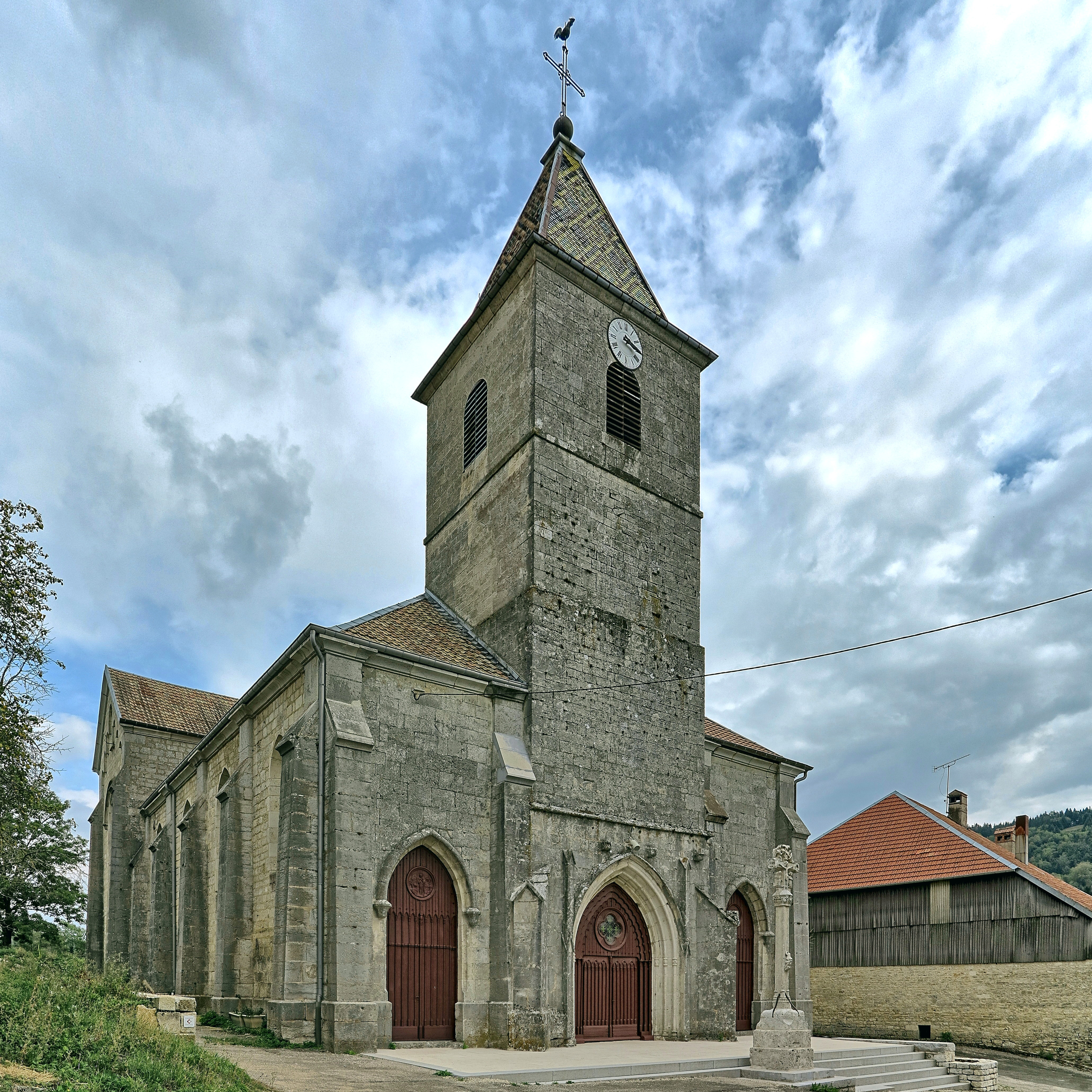
- The church in Amathay-Vésigneux
- Location of Amathay-Vésigneux
- Location within France Location within Bourgogne-Franche-Comté
- Coordinates: 47°01′28″N 6°12′03″E
- Country: France
- Region: Bourgogne-Franche-Comté
- Department: Doubs
- Arrondissement: Besançon
- Canton: Ornans
- Intercommunality: Loue-Lison

Government
  - Mayor (2020–2026): Alexandre Coulet
- Area^{1}: 12.13 km^{2} (4.68 sq mi)
- Highest elevation: 921 m (3,022 ft)
- Lowest elevation: 642 m (2,106 ft)
- Population (2023): 175
  - Density: 14.4/km^{2} (37.4/sq mi)
- Time zone: UTC+01:00 (CET)
  - Summer (DST): UTC+02:00 (CEST)
- INSEE/Postal code: 25016 /25330
- ^{1} French Land Register data, which excludes lakes, ponds, glaciers > 1 km^{2} (0.386 sq mi or 247 acres) and river estuaries.

Amathay-Vésigneux (French pronunciation: [amatɛ veziɲø]) is a commune in the Doubs department in the Bourgogne-Franche-Comté region in eastern France.

== Population ==
Historical population
Year	Pop.	±% p.a.
1968	192	—
1975	153	−3.19%
1982	141	−1.16%
1990	149	+0.69%
1999	129	−1.59%
2007	136	+0.66%
2012	150	+1.98%
2017	163	+1.68%
2023	175	+1.19%
Source: INSEE

== See also ==
- Communes of the Doubs department
