= Arc-sous-Cicon =

- Commune
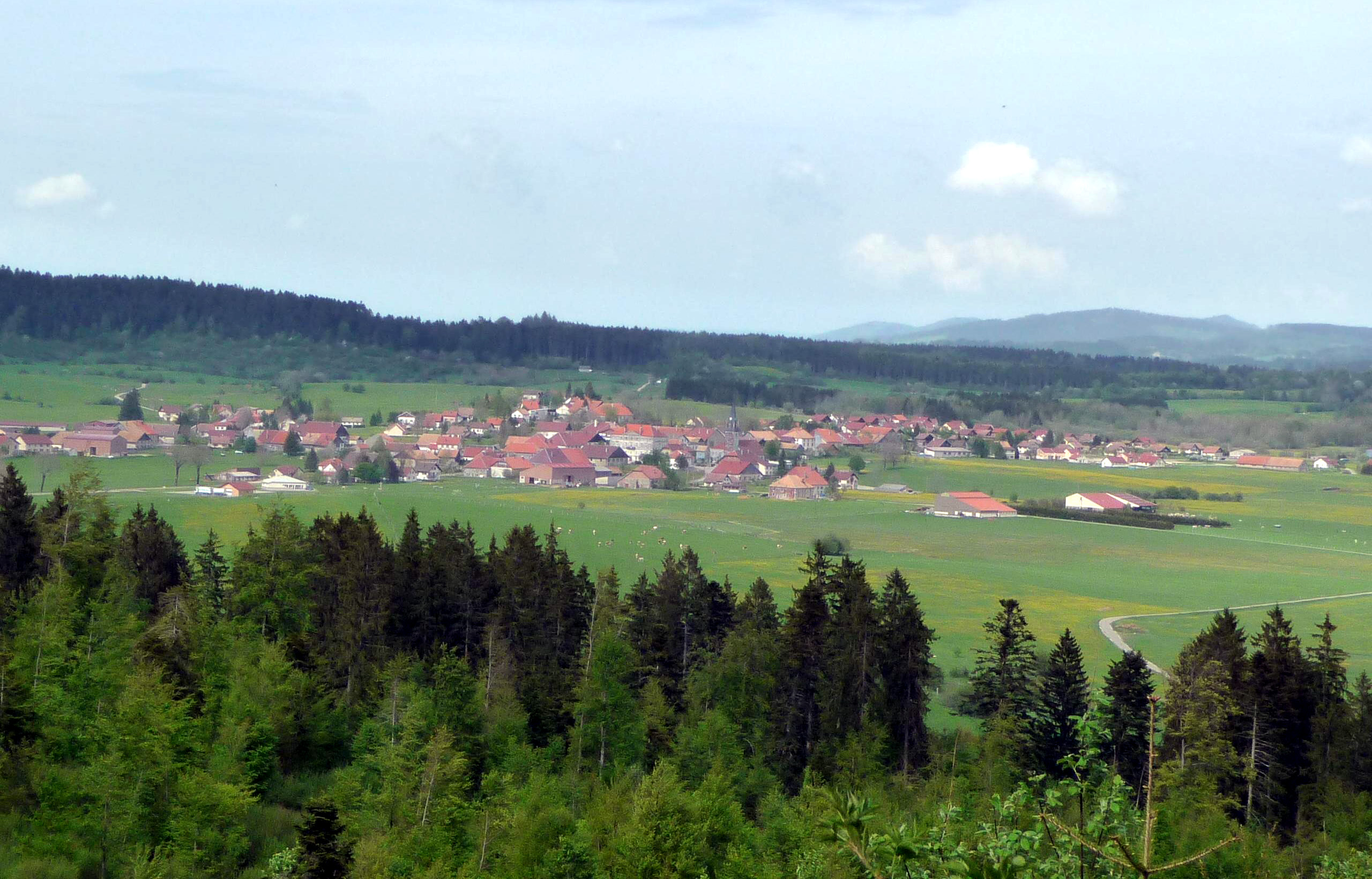
- A general view of Arc-sous-Cicon

- Flag
- Location of Arc-sous-Cicon
- Location within France Location within Bourgogne-Franche-Comté
- Coordinates: 47°03′12″N 6°22′55″E
- Country: France
- Region: Bourgogne-Franche-Comté
- Department: Doubs
- Arrondissement: Pontarlier
- Canton: Ornans
- Intercommunality: CC entre Doubs et Loue

Government
  - Mayor (2020–2026): Benoit Viennet
- Area^{1}: 28.49 km^{2} (11.00 sq mi)
- Highest elevation: 1,140 m (3,740 ft)
- Lowest elevation: 776 m (2,546 ft)
- Population (2023): 768
  - Density: 27.0/km^{2} (69.8/sq mi)
- Time zone: UTC+01:00 (CET)
  - Summer (DST): UTC+02:00 (CEST)
- INSEE/Postal code: 25025 /25520
- ^{1} French Land Register data, which excludes lakes, ponds, glaciers > 1 km^{2} (0.386 sq mi or 247 acres) and river estuaries.

Arc-sous-Cicon (French pronunciation: [aʁk su sikɔ̃]; Arpitan: En-Â) is a commune in the Doubs department in the Bourgogne-Franche-Comté region in eastern France.

== Population ==
Historical population
Year	Pop.	±% p.a.
1968	648	—
1975	598	−1.14%
1982	604	+0.14%
1990	507	−2.16%
1999	532	+0.54%
2007	613	+1.79%
2012	663	+1.58%
2017	665	+0.06%
2023	768	+2.43%
Source: INSEE

== See also ==
- Communes of the Doubs department
