= Lizine =

- Commune
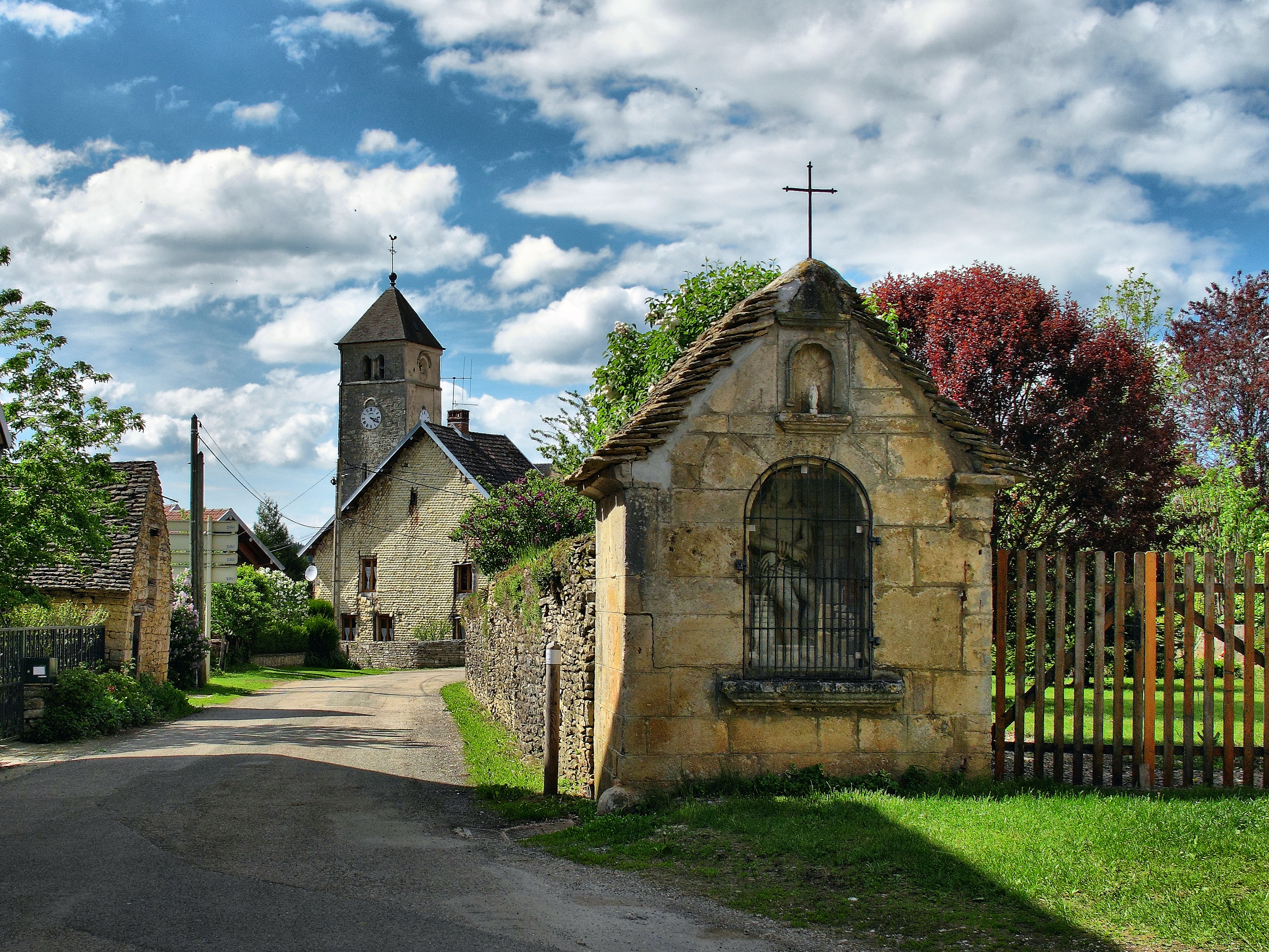
- The church in Lizine
- Location of Lizine
- Location within France Location within Bourgogne-Franche-Comté
- Coordinates: 47°03′25″N 5°59′42″E
- Country: France
- Region: Bourgogne-Franche-Comté
- Department: Doubs
- Arrondissement: Besançon
- Canton: Ornans
- Intercommunality: Loue-Lison

Government
  - Mayor (2020–2026): Pascal Gosse
- Area^{1}: 7.33 km^{2} (2.83 sq mi)
- Highest elevation: 508 m (1,667 ft)
- Lowest elevation: 290 m (950 ft)
- Population (2023): 87
  - Density: 12/km^{2} (31/sq mi)
- Time zone: UTC+01:00 (CET)
  - Summer (DST): UTC+02:00 (CEST)
- INSEE/Postal code: 25338 /25330
- ^{1} French Land Register data, which excludes lakes, ponds, glaciers > 1 km^{2} (0.386 sq mi or 247 acres) and river estuaries.

Lizine (French pronunciation: [lizin]) is a commune in the Doubs department in the Bourgogne-Franche-Comté region in eastern France.

== Geography ==
The village is built on a plateau between the Loue and the Lison rivers, with a superb view of both valleys.

== Population ==
Historical population
Year	Pop.	±% p.a.
1968	84	—
1975	53	−6.37%
1982	68	+3.62%
1990	73	+0.89%
1999	87	+1.97%
2007	95	+1.11%
2012	83	−2.66%
2017	92	+2.08%
2023	87	−0.93%
Source: INSEE

== See also ==
- Communes of the Doubs department
