= Reugney =

- Commune
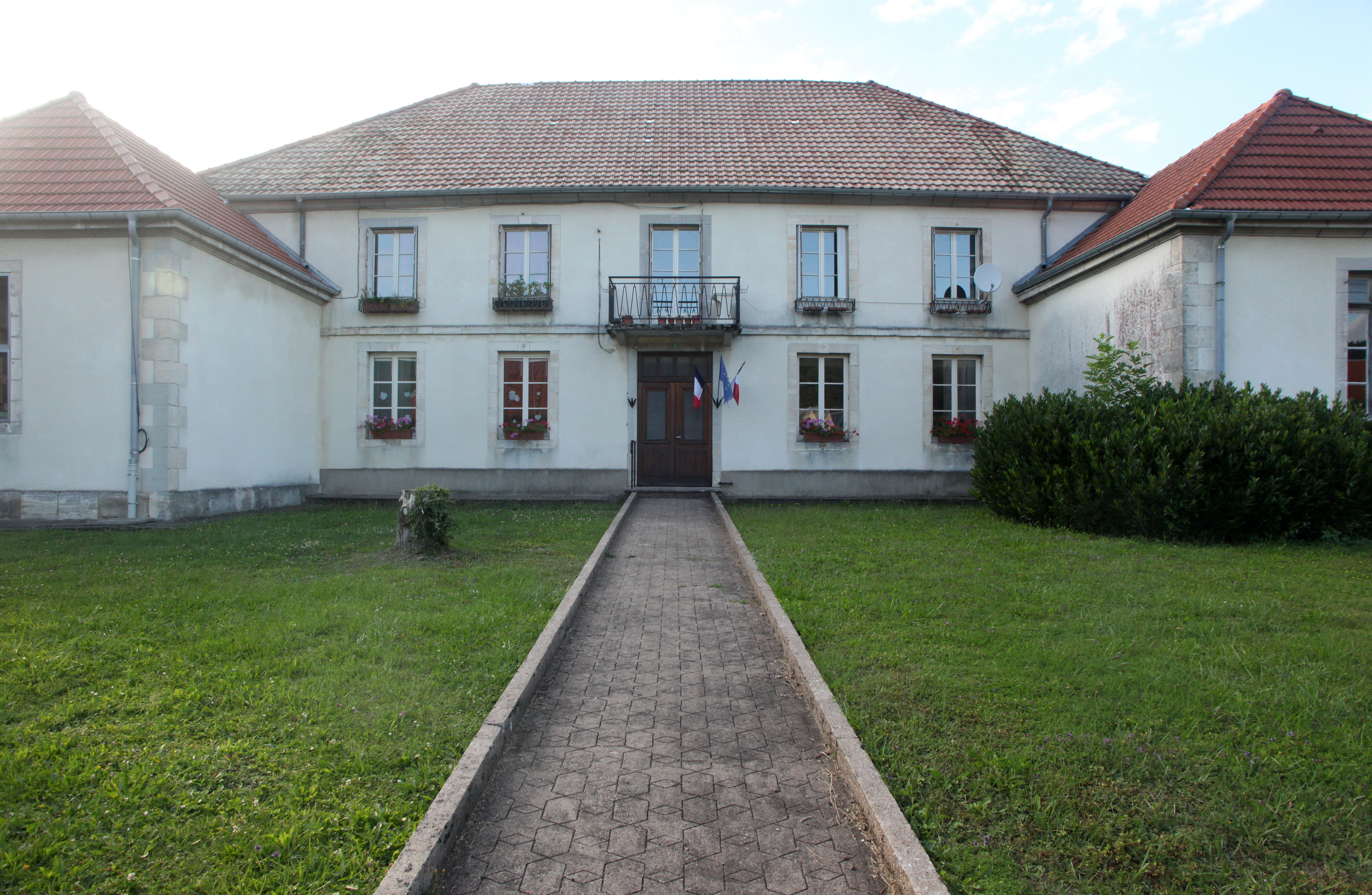
- The town hall in Reugney
- Location of Reugney
- Location within France Location within Bourgogne-Franche-Comté
- Coordinates: 47°00′48″N 6°09′07″E
- Country: France
- Region: Bourgogne-Franche-Comté
- Department: Doubs
- Arrondissement: Besançon
- Canton: Ornans
- Intercommunality: Loue-Lison

Government
  - Mayor (2020–2026): Dominique Bérion
- Area^{1}: 8.19 km^{2} (3.16 sq mi)
- Highest elevation: 910 m (2,990 ft)
- Lowest elevation: 649 m (2,129 ft)
- Population (2023): 268
  - Density: 32.7/km^{2} (84.8/sq mi)
- Time zone: UTC+01:00 (CET)
  - Summer (DST): UTC+02:00 (CEST)
- INSEE/Postal code: 25489 /25330
- ^{1} French Land Register data, which excludes lakes, ponds, glaciers > 1 km^{2} (0.386 sq mi or 247 acres) and river estuaries.

Reugney (French pronunciation: [ʁøɲɛ]) is a commune in the Doubs department in the Bourgogne-Franche-Comté region in eastern France.

== Population ==
Historical population
Year	Pop.	±% p.a.
1968	212	—
1975	194	−1.26%
1982	193	−0.07%
1990	186	−0.46%
1999	230	+2.39%
2007	310	+3.80%
2012	309	−0.06%
2017	305	−0.26%
2023	268	−2.13%
Source: INSEE

== See also ==
- Communes of the Doubs department
