= Renédale =

- Commune
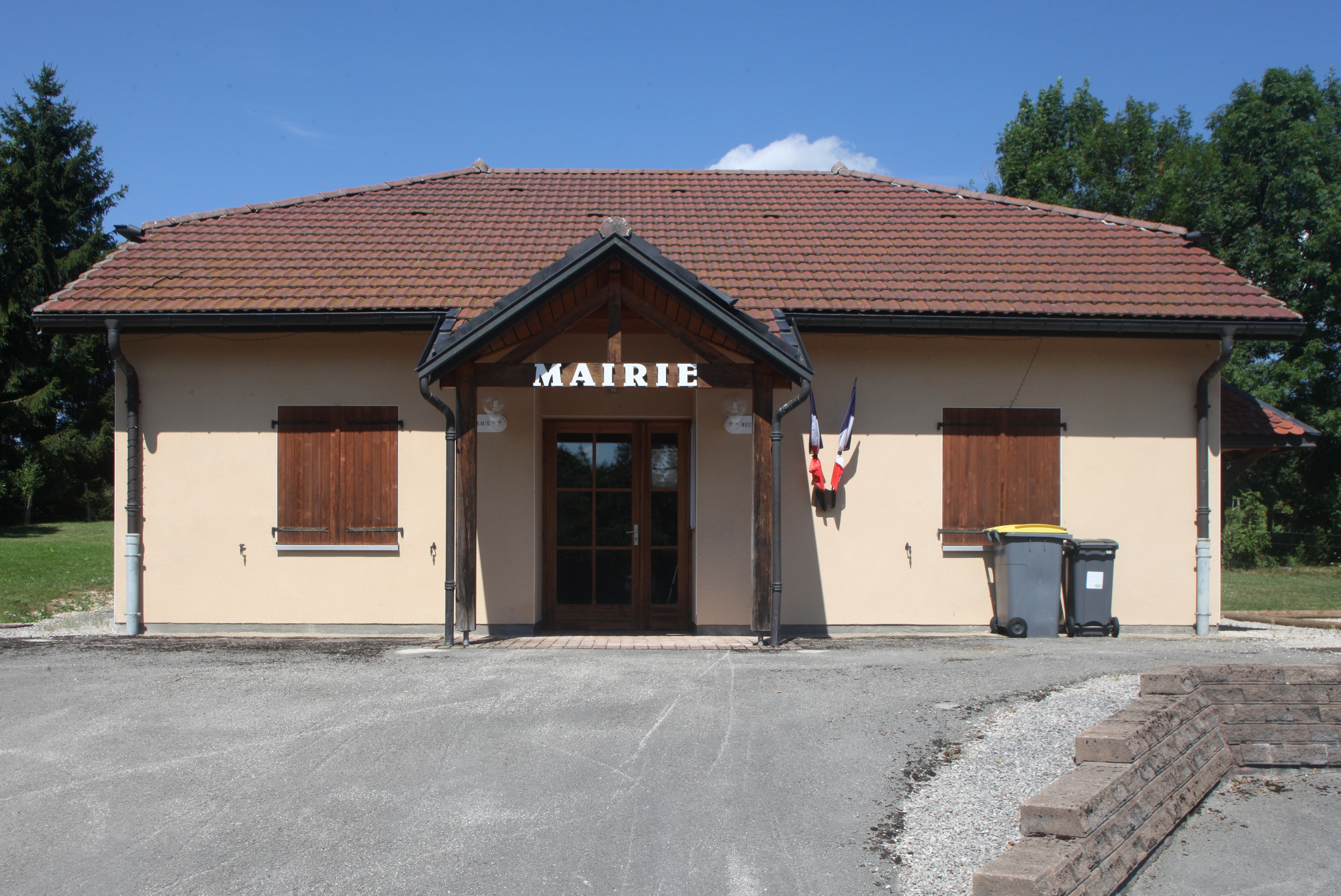
- The town hall in Renédale
- Location of Renédale
- Location within France Location within Bourgogne-Franche-Comté
- Coordinates: 47°01′07″N 6°16′42″E
- Country: France
- Region: Bourgogne-Franche-Comté
- Department: Doubs
- Arrondissement: Pontarlier
- Canton: Ornans
- Intercommunality: CC entre Doubs et Loue

Government
  - Mayor (2020–2026): Gilles Renaud
- Area^{1}: 2.88 km^{2} (1.11 sq mi)
- Highest elevation: 768 m (2,520 ft)
- Lowest elevation: 670 m (2,200 ft)
- Population (2023): 41
  - Density: 14/km^{2} (37/sq mi)
- Time zone: UTC+01:00 (CET)
  - Summer (DST): UTC+02:00 (CEST)
- INSEE/Postal code: 25487 /25520
- ^{1} French Land Register data, which excludes lakes, ponds, glaciers > 1 km^{2} (0.386 sq mi or 247 acres) and river estuaries.

Renédale (French pronunciation: [ʁənedal]) is a commune in the Doubs department in the Bourgogne-Franche-Comté region in eastern France.

== Population ==
Historical population
Year	Pop.	±% p.a.
1968	40	—
1975	40	+0.00%
1982	32	−3.14%
1990	27	−2.10%
1999	30	+1.18%
2007	35	+1.95%
2012	38	+1.66%
2017	40	+1.03%
2023	41	+0.41%
Source: INSEE

== See also ==
- Communes of the Doubs department
