= Gevresin =

- Commune
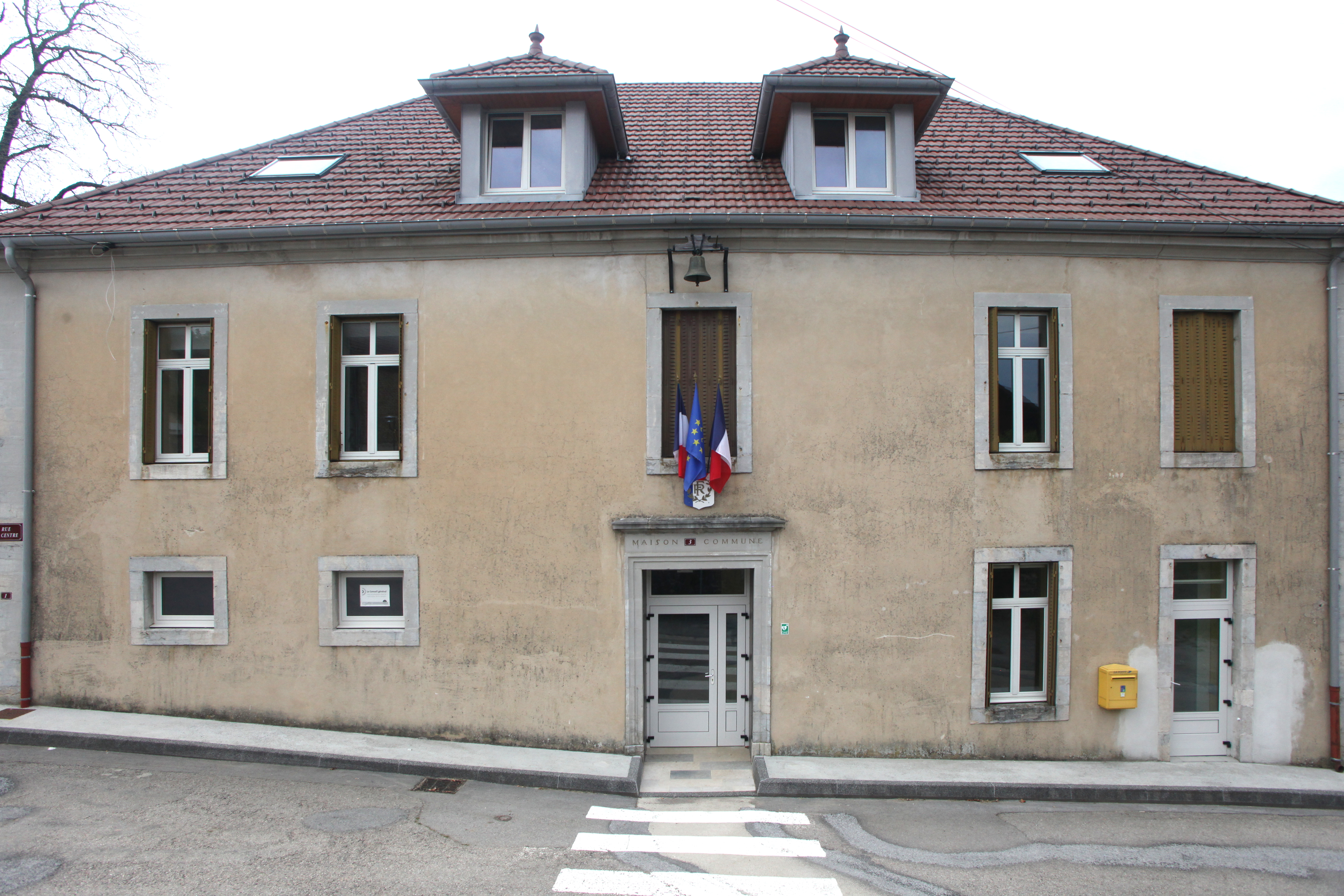
- The town hall in Gevresin
- Location of Gevresin
- Location within France Location within Bourgogne-Franche-Comté
- Coordinates: 46°58′05″N 6°02′34″E
- Country: France
- Region: Bourgogne-Franche-Comté
- Department: Doubs
- Arrondissement: Besançon
- Canton: Ornans
- Intercommunality: Altitude 800

Government
  - Mayor (2020–2026): Louis Bourgeois
- Area^{1}: 6.91 km^{2} (2.67 sq mi)
- Highest elevation: 783 m (2,569 ft)
- Lowest elevation: 650 m (2,130 ft)
- Population (2023): 158
  - Density: 22.9/km^{2} (59.2/sq mi)
- Time zone: UTC+01:00 (CET)
  - Summer (DST): UTC+02:00 (CEST)
- INSEE/Postal code: 25270 /25270
- ^{1} French Land Register data, which excludes lakes, ponds, glaciers > 1 km^{2} (0.386 sq mi or 247 acres) and river estuaries.

Gevresin (French pronunciation: [ʒəvʁəzɛ̃]) is a commune in the Doubs department in the region of Bourgogne-Franche-Comté in eastern France.

== Population ==
Historical population
Year	Pop.	±% p.a.
1968	110	—
1975	101	−1.21%
1982	97	−0.58%
1990	106	+1.12%
1999	107	+0.10%
2007	115	+0.91%
2012	120	+0.85%
2017	118	−0.34%
2023	158	+4.99%
Source: INSEE

== See also ==
- Communes of the Doubs department
