= Lavans-Vuillafans =

- Commune
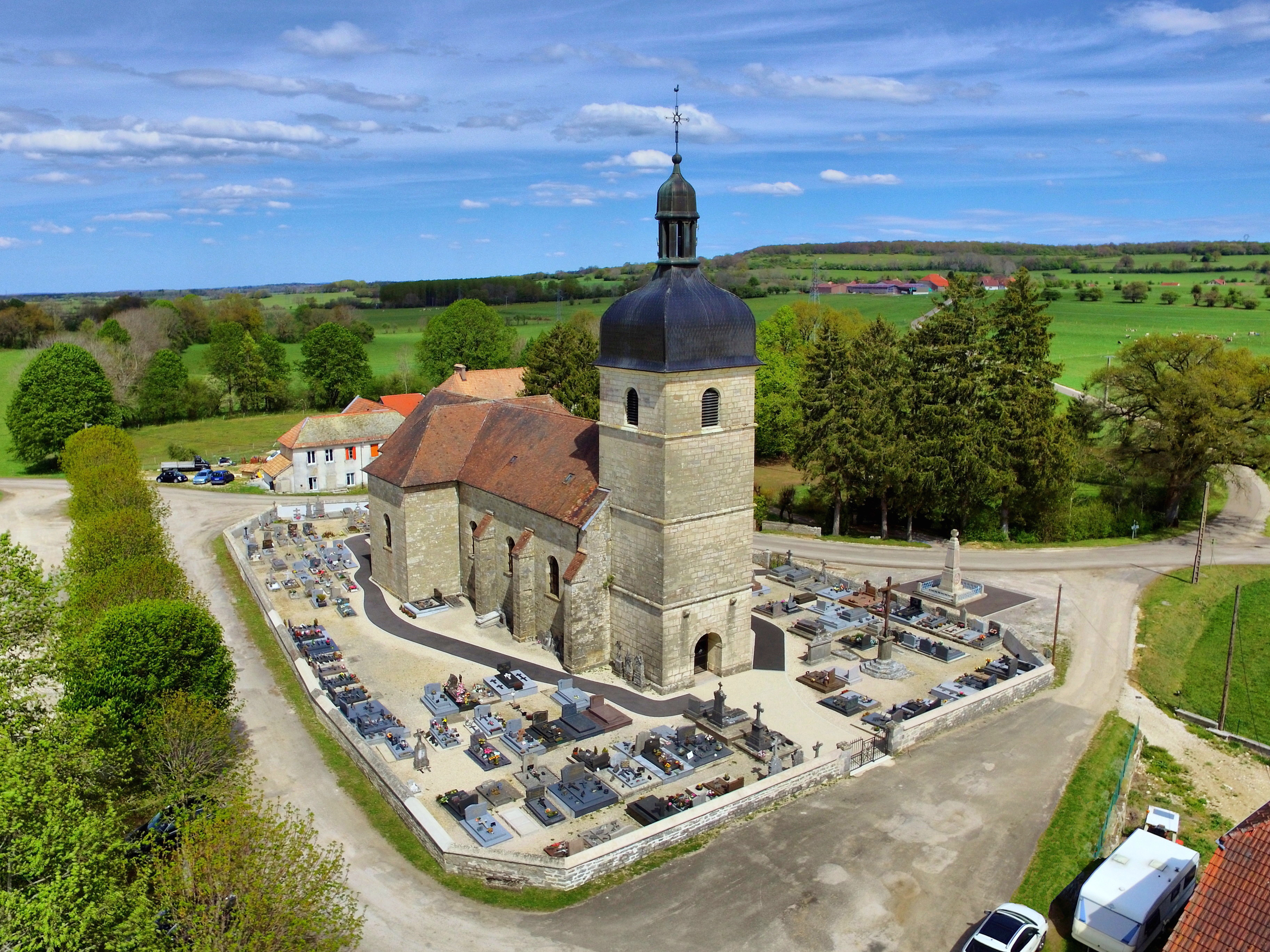
- The church in La Bareche
- Location of Lavans-Vuillafans
- Location within France Location within Bourgogne-Franche-Comté
- Coordinates: 47°05′14″N 6°14′42″E
- Country: France
- Region: Bourgogne-Franche-Comté
- Department: Doubs
- Arrondissement: Besançon
- Canton: Ornans

Government
  - Mayor (2020–2026): Véronique Keller
- Area^{1}: 10.16 km^{2} (3.92 sq mi)
- Highest elevation: 767 m (2,516 ft)
- Lowest elevation: 570 m (1,870 ft)
- Population (2023): 232
  - Density: 22.8/km^{2} (59.1/sq mi)
- Time zone: UTC+01:00 (CET)
  - Summer (DST): UTC+02:00 (CEST)
- INSEE/Postal code: 25331 /25580
- ^{1} French Land Register data, which excludes lakes, ponds, glaciers > 1 km^{2} (0.386 sq mi or 247 acres) and river estuaries.

Lavans-Vuillafans (french pronunciation: [lavɑ̃ vijafɑ̃]) is a commune in the Doubs department in the Bourgogne-Franche-Comté region in eastern France.

== Population ==
Historical population
Year	Pop.	±% p.a.
1968	192	—
1975	179	−1.00%
1982	161	−1.50%
1990	158	−0.23%
1999	182	+1.58%
2007	209	+1.74%
2012	224	+1.40%
2017	238	+1.22%
2023	232	−0.42%
Source: INSEE

== See also ==
- Communes of the Doubs department
