= Chantrans =

- Commune
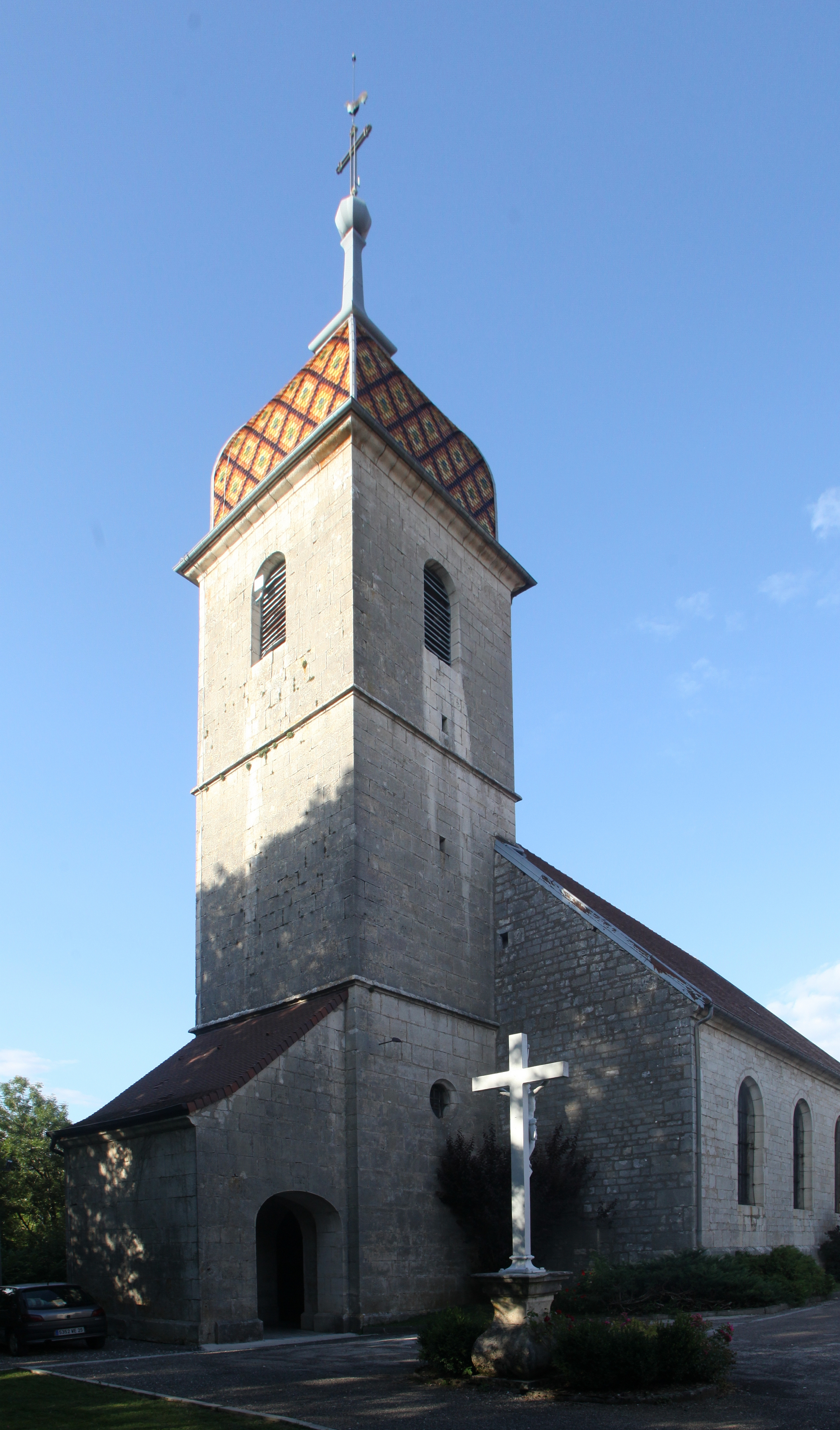
- The church in Chantrans

- Coat of arms
- Location of Chantrans
- Location within France Location within Bourgogne-Franche-Comté
- Coordinates: 47°02′39″N 6°09′02″E
- Country: France
- Region: Bourgogne-Franche-Comté
- Department: Doubs
- Arrondissement: Besançon
- Canton: Ornans

Government
  - Mayor (2020–2026): Catherine Grandjacquet
- Area^{1}: 14.31 km^{2} (5.53 sq mi)
- Highest elevation: 693 m (2,274 ft)
- Lowest elevation: 430 m (1,410 ft)
- Population (2023): 381
  - Density: 26.6/km^{2} (69.0/sq mi)
- Time zone: UTC+01:00 (CET)
  - Summer (DST): UTC+02:00 (CEST)
- INSEE/Postal code: 25120 /25330
- ^{1} French Land Register data, which excludes lakes, ponds, glaciers > 1 km^{2} (0.386 sq mi or 247 acres) and river estuaries.

Chantrans (French pronunciation: [ʃɑ̃tʁɑ̃]) is a commune in the Doubs department in the Bourgogne-Franche-Comté region in eastern France.

== Population ==
Historical population
Year	Pop.	±% p.a.
1968	271	—
1975	240	−1.72%
1982	292	+2.84%
1990	298	+0.25%
1999	319	+0.76%
2007	383	+2.31%
2012	428	+2.25%
2017	405	−1.10%
2023	381	−1.01%
Source: INSEE

== See also ==
- Communes of the Doubs department
