= Cademène =

- Commune
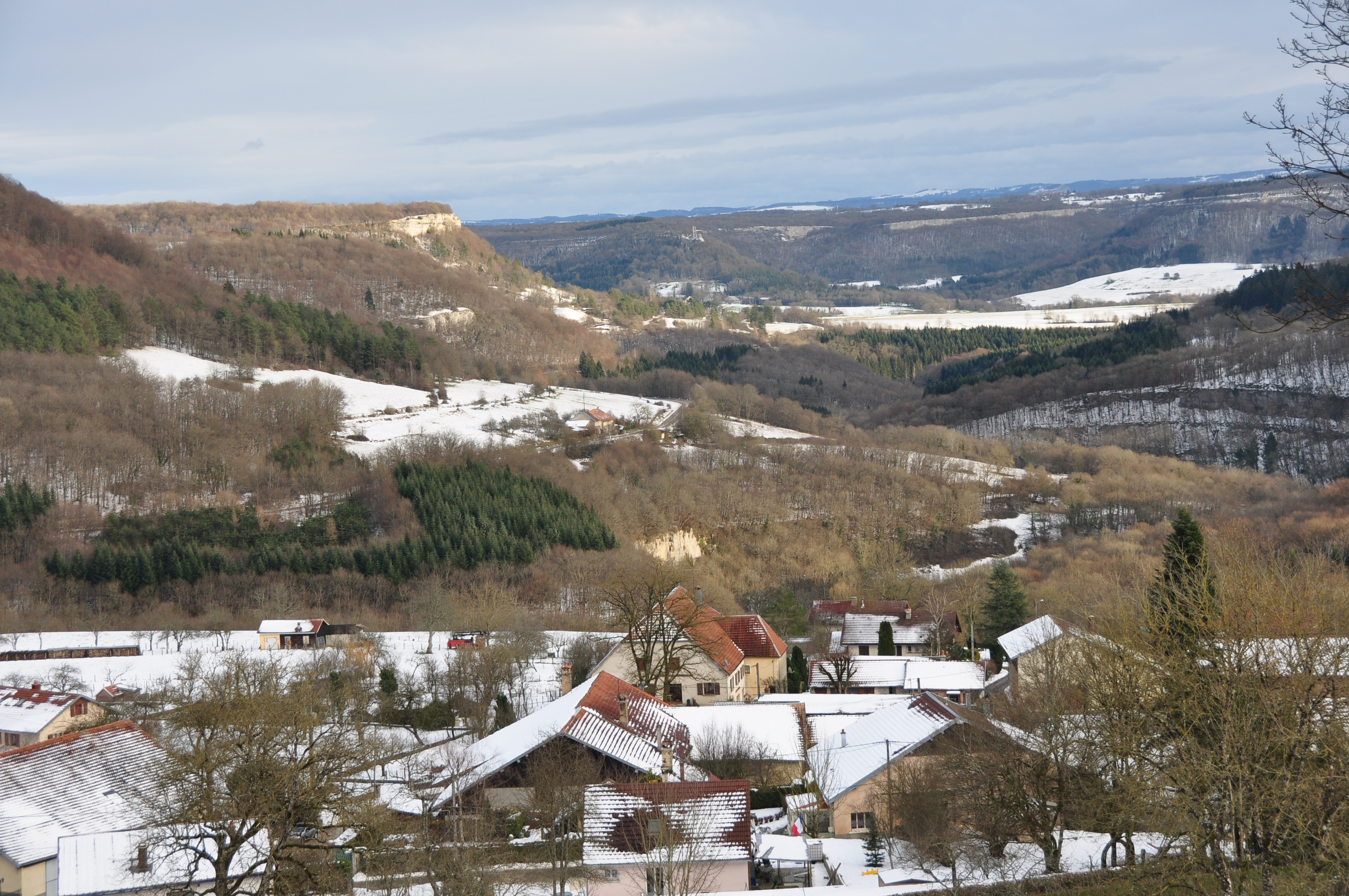
- A general view of Cademène
- Location of Cademène
- Location within France Location within Bourgogne-Franche-Comté
- Coordinates: 47°06′05″N 6°01′42″E
- Country: France
- Region: Bourgogne-Franche-Comté
- Department: Doubs
- Arrondissement: Besançon
- Canton: Ornans

Government
  - Mayor (2022–2026): Fabienne Arnoux
- Area^{1}: 3.39 km^{2} (1.31 sq mi)
- Highest elevation: 515 m (1,690 ft)
- Lowest elevation: 295 m (968 ft)
- Population (2023): 66
  - Density: 19/km^{2} (50/sq mi)
- Time zone: UTC+01:00 (CET)
  - Summer (DST): UTC+02:00 (CEST)
- INSEE/Postal code: 25106 /25290
- ^{1} French Land Register data, which excludes lakes, ponds, glaciers > 1 km^{2} (0.386 sq mi or 247 acres) and river estuaries.

Cademène (French pronunciation: [kadmɛn]) is a commune in the Doubs department in the Bourgogne-Franche-Comté region in eastern France.

== Population ==
Historical population
Year	Pop.	±% p.a.
1968	45	—
1975	42	−0.98%
1982	50	+2.52%
1990	78	+5.72%
1999	82	+0.56%
2007	86	+0.60%
2012	84	−0.47%
2017	71	−3.31%
2023	66	−1.21%
Source: INSEE

== See also ==
- Communes of the Doubs department
