= Échevannes, Doubs =

Échevannes
- Commune
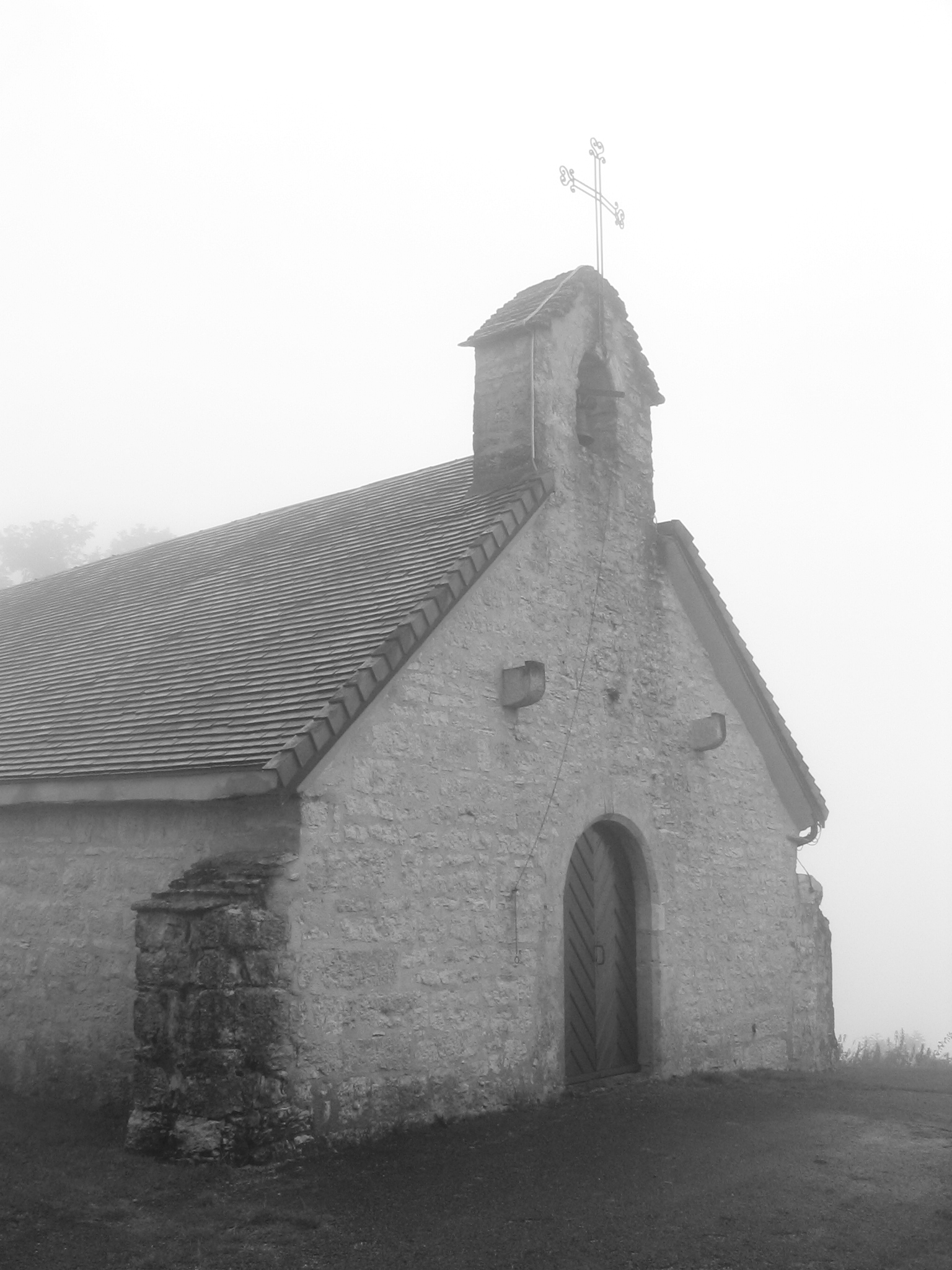
- The chapel in Échevannes
- Location of Échevannes
- Location within France Location within Bourgogne-Franche-Comté
- Coordinates: 47°04′29″N 6°13′54″E
- Country: France
- Region: Bourgogne-Franche-Comté
- Department: Doubs
- Arrondissement: Besançon
- Canton: Ornans

Government
  - Mayor (2020–2026): Danielle Pitavy
- Area^{1}: 5.23 km^{2} (2.02 sq mi)
- Highest elevation: 747 m (2,451 ft)
- Lowest elevation: 550 m (1,800 ft)
- Population (2023): 88
  - Density: 17/km^{2} (44/sq mi)
- Time zone: UTC+01:00 (CET)
  - Summer (DST): UTC+02:00 (CEST)
- INSEE/Postal code: 25211 /25580
- ^{1} French Land Register data, which excludes lakes, ponds, glaciers > 1 km^{2} (0.386 sq mi or 247 acres) and river estuaries.

Échevannes (French pronunciation: [eʃvan]) is a commune in the Doubs department in the Bourgogne-Franche-Comté region in eastern France.

== Population ==
Historical population
Year	Pop.	±% p.a.
1968	45	—
1975	49	+1.22%
1982	80	+7.25%
1990	71	−1.48%
1999	64	−1.15%
2007	85	+3.61%
2012	82	−0.72%
2017	89	+1.65%
2023	88	−0.19%
Source: INSEE

== See also ==
- Communes of the Doubs department
