= Miss Franche-Comté =

Beauty contest

- Type: Beauty pageant
- Headquarters: Franche-Comté, France
- Members: Miss France
- Official language: French
- Regional director: Anne-Laure Vouillot

Miss Franche-Comté is a French beauty pageant which selects a representative for the Miss France national competition from the region of Franche-Comté. Women representing the region under various different titles have competed at Miss France since 1926, although the Miss Franche-Comté title was not used regularly until 1974.

The current Miss Franche-Comté is Emma Ninot, who was crowned Miss Franche-Comté 2026 on 11 September 2026. Two women from Franche-Comté have been crowned Miss France:

- Roberte Cusey, who was crowned Miss France 1927, competing as Miss Jura
- Patricia Barzyk, who was crowned Miss France 1980, competing as Miss Jura, following the resignation of the original winner

== Results summary ==
- Miss France: Roberte Cusey (1926; Miss Jura)
- 1st Runner-Up: Marina Crouet (1961); Dominique Pasquier (1969; Miss Jura); Patricia Barzyk (1979; Miss Jura; later Miss France); Martine Phillips (1981)
- 2nd Runner-Up: Marlène Mourreau (1985); Élodie Couffin (2002); Lauralyne Demesmay (2018); Marion Navarro (2022)
- 3rd Runner-Up: Brigitte Vuillemin (1969); Ghislaine Bochard (1970; Miss Jura); Pascale Meotti (1988)
- 5th Runner-Up: Rolande Maroc (1980)
- Top 12/Top 15: Astrid Guillemin (1987); Karine Paulin (1990); Caroline Sery (2004); Camille Duban (2013)

== Gallery ==
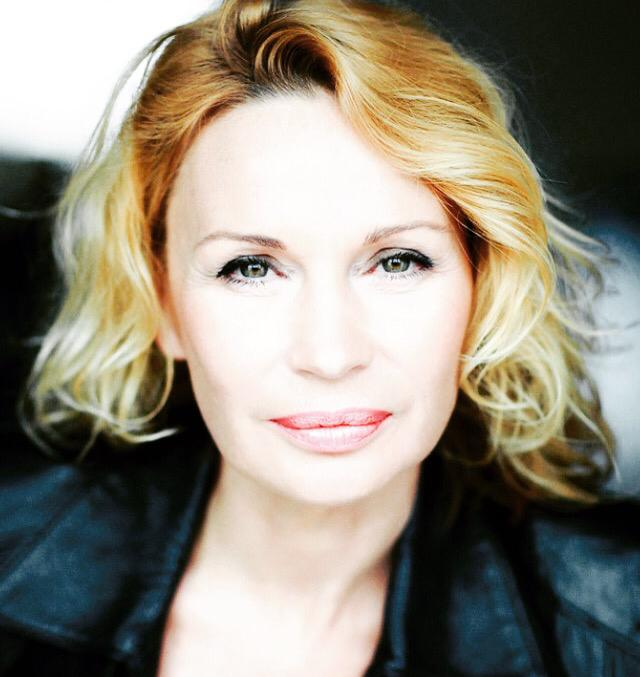
Miss Franche-Comté 1985
Marlène Mourreau

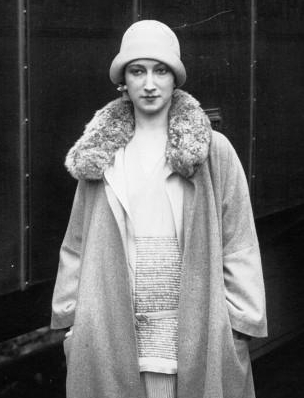
Miss Jura 1926 and Miss France 1927
Roberte Cusey

== Titleholders ==
Year	Name	Age (Note: Ages at the time of Miss France)	Height	Hometown	Miss France placement	Notes
2026	Emma Ninot	21	1.75 m (5 ft 9 in)	Laire	TBD	
2025	Jade Cholley	19	1.77 m (5 ft 9 1/2 in)	Saint-Vit		
2024	Manon Le Maou	28	1.74 m (5 ft 8 1/2 in)	Villers-Saint-Martin		
2023	Sonia Coutant	24	1.72 m (5 ft 7 1/2 in)	Champagnole		
2022	Marion Navarro	19	1.73 m (5 ft 8 in)	Baume-les-Dames	2nd Runner-Up	
2021	Julie Cretin	21	1.70 m (5 ft 7 in)	Bouverans		
2020	Anastasia Salvi	23	1.70 m (5 ft 7 in)	Mouthe	Did not compete	Salvi was required by pageant organisers to renounce the title two days after winning it, after it emerged that she had participated in a suggestive photoshoot in the past. She was replaced by Gandelin, her first runner-up.
2020	Coralie Gandelin	23	1.72 m (5 ft 7 1/2 in)	La Chailleuse		Salvi was required by pageant organisers to renounce the title two days after winning it, after it emerged that she had participated in a suggestive photoshoot in the past. She was replaced by Gandelin, her first runner-up.
2019	Solène Bernardin	23	1.77 m (5 ft 9 1/2 in)	Granges-la-Ville		
2018	Lauralyne Demesmay	18	1.80 m (5 ft 11 in)	Devecey	2nd Runner-Up	
2017	Mathilde Klinguer	22	1.77 m (5 ft 9 1/2 in)	Pont-de-Roide-Vermondans		
2016	Mélissa Nourry	20	1.71 m (5 ft 7 1/2 in)	Pirey		
2015	Alizée Vannier	19	1.72 m (5 ft 7 1/2 in)	Pelousey		Vannier is the sister of Andréa Vannier, Miss Franche-Comté 2011.
2014	Anne-Mathilde Cali	24	1.73 m (5 ft 8 in)	Besançon		
2013	Camille Duban	19	1.73 m (5 ft 8 in)	Gray	Top 12	
2012	Charlène Michaut	24	1.72 m (5 ft 7 1/2 in)	Allenjoie		
2011	Andréa Vannier	19	1.76 m (5 ft 9 1/2 in)	Pelousey		Vannier is the sister of Alizée Vannier, Miss Franche-Comté 2015.
2010	Sabrina Halm	22	1.70 m (5 ft 7 in)	Mathay		
2009	Estelle Diop	19	1.80 m (5 ft 11 in)	Belfort		
2008	Johanne Kervella	23	1.70 m (5 ft 7 in)	Chalezeule		
2007	Laure Amourette			Laviron		
2006	Noémie Marguet	19	1.72 m (5 ft 7 1/2 in)	Saint-Vit		
2005	Magalie Thierry	18	1.78 m (5 ft 10 in)	Froideconche		Top 16 at Miss Earth 2009
2004	Caroline Sery			Montigny-lès-Vesoul	Top 12	
2003	Élodie Serreau					
2002	Élodie Couffin	18	1.74 m (5 ft 8 1/2 in)	Belfort	2nd Runner-Up	Top 12 at Miss International 2002
2001	Anne-Laure Vouillot			Longeville		
2000	Laetitia Godard			Vaire-Arcier		
1999	Mélanie Ott	19	1.73 m (5 ft 8 in)	Rigny		
1998	Laetitia Creusot	20	1.81 m (5 ft 11 1/2 in)	Couthenans		
1997	Sabrina Barbeaux	19	1.70 m (5 ft 7 in)			
1996	Delphine Pequignet			Belfort		
1995	Maryline Gogniat			Bavans		
1994	Delphine Petitjean			Le Pin		
1993	Valérie Jeannin					
1992	Isabelle Chagnot					
1991	Sylvie Pentecôte-Coton					
1990	Karine Paulin			Besançon	Top 12	
1989	Laurence Thierry					
1988	Pascale Meotti				3rd Runner-Up	Competed at Miss Universe 1989
1987	Astrid Guillemin				Top 12	
1986	Catherine Peroni					
1985	Marlène Mourreau	16			2nd Runner-Up	
1984	Rachel Pardonnet					
1983	Isabelle Huttges			Cravanche		
1982	Laurence Dore					
1981	Martine Phillips			Audincourt	1st Runner-Up	
1980	Rolande Maroc				5th Runner-Up	
1979	Catherine Guilleux					
1978	Andrée Ringenbach					
1977	Françoise Baysang					
1976	Jocelyne Mercier			Saint-Claude		
1975	Isabelle Crouvoissier					
1974	Annick Recroix					
1970	Danielle Lapouge					
1969	Brigitte Vuillemin				3rd Runner-Up	
1961	Marina Crouet				1st Runner-Up	

=== Miss Besançon ===
In 1970, the city of Besançon competed separately under the title Miss Besançon. The same title has later been used by the city for a separate beauty pageant, not affiliated with Miss France, up until 2015.

Year	Name	Age	Height	Hometown	Miss France placement	Notes
1970	Françoise Maître					

=== Miss Jura ===
In 1926, 1969, 1991, and several years in the 1970s, the department of Jura competed separately under the title Miss Jura.

Year	Name	Age	Height	Hometown	Miss France placement	Notes
1991	Isabelle Barbier					
1979	Patricia Barzyk	16		Arbouans	1st Runner-Up (later Miss France 1980)	Barzyk was originally the first runner-up, but took over as Miss France 1980 after the original winner resigned the title three days after winning, for personal reasons. Barzyk is the mother of Sarah Barzyk, crowned Miss Paris 2008.
1977	Maryline Carvacho					
1976	Claude Prabel					
1970	Ghislaine Bochard				3rd Runner-Up	
1969	Dominique Pasquier				1st Runner-Up	
1926	Roberte Cusey			Le Deschaux	Miss France 1927	

=== Miss Territoire de Belfort ===
For several years in the 1970s, 1980s, and 1990s, the department of Territoire de Belfort competed separately under the title Miss Territoire de Belfort.

Year	Name	Age	Height	Hometown	Miss France placement	Notes
1990	Delphine Mougenot					
1989	Nancy Malcuit					
1988	Delphine Stutz					
1986	Virginie Simon					
1985	Evelyne Ringenbach					
1977	Claudine Garnier					
1970	Françoise Carnovali					
