= Étrabonne =

- Commune
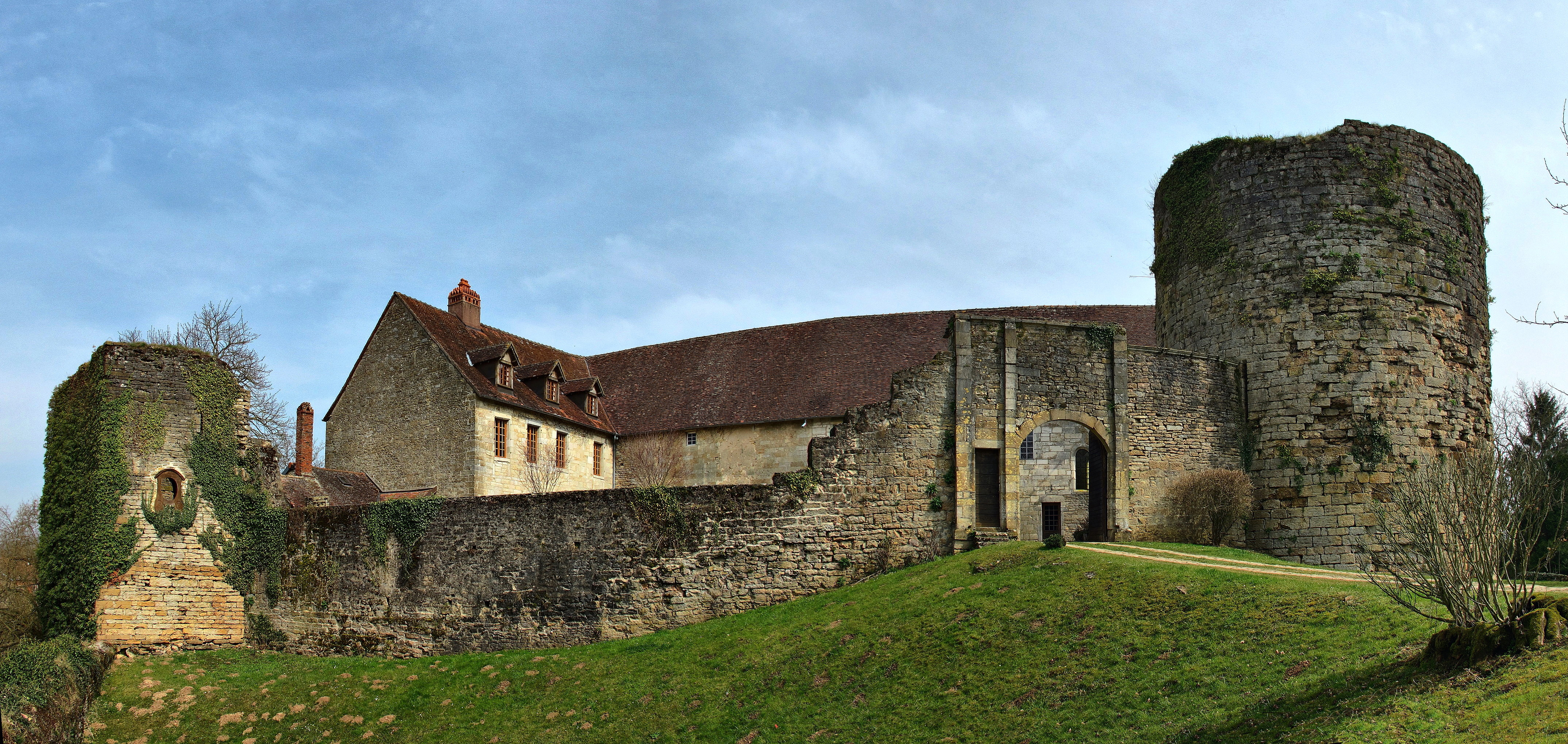
- Chateau

- Coat of arms
- Location of Étrabonne
- Location within France Location within Bourgogne-Franche-Comté
- Coordinates: 47°14′05″N 5°44′36″E
- Country: France
- Region: Bourgogne-Franche-Comté
- Department: Doubs
- Arrondissement: Besançon
- Canton: Saint-Vit

Government
  - Mayor (2020–2026): Alexandra Pharisat
- Area^{1}: 5.52 km^{2} (2.13 sq mi)
- Highest elevation: 340 m (1,120 ft)
- Lowest elevation: 234 m (768 ft)
- Population (2023): 182
  - Density: 33.0/km^{2} (85.4/sq mi)
- Time zone: UTC+01:00 (CET)
  - Summer (DST): UTC+02:00 (CEST)
- INSEE/Postal code: 25225 /25170
- ^{1} French Land Register data, which excludes lakes, ponds, glaciers > 1 km^{2} (0.386 sq mi or 247 acres) and river estuaries.

Étrabonne (French pronunciation: [etʁabɔn]) is a commune in the Doubs department in the Bourgogne-Franche-Comté region in eastern France.

== Town planning ==
=== Typology ===
Étrabonne is a rural municipality, because it is part of the municipalities with little or very little density, within the meaning of the municipal density grid of INSEE.

In addition, the municipality is part of the attraction area of Besançon, of which it is a municipality in the crown. This area, which includes 312 municipalities, is categorized in areas of 200,000 to less than 700,000 inhabitants.

=== Land use ===
The zoning of the municipality, as reflected in the database European occupation biophysical soil Corine Land Cover (CLC), is marked by the importance of the agricultural land (73.5% in 2018), a proportion identical to that of 1990 (73.5%). The detailed breakdown in 2018 is as follows:

- arable land (44.3%)
- forests (26.5%)
- meadows (20%)
- heterogeneous agricultural areas (9.2%)

The IGN also provides an online tool to compare the evolution over time of land use in the municipality (or in territories at different scales). Several eras are accessible as aerial maps or photos: the Cassini map (18^{th} century), the map of Staff (1820–1866) and the current period (1950 to present).

== Toponymy ==
The place was designated as Strabunne in 1166; Strabona in 1223; Estrabeigne in 1266 and Estrabonne in 1307.

== Policy and Administration ==
=== Administrative and electoral attachments ===
The town is located in the district of Besançon in the department of Doubs. For the election of deputies, it has been part of the first district of Doubs since 1986.

Since 1801, it was part of the canton of Audeux. As part of the 2014 cantonal redistribution in France, the town is now attached to the canton of Saint-Vit.

=== Intercommunality ===
The municipality was a member of the small community of municipalities of the Val Saint-Vitois, created at the end of 2001.

Within the framework of the provisions of the law on the new territorial organization of the Republic (NOTRe Law) of August 7, 2015, which provides that public inter-municipal cooperation establishments (EPCI) with their own taxation must have a minimum of 15,000 inhabitants (and 5,000 inhabitants in mountain areas), the prefecture of Doubs has adopted the new departmental inter-municipal cooperation plan (SDCI) which provides in particular for the break-up of this community of communes and the attachment of some of its communes to the community of communes of Val-de-Marne, others to Grand Besançon Métropole, and two, finally, to the community of communes of Loue-Lison.

== Places and monuments ==
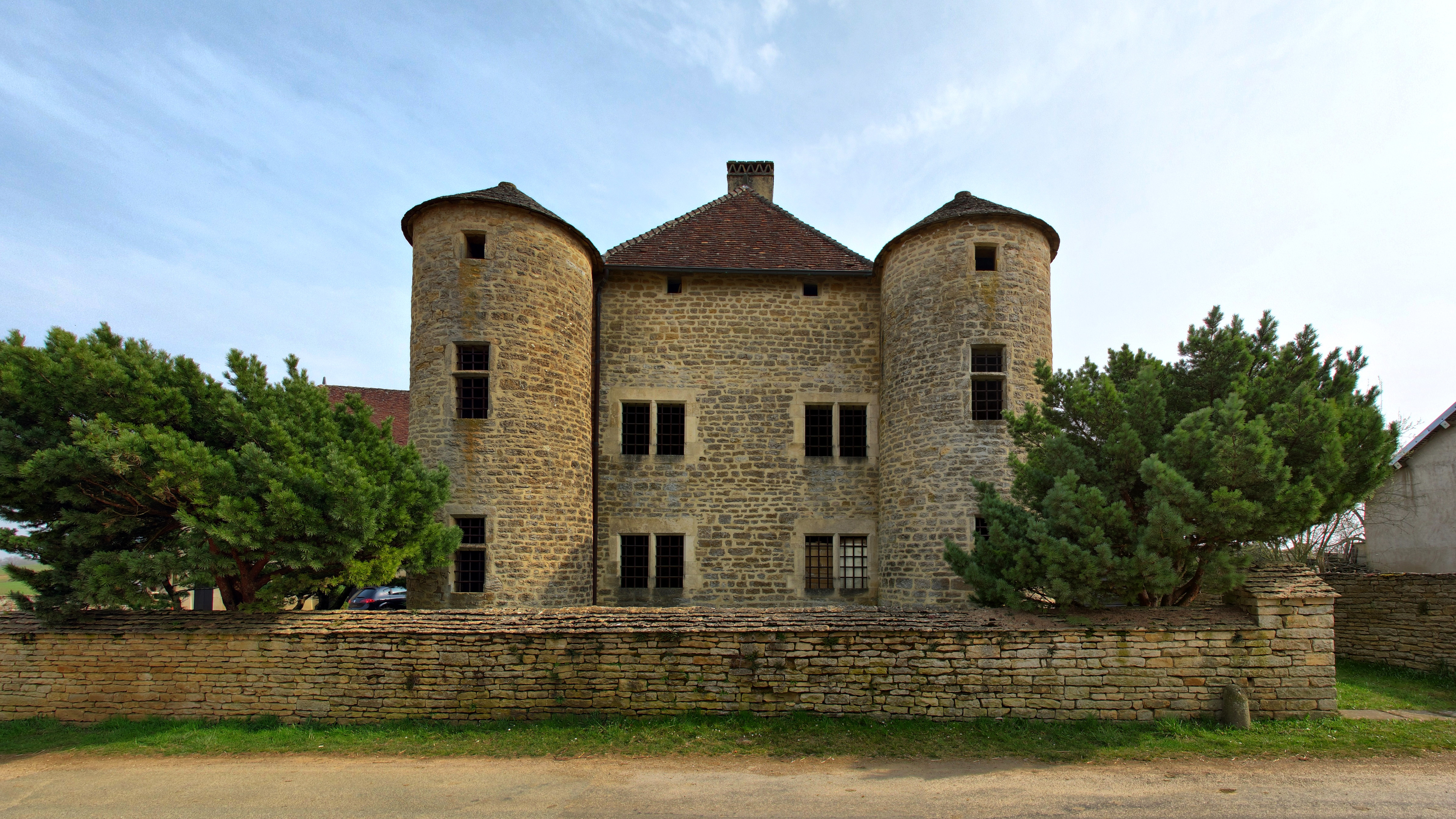
The House of Bailly

- House of Bailly.
- Étrabonne Castle, from medieval times, listed as a historical monument in 1968.
- Saint-Martin Church.

== Population ==
Historical population
Year	Pop.	±% p.a.
1968	92	—
1975	91	−0.16%
1982	101	+1.50%
1990	101	+0.00%
1999	111	+1.05%
2007	165	+5.08%
2012	192	+3.08%
2017	191	−0.10%
2023	182	−0.80%
Source: INSEE

== See also ==
- Communes of the Doubs department
