= Noironte =

- Commune
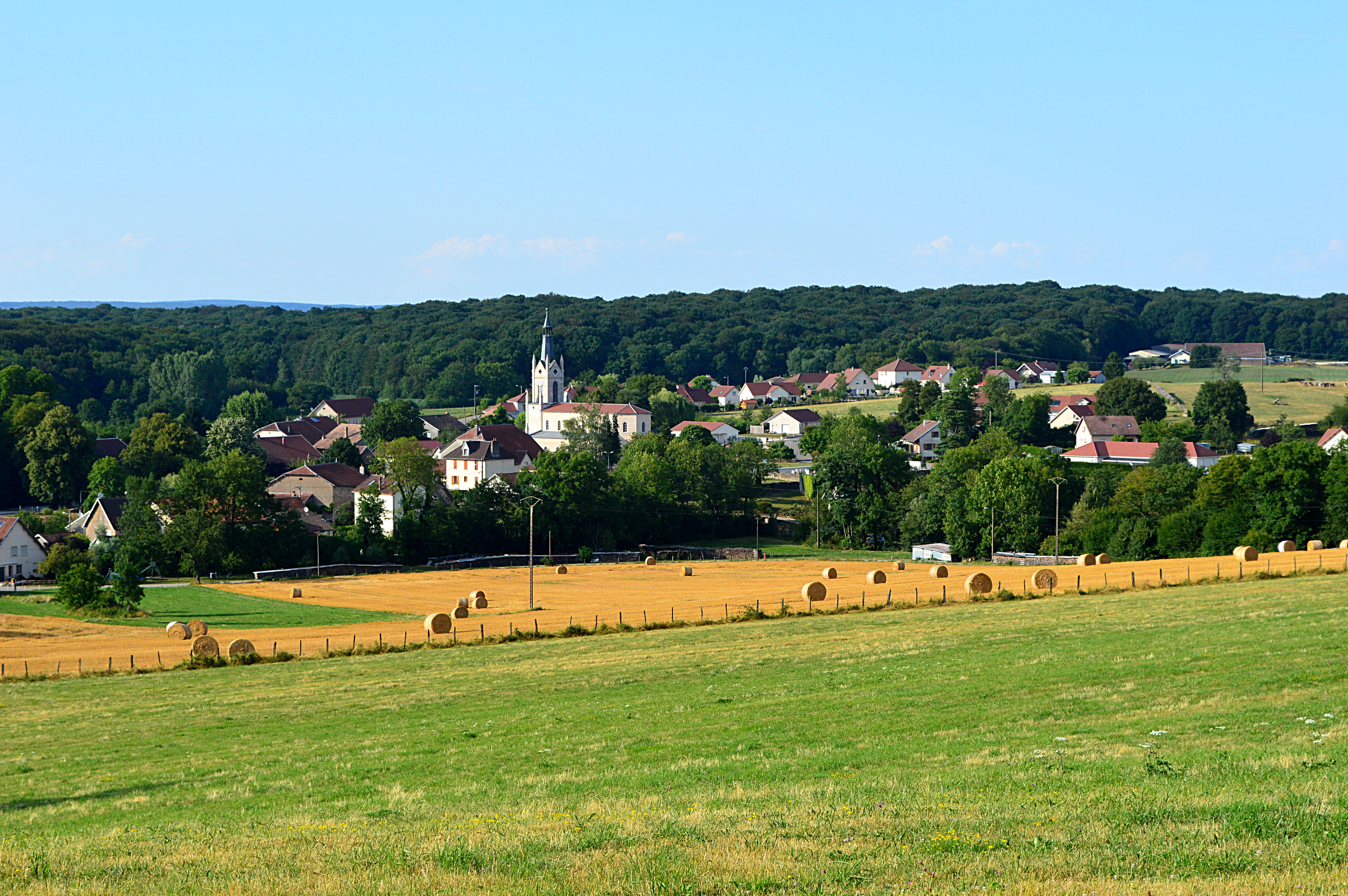
- A general view of Noironte

- Coat of arms
- Location of Noironte
- Location within France Location within Bourgogne-Franche-Comté
- Coordinates: 47°16′22″N 5°52′31″E
- Country: France
- Region: Bourgogne-Franche-Comté
- Department: Doubs
- Arrondissement: Besançon
- Canton: Besançon-2
- Intercommunality: Grand Besançon Métropole

Government
  - Mayor (2023–2026): Philippe Guillaume
- Area^{1}: 6.73 km^{2} (2.60 sq mi)
- Elevation: 224 m (735 ft)
- Highest elevation: 278 m (912 ft)
- Lowest elevation: 206 m (676 ft)
- Population (2023): 405
  - Density: 60.2/km^{2} (156/sq mi)
- Time zone: UTC+01:00 (CET)
  - Summer (DST): UTC+02:00 (CEST)
- INSEE/Postal code: 25427 /25170
- ^{1} French Land Register data, which excludes lakes, ponds, glaciers > 1 km^{2} (0.386 sq mi or 247 acres) and river estuaries.

Noironte (French pronunciation: [nwaʁɔ̃t]) is a commune in the Doubs department in the Bourgogne-Franche-Comté region in eastern France.

Noironte is an old seigneurie erected during the Middle Ages that saw the village developed around a castle. The village has always kept a rural character with agricultural activity still present in the early twenty-first century, mainly cattle breeding, polyculture and a cheese factory. Its landscape is also marked by the presence of ponds and forests that cover a large part of the communal territory. Since the end of World War II, however, the village is gradually becoming part of a process of peri-urbanisation because it is part of the urban area of Besançon and since 2003 has joined Grand Besançon Métropole urban community.

== Geography ==
The commune of Noironte is located in the Bourgogne-Franche-Comté region and in the north-western extremity of the departement of Doubs. It lies 11.5 km (7.1 mi) west of Besançon, prefecture of the department and 64 km (40 mi) east of Dijon, the capital of the region. The shortest distance by road between the village center and the city center of Besançon (Place du Huit-Septembre) is 14 km (8.7 mi). It is at the limit of the lower valley of the river Ognon and the Jura Mountains area of Avants-Monts. It is part of the canton of Besançon-2 and Grand Besançon Métropole. It is also integrated in the functional urban area of Besançon. The municipal territory is bordered by nine other municipalities.

== Population ==
Its inhabitants called Noirontais and oirontaises in French.

Historical population
Year	Pop.	±% p.a.
1968	215	—
1975	254	+2.41%
1982	236	−1.04%
1990	303	+3.17%
1999	321	+0.64%
2007	311	−0.39%
2012	365	+3.25%
2017	386	+1.13%
2023	405	+0.80%
Source: INSEE

== Landmarks ==
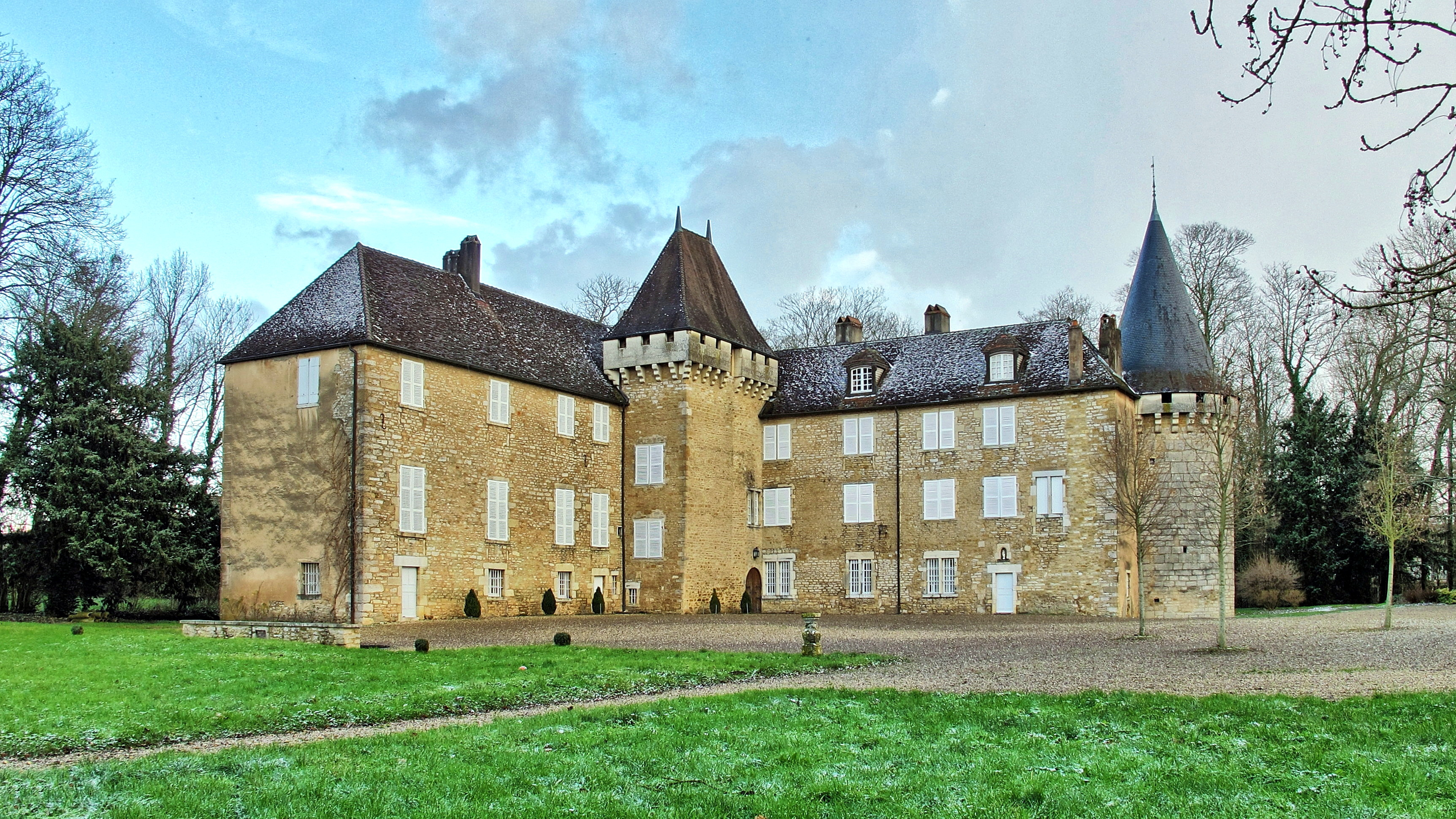
Château de Noironte

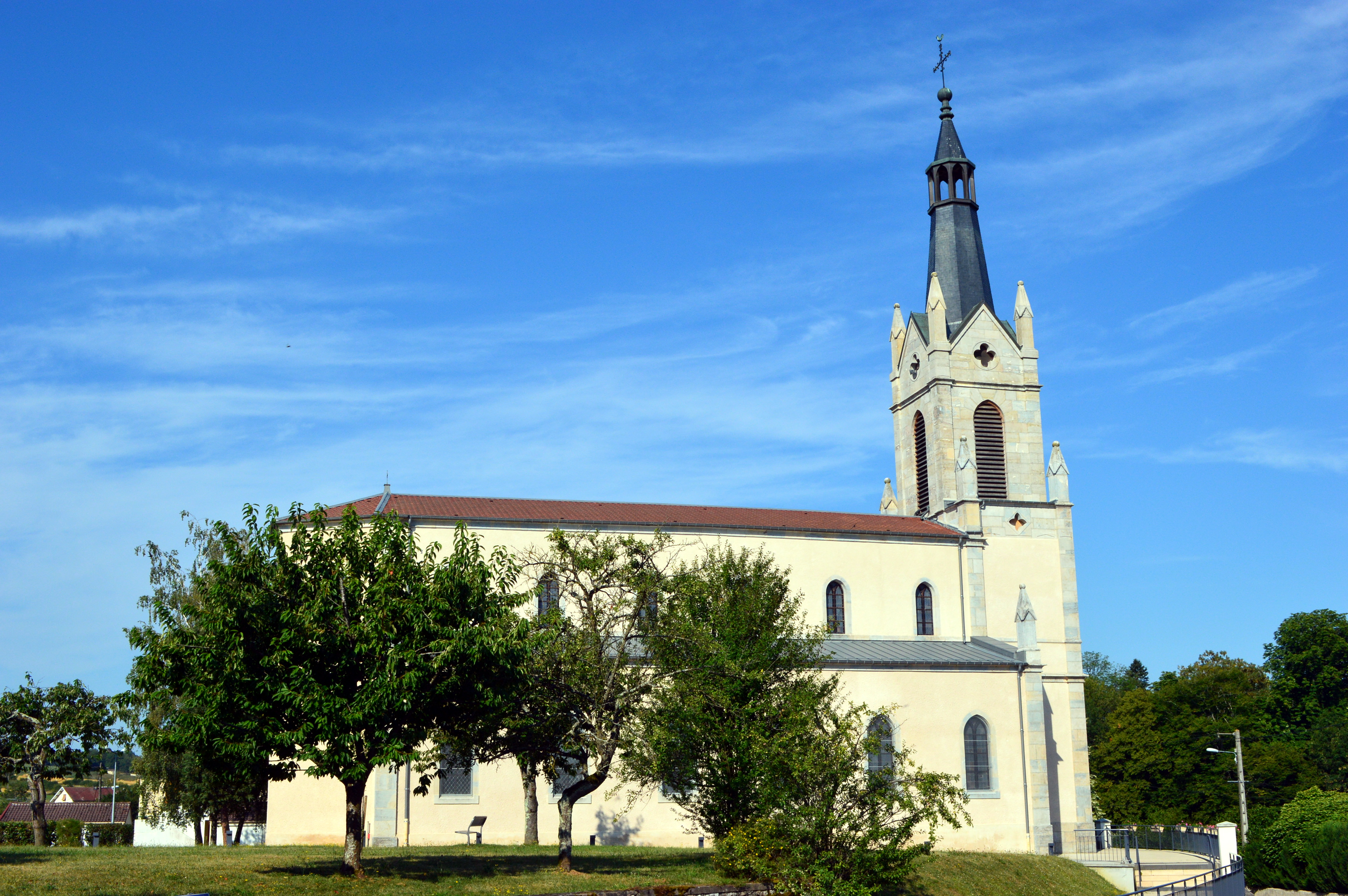
Saint-Martin church

The Château de Noironte is a castle whose existence dates back to the fourteenth century and was completely rebuilt between 1786 and 1830 following a fire. It has undergone few transformations since. Located in the center of the village, within a large wooded park, it consists of a main building, old farm buildings, a dovecote and a pavilion that served as a sculpture workshop for René de Chateaubrun at the beginning of the 20th century. The main building itself is made up of two wings arranged in the shape of an L, the north wing comprising a square tower and the east wing being flanked by a round tower. By order of July 5, 1993, the rooms in the north wing and their decorations (dining room, library, billiard room, large white living room) were classified as monuments historiques. All the facades and roofs of the main building and outbuildings as well as several elements of the main building (grand staircase, fireplaces and alcoves) benefit from less protection, having simply been listed and not classified as monuments historiques by decree of June 17, 1992.

The Saint-Martin church was built from 1855 to 1880 under the leadership of architect Martin Belliard, replacing the old chapel dedicated to St. John the Baptist. It is a neo-Gothic building about thirty meters long by fifteen meters wide built at the eastern entrance to the village. The bell tower of the church of Noironte, with a height of 39 meters, presents an original architecture, quite far from the traditional Comtois bell tower in the region. It is a spire with a truncated octagonal pyramid shape, framed by four pinnacles and surmounted by a roof lantern and a cross. Among the church furnishings is a carved wooden pulpit from the 18th century classified since 1975 as a historic monument object, a tall twisted wooden column from the 17th or 18th century, and two wooden confessionals.

== See also ==
- Communes of the Doubs department
