= Serre-les-Sapins =

- Commune
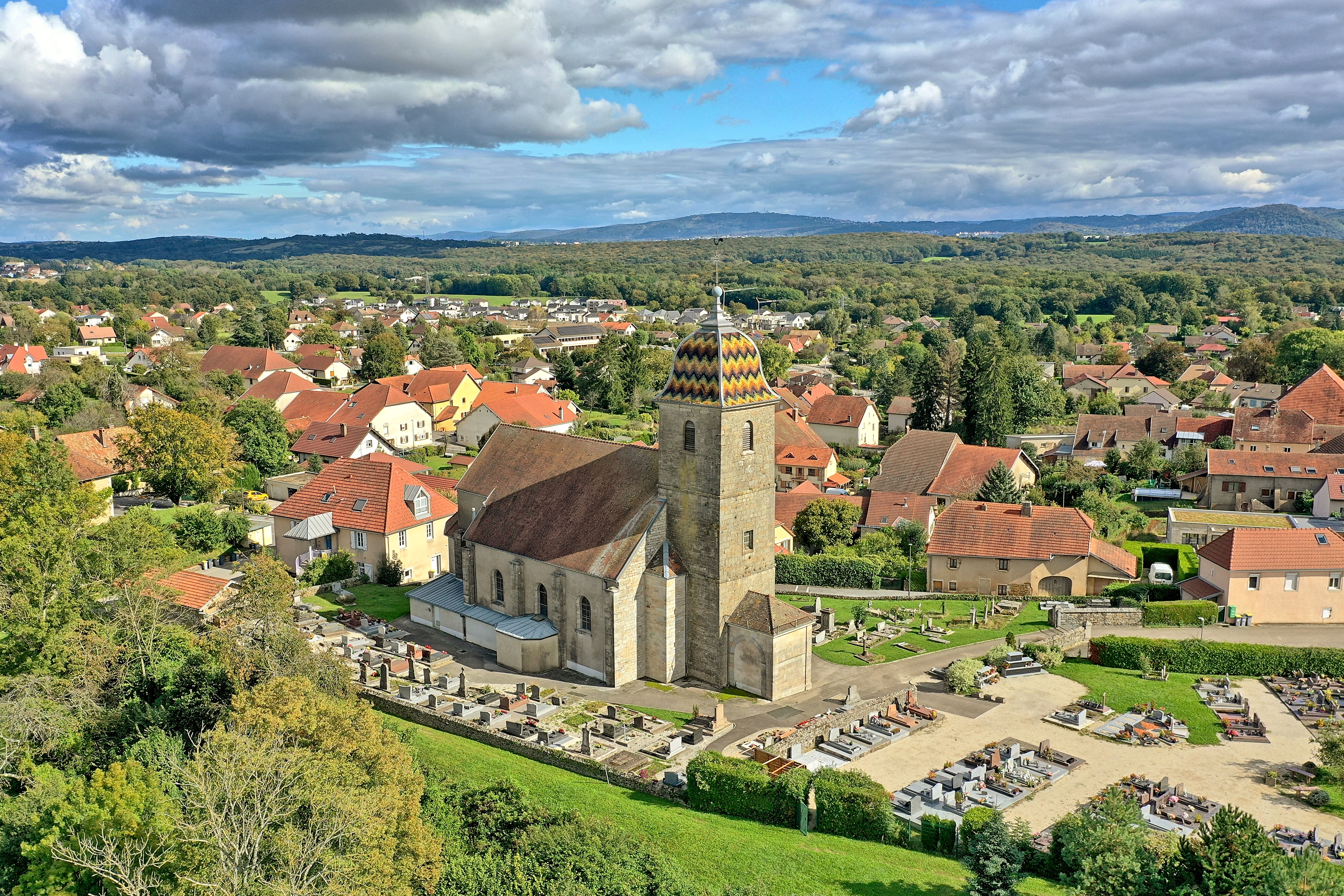
- Aerial view of Serre-les-Sapins
- Location of Serre-les-Sapins
- Location within France Location within Bourgogne-Franche-Comté
- Coordinates: 47°14′35″N 5°55′48″E
- Country: France
- Region: Bourgogne-Franche-Comté
- Department: Doubs
- Arrondissement: Besançon
- Canton: Besançon-2
- Intercommunality: Grand Besançon Métropole

Government
  - Mayor (2020–2026): Gabriel Baulieu
- Area^{1}: 5.24 km^{2} (2.02 sq mi)
- Highest elevation: 314 m (1,030 ft)
- Lowest elevation: 238 m (781 ft)
- Population (2023): 2,004
  - Density: 382/km^{2} (991/sq mi)
- Time zone: UTC+01:00 (CET)
  - Summer (DST): UTC+02:00 (CEST)
- INSEE/Postal code: 25542 /25770
- ^{1} French Land Register data, which excludes lakes, ponds, glaciers > 1 km^{2} (0.386 sq mi or 247 acres) and river estuaries.

Serre-les-Sapins (French pronunciation: [sɛʁ le sapɛ̃]) is a commune in the Doubs department in the Bourgogne-Franche-Comté region in eastern France.

== Geography ==
The commune lies 8 km (5.0 mi) west of Besançon in the greater metropolitan area.

== Population ==
Historical population
Year	Pop.	±% p.a.
1968	434	—
1975	647	+5.87%
1982	894	+4.73%
1990	1,251	+4.29%
1999	1,354	+0.88%
2007	1,559	+1.78%
2012	1,530	−0.37%
2017	1,639	+1.39%
2023	2,004	+3.41%
Source: INSEE

== See also ==
- Communes of the Doubs department
