= Château de Noironte =

Château in Bourgogne-Franche-Comté, France

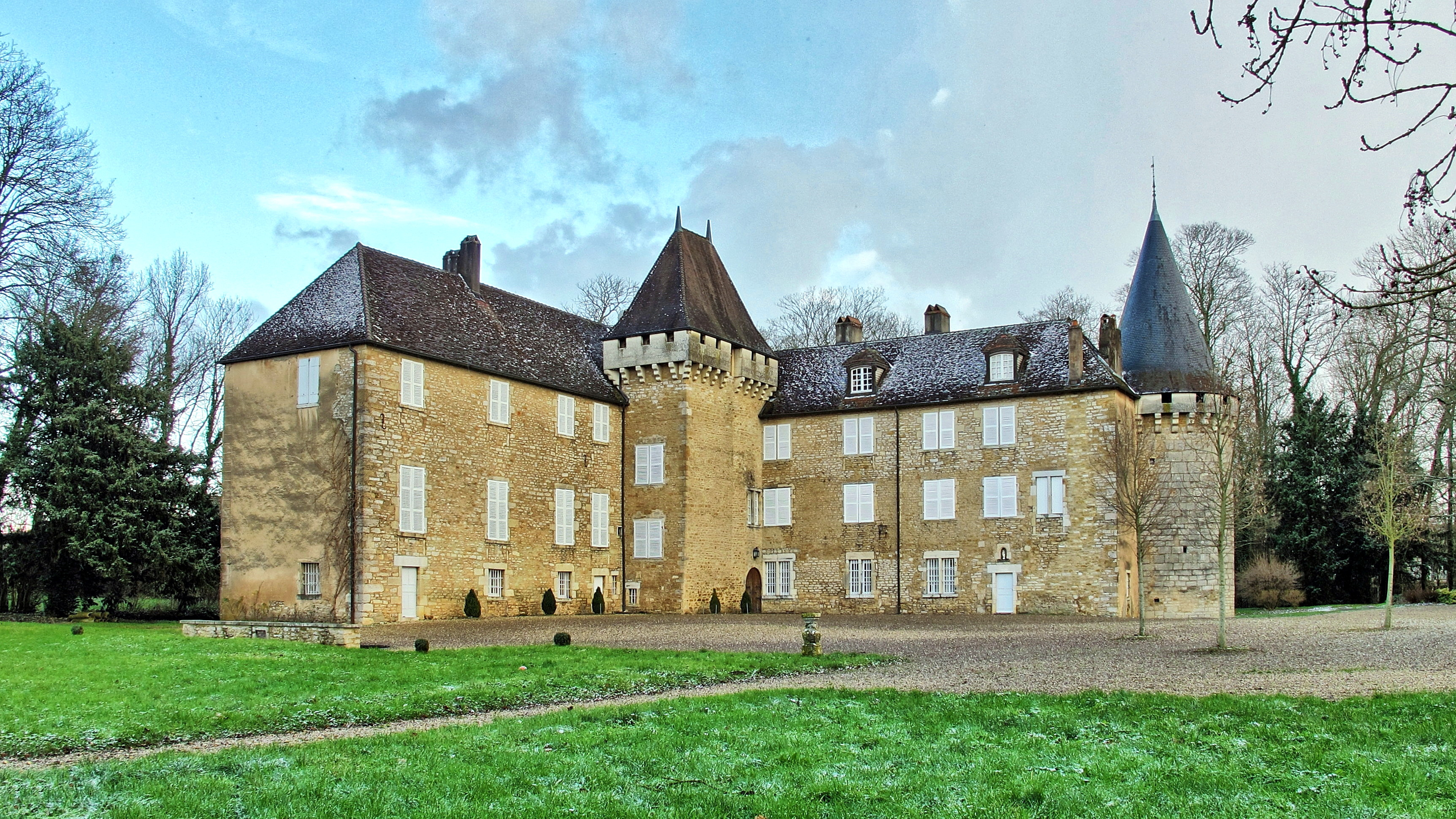

- Location within France

General information
- Location: Noironte, Doubs, France, 8 Grande Rue, Noironte, France
- Coordinates: 47.2731°N 5.8753°E

The Château de Noironte (French pronunciation: [ʃɑto də nwaʁɔ̃t]) is a castle located in the French commune of Noironte in the Doubs department and the Bourgogne-Franche-Comté region. It has been listed since 1992 as a monument historique by the French Ministry of Culture.

== See also ==
- List of castles in France
- Noironte

== Bibliography ==
- Courtieu, Jean (1986). Dictionnaire des communes du département du Doubs. Besançon: Cêtre. ISBN 2-901040-292.
