= Pouilley-les-Vignes =

- Commune
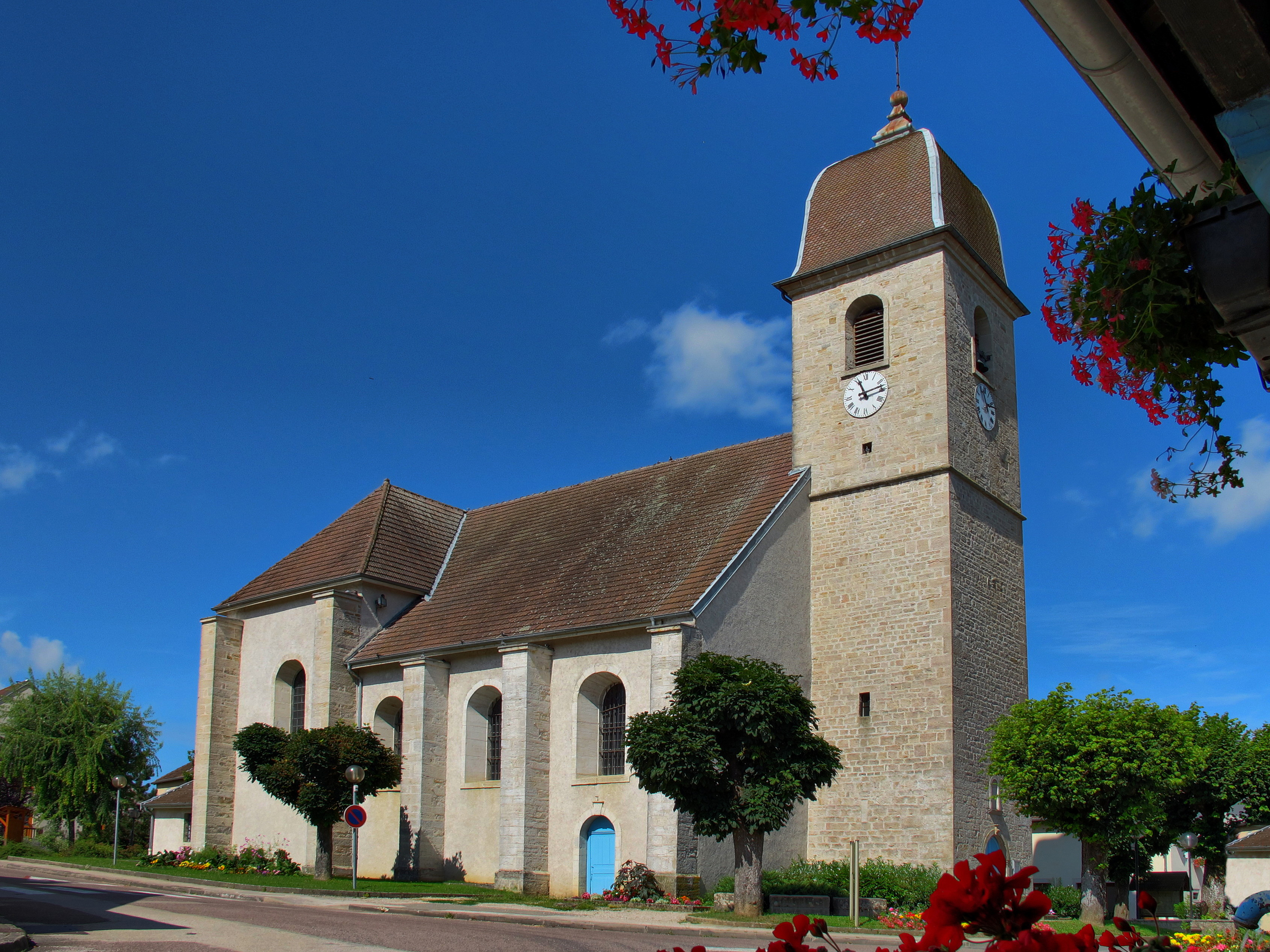
- The church in Pouilley-les-Vignes
- Location of Pouilley-les-Vignes
- Location within France Location within Bourgogne-Franche-Comté
- Coordinates: 47°15′27″N 5°56′12″E
- Country: France
- Region: Bourgogne-Franche-Comté
- Department: Doubs
- Arrondissement: Besançon
- Canton: Besançon-2
- Intercommunality: Grand Besançon Métropole

Government
  - Mayor (2020–2026): Jean-Marc Bousset
- Area^{1}: 9.34 km^{2} (3.61 sq mi)
- Highest elevation: 354 m (1,161 ft)
- Lowest elevation: 217 m (712 ft)
- Population (2023): 2,195
  - Density: 235/km^{2} (609/sq mi)
- Time zone: UTC+01:00 (CET)
  - Summer (DST): UTC+02:00 (CEST)
- INSEE/Postal code: 25467 /25115
- ^{1} French Land Register data, which excludes lakes, ponds, glaciers > 1 km^{2} (0.386 sq mi or 247 acres) and river estuaries.

Pouilley-les-Vignes (French pronunciation: [pujɛ le viɲ]) is a commune in the Doubs department in the Bourgogne-Franche-Comté region in eastern France.

== Geography ==
The commune lies 8 km (5.0 mi) northwest of Besançon. Fortifications were built on the surrounding heights by Jean de Chalon, Count of Burgundy in the 10th century. The only remains are the Porte d'Orange, a gate carved from the rock, and the Baraque des Enragés, a subterranean entrance to the fort.

== Population ==
Historical population
Year	Pop.	±% p.a.
1968	729	—
1975	1,017	+4.87%
1982	1,358	+4.22%
1990	1,707	+2.90%
1999	1,802	+0.60%
2007	1,868	+0.45%
2012	1,905	+0.39%
2017	1,965	+0.62%
2023	2,195	+1.86%
Source: INSEE

== Economy ==
Until 1920, wines such as Pulsard, Pinot, and Gamay were made in the commune, but very few small vineyards remain.

== See also ==
- Communes of the Doubs department
