= Mazerolles-le-Salin =

- Commune
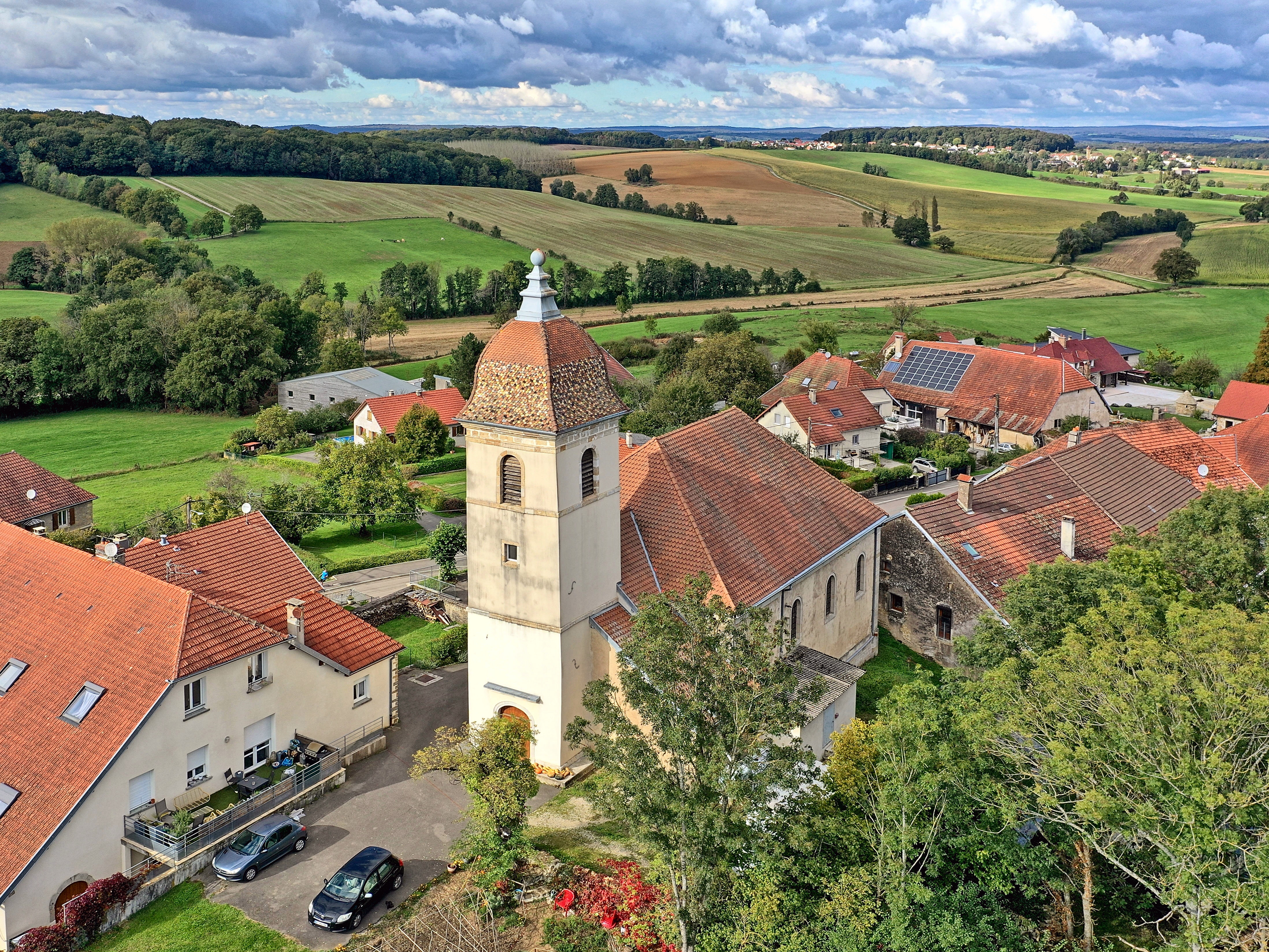
- Church

- Coat of arms
- Location of Mazerolles-le-Salin
- Location within France Location within Bourgogne-Franche-Comté
- Coordinates: 47°14′29″N 5°52′12″E
- Country: France
- Region: Bourgogne-Franche-Comté
- Department: Doubs
- Arrondissement: Besançon
- Canton: Besançon-2
- Intercommunality: Grand Besançon Métropole

Government
  - Mayor (2020–2026): Daniel Paris
- Area^{1}: 4.2 km^{2} (1.6 sq mi)
- Highest elevation: 292 m (958 ft)
- Lowest elevation: 222 m (728 ft)
- Population (2023): 218
  - Density: 52/km^{2} (130/sq mi)
- Time zone: UTC+01:00 (CET)
  - Summer (DST): UTC+02:00 (CEST)
- INSEE/Postal code: 25371 /25170
- ^{1} French Land Register data, which excludes lakes, ponds, glaciers > 1 km^{2} (0.386 sq mi or 247 acres) and river estuaries.

Mazerolles-le-Salin (French pronunciation: [mazʁɔl lə salɛ̃]) is a commune in the Doubs department in the Bourgogne-Franche-Comté region in eastern France.

== Geography ==
Mazerolles lies 13 km (8.1 mi) west of Besançon.

== Population ==
Historical population
Year	Pop.	±% p.a.
1968	95	—
1975	122	+3.64%
1982	152	+3.19%
1990	133	−1.66%
1999	171	+2.83%
2007	184	+0.92%
2012	213	+2.97%
2017	200	−1.25%
2023	218	+1.45%
Source: INSEE

== See also ==
- Communes of the Doubs department
