= Canton of Besançon-2 =

Administrative division of Doubs, France

Coordinates: 47.25°N 6.00°E

The canton of Besançon-2 is an administrative division of the Doubs department, eastern France. It was created at the French canton reorganisation which came into effect in March 2015. Its seat is in Besançon.

It consists of the following communes:

1. Audeux
2. Besançon (partly)
3. Champagney
4. Champvans-les-Moulins
5. Chaucenne
6. École-Valentin
7. Mazerolles-le-Salin
8. Noironte
9. Pelousey
10. Pirey
11. Pouilley-les-Vignes
12. Serre-les-Sapins
