= Étrabonne Castle =

Castle in France

- Château d'Étrabonne (French)
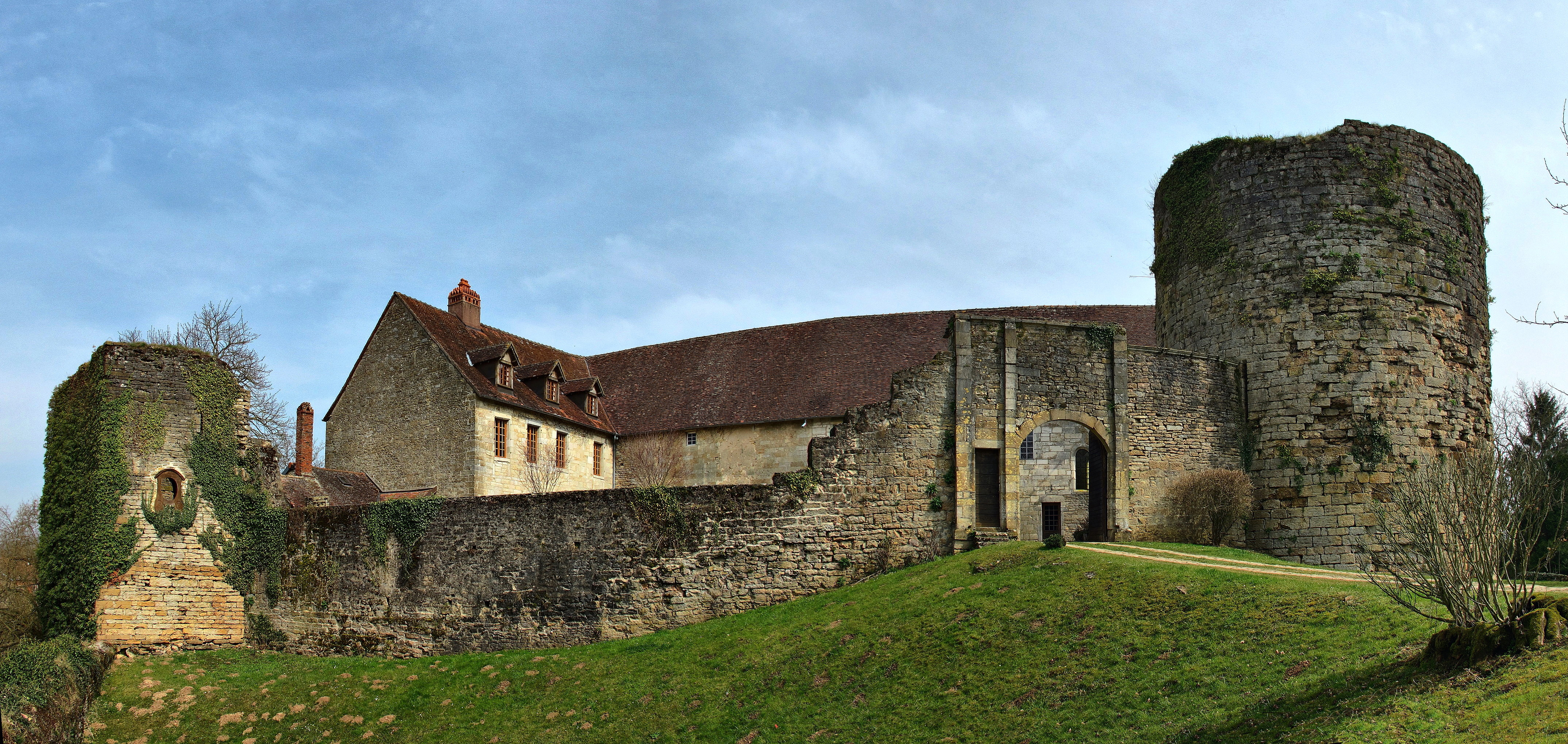
- Listed as historical monuments under the number PA00101642

- Location within France Location within Bourgogne-Franche-Comté
- 47°14′03″N 5°44′35″E
- Location: Étrabonne, Doubs, France

History
- Founded: 1084

Monument historique
- Type: Registered
- Designated: December 27, 2019

The Château d'Étrabonne (transl. Étrabonne Castle) is a castle of the 13th century inscribed with historical monuments, in the commune of Étrabonne, in the French department of Doubs.

== History ==
The castle, founded around 1084 by Narduin d'Estrabonne, rebuilt in stone at the beginning of the 13th century, was extensively altered around 1450 by William III. On the death of the last of the Estrabonne in 1471, it passed into the Aumont family, before being dismantled by the troops of Louis XI in 1477. It suffered further damage during the various wars that affected the county. But its transformation into a farm from 1570 saved it from destruction during the Revolution. The castle still retains its feudal aspect with in particular the great hall, the chapel and the remains of three towers, including a powerful keep.

The castle in its current form is built after the ruin of the feudal castle after the Thirty Years' War.

The entire castle has been listed as a historical monument since the December 27, 2019 and is also a registered site by decree of November 13, 1942.

== Architecture and decorations ==
The castle still has the remains of a circular keep as well as a main building dating from the 15th century in the shape of a "U".
