= Champagney, Doubs =

Champagney
- Commune
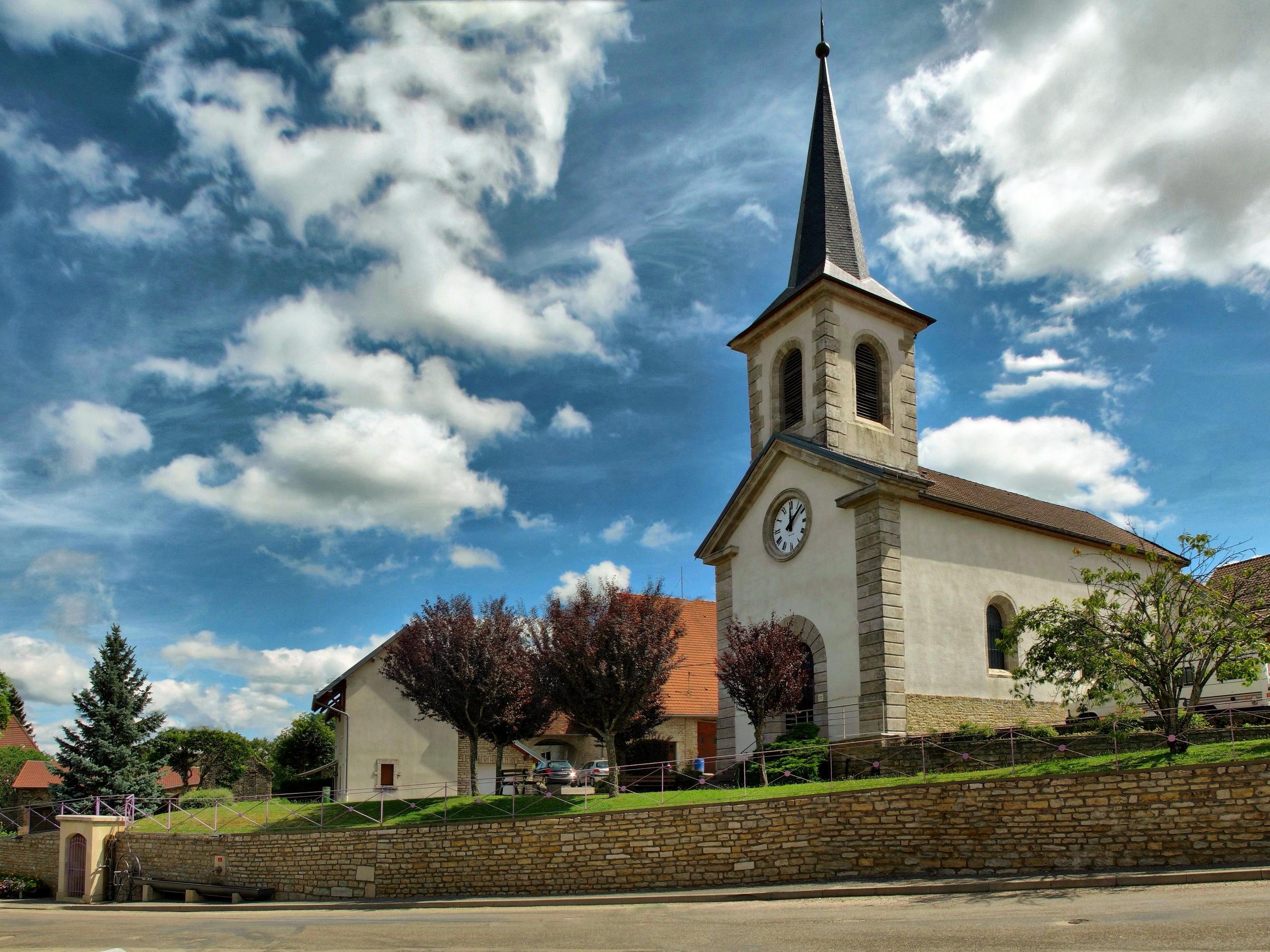
- The church in Champagney

- Coat of arms
- Location of Champagney
- Location within France Location within Bourgogne-Franche-Comté
- Coordinates: 47°15′24″N 5°54′24″E
- Country: France
- Region: Bourgogne-Franche-Comté
- Department: Doubs
- Arrondissement: Besançon
- Canton: Besançon-2
- Intercommunality: Grand Besançon Métropole

Government
  - Mayor (2020–2026): Jean-Luc Bailly
- Area^{1}: 3.01 km^{2} (1.16 sq mi)
- Highest elevation: 301 m (988 ft)
- Lowest elevation: 219 m (719 ft)
- Population (2023): 269
  - Density: 89.4/km^{2} (231/sq mi)
- Time zone: UTC+01:00 (CET)
  - Summer (DST): UTC+02:00 (CEST)
- INSEE/Postal code: 25115 /25170
- ^{1} French Land Register data, which excludes lakes, ponds, glaciers > 1 km^{2} (0.386 sq mi or 247 acres) and river estuaries.

Champagney (French pronunciation: [ʃɑ̃paɲɛ]) is a commune in the Doubs department in the Bourgogne-Franche-Comté region in eastern France.

== Population ==
Historical population
Year	Pop.	±% p.a.
1968	83	—
1975	115	+4.77%
1982	200	+8.23%
1990	228	+1.65%
1999	245	+0.80%
2007	268	+1.13%
2012	250	−1.38%
2017	286	+2.73%
2023	269	−1.02%
Source: INSEE

== See also ==
- Communes of the Doubs department
