= Champvans-les-Moulins =

- Commune
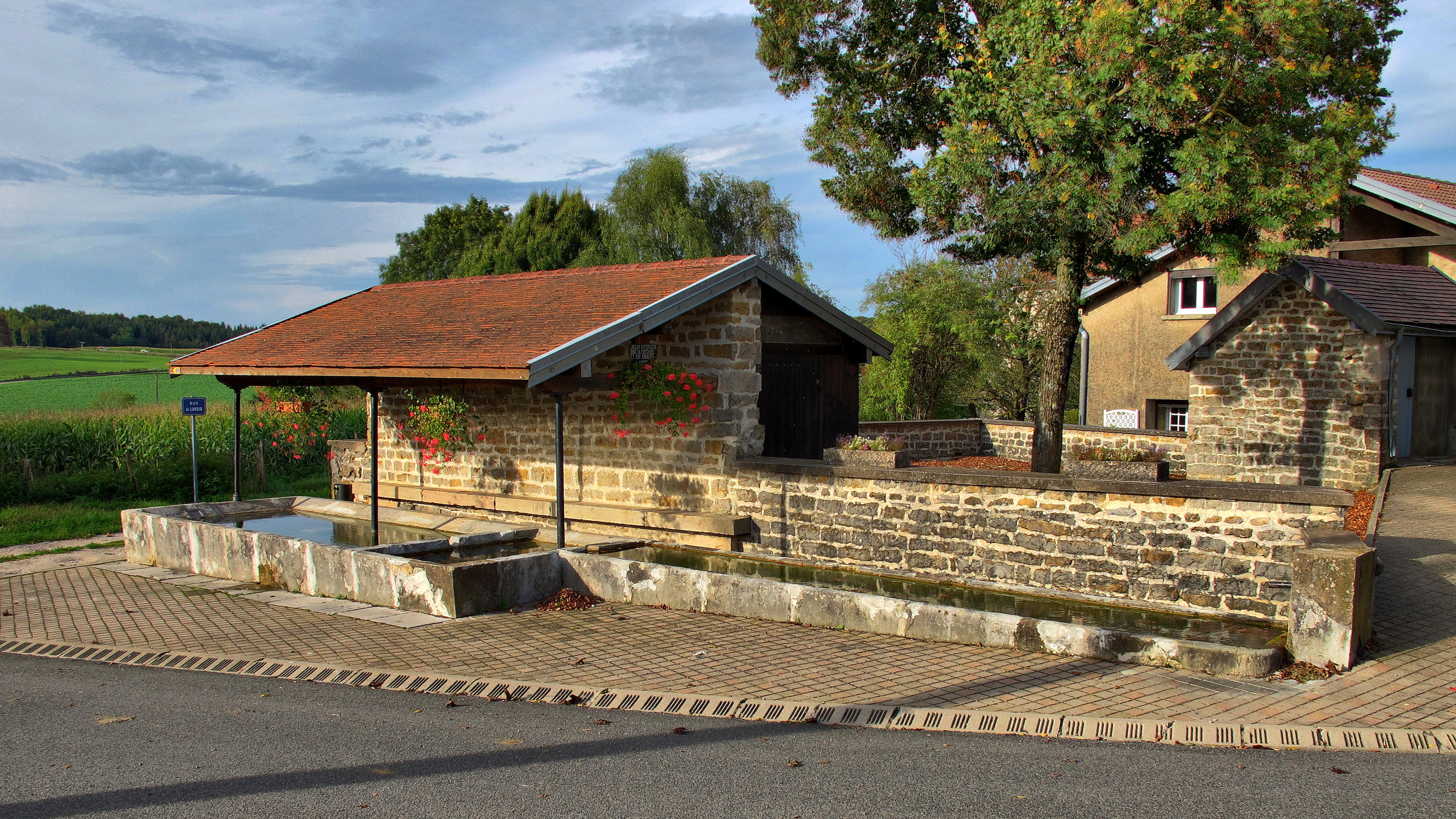
- The wash house in Champvans-les-Moulins
- Location of Champvans-les-Moulins
- Location within France Location within Bourgogne-Franche-Comté
- Coordinates: 47°15′21″N 5°54′58″E
- Country: France
- Region: Bourgogne-Franche-Comté
- Department: Doubs
- Arrondissement: Besançon
- Canton: Besançon-2
- Intercommunality: Grand Besançon Métropole

Government
  - Mayor (2020–2026): Florent Bailly
- Area^{1}: 2.52 km^{2} (0.97 sq mi)
- Highest elevation: 307 m (1,007 ft)
- Lowest elevation: 226 m (741 ft)
- Population (2023): 309
  - Density: 123/km^{2} (318/sq mi)
- Time zone: UTC+01:00 (CET)
  - Summer (DST): UTC+02:00 (CEST)
- INSEE/Postal code: 25119 /25170
- ^{1} French Land Register data, which excludes lakes, ponds, glaciers > 1 km^{2} (0.386 sq mi or 247 acres) and river estuaries.

Champvans-les-Moulins (French pronunciation: [ʃɑ̃vɑ̃ le mulɛ̃]) is a commune in the Doubs department in the Bourgogne-Franche-Comté region in eastern France.

== Population ==
Historical population
Year	Pop.	±% p.a.
1968	88	—
1975	178	+10.59%
1982	212	+2.53%
1990	237	+1.40%
1999	232	−0.24%
2007	333	+4.62%
2012	353	+1.17%
2017	340	−0.75%
2023	309	−1.58%
Source: INSEE

== See also ==
- Communes of the Doubs department
