= Lac de l'Entonnoir =

Lake in France

Lac de l'Entonnoir Lac de Bouverans
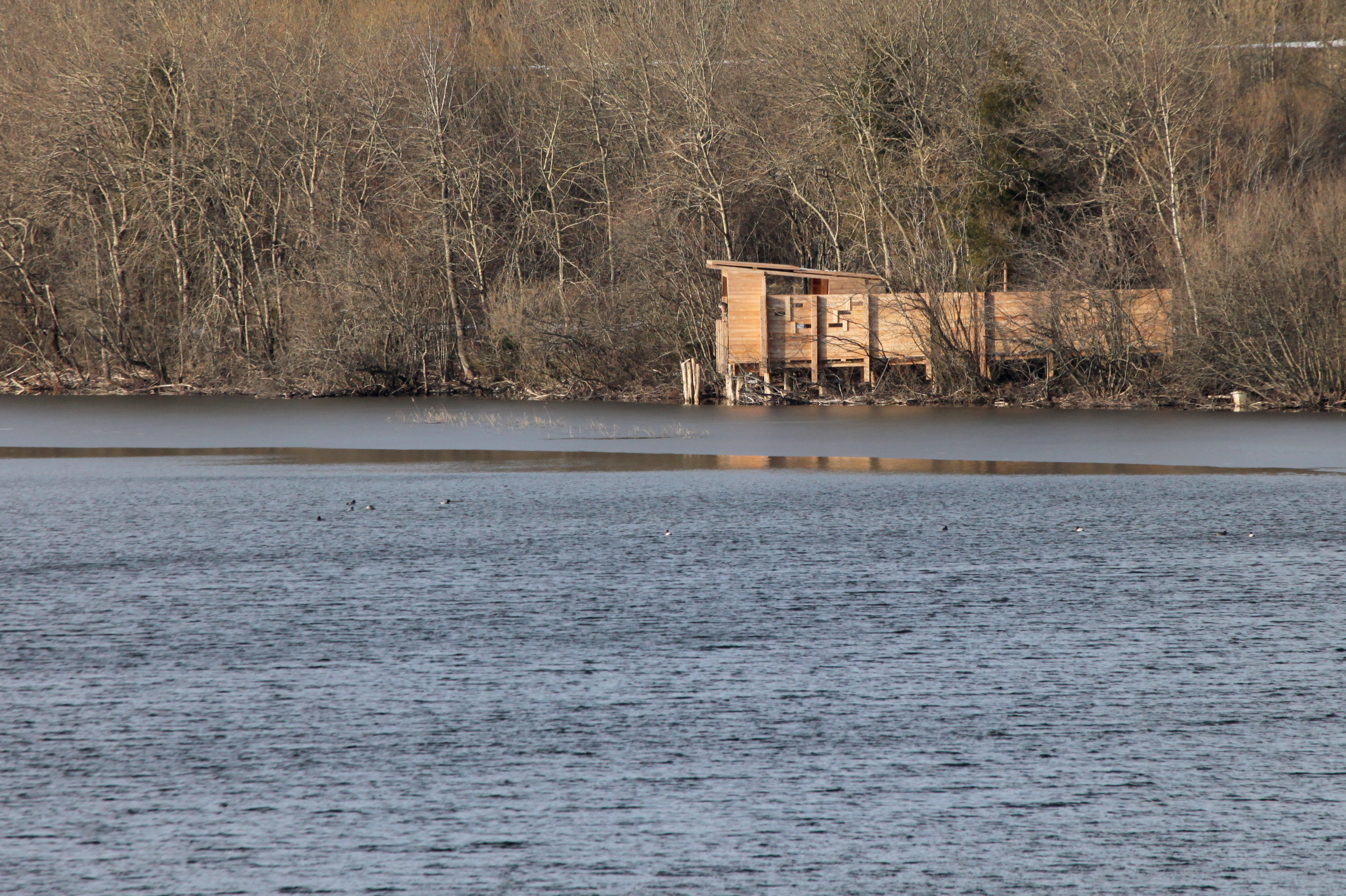
- Observatory at Lac de l’Entonnoir

- Location within France
- Location: Doubs department, Franche-Comté
- Coordinates: 46°49′48″N 6°12′6″E
- Basin countries: France

Lac de l'Entonnoir or Lac de Bouverans is a lake at Bouverans in the Doubs department of France.
