= Chaucenne =

- Commune
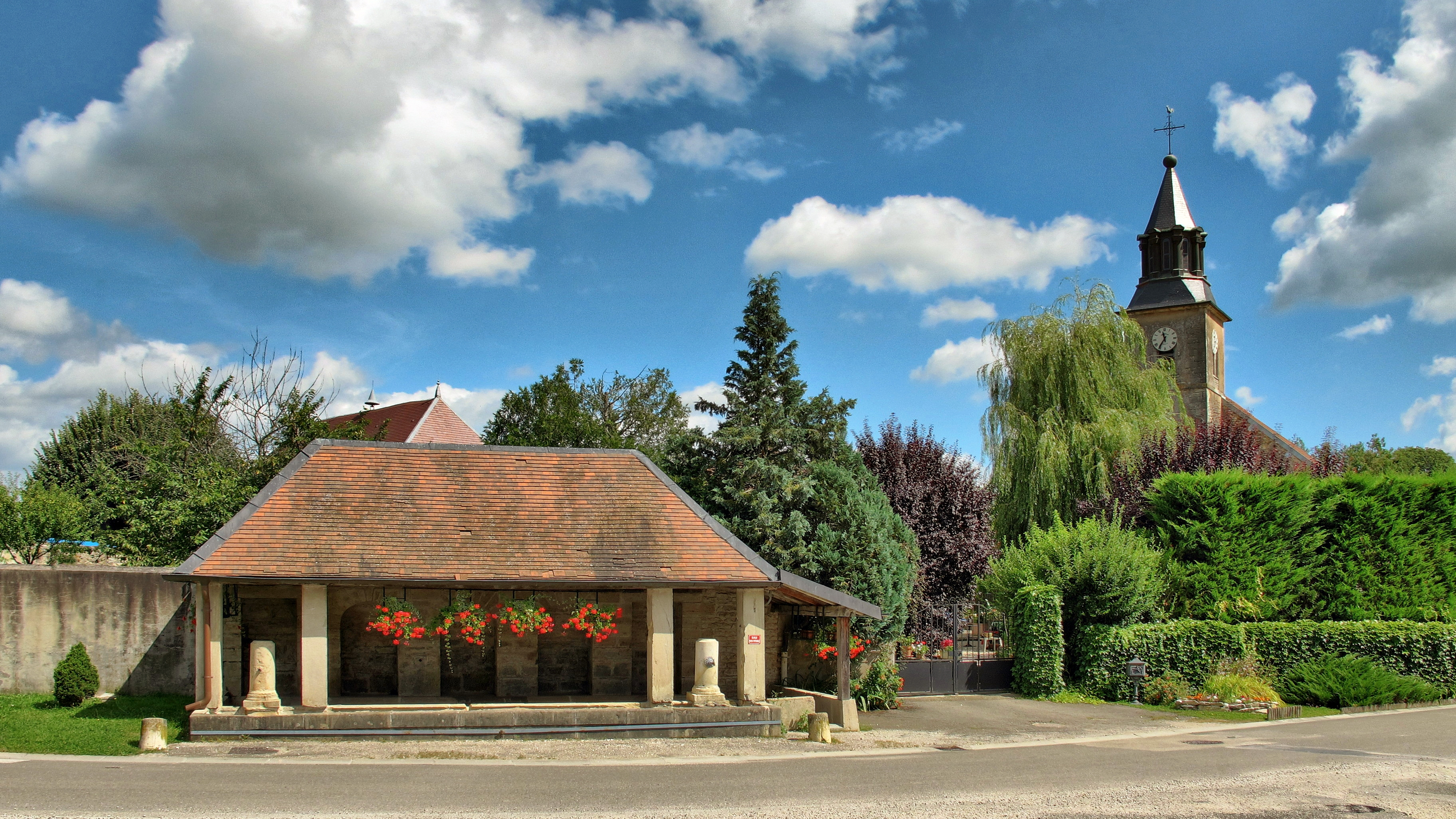
- The wash house and church in Chaucenne
- Location of Chaucenne
- Location within France Location within Bourgogne-Franche-Comté
- Coordinates: 47°17′08″N 5°53′55″E
- Country: France
- Region: Bourgogne-Franche-Comté
- Department: Doubs
- Arrondissement: Besançon
- Canton: Besançon-2
- Intercommunality: Grand Besançon Métropole

Government
  - Mayor (2020–2026): Bernard Vougnon
- Area^{1}: 4.88 km^{2} (1.88 sq mi)
- Highest elevation: 262 m (860 ft)
- Lowest elevation: 212 m (696 ft)
- Population (2023): 529
  - Density: 108/km^{2} (281/sq mi)
- Time zone: UTC+01:00 (CET)
  - Summer (DST): UTC+02:00 (CEST)
- INSEE/Postal code: 25136 /25170
- ^{1} French Land Register data, which excludes lakes, ponds, glaciers > 1 km^{2} (0.386 sq mi or 247 acres) and river estuaries.

Chaucenne (French pronunciation: [ʃosɛn]) is a commune in the Doubs department in the Bourgogne-Franche-Comté region in eastern France.

== Population ==
Historical population
| Year | Pop. | ±% p.a. |
|---|---|---|
| 1968 | 171 | — |
| 1975 | 237 | +4.77% |
| 1982 | 313 | +4.05% |
| 1990 | 442 | +4.41% |
| 1999 | 470 | +0.68% |
| 2007 | 538 | +1.70% |
| 2012 | 532 | −0.22% |
| 2017 | 511 | −0.80% |
| 2023 | 529 | +0.58% |
Source: INSEE

== See also ==
- Communes of the Doubs department
