= Pirey =

- Commune
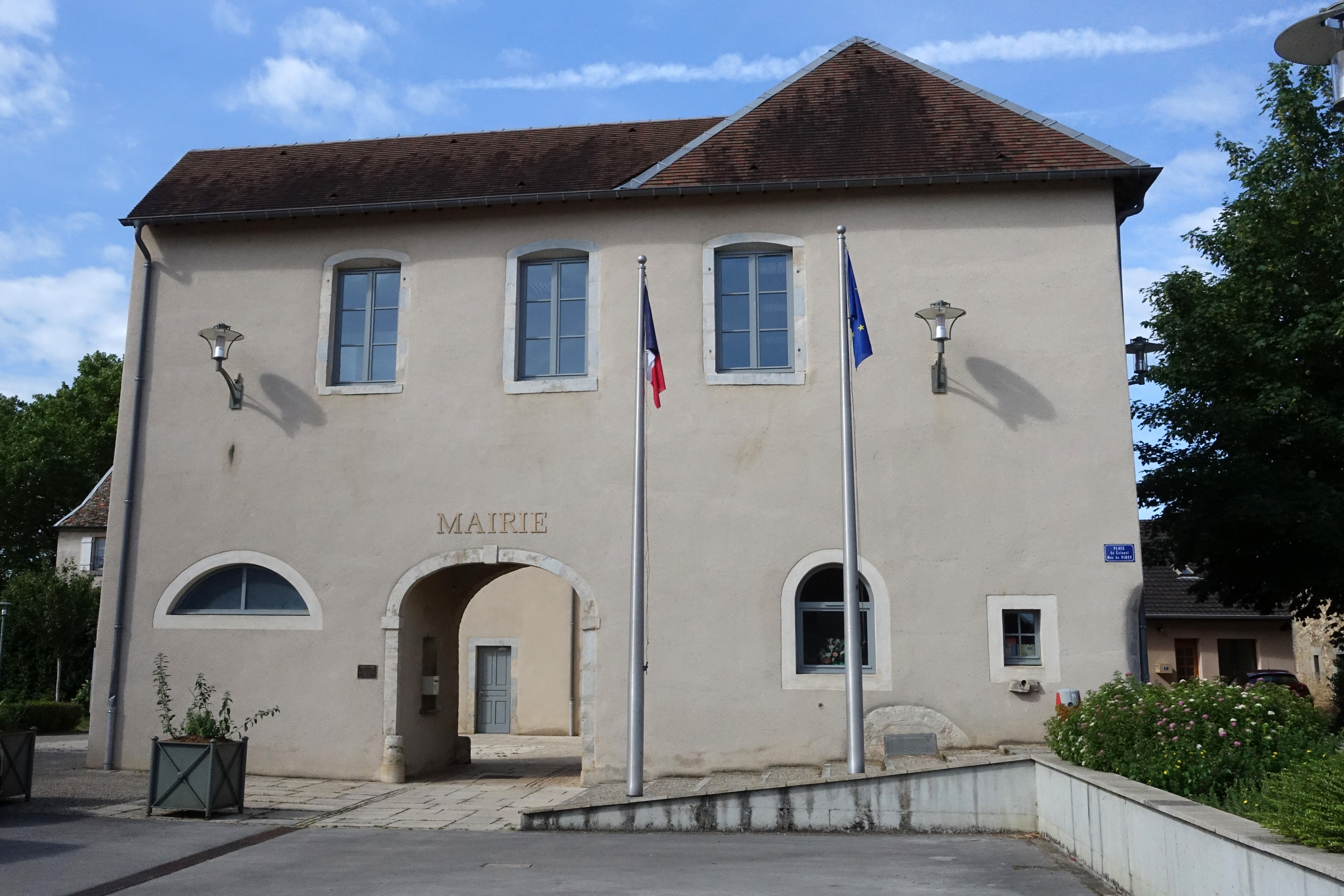
- The town hall in Pirey

- Coat of arms
- Location of Pirey
- Location within France Location within Bourgogne-Franche-Comté
- Coordinates: 47°15′45″N 5°57′50″E
- Country: France
- Region: Bourgogne-Franche-Comté
- Department: Doubs
- Arrondissement: Besançon
- Canton: Besançon-2
- Intercommunality: Grand Besançon Métropole

Government
  - Mayor (2020–2026): Patrick Ayache
- Area^{1}: 6.67 km^{2} (2.58 sq mi)
- Highest elevation: 370 m (1,210 ft)
- Lowest elevation: 260 m (850 ft)
- Population (2023): 2,156
  - Density: 323/km^{2} (837/sq mi)
- Time zone: UTC+01:00 (CET)
  - Summer (DST): UTC+02:00 (CEST)
- INSEE/Postal code: 25454 /25480
- ^{1} French Land Register data, which excludes lakes, ponds, glaciers > 1 km^{2} (0.386 sq mi or 247 acres) and river estuaries.

Pirey (French pronunciation: [piʁɛ]) is a commune in the Doubs department in the Bourgogne-Franche-Comté region in eastern France.

== Population ==
Historical population
Year	Pop.	±% p.a.
1968	459	—
1975	818	+8.60%
1982	1,055	+3.70%
1990	1,234	+1.98%
1999	1,441	+1.74%
2007	1,754	+2.49%
2012	2,060	+3.27%
2017	2,066	+0.06%
2023	2,156	+0.71%
Source: INSEE

== See also ==
- Communes of the Doubs department
