= Pelousey =

- Commune
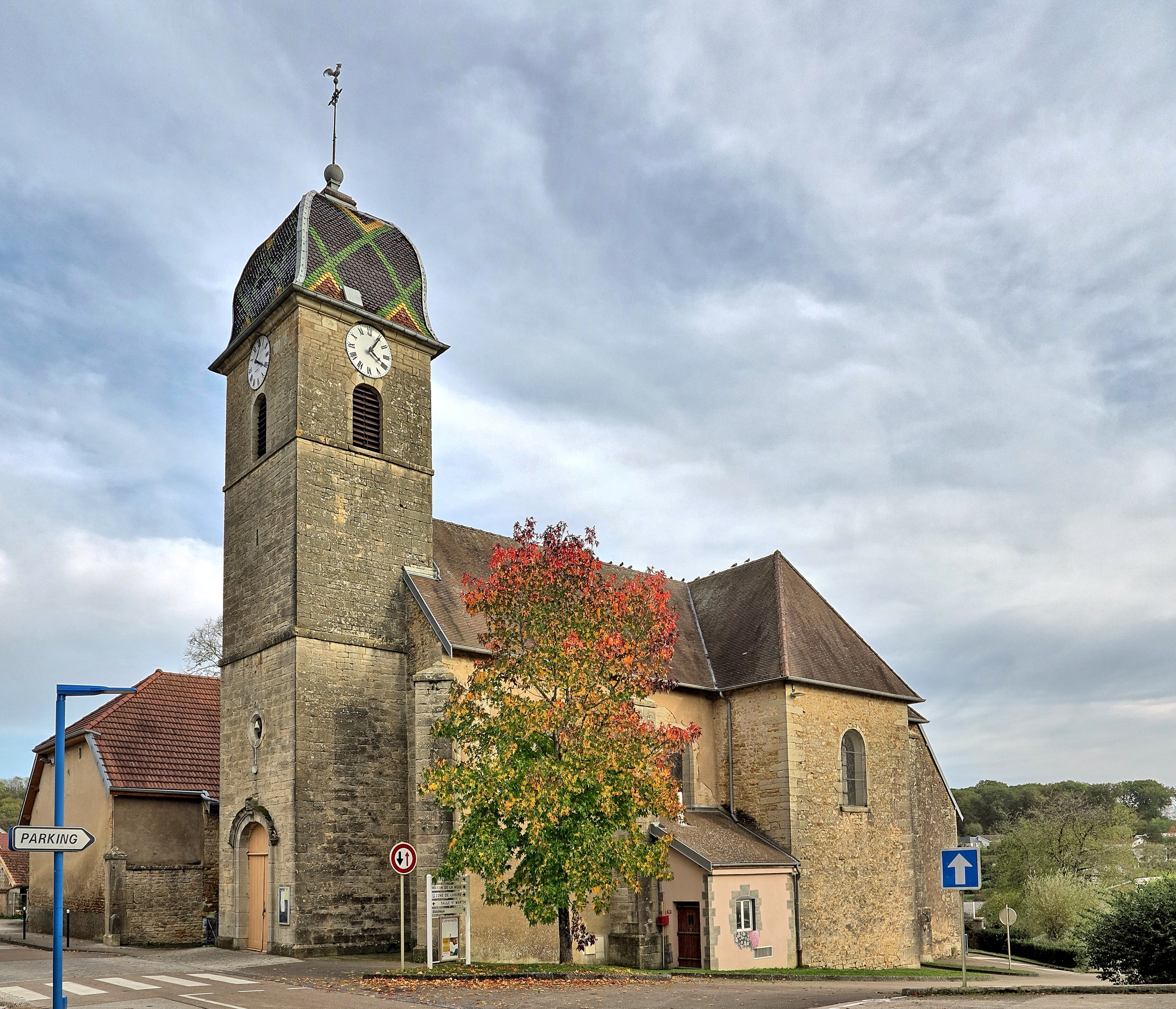
- Saint-Martin church
- Location of Pelousey
- Location within France Location within Bourgogne-Franche-Comté
- Coordinates: 47°16′34″N 5°55′21″E
- Country: France
- Region: Bourgogne-Franche-Comté
- Department: Doubs
- Arrondissement: Besançon
- Canton: Besançon-2
- Intercommunality: Grand Besançon Métropole

Government
  - Mayor (2020–2026): Catherine Barthelet
- Area^{1}: 6.18 km^{2} (2.39 sq mi)
- Highest elevation: 313 m (1,027 ft)
- Lowest elevation: 215 m (705 ft)
- Population (2023): 1,617
  - Density: 262/km^{2} (678/sq mi)
- Time zone: UTC+01:00 (CET)
  - Summer (DST): UTC+02:00 (CEST)
- INSEE/Postal code: 25448 /25170
- ^{1} French Land Register data, which excludes lakes, ponds, glaciers > 1 km^{2} (0.386 sq mi or 247 acres) and river estuaries.

Pelousey (French pronunciation: [pəluzɛ]) is a commune in the Doubs department in the Bourgogne-Franche-Comté region in eastern France.

== Population ==
Historical population
Year	Pop.	±% p.a.
1968	242	—
1975	425	+8.38%
1982	534	+3.32%
1990	902	+6.77%
1999	1,215	+3.37%
2007	1,407	+1.85%
2012	1,453	+0.65%
2017	1,527	+1.00%
2023	1,617	+0.96%
Source: INSEE

== See also ==
- Communes of the Doubs department
