= Audeux =

- Commune
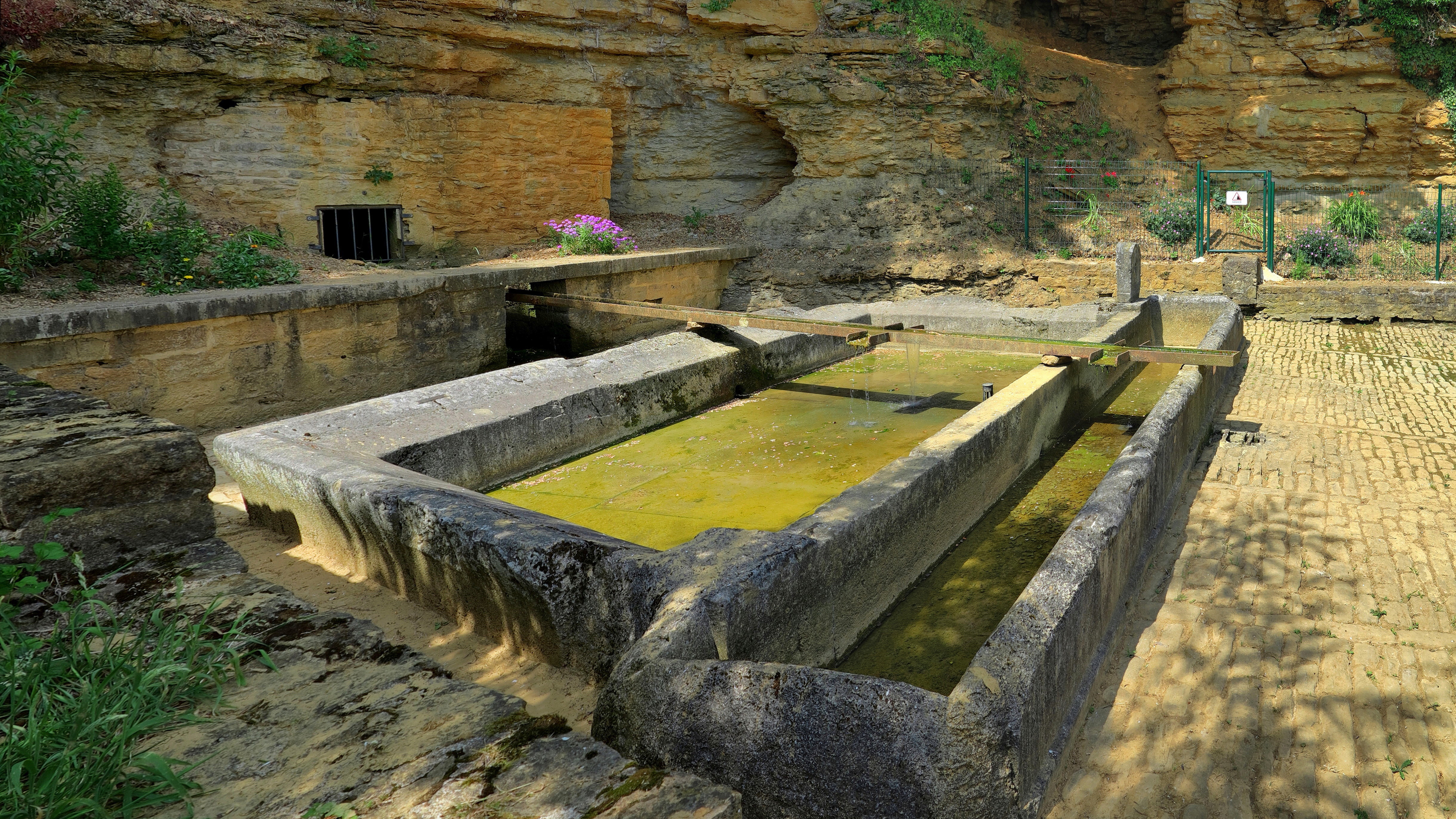
- The fountain and washhouse in Audeux
- Location of Audeux
- Location within France Location within Bourgogne-Franche-Comté
- Coordinates: 47°15′43″N 5°52′16″E
- Country: France
- Region: Bourgogne-Franche-Comté
- Department: Doubs
- Arrondissement: Besançon
- Canton: Besançon-2
- Intercommunality: Grand Besançon Métropole

Government
  - Mayor (2024–2026): Agnès Bourgeois
- Area^{1}: 1.75 km^{2} (0.68 sq mi)
- Highest elevation: 285 m (935 ft)
- Lowest elevation: 219 m (719 ft)
- Population (2023): 420
  - Density: 240/km^{2} (620/sq mi)
- Time zone: UTC+01:00 (CET)
  - Summer (DST): UTC+02:00 (CEST)
- INSEE/Postal code: 25030 /25170
- ^{1} French Land Register data, which excludes lakes, ponds, glaciers > 1 km^{2} (0.386 sq mi or 247 acres) and river estuaries.

Audeux (French pronunciation: [odø]) is a commune in the Doubs department in the Bourgogne-Franche-Comté region in eastern France. It is located about 14 km west of Besançon.

== Population ==
Historical population
| Year | Pop. | ±% p.a. |
|---|---|---|
| 1968 | 149 | — |
| 1975 | 198 | +4.15% |
| 1982 | 314 | +6.81% |
| 1990 | 320 | +0.24% |
| 1999 | 331 | +0.38% |
| 2007 | 442 | +3.68% |
| 2012 | 433 | −0.41% |
| 2017 | 433 | +0.00% |
| 2023 | 420 | −0.51% |
Source: INSEE

== See also ==
- Communes of the Doubs department
