= Bouverans =

- Commune
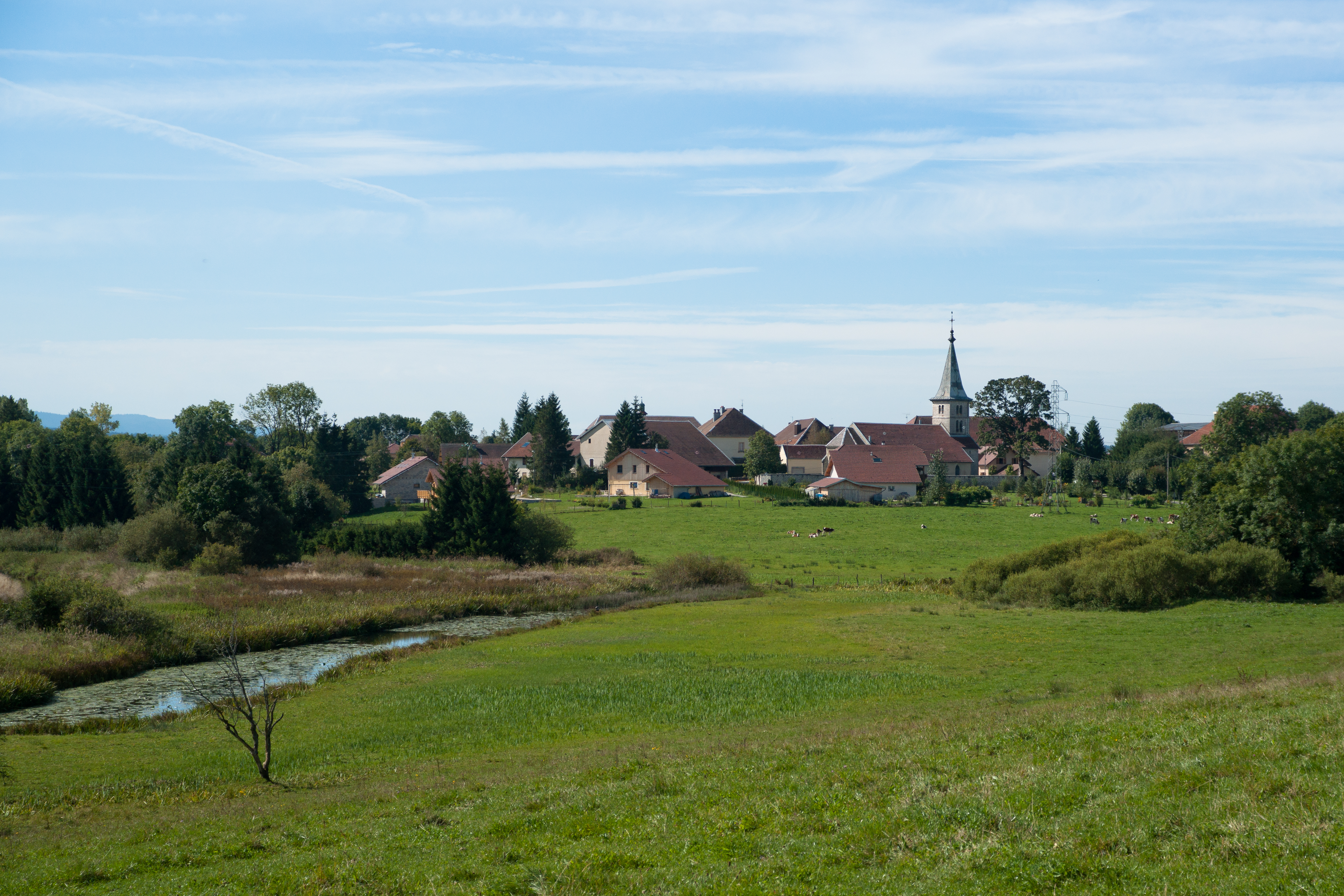
- A general view of Bouverans
- Location of Bouverans
- Location within France Location within Bourgogne-Franche-Comté
- Coordinates: 46°51′15″N 6°12′31″E
- Country: France
- Region: Bourgogne-Franche-Comté
- Department: Doubs
- Arrondissement: Pontarlier
- Canton: Frasne
- Intercommunality: Plateau de Frasne et Val du Drugeon

Government
  - Mayor (2020–2026): Rémi Débois
- Area^{1}: 18.17 km^{2} (7.02 sq mi)
- Highest elevation: 1,101 m (3,612 ft)
- Lowest elevation: 822 m (2,697 ft)
- Population (2023): 461
  - Density: 25.4/km^{2} (65.7/sq mi)
- Time zone: UTC+01:00 (CET)
  - Summer (DST): UTC+02:00 (CEST)
- INSEE/Postal code: 25085 /25560
- ^{1} French Land Register data, which excludes lakes, ponds, glaciers > 1 km^{2} (0.386 sq mi or 247 acres) and river estuaries.

Bouverans (French pronunciation: [buvʁɑ̃]) is a commune in the Doubs department in the Bourgogne-Franche-Comté region in eastern France. Lac de l'Entonnoir is located in the commune.

== Population ==
Historical population
Year	Pop.	±% p.a.
1968	207	—
1975	181	−1.90%
1982	209	+2.08%
1990	239	+1.69%
1999	270	+1.36%
2007	316	+1.99%
2012	357	+2.47%
2017	364	+0.39%
2023	461	+4.02%
Source: INSEE

== See also ==
- Communes of the Doubs department
