= Saint-Vit =

- Commune
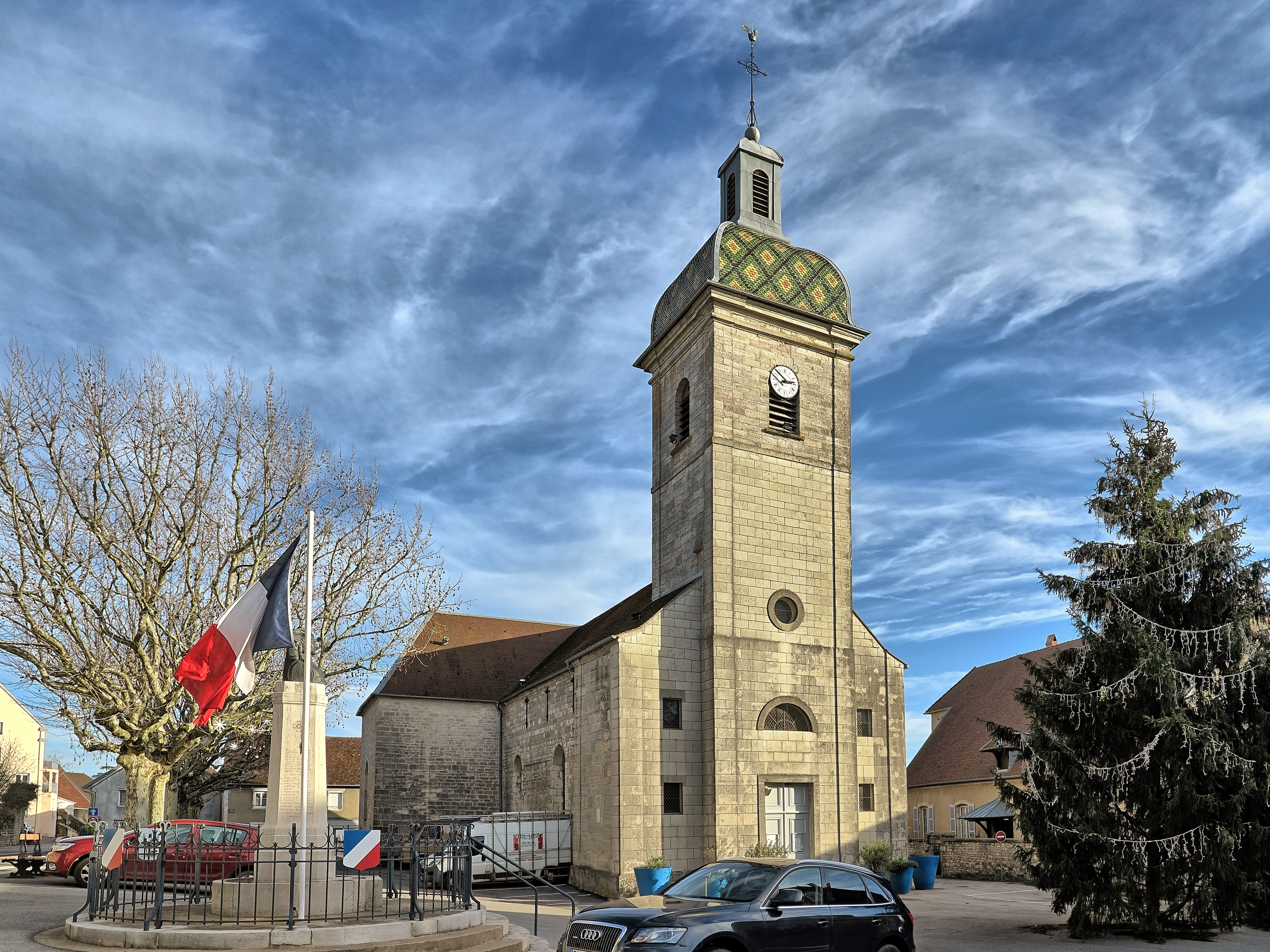
- The church of Saint-Vit

- Coat of arms
- Location of Saint-Vit
- Location within France Location within Bourgogne-Franche-Comté
- Coordinates: 47°10′56″N 5°48′41″E
- Country: France
- Region: Bourgogne-Franche-Comté
- Department: Doubs
- Arrondissement: Besançon
- Canton: Saint-Vit
- Intercommunality: Grand Besançon Métropole

Government
  - Mayor (2020–2026): Pascal Routhier
- Area^{1}: 16.44 km^{2} (6.35 sq mi)
- Highest elevation: 302 m (991 ft)
- Lowest elevation: 210 m (690 ft)
- Population (2023): 5,133
  - Density: 312.2/km^{2} (808.7/sq mi)
- Time zone: UTC+01:00 (CET)
  - Summer (DST): UTC+02:00 (CEST)
- INSEE/Postal code: 25527 /25410
- ^{1} French Land Register data, which excludes lakes, ponds, glaciers > 1 km^{2} (0.386 sq mi or 247 acres) and river estuaries.

Saint-Vit (French pronunciation: [sɛ̃ vit]) is a commune in the Doubs département in the Bourgogne-Franche-Comté region in eastern France.

== Geography ==
The town lies 11 km (6.8 mi) northwest of Boussières.

== Population ==
Historical population
Year	Pop.	±% p.a.
1968	1,579	—
1975	2,152	+4.52%
1982	2,978	+4.75%
1990	3,774	+3.01%
1999	4,381	+1.67%
2007	4,625	+0.68%
2012	4,819	+0.83%
2017	4,874	+0.23%
2023	5,133	+0.87%
Source: INSEE

== See also ==
- Communes of the Doubs department
