= Solemont =

- Commune
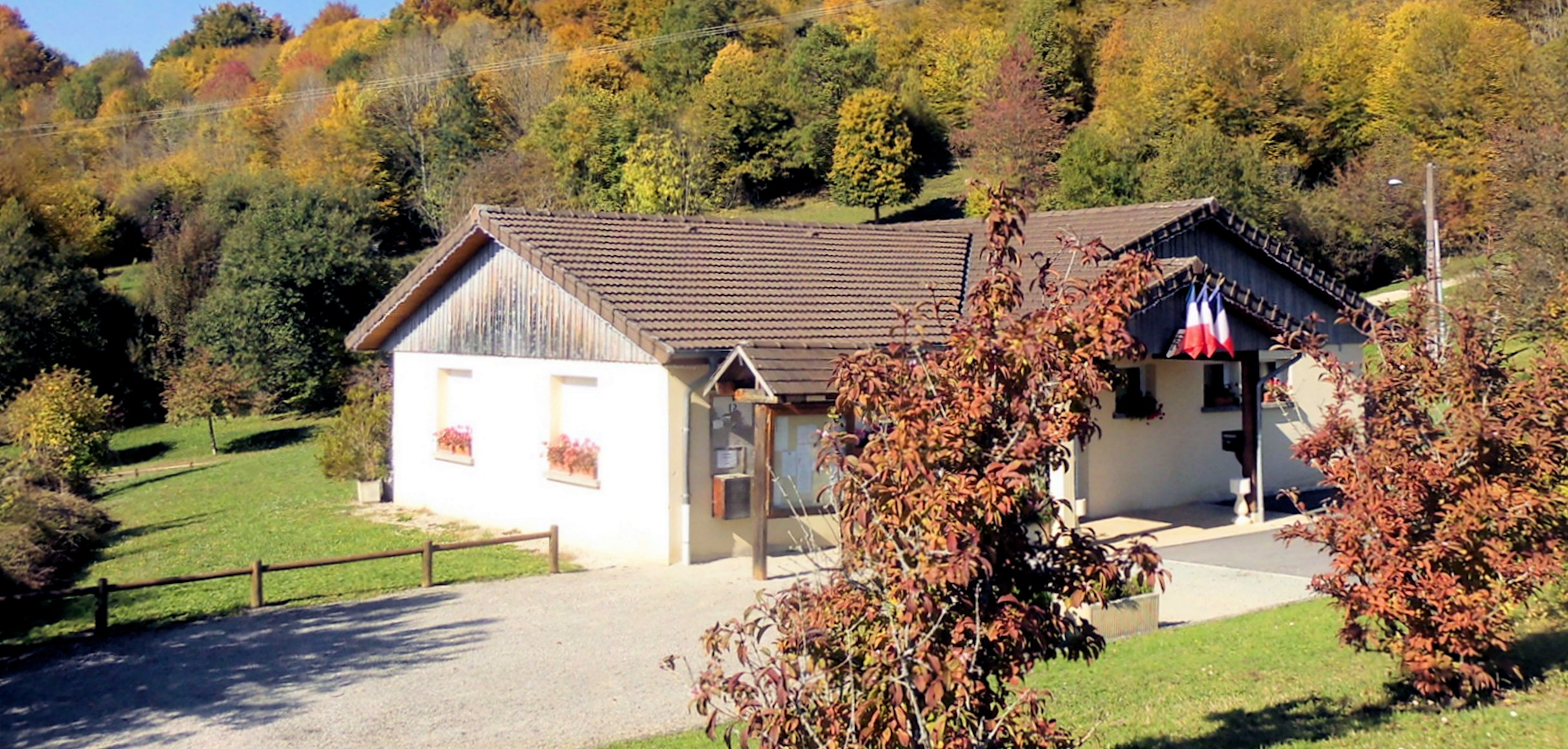
- The town hall in Solemont
- Location of Solemont
- Location within France Location within Bourgogne-Franche-Comté
- Coordinates: 47°20′40″N 6°42′18″E
- Country: France
- Region: Bourgogne-Franche-Comté
- Department: Doubs
- Arrondissement: Montbéliard
- Canton: Valentigney
- Intercommunality: Pays de Montbéliard Agglomération

Government
  - Mayor (2024–2026): Stephane Cayet
- Area^{1}: 8.09 km^{2} (3.12 sq mi)
- Highest elevation: 831 m (2,726 ft)
- Lowest elevation: 394 m (1,293 ft)
- Population (2023): 131
  - Density: 16.2/km^{2} (41.9/sq mi)
- Time zone: UTC+01:00 (CET)
  - Summer (DST): UTC+02:00 (CEST)
- INSEE/Postal code: 25548 /25190
- ^{1} French Land Register data, which excludes lakes, ponds, glaciers > 1 km^{2} (0.386 sq mi or 247 acres) and river estuaries.

Solemont (French pronunciation: [sɔlmɔ̃]) is a commune in the Doubs department in the Bourgogne-Franche-Comté region in eastern France.

== Geography ==
Solemont lies 11 km (6.8 mi) from Pont-de-Roide near the cliffs of the Mont de Solemont. It is near the valley of the Barbèche.

== Population ==
Historical population
Year	Pop.	±% p.a.
1968	99	—
1975	68	−5.22%
1982	178	+14.74%
1990	207	+1.90%
1999	185	−1.24%
2007	145	−3.00%
2012	154	+1.21%
2017	150	−0.52%
2023	131	−2.23%
Source: INSEE

== See also ==
- Communes of the Doubs department
