= Goux-lès-Dambelin =

- Commune
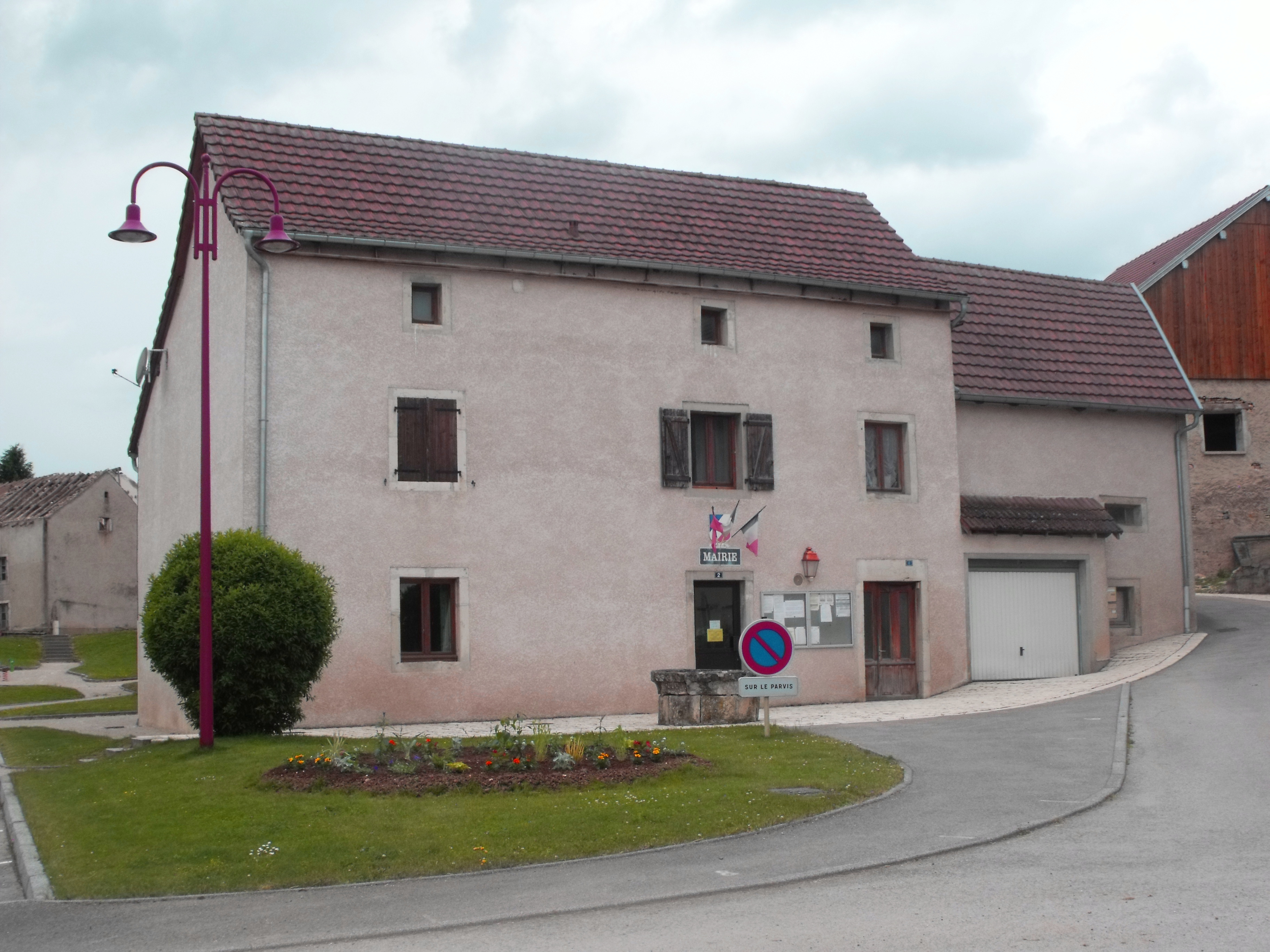
- The town hall in Goux-lès-Dambelin
- Location of Goux-lès-Dambelin
- Location within France Location within Bourgogne-Franche-Comté
- Coordinates: 47°23′51″N 6°40′19″E
- Country: France
- Region: Bourgogne-Franche-Comté
- Department: Doubs
- Arrondissement: Montbéliard
- Canton: Valentigney
- Intercommunality: Pays de Montbéliard Agglomération

Government
  - Mayor (2020–2026): Daniel Mornard
- Area^{1}: 8.9 km^{2} (3.4 sq mi)
- Highest elevation: 591 m (1,939 ft)
- Lowest elevation: 400 m (1,300 ft)
- Population (2023): 270
  - Density: 30/km^{2} (79/sq mi)
- Time zone: UTC+01:00 (CET)
  - Summer (DST): UTC+02:00 (CEST)
- INSEE/Postal code: 25281 /25150
- ^{1} French Land Register data, which excludes lakes, ponds, glaciers > 1 km^{2} (0.386 sq mi or 247 acres) and river estuaries.

Goux-lès-Dambelin (French pronunciation: [ɡu lɛ dɑ̃blɛ̃], literally Goux near Dambelin) is a commune in the Doubs department in the Bourgogne-Franche-Comté region in eastern France.

== Population ==
Historical population
Year	Pop.	±% p.a.
1968	163	—
1975	165	+0.17%
1982	167	+0.17%
1990	220	+3.51%
1999	232	+0.59%
2007	264	+1.63%
2012	269	+0.38%
2017	285	+1.16%
2023	270	−0.90%
Source: INSEE

== See also ==
- Dambelin
- Communes of the Doubs department
