= Mathay =

- Commune
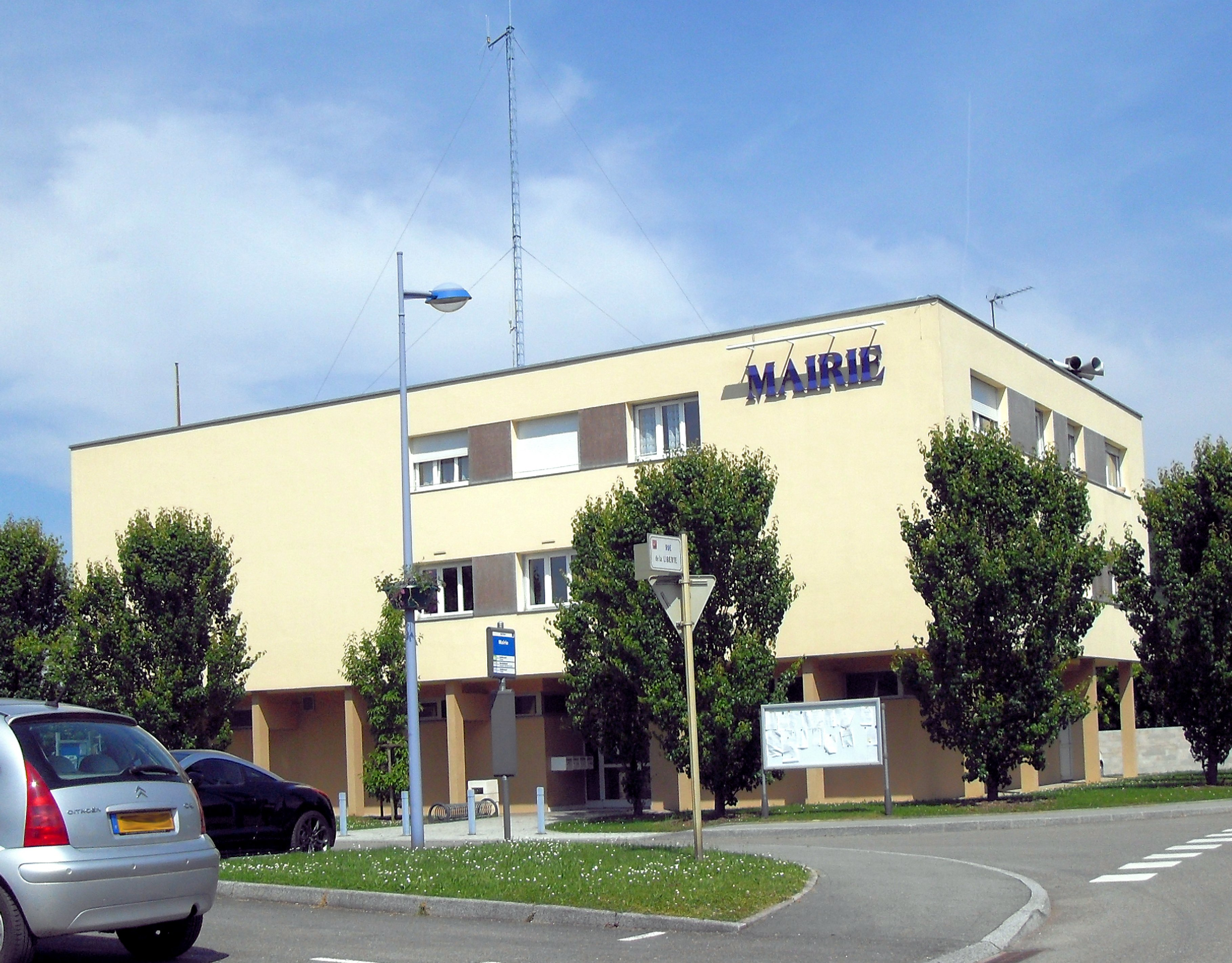
- Town hall

- Coat of arms
- Location of Mathay
- Location within France Location within Bourgogne-Franche-Comté
- Coordinates: 47°26′16″N 6°47′02″E
- Country: France
- Region: Bourgogne-Franche-Comté
- Department: Doubs
- Arrondissement: Montbéliard
- Canton: Valentigney
- Intercommunality: Pays de Montbéliard Agglomération

Government
  - Mayor (2020–2026): Daniel Granjon
- Area^{1}: 14.85 km^{2} (5.73 sq mi)
- Highest elevation: 551 m (1,808 ft)
- Lowest elevation: 330 m (1,080 ft)
- Population (2023): 2,115
  - Density: 142.4/km^{2} (368.9/sq mi)
- Time zone: UTC+01:00 (CET)
  - Summer (DST): UTC+02:00 (CEST)
- INSEE/Postal code: 25370 /25700
- ^{1} French Land Register data, which excludes lakes, ponds, glaciers > 1 km^{2} (0.386 sq mi or 247 acres) and river estuaries.

Mathay (French pronunciation: [matɛ]) is a commune in the Doubs department in the Bourgogne-Franche-Comté region in eastern France.

== Geography ==
Mathay lies 6 km (3.7 mi) north of Pont-de-Roide.

== Population ==
Historical population
Year	Pop.	±% p.a.
1968	1,360	—
1975	1,482	+1.23%
1982	1,634	+1.40%
1990	1,960	+2.30%
1999	1,988	+0.16%
2007	2,137	+0.91%
2012	2,158	+0.20%
2017	2,158	+0.00%
2023	2,115	−0.33%
Source: INSEE

== See also ==
- Communes of the Doubs department
