= Feule =

- Commune
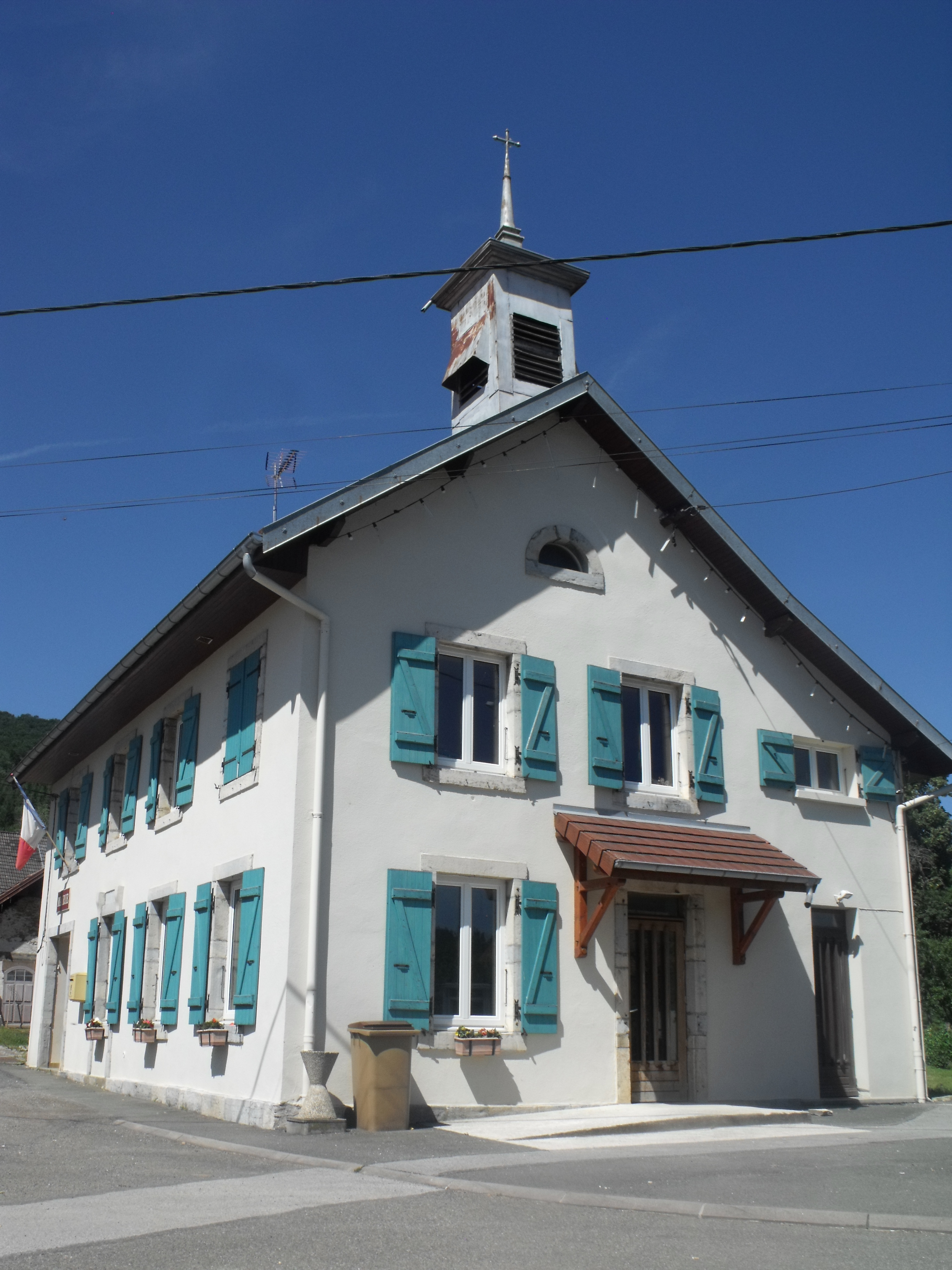
- The town hall in Feule
- Location of Feule
- Location within France Location within Bourgogne-Franche-Comté
- Coordinates: 47°20′44″N 6°44′02″E
- Country: France
- Region: Bourgogne-Franche-Comté
- Department: Doubs
- Arrondissement: Montbéliard
- Canton: Valentigney
- Intercommunality: Pays de Montbéliard Agglomération

Government
  - Mayor (2020–2026): José Antunes
- Area^{1}: 3.76 km^{2} (1.45 sq mi)
- Highest elevation: 813 m (2,667 ft)
- Lowest elevation: 376 m (1,234 ft)
- Population (2023): 190
  - Density: 51/km^{2} (130/sq mi)
- Time zone: UTC+01:00 (CET)
  - Summer (DST): UTC+02:00 (CEST)
- INSEE/Postal code: 25239 /25190
- ^{1} French Land Register data, which excludes lakes, ponds, glaciers > 1 km^{2} (0.386 sq mi or 247 acres) and river estuaries.

Feule (French pronunciation: [fœl]) is a commune in the Doubs department in the Bourgogne-Franche-Comté region in eastern France.

== Population ==
Historical population
Year	Pop.	±% p.a.
1968	88	—
1975	206	+12.92%
1982	195	−0.78%
1990	180	−1.00%
1999	163	−1.10%
2007	172	+0.67%
2012	185	+1.47%
2017	180	−0.55%
2023	190	+0.91%
Source: INSEE

== See also ==
- Communes of the Doubs department
