= Villars-sous-Dampjoux =

- Commune
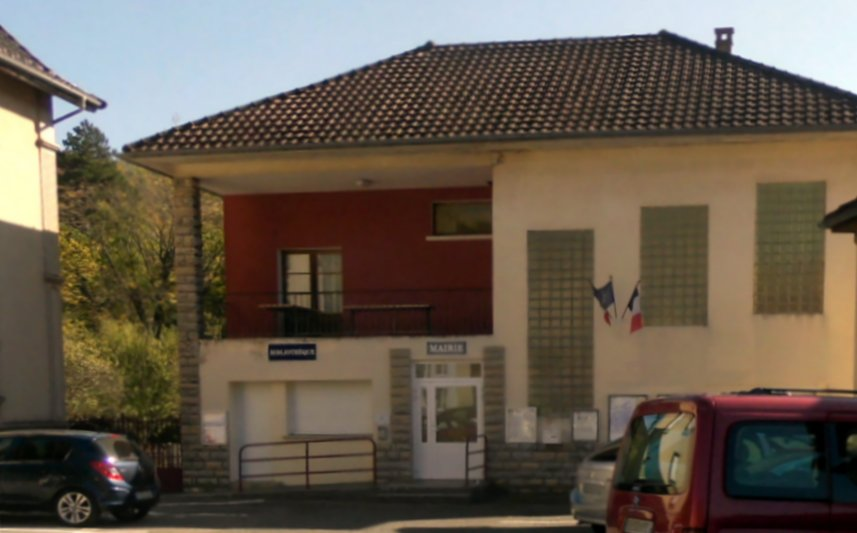
- The town hall in Villars-sous-Dampjoux
- Location of Villars-sous-Dampjoux
- Location within France Location within Bourgogne-Franche-Comté
- Coordinates: 47°21′00″N 6°45′27″E
- Country: France
- Region: Bourgogne-Franche-Comté
- Department: Doubs
- Arrondissement: Montbéliard
- Canton: Valentigney
- Intercommunality: Pays de Montbéliard Agglomération

Government
  - Mayor (2020–2026): Patrick Lechine
- Area^{1}: 3.06 km^{2} (1.18 sq mi)
- Highest elevation: 723 m (2,372 ft)
- Lowest elevation: 348 m (1,142 ft)
- Population (2023): 350
  - Density: 110/km^{2} (300/sq mi)
- Time zone: UTC+01:00 (CET)
  - Summer (DST): UTC+02:00 (CEST)
- INSEE/Postal code: 25617 /25190
- ^{1} French Land Register data, which excludes lakes, ponds, glaciers > 1 km^{2} (0.386 sq mi or 247 acres) and river estuaries.

Villars-sous-Dampjoux (French pronunciation: [vilaʁ su dɑ̃ʒu], literally Villars under Dampjoux) is a commune in the Doubs department in the Bourgogne-Franche-Comté region in eastern France.

== Population ==
Historical population
Year	Pop.	±% p.a.
1968	272	—
1975	313	+2.03%
1982	393	+3.30%
1990	422	+0.89%
1999	403	−0.51%
2007	389	−0.44%
2012	396	+0.36%
2017	356	−2.11%
2023	350	−0.28%
Source: INSEE

== See also ==
- Dampjoux
- Communes of the Doubs department
