= Canton of Valentigney =

Division of Doubs department, France

Coordinates: 47.46°N 6.83°E

The canton of Valentigney is an administrative division of the Doubs department, eastern France. Its borders were modified at the French canton reorganisation which came into effect in March 2015. Its seat is in Valentigney.

It consists of the following communes:

1. Bourguignon
2. Dambelin
3. Écot
4. Feule
5. Goux-lès-Dambelin
6. Mandeure
7. Mathay
8. Neuchâtel-Urtière
9. Noirefontaine
10. Pont-de-Roide-Vermondans
11. Rémondans-Vaivre
12. Solemont
13. Valentigney
14. Villars-sous-Dampjoux
15. Voujeaucourt
