= Voujeaucourt =

- Commune
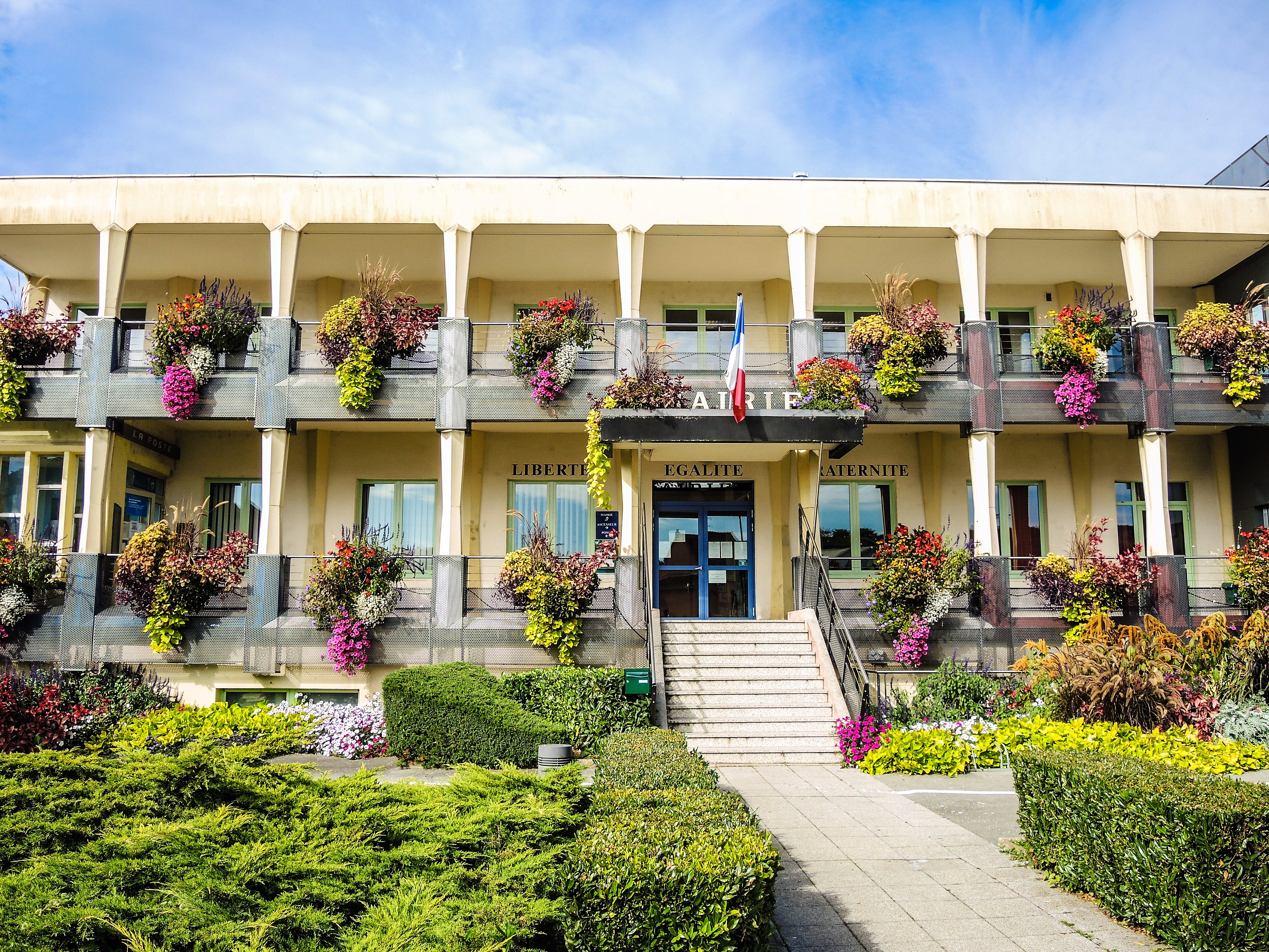
- The town hall in Voujeaucourt

- Coat of arms
- Location of Voujeaucourt
- Location within France Location within Bourgogne-Franche-Comté
- Coordinates: 47°28′34″N 6°46′30″E
- Country: France
- Region: Bourgogne-Franche-Comté
- Department: Doubs
- Arrondissement: Montbéliard
- Canton: Valentigney
- Intercommunality: Pays de Montbéliard

Government
  - Mayor (2020–2026): Martine Voidey
- Area^{1}: 9.45 km^{2} (3.65 sq mi)
- Highest elevation: 416 m (1,365 ft)
- Lowest elevation: 305 m (1,001 ft)
- Population (2023): 3,174
  - Density: 336/km^{2} (870/sq mi)
- Time zone: UTC+01:00 (CET)
  - Summer (DST): UTC+02:00 (CEST)
- INSEE/Postal code: 25632 /25420
- ^{1} French Land Register data, which excludes lakes, ponds, glaciers > 1 km^{2} (0.386 sq mi or 247 acres) and river estuaries.

Voujeaucourt (French pronunciation: [vuʒokuʁ]) is a commune in the Doubs department in the Bourgogne-Franche-Comté region in eastern France.

== Population ==
Historical population
Year	Pop.	±% p.a.
1968	2,907	—
1975	2,959	+0.25%
1982	2,775	−0.91%
1990	3,176	+1.70%
1999	3,195	+0.07%
2007	3,396	+0.77%
2012	3,418	+0.13%
2017	3,175	−1.46%
2023	3,174	−0.01%
Source: INSEE

== See also ==
- Communes of the Doubs department
