= Bourguignon, Doubs =

Bourguignon
- Commune
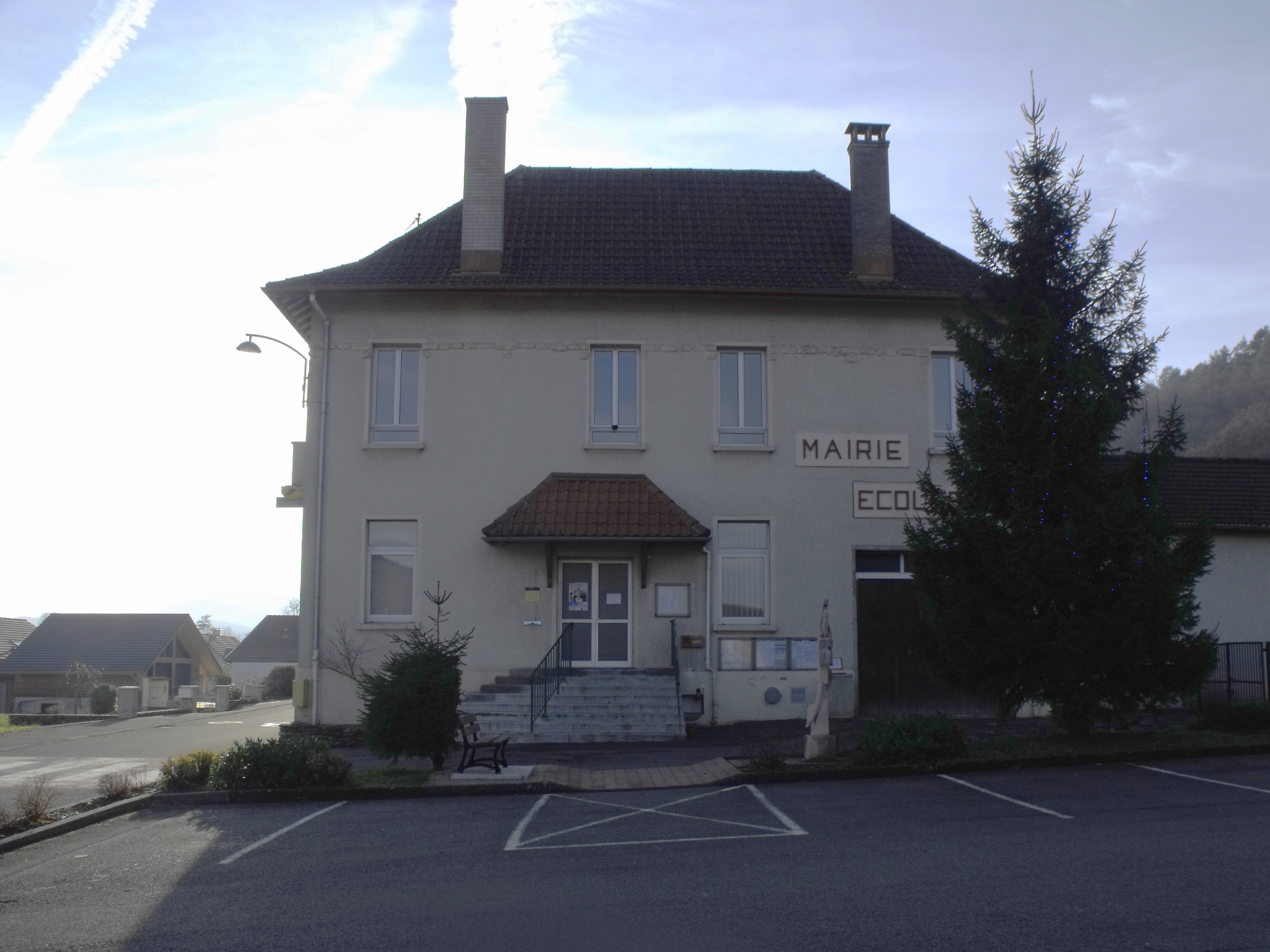
- The town hall in Bourguignon
- Location of Bourguignon
- Location within France Location within Bourgogne-Franche-Comté
- Coordinates: 47°24′51″N 6°46′50″E
- Country: France
- Region: Bourgogne-Franche-Comté
- Department: Doubs
- Arrondissement: Montbéliard
- Canton: Valentigney
- Intercommunality: Pays de Montbéliard Agglomération

Government
  - Mayor (2020–2026): Jean-Louis Noris
- Area^{1}: 5.56 km^{2} (2.15 sq mi)
- Highest elevation: 564 m (1,850 ft)
- Lowest elevation: 337 m (1,106 ft)
- Population (2023): 876
  - Density: 158/km^{2} (408/sq mi)
- Time zone: UTC+01:00 (CET)
  - Summer (DST): UTC+02:00 (CEST)
- INSEE/Postal code: 25082 /25150
- ^{1} French Land Register data, which excludes lakes, ponds, glaciers > 1 km^{2} (0.386 sq mi or 247 acres) and river estuaries.

Bourguignon (French pronunciation: [buʁɡiɲɔ̃]) is a commune in the Doubs department in the Bourgogne-Franche-Comté region in eastern France.

== Population ==
Historical population
| Year | Pop. | ±% p.a. |
|---|---|---|
| 1968 | 653 | — |
| 1975 | 770 | +2.38% |
| 1982 | 754 | −0.30% |
| 1990 | 824 | +1.12% |
| 1999 | 903 | +1.02% |
| 2007 | 938 | +0.48% |
| 2012 | 959 | +0.44% |
| 2017 | 914 | −0.96% |
| 2023 | 876 | −0.71% |
Source: INSEE

== See also ==
- Communes of the Doubs department
