= Dambelin =

- Commune
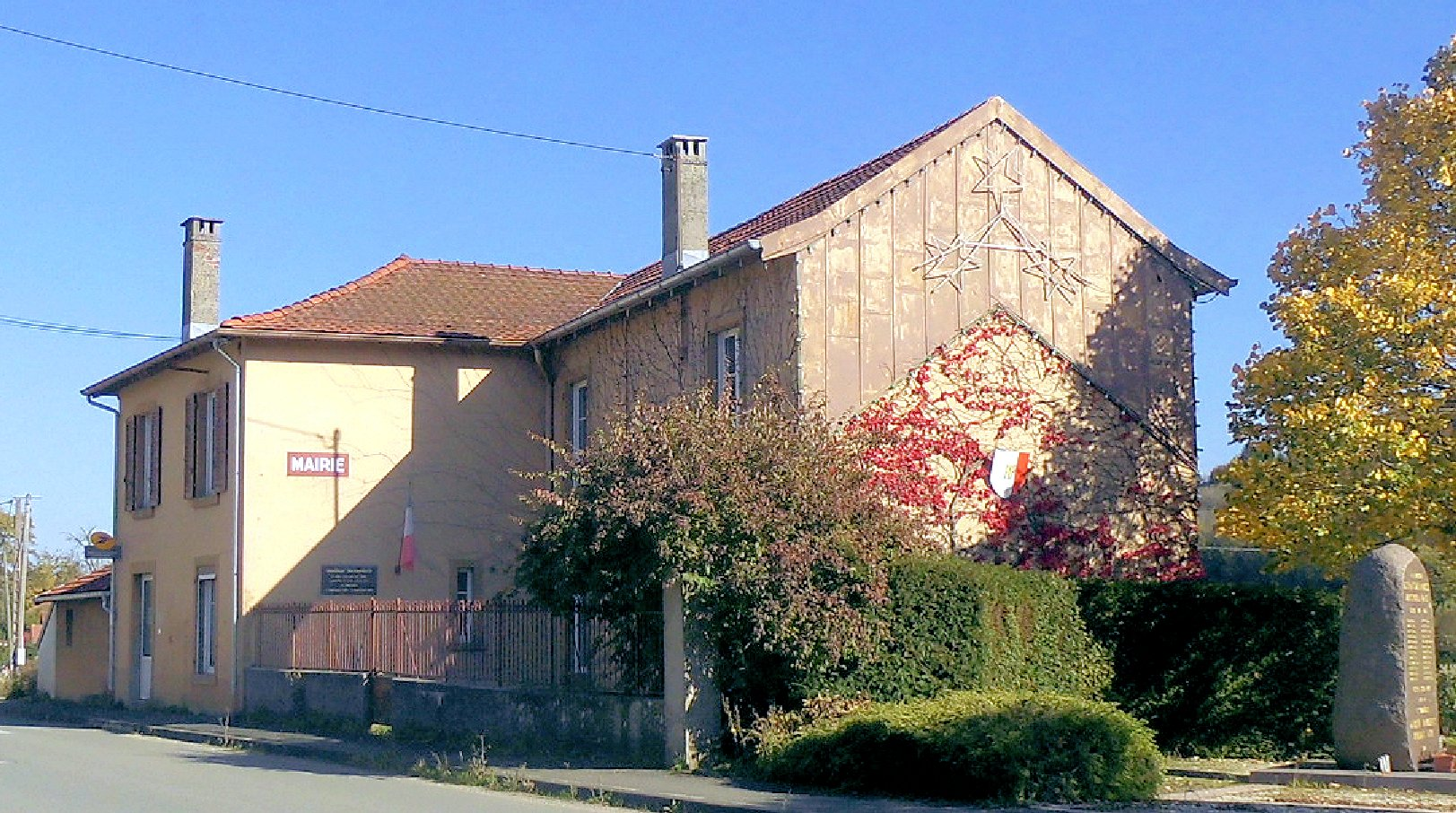
- The town hall in Dambelin

- Coat of arms
- Location of Dambelin
- Location within France Location within Bourgogne-Franche-Comté
- Coordinates: 47°22′33″N 6°40′35″E
- Country: France
- Region: Bourgogne-Franche-Comté
- Department: Doubs
- Arrondissement: Montbéliard
- Canton: Valentigney
- Intercommunality: Pays de Montbéliard Agglomération

Government
  - Mayor (2020–2026): Christophe Dalongeville
- Area^{1}: 12.43 km^{2} (4.80 sq mi)
- Highest elevation: 815 m (2,674 ft)
- Lowest elevation: 397 m (1,302 ft)
- Population (2023): 512
  - Density: 41.2/km^{2} (107/sq mi)
- Time zone: UTC+01:00 (CET)
  - Summer (DST): UTC+02:00 (CEST)
- INSEE/Postal code: 25187 /25150
- ^{1} French Land Register data, which excludes lakes, ponds, glaciers > 1 km^{2} (0.386 sq mi or 247 acres) and river estuaries.

Dambelin (French pronunciation: [dɑ̃blɛ̃], before 1995: Mambelin) is a commune in the Doubs department in the Bourgogne-Franche-Comté region in eastern France.

== Population ==
Historical population
Year	Pop.	±% p.a.
1968	354	—
1975	368	+0.56%
1982	405	+1.38%
1990	403	−0.06%
1999	386	−0.48%
2007	472	+2.55%
2012	482	+0.42%
2017	495	+0.53%
2023	512	+0.56%
Source: INSEE

== See also ==
- Communes of the Doubs department
