= Pont-de-Roide-Vermondans =

- Commune
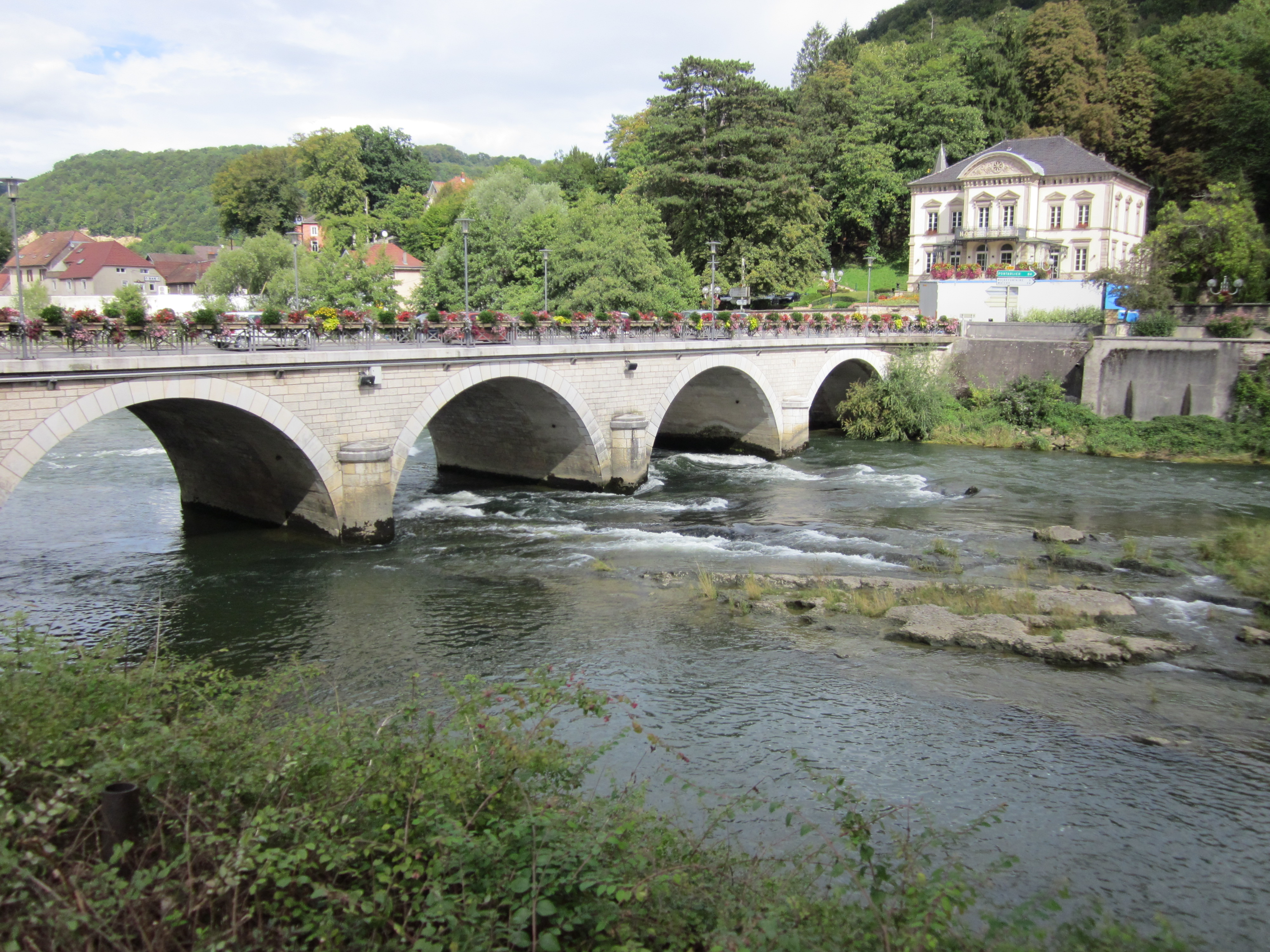
- Bridge over the Doubs

- Coat of arms
- Location of Pont-de-Roide-Vermondans
- Location within France Location within Bourgogne-Franche-Comté
- Coordinates: 47°23′07″N 6°46′15″E
- Country: France
- Region: Bourgogne-Franche-Comté
- Department: Doubs
- Arrondissement: Montbéliard
- Canton: Valentigney
- Intercommunality: Pays de Montbéliard Agglomération

Government
  - Mayor (2020–2026): Denis Arnoux
- Area^{1}: 13.58 km^{2} (5.24 sq mi)
- Highest elevation: 817 m (2,680 ft)
- Lowest elevation: 344 m (1,129 ft)
- Population (2023): 3,912
  - Density: 288.1/km^{2} (746.1/sq mi)
- Time zone: UTC+01:00 (CET)
  - Summer (DST): UTC+02:00 (CEST)
- INSEE/Postal code: 25463 /25150
- ^{1} French Land Register data, which excludes lakes, ponds, glaciers > 1 km^{2} (0.386 sq mi or 247 acres) and river estuaries.

Pont-de-Roide-Vermondans (French pronunciation: [pɔ̃ də ʁwad vɛʁmɔ̃dɑ̃]; before 2014: Pont-de-Roide) is a commune in the Doubs département in the Bourgogne-Franche-Comté region in eastern France.

== Geography ==
The town is at the heart of the Pays de Lomont, 17 km (11 mi) from Montbéliard at the confluence of the rivers Doubs, Ranceuse, and Roide; it is therefore located at the crossroad of different valleys. On the east end of the town are high cliffs known as les Roches, leading to a plateau near the Franco-Swiss border.

== History ==
In 1973, the adjacent village of Vermondans joined the commune of Pont-de-Roide. In 2013 the fusion was made official by the creation of a new commune: Pont-de-Roide - Vermondans.

== Population ==
Population data refer to the commune in its geography as of January 2025.

Historical population
| Year | Pop. | ±% p.a. |
|---|---|---|
| 1968 | 5,261 | — |
| 1975 | 5,342 | +0.22% |
| 1982 | 4,958 | −1.06% |
| 1990 | 4,983 | +0.06% |
| 1999 | 4,781 | −0.46% |
| 2007 | 4,619 | −0.43% |
| 2012 | 4,309 | −1.38% |
| 2017 | 4,185 | −0.58% |
| 2023 | 3,912 | −1.12% |
Source: INSEE

== See also ==
- Communes of the Doubs department
- US Pont-de-Roide
- Armand Machabey (1886–1966), musicologist, born in Pont-de-Roide-Vermondans
