= Courtefontaine =

Courtefontaine may refer to two communes in the French region of Franche-Comté:

- Courtefontaine, Doubs
- Courtefontaine, Jura
