= Meslières =

- Commune
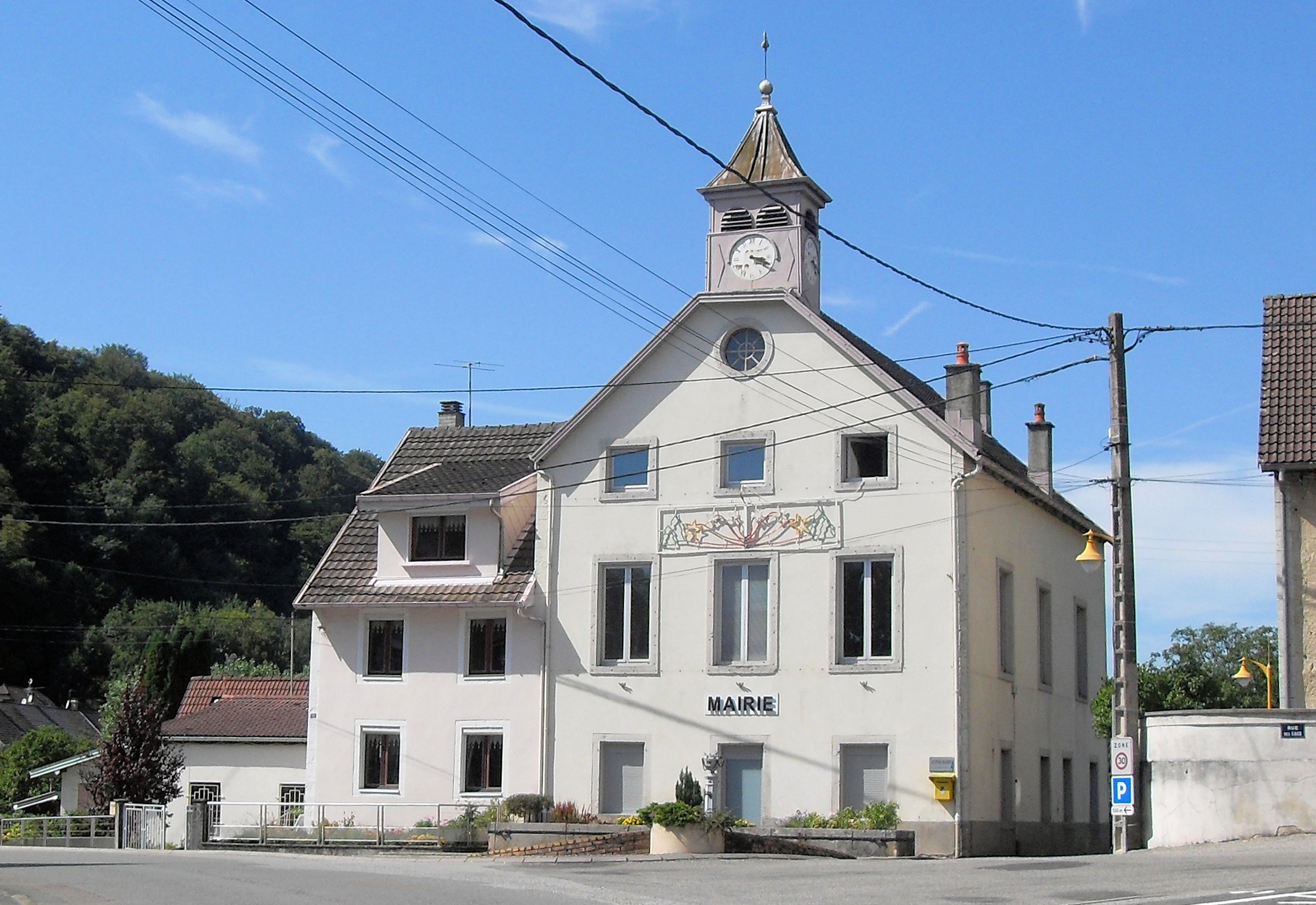
- The town hall in Meslières

- Coat of arms
- Location of Meslières
- Location within France Location within Bourgogne-Franche-Comté
- Coordinates: 47°25′05″N 6°53′19″E
- Country: France
- Region: Bourgogne-Franche-Comté
- Department: Doubs
- Arrondissement: Montbéliard
- Canton: Maîche
- Intercommunality: Pays de Montbéliard Agglomération

Government
  - Mayor (2020–2026): Christian Methot
- Area^{1}: 2.99 km^{2} (1.15 sq mi)
- Highest elevation: 577 m (1,893 ft)
- Lowest elevation: 374 m (1,227 ft)
- Population (2023): 323
  - Density: 108/km^{2} (280/sq mi)
- Time zone: UTC+01:00 (CET)
  - Summer (DST): UTC+02:00 (CEST)
- INSEE/Postal code: 25378 /25310
- ^{1} French Land Register data, which excludes lakes, ponds, glaciers > 1 km^{2} (0.386 sq mi or 247 acres) and river estuaries.

Meslières (French pronunciation: [mɛljɛʁ]) is a commune in the Doubs département in the Bourgogne-Franche-Comté region in eastern France.

== Geography ==
The commune lies 3 km (1.9 mi) south of Hérimoncourt. The population is divided between the valley of the Gland River and the plateau.

== Population ==
Historical population
Year	Pop.	±% p.a.
1968	350	—
1975	340	−0.41%
1982	388	+1.90%
1990	375	−0.43%
1999	353	−0.67%
2007	352	−0.04%
2012	362	+0.56%
2017	361	−0.06%
2023	323	−1.84%
Source: INSEE

== See also ==
- Communes of the Doubs department
