= Urtière =

- Commune
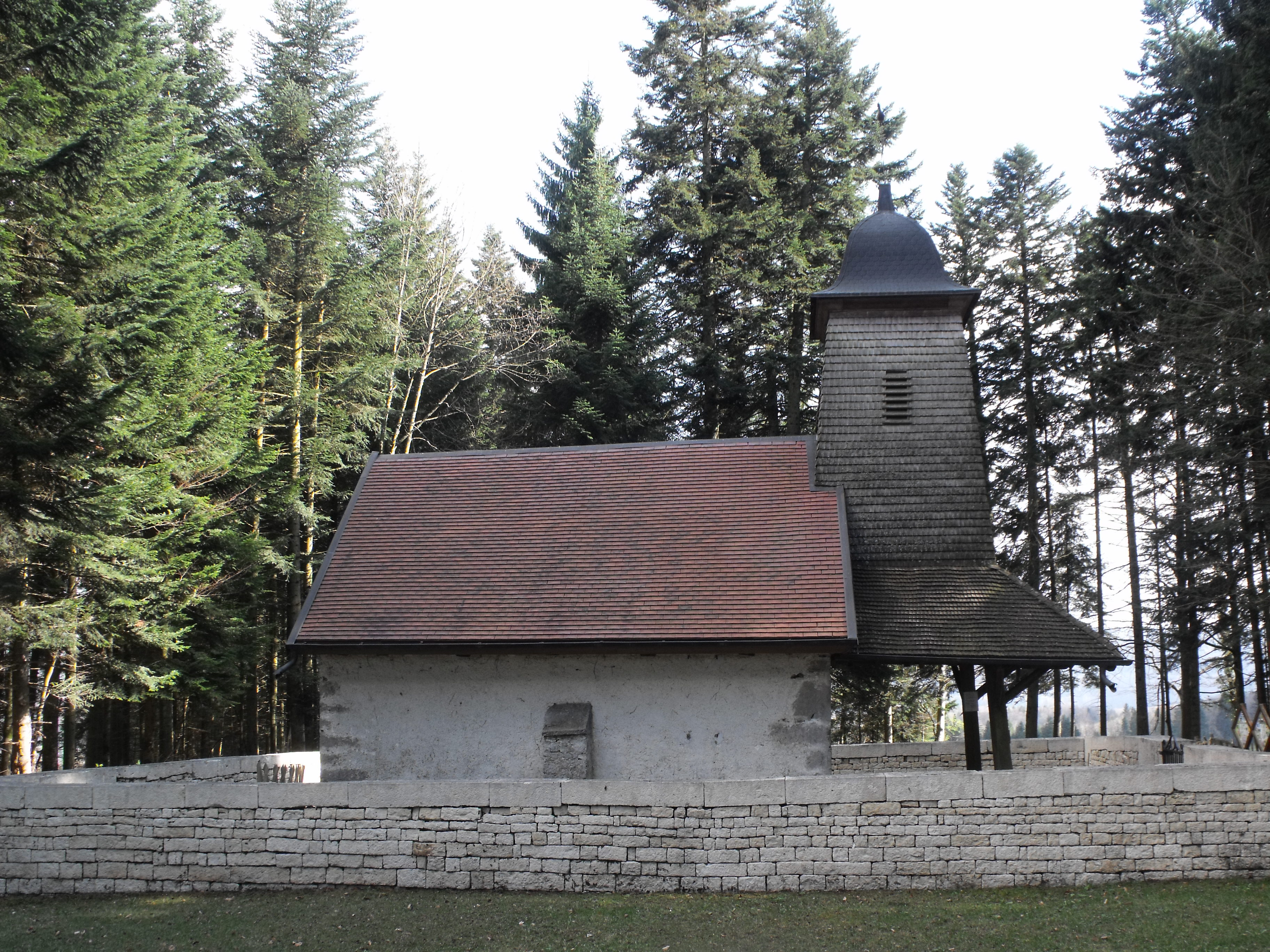
- The chapel in Urtière
- Location of Urtière
- Location within France Location within Bourgogne-Franche-Comté
- Coordinates: 47°15′31″N 6°55′35″E
- Country: France
- Region: Bourgogne-Franche-Comté
- Department: Doubs
- Arrondissement: Montbéliard
- Canton: Maîche
- Intercommunality: Pays de Maîche

Government
  - Mayor (2020–2026): Christian Garressus
- Area^{1}: 2.15 km^{2} (0.83 sq mi)
- Highest elevation: 988 m (3,241 ft)
- Lowest elevation: 816 m (2,677 ft)
- Population (2023): 15
  - Density: 7.0/km^{2} (18/sq mi)
- Time zone: UTC+01:00 (CET)
  - Summer (DST): UTC+02:00 (CEST)
- INSEE/Postal code: 25573 /25470
- ^{1} French Land Register data, which excludes lakes, ponds, glaciers > 1 km^{2} (0.386 sq mi or 247 acres) and river estuaries.

Urtière is a commune in the Doubs department in the Bourgogne-Franche-Comté region in eastern France.

== Population ==
Historical population
Year	Pop.	±% p.a.
1968	18	—
1975	15	−2.57%
1982	17	+1.80%
1990	9	−7.64%
1999	6	−4.41%
2007	8	+3.66%
2012	8	+0.00%
2017	11	+6.58%
2023	15	+5.31%
Source: INSEE

== See also ==
- Communes of the Doubs department
