= Belfays =

- Commune
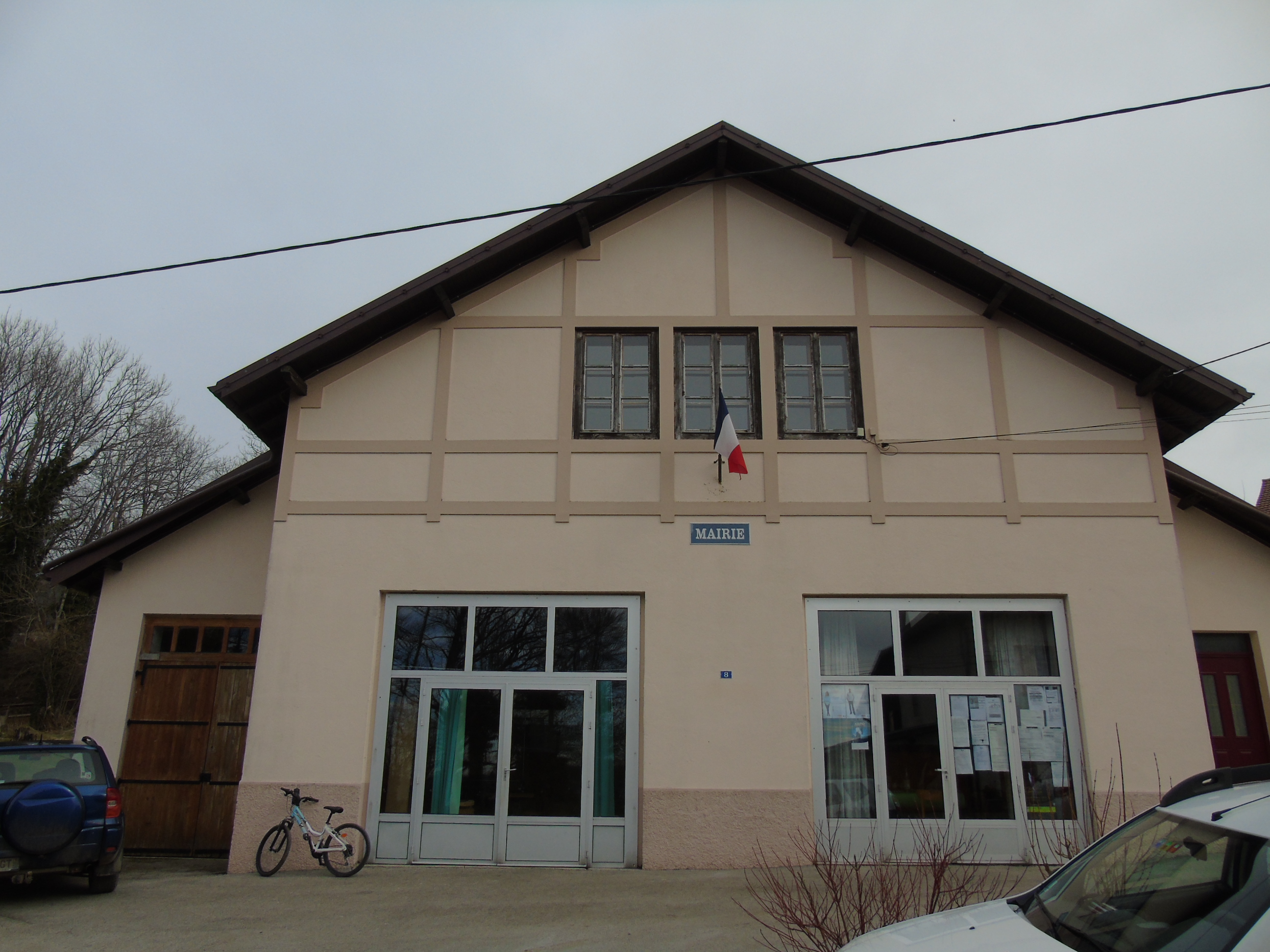
- The town hall in Belfays

- Coat of arms
- Location of Belfays
- Location within France Location within Bourgogne-Franche-Comté
- Coordinates: 47°15′36″N 6°53′49″E
- Country: France
- Region: Bourgogne-Franche-Comté
- Department: Doubs
- Arrondissement: Montbéliard
- Canton: Maîche

Government
  - Mayor (2020–2026): Sébastien Parent
- Area^{1}: 3.2 km^{2} (1.2 sq mi)
- Highest elevation: 980 m (3,220 ft)
- Lowest elevation: 795 m (2,608 ft)
- Population (2023): 127
  - Density: 40/km^{2} (100/sq mi)
- Time zone: UTC+01:00 (CET)
  - Summer (DST): UTC+02:00 (CEST)
- INSEE/Postal code: 25049 /25470
- ^{1} French Land Register data, which excludes lakes, ponds, glaciers > 1 km^{2} (0.386 sq mi or 247 acres) and river estuaries.

Belfays (French pronunciation: [bɛlfɛj]) is a commune in the Doubs department in the Bourgogne-Franche-Comté region in eastern France.

== Population ==
Historical population
Year	Pop.	±% p.a.
1968	63	—
1975	51	−2.97%
1982	78	+6.26%
1990	78	+0.00%
1999	81	+0.42%
2007	102	+2.92%
2012	121	+3.48%
2017	138	+2.66%
2023	127	−1.37%
Source: INSEE

== See also ==
- Communes of the Doubs department
