= Fessevillers =

- Commune
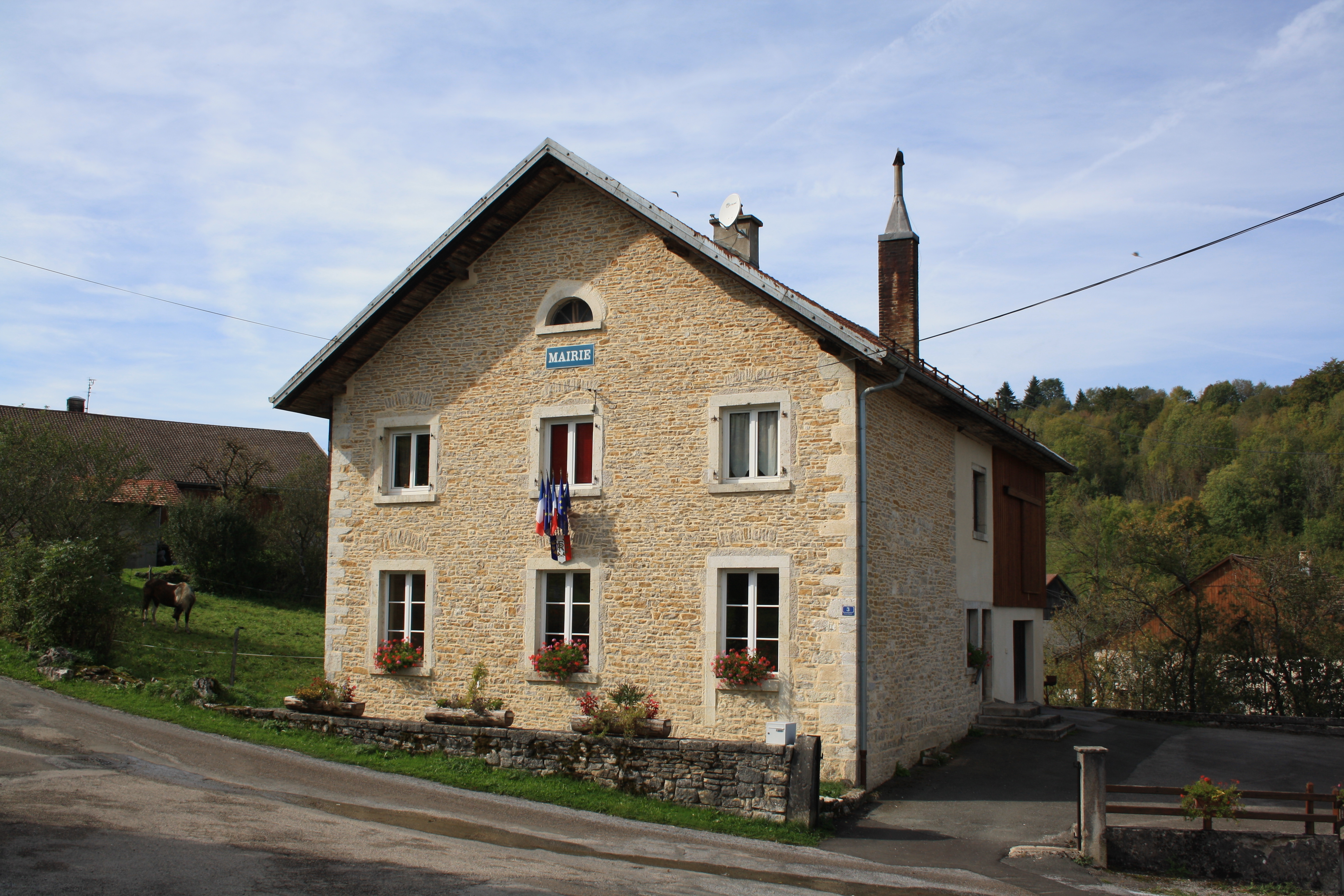
- The town hall in Fessevillers

- Coat of arms
- Location of Fessevillers
- Location within France Location within Bourgogne-Franche-Comté
- Coordinates: 47°16′52″N 6°54′54″E
- Country: France
- Region: Bourgogne-Franche-Comté
- Department: Doubs
- Arrondissement: Montbéliard
- Canton: Maîche

Government
  - Mayor (2020–2026): Thierry Verney
- Area^{1}: 6.16 km^{2} (2.38 sq mi)
- Highest elevation: 975 m (3,199 ft)
- Lowest elevation: 485 m (1,591 ft)
- Population (2023): 161
  - Density: 26.1/km^{2} (67.7/sq mi)
- Time zone: UTC+01:00 (CET)
  - Summer (DST): UTC+02:00 (CEST)
- INSEE/Postal code: 25238 /25470
- ^{1} French Land Register data, which excludes lakes, ponds, glaciers > 1 km^{2} (0.386 sq mi or 247 acres) and river estuaries.

Fessevillers is a commune in the Doubs department in the Bourgogne-Franche-Comté region in eastern France.

== Population ==
Historical population
Year	Pop.	±% p.a.
1968	94	—
1975	91	−0.46%
1982	117	+3.66%
1990	105	−1.34%
1999	139	+3.17%
2007	169	+2.47%
2012	169	+0.00%
2017	158	−1.34%
2023	161	+0.31%
Source: INSEE

== See also ==
- Communes of the Doubs department
