= Charmauvillers =

- Commune
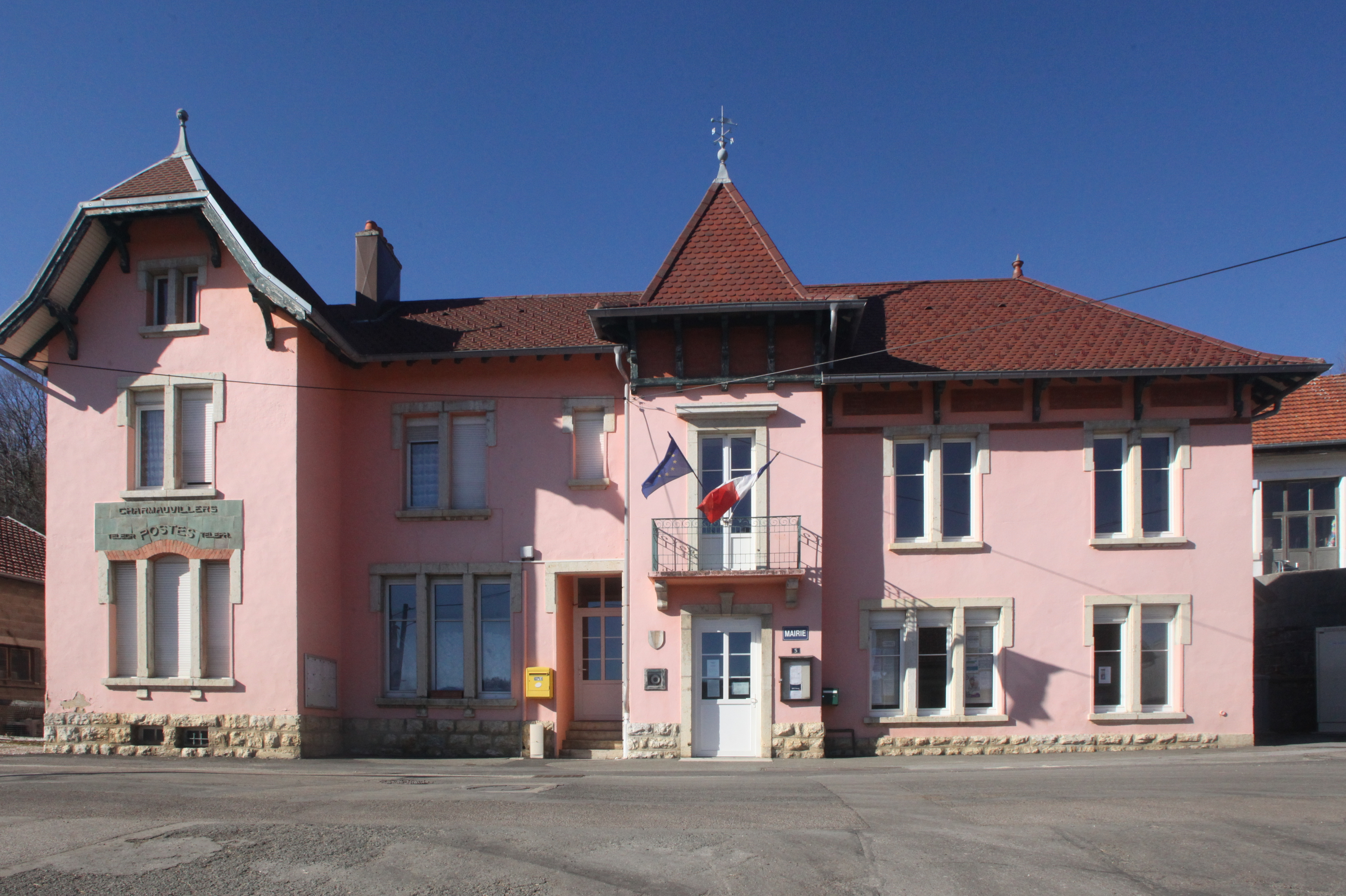
- The town hall in Charmauvillers

- Coat of arms
- Location of Charmauvillers
- Location within France Location within Bourgogne-Franche-Comté
- Coordinates: 47°14′23″N 6°55′09″E
- Country: France
- Region: Bourgogne-Franche-Comté
- Department: Doubs
- Arrondissement: Montbéliard
- Canton: Maîche

Government
  - Mayor (2020–2026): Olivier Clémence
- Area^{1}: 10.47 km^{2} (4.04 sq mi)
- Highest elevation: 1,007 m (3,304 ft)
- Lowest elevation: 500 m (1,600 ft)
- Population (2023): 285
  - Density: 27.2/km^{2} (70.5/sq mi)
- Time zone: UTC+01:00 (CET)
  - Summer (DST): UTC+02:00 (CEST)
- INSEE/Postal code: 25124 /25470
- ^{1} French Land Register data, which excludes lakes, ponds, glaciers > 1 km^{2} (0.386 sq mi or 247 acres) and river estuaries.

Charmauvillers is a commune in the department of Doubs, in the eastern French region of Bourgogne-Franche-Comté.

== Population ==
Historical population
Year	Pop.	±% p.a.
1968	277	—
1975	234	−2.38%
1982	229	−0.31%
1990	189	−2.37%
1999	207	+1.02%
2007	236	+1.65%
2012	285	+3.85%
2017	250	−2.59%
2023	285	+2.21%
Source: INSEE

== See also ==
- Communes of the Doubs department
