= Cernay-l'Église =

- Commune
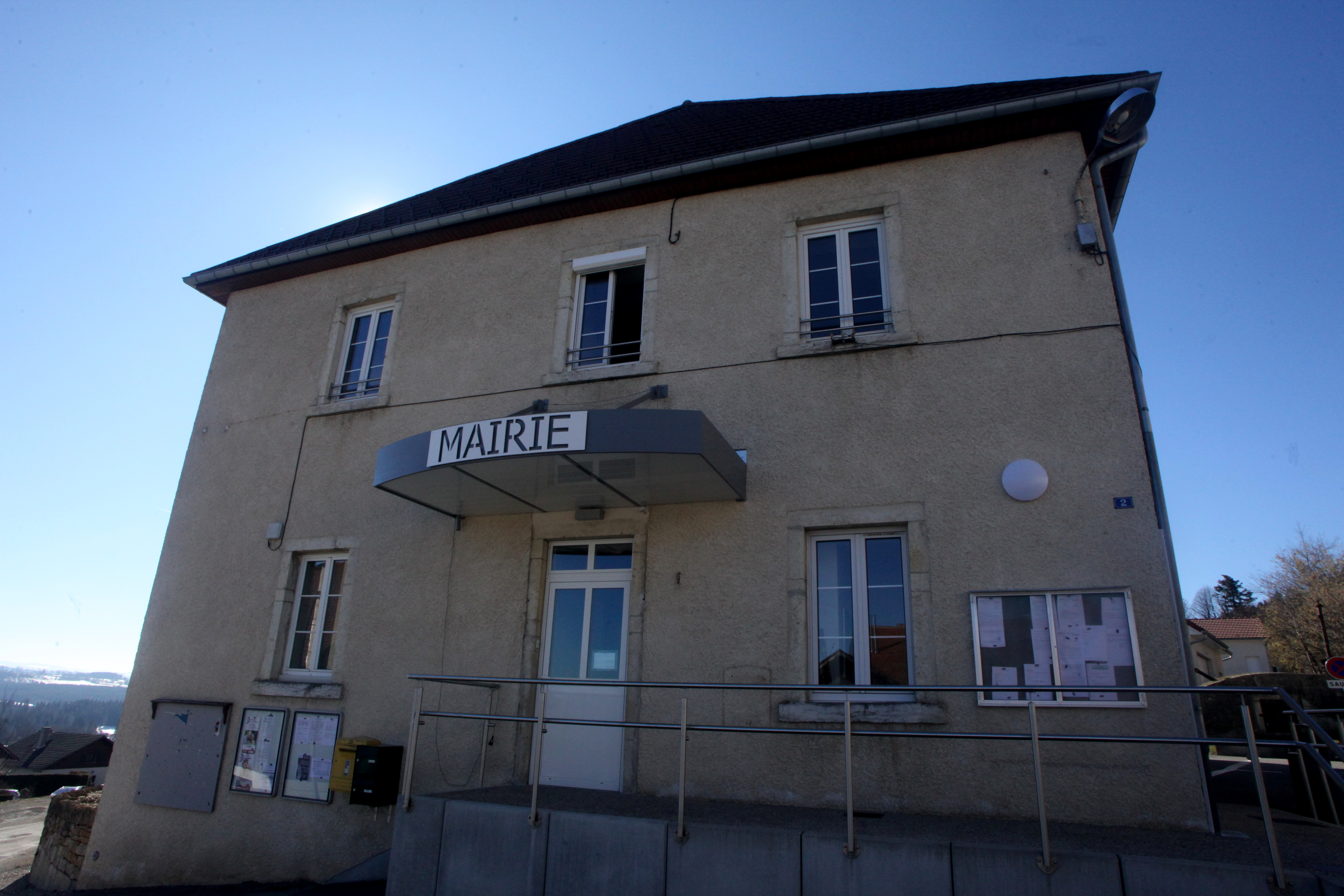
- The town hall in Cernay-l'Église
- Location of Cernay-l'Église
- Location within France Location within Bourgogne-Franche-Comté
- Coordinates: 47°15′28″N 6°49′54″E
- Country: France
- Region: Bourgogne-Franche-Comté
- Department: Doubs
- Arrondissement: Montbéliard
- Canton: Maîche

Government
  - Mayor (2020–2026): Gérard Gentit
- Area^{1}: 5.95 km^{2} (2.30 sq mi)
- Highest elevation: 982 m (3,222 ft)
- Lowest elevation: 787 m (2,582 ft)
- Population (2023): 319
  - Density: 53.6/km^{2} (139/sq mi)
- Time zone: UTC+01:00 (CET)
  - Summer (DST): UTC+02:00 (CEST)
- INSEE/Postal code: 25108 /25120
- ^{1} French Land Register data, which excludes lakes, ponds, glaciers > 1 km^{2} (0.386 sq mi or 247 acres) and river estuaries.

Cernay-l'Église (French pronunciation: [sɛʁnɛ leɡliz]) is a commune in the Doubs department in the Bourgogne-Franche-Comté region in eastern France.

== Population ==
Historical population
Year	Pop.	±% p.a.
1968	117	—
1975	154	+4.00%
1982	225	+5.57%
1990	232	+0.38%
1999	258	+1.19%
2007	253	−0.24%
2012	290	+2.77%
2017	302	+0.81%
2023	319	+0.92%
Source: INSEE

== See also ==
- Communes of the Doubs department
