= Les Bréseux =

- Commune
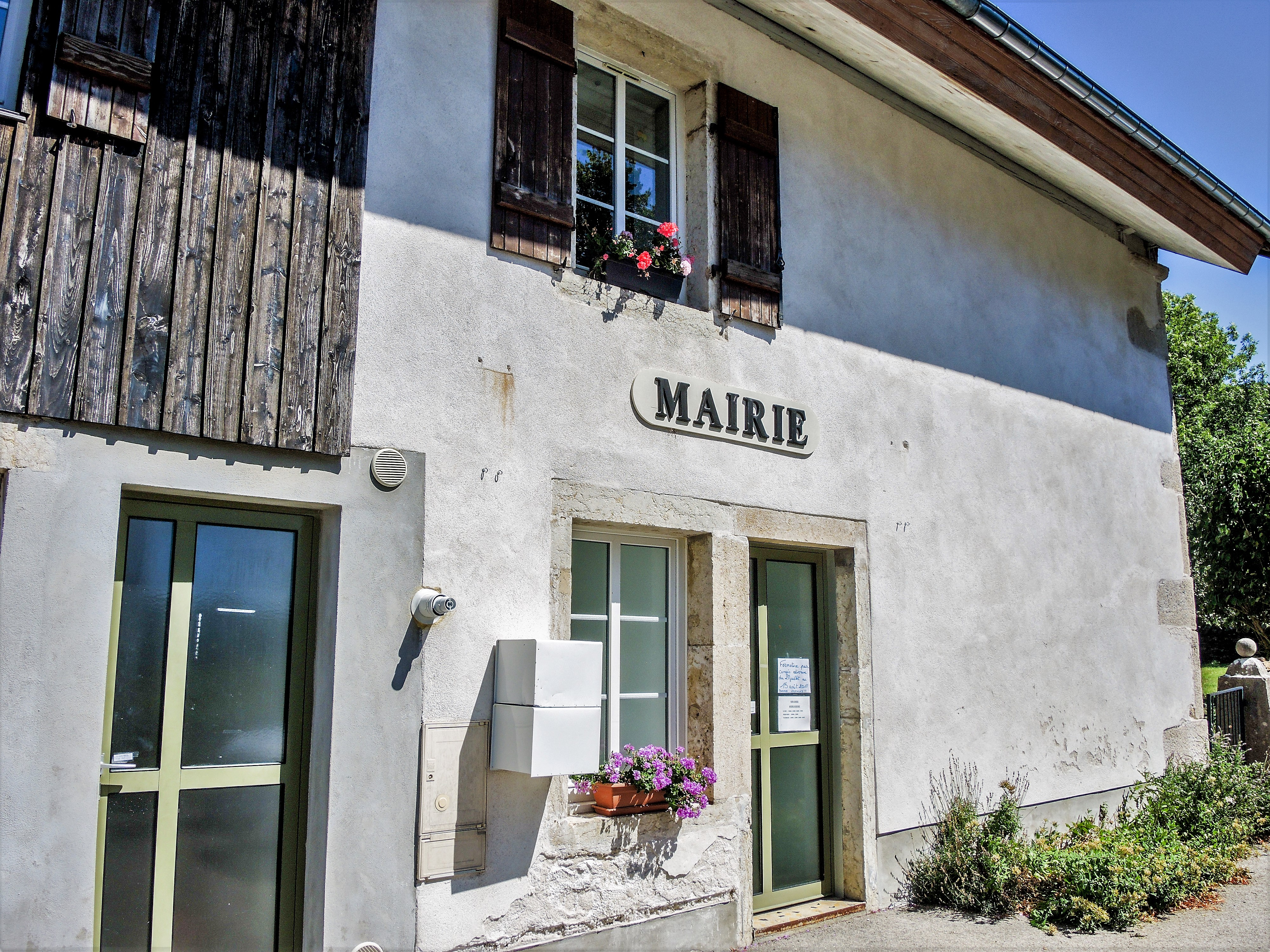
- The town hall in Les Bréseux

- Coat of arms
- Location of Les Bréseux
- Location within France Location within Bourgogne-Franche-Comté
- Coordinates: 47°16′24″N 6°48′39″E
- Country: France
- Region: Bourgogne-Franche-Comté
- Department: Doubs
- Arrondissement: Montbéliard
- Canton: Maîche
- Intercommunality: Pays de Maîche

Government
  - Mayor (2020–2026): Alexandre Monnet
- Area^{1}: 7.37 km^{2} (2.85 sq mi)
- Highest elevation: 910 m (2,990 ft)
- Lowest elevation: 570 m (1,870 ft)
- Population (2023): 494
  - Density: 67.0/km^{2} (174/sq mi)
- Time zone: UTC+01:00 (CET)
  - Summer (DST): UTC+02:00 (CEST)
- INSEE/Postal code: 25091 /25120
- ^{1} French Land Register data, which excludes lakes, ponds, glaciers > 1 km^{2} (0.386 sq mi or 247 acres) and river estuaries.

Les Bréseux (French pronunciation: [le bʁezø]) is a commune in the Doubs department in the Bourgogne-Franche-Comté region in eastern France.

== Population ==
Historical population
Year	Pop.	±% p.a.
1968	255	—
1975	264	+0.50%
1982	294	+1.55%
1990	369	+2.88%
1999	404	+1.01%
2007	417	+0.40%
2012	458	+1.89%
2017	477	+0.82%
2023	494	+0.59%
Source: INSEE

== See also ==
- Communes of the Doubs department
