= Les Terres-de-Chaux =

- Commune
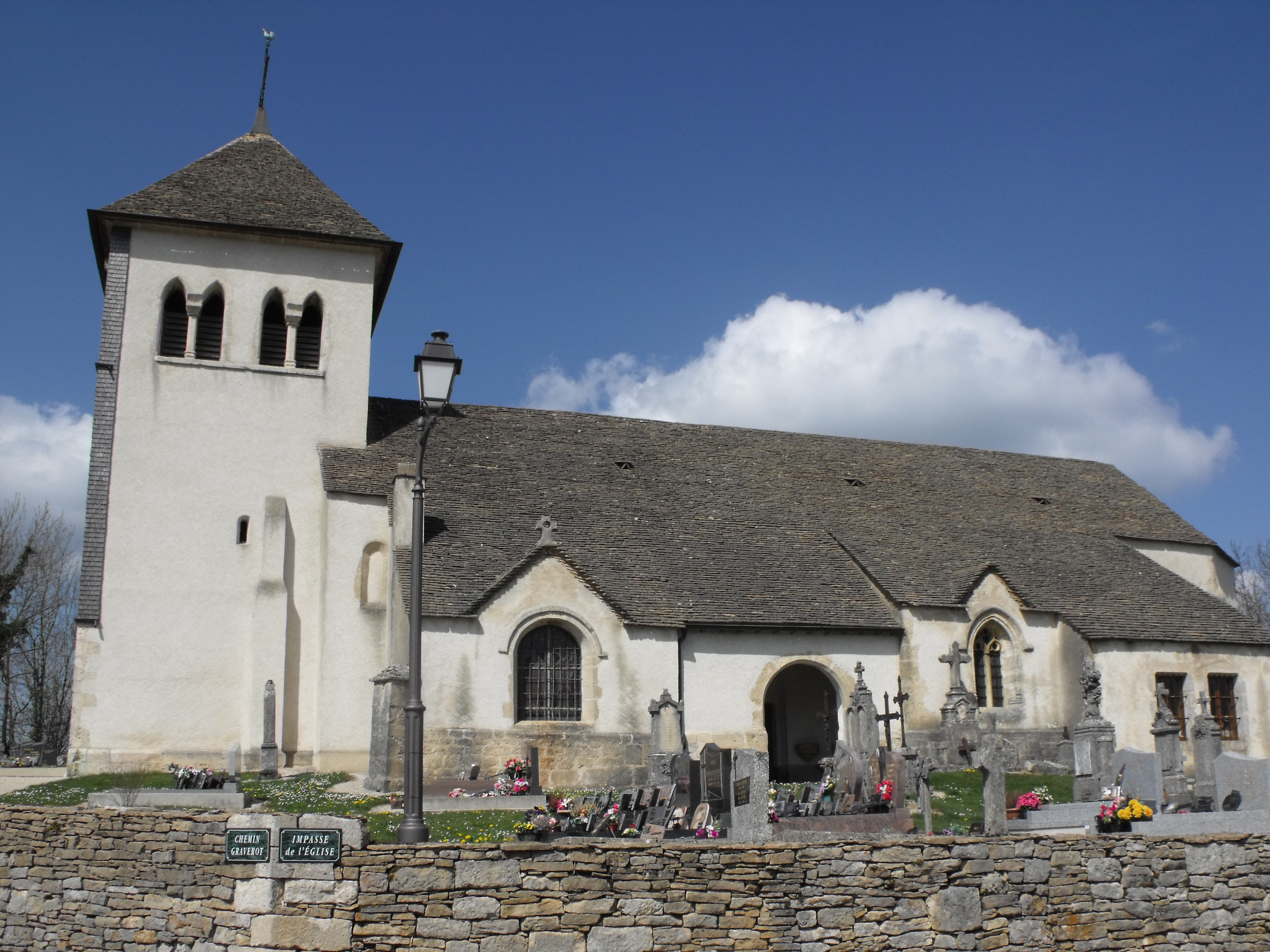
- The church in Chaux-lès-Châtillon

- Coat of arms
- Location of Les Terres-de-Chaux
- Location within France Location within Bourgogne-Franche-Comté
- Coordinates: 47°19′10″N 6°44′19″E
- Country: France
- Region: Bourgogne-Franche-Comté
- Department: Doubs
- Arrondissement: Montbéliard
- Canton: Maîche
- Intercommunality: Pays de Maîche

Government
  - Mayor (2020–2026): Françoise Barthoulot
- Area^{1}: 14.49 km^{2} (5.59 sq mi)
- Highest elevation: 860 m (2,820 ft)
- Lowest elevation: 420 m (1,380 ft)
- Population (2023): 135
  - Density: 9.32/km^{2} (24.1/sq mi)
- Time zone: UTC+01:00 (CET)
  - Summer (DST): UTC+02:00 (CEST)
- INSEE/Postal code: 25138 /25190
- ^{1} French Land Register data, which excludes lakes, ponds, glaciers > 1 km^{2} (0.386 sq mi or 247 acres) and river estuaries.

Les Terres-de-Chaux (French pronunciation: [le tɛʁ də ʃo]) is a commune in the Doubs department in the Bourgogne-Franche-Comté region in eastern France.

== Geography ==
The commune lies 12 km (7.5 mi) northeast of Saint-Hippolyte.

== Population ==
Historical population
Year	Pop.	±% p.a.
1968	185	—
1975	148	−3.14%
1982	132	−1.62%
1990	128	−0.38%
1999	116	−1.09%
2007	127	+1.14%
2012	141	+2.11%
2017	135	−0.87%
2023	135	+0.00%
Source: INSEE

== Sights and monuments ==
- The church of Saint-Léger was probably built in the 12th century. The nave and choir were altered in the 14th century. Side chapels were added in the 16th and 17th centuries and a sacristy to the south of the choir between 1760 et 1765. The choir contains murals from the 15th or 16th centuries. The church has been listed since 1936 as a monument historique by the French Ministry of Culture.

== See also ==
- Communes of the Doubs department
