= Canton of Maîche =

Coordinates: 47.25°N 6.80°E

The canton of Maîche is an administrative division of the Doubs department, eastern France. Its borders were modified at the French canton reorganisation which came into effect in March 2015. Its seat is in Maîche.

It consists of the following communes:

1. Abbévillers
2. Autechaux-Roide
3. Belfays
4. Bief
5. Blamont
6. Bondeval
7. Les Bréseux
8. Burnevillers
9. Cernay-l'Église
10. Chamesol
11. Charmauvillers
12. Charquemont
13. Courtefontaine
14. Dampjoux
15. Damprichard
16. Dannemarie
17. Les Écorces
18. Écurcey
19. Ferrières-le-Lac
20. Fessevillers
21. Fleurey
22. Fournet-Blancheroche
23. Frambouhans
24. Froidevaux
25. Glay
26. Glère
27. Goumois
28. Indevillers
29. Liebvillers
30. Maîche
31. Mancenans-Lizerne
32. Meslières
33. Montancy
34. Montandon
35. Mont-de-Vougney
36. Montécheroux
37. Montjoie-le-Château
38. Orgeans-Blanchefontaine
39. Pierrefontaine-lès-Blamont
40. Les Plains-et-Grands-Essarts
41. Roches-lès-Blamont
42. Saint-Hippolyte
43. Soulce-Cernay
44. Les Terres-de-Chaux
45. Thiébouhans
46. Thulay
47. Trévillers
48. Urtière
49. Valoreille
50. Vaufrey
51. Villars-lès-Blamont
