= Fournet-Blancheroche =

- Commune
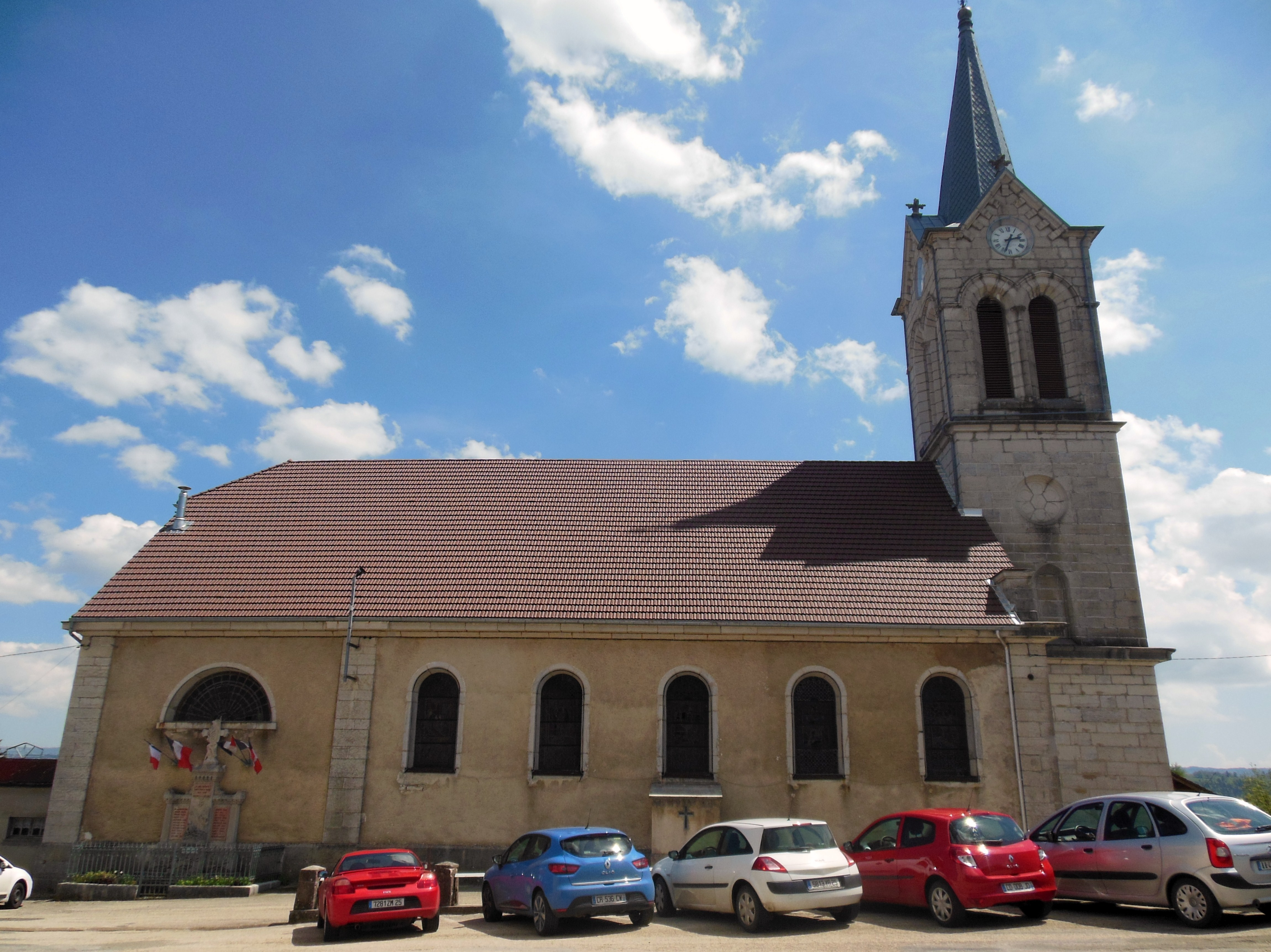
- The church in Fournet-Blancheroche
- Location of Fournet-Blancheroche
- Location within France Location within Bourgogne-Franche-Comté
- Coordinates: 47°10′07″N 6°49′36″E
- Country: France
- Region: Bourgogne-Franche-Comté
- Department: Doubs
- Arrondissement: Montbéliard
- Canton: Maîche

Government
  - Mayor (2020–2026): Pierre-Jean Wycart
- Area^{1}: 13.08 km^{2} (5.05 sq mi)
- Highest elevation: 1,031 m (3,383 ft)
- Lowest elevation: 574 m (1,883 ft)
- Population (2023): 353
  - Density: 27.0/km^{2} (69.9/sq mi)
- Time zone: UTC+01:00 (CET)
  - Summer (DST): UTC+02:00 (CEST)
- INSEE/Postal code: 25255 /25140
- ^{1} French Land Register data, which excludes lakes, ponds, glaciers > 1 km^{2} (0.386 sq mi or 247 acres) and river estuaries.

Fournet-Blancheroche (French pronunciation: [fuʁnɛ blɑ̃ʃʁɔʃ]) is a commune in the Doubs department in the Bourgogne-Franche-Comté region in eastern France.

== Population ==
Historical population
Year	Pop.	±% p.a.
1968	232	—
1975	223	−0.56%
1982	215	−0.52%
1990	224	+0.51%
1999	256	+1.49%
2007	329	+3.19%
2012	347	+1.07%
2017	357	+0.57%
2023	353	−0.19%
Source: INSEE

== See also ==
- Communes of the Doubs department
