= Orgeans-Blanchefontaine =

- Commune
- Location of Orgeans-Blanchefontaine
- Location within France Location within Bourgogne-Franche-Comté
- Coordinates: 47°15′51″N 6°44′39″E
- Country: France
- Region: Bourgogne-Franche-Comté
- Department: Doubs
- Arrondissement: Montbéliard
- Canton: Maîche

Government
  - Mayor (2020–2026): Dominique Bernard
- Area^{1}: 4.83 km^{2} (1.86 sq mi)
- Highest elevation: 713 m (2,339 ft)
- Lowest elevation: 390 m (1,280 ft)
- Population (2023): 41
  - Density: 8.5/km^{2} (22/sq mi)
- Time zone: UTC+01:00 (CET)
  - Summer (DST): UTC+02:00 (CEST)
- INSEE/Postal code: 25433 /25120
- ^{1} French Land Register data, which excludes lakes, ponds, glaciers > 1 km^{2} (0.386 sq mi or 247 acres) and river estuaries.

Orgeans-Blanchefontaine (French pronunciation: [ɔʁʒɑ̃ blɑ̃ʃfɔ̃tɛn]) is a commune in the Doubs department in the Bourgogne-Franche-Comté in region eastern France.

== Population ==
Historical population
Year	Pop.	±% p.a.
1968	52	—
1975	61	+2.31%
1982	60	−0.24%
1990	44	−3.80%
1999	53	+2.09%
2007	46	−1.76%
2012	51	+2.09%
2017	44	−2.91%
2023	41	−1.17%
Source: INSEE

== See also ==
- Communes of the Doubs department
