= Mont-de-Vougney =

- Commune
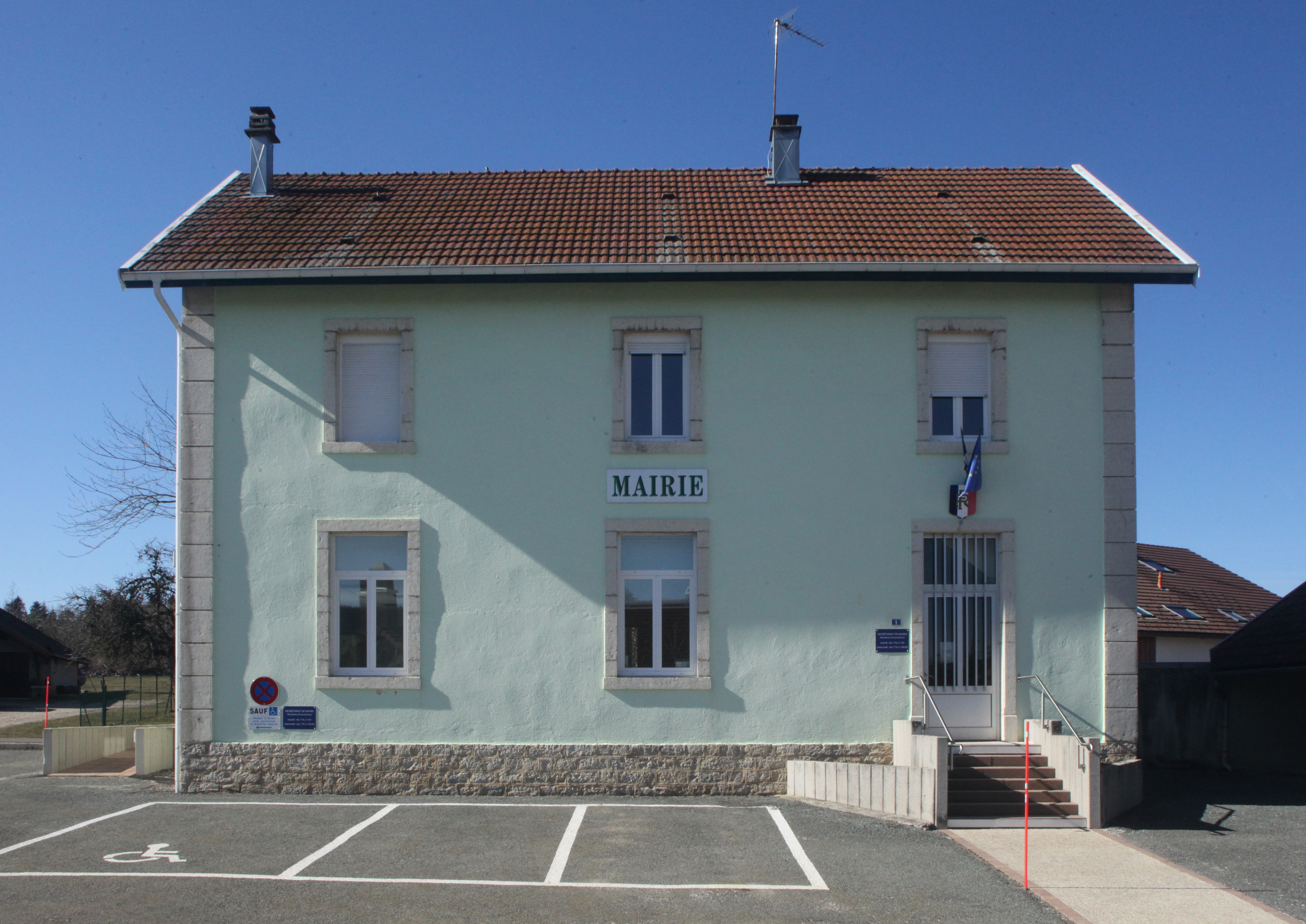
- The town hall in Mont-de-Vougney
- Location of Mont-de-Vougney
- Location within France Location within Bourgogne-Franche-Comté
- Coordinates: 47°14′47″N 6°43′55″E
- Country: France
- Region: Bourgogne-Franche-Comté
- Department: Doubs
- Arrondissement: Montbéliard
- Canton: Maîche

Government
  - Mayor (2020–2026): Jean-Pierre Etevenard
- Area^{1}: 7.03 km^{2} (2.71 sq mi)
- Highest elevation: 942 m (3,091 ft)
- Lowest elevation: 600 m (2,000 ft)
- Population (2023): 193
  - Density: 27.5/km^{2} (71.1/sq mi)
- Time zone: UTC+01:00 (CET)
  - Summer (DST): UTC+02:00 (CEST)
- INSEE/Postal code: 25392 /25120
- ^{1} French Land Register data, which excludes lakes, ponds, glaciers > 1 km^{2} (0.386 sq mi or 247 acres) and river estuaries.

Mont-de-Vougney (French pronunciation: [mɔ̃ də vuɲɛ]) is a commune in the Doubs department in the Bourgogne-Franche-Comté region in eastern France.

== Geography ==
The commune lies 7 km (4.3 mi) southeast of Maîche. There are numerous caves on the territory of the commune.

== Population ==
Historical population
Year	Pop.	±% p.a.
1968	117	—
1975	119	+0.24%
1982	109	−1.25%
1990	122	+1.42%
1999	136	+1.21%
2007	159	+1.97%
2012	173	+1.70%
2017	186	+1.46%
2023	193	+0.62%
Source: INSEE

== See also ==
- Communes of the Doubs department
