= Les Plains-et-Grands-Essarts =

- Commune
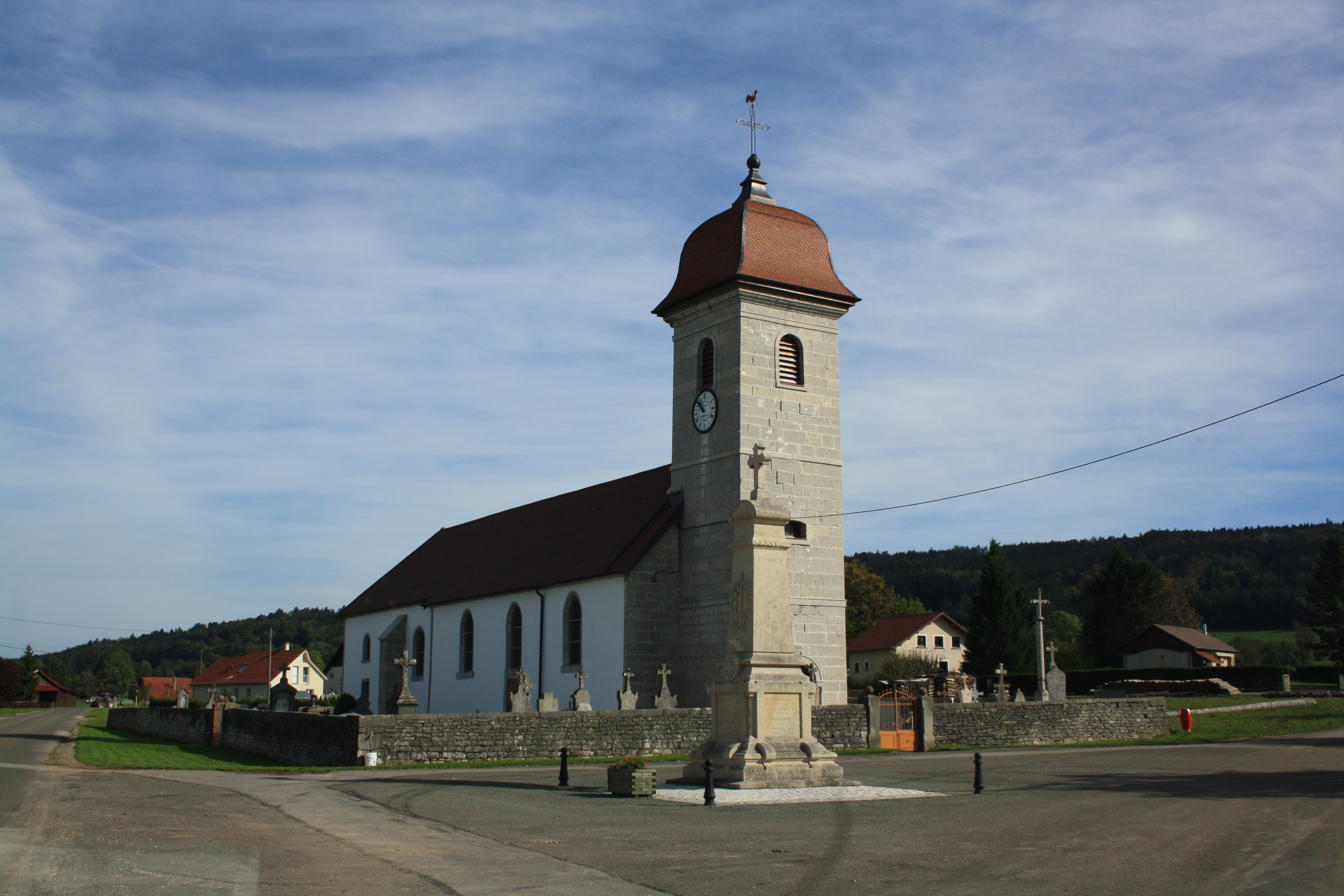
- The church in Les Plains
- Location of Les Plains-et-Grands-Essarts
- Location within France Location within Bourgogne-Franche-Comté
- Coordinates: 47°18′16″N 6°53′44″E
- Country: France
- Region: Bourgogne-Franche-Comté
- Department: Doubs
- Arrondissement: Montbéliard
- Canton: Maîche
- Intercommunality: Pays de Maîche

Government
  - Mayor (2020–2026): Denis Narbey
- Area^{1}: 10.35 km^{2} (4.00 sq mi)
- Highest elevation: 933 m (3,061 ft)
- Lowest elevation: 626 m (2,054 ft)
- Population (2023): 207
  - Density: 20.0/km^{2} (51.8/sq mi)
- Time zone: UTC+01:00 (CET)
  - Summer (DST): UTC+02:00 (CEST)
- INSEE/Postal code: 25458 /25470
- ^{1} French Land Register data, which excludes lakes, ponds, glaciers > 1 km^{2} (0.386 sq mi or 247 acres) and river estuaries.

Les Plains-et-Grands-Essarts (French pronunciation: [le plɛ̃ e ɡʁɑ̃.z‿esaʁ]) is a commune in the Doubs department in the Bourgogne-Franche-Comté region in eastern France.

== Population ==
Historical population
Year	Pop.	±% p.a.
1968	200	—
1975	178	−1.65%
1982	156	−1.87%
1990	171	+1.15%
1999	179	+0.51%
2007	185	+0.41%
2012	215	+3.05%
2017	219	+0.37%
2023	207	−0.93%
Source: INSEE

== See also ==
- Communes of the Doubs department
