= Les Écorces =

- Commune
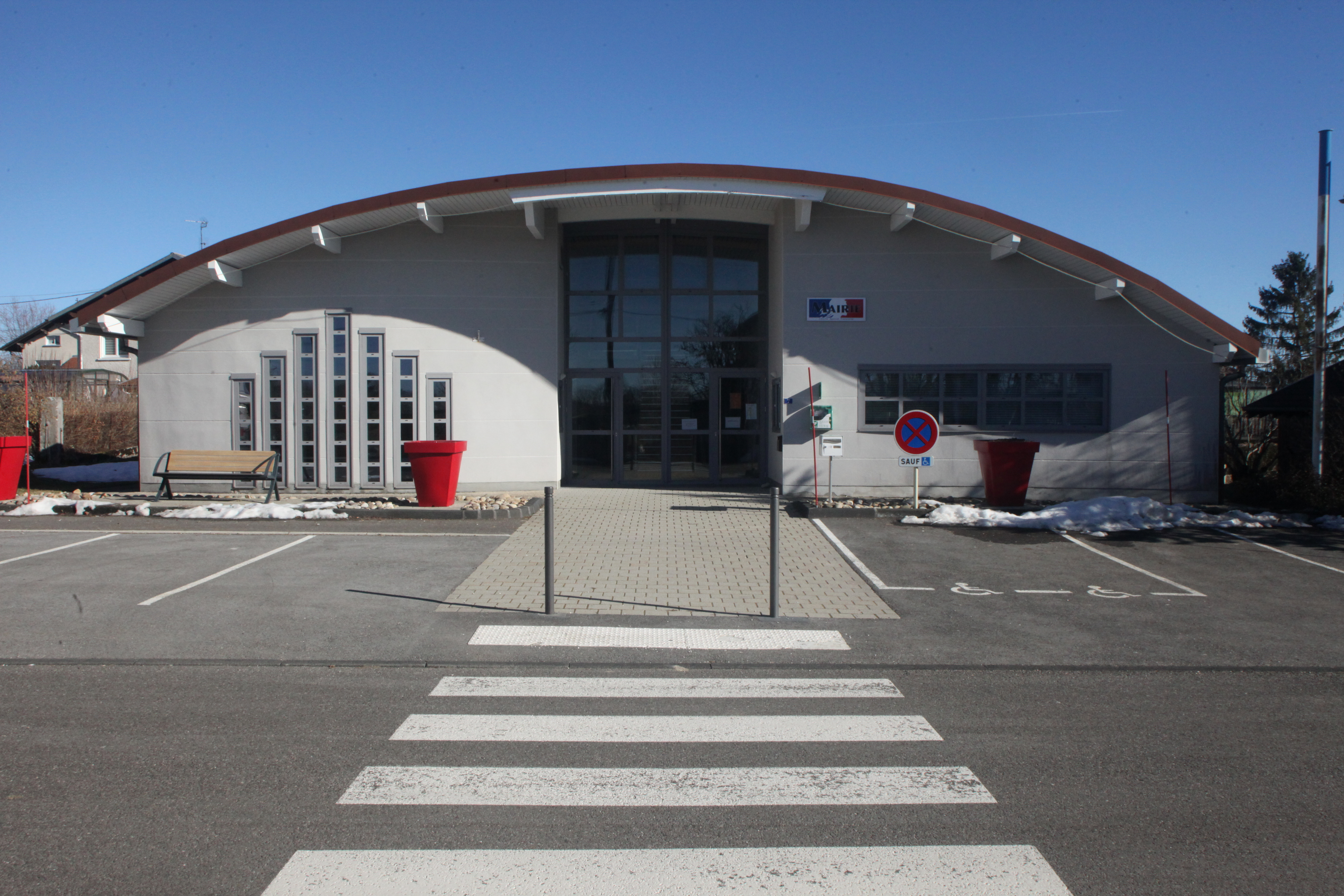
- The town hall in Les Écorces
- Location of Les Écorces
- Location within France Location within Bourgogne-Franche-Comté
- Coordinates: 47°13′06″N 6°47′59″E
- Country: France
- Region: Bourgogne-Franche-Comté
- Department: Doubs
- Arrondissement: Montbéliard
- Canton: Maîche
- Intercommunality: Pays de Maîche

Government
  - Mayor (2020–2026): Maxime Martin
- Area^{1}: 9.51 km^{2} (3.67 sq mi)
- Elevation: 904 m (2,966 ft)
- Highest elevation: 920 m (3,020 ft)
- Lowest elevation: 809 m (2,654 ft)
- Population (2023): 777
  - Density: 81.7/km^{2} (212/sq mi)
- Time zone: UTC+01:00 (CET)
  - Summer (DST): UTC+02:00 (CEST)
- INSEE/Postal code: 25213 /25140
- ^{1} French Land Register data, which excludes lakes, ponds, glaciers > 1 km^{2} (0.386 sq mi or 247 acres) and river estuaries.

Les Écorces (French pronunciation: [le.z‿ekɔʁs]) is a commune in the Doubs department in the Bourgogne-Franche-Comté region in eastern France.

== Population ==
Historical population
Year	Pop.	±% p.a.
1968	346	—
1975	302	−1.92%
1982	378	+3.26%
1990	452	+2.26%
1999	502	+1.17%
2007	580	+1.82%
2012	682	+3.29%
2017	718	+1.03%
2023	777	+1.32%
Source: INSEE

== See also ==
- Communes of the Doubs department
