= Froidevaux =

- Commune
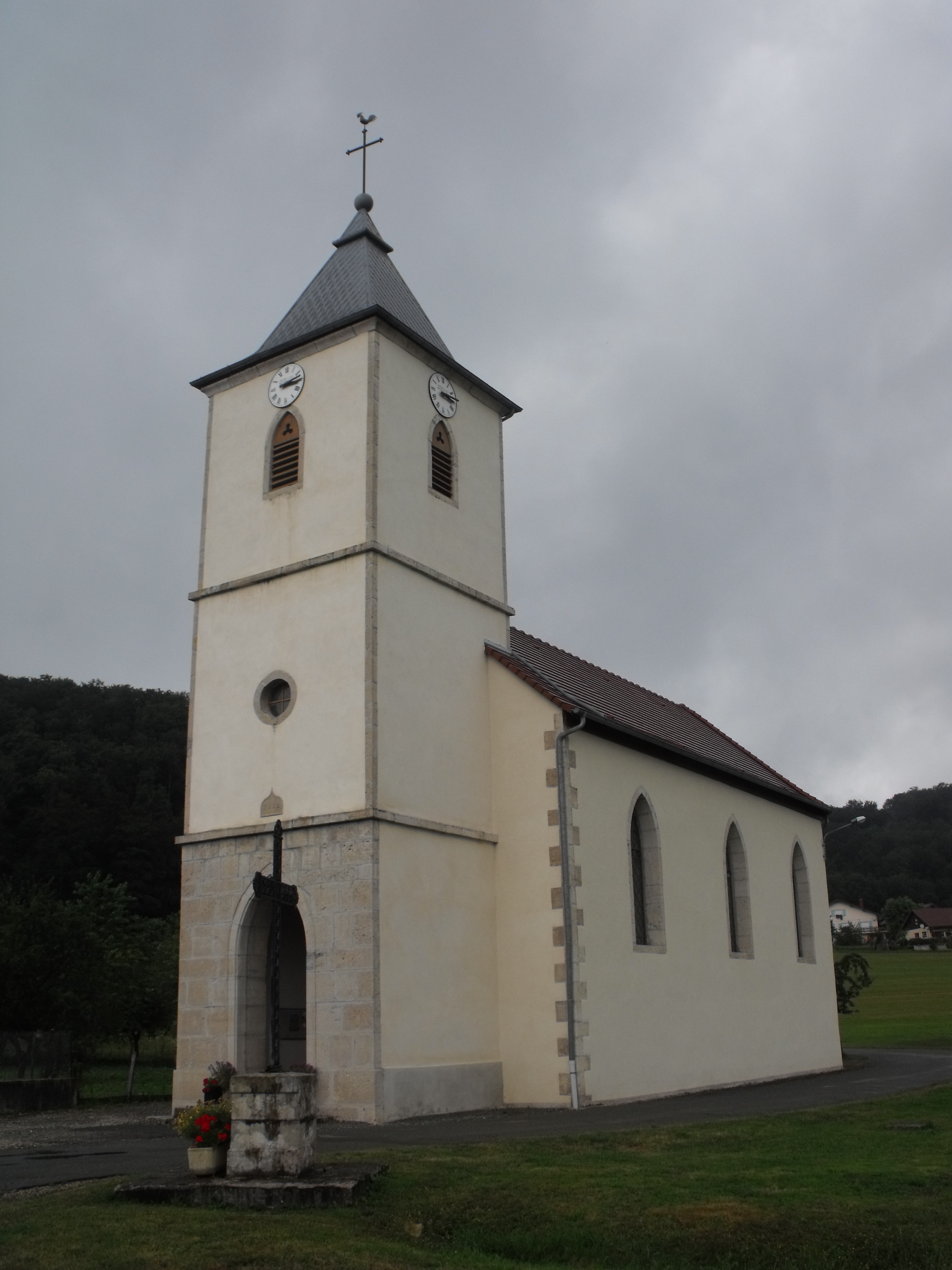
- The church in Froidevaux
- Location of Froidevaux
- Location within France Location within Bourgogne-Franche-Comté
- Coordinates: 47°18′04″N 6°41′32″E
- Country: France
- Region: Bourgogne-Franche-Comté
- Department: Doubs
- Arrondissement: Montbéliard
- Canton: Maîche

Government
  - Mayor (2020–2026): Bruno Feuvrier
- Area^{1}: 3.98 km^{2} (1.54 sq mi)
- Highest elevation: 820 m (2,690 ft)
- Lowest elevation: 666 m (2,185 ft)
- Population (2023): 83
  - Density: 21/km^{2} (54/sq mi)
- Time zone: UTC+01:00 (CET)
  - Summer (DST): UTC+02:00 (CEST)
- INSEE/Postal code: 25261 /25190
- ^{1} French Land Register data, which excludes lakes, ponds, glaciers > 1 km^{2} (0.386 sq mi or 247 acres) and river estuaries.

Froidevaux (French pronunciation: [fʁwadvo]) is a commune in the Doubs department in the Bourgogne-Franche-Comté region in eastern France.

== Population ==
Historical population
Year	Pop.	±% p.a.
1968	90	—
1975	93	+0.47%
1982	95	+0.30%
1990	80	−2.13%
1999	69	−1.63%
2007	57	−2.36%
2012	65	+2.66%
2017	75	+2.90%
2023	83	+1.70%
Source: INSEE

== See also ==
- Communes of the Doubs department
