= Écurcey =

- Commune
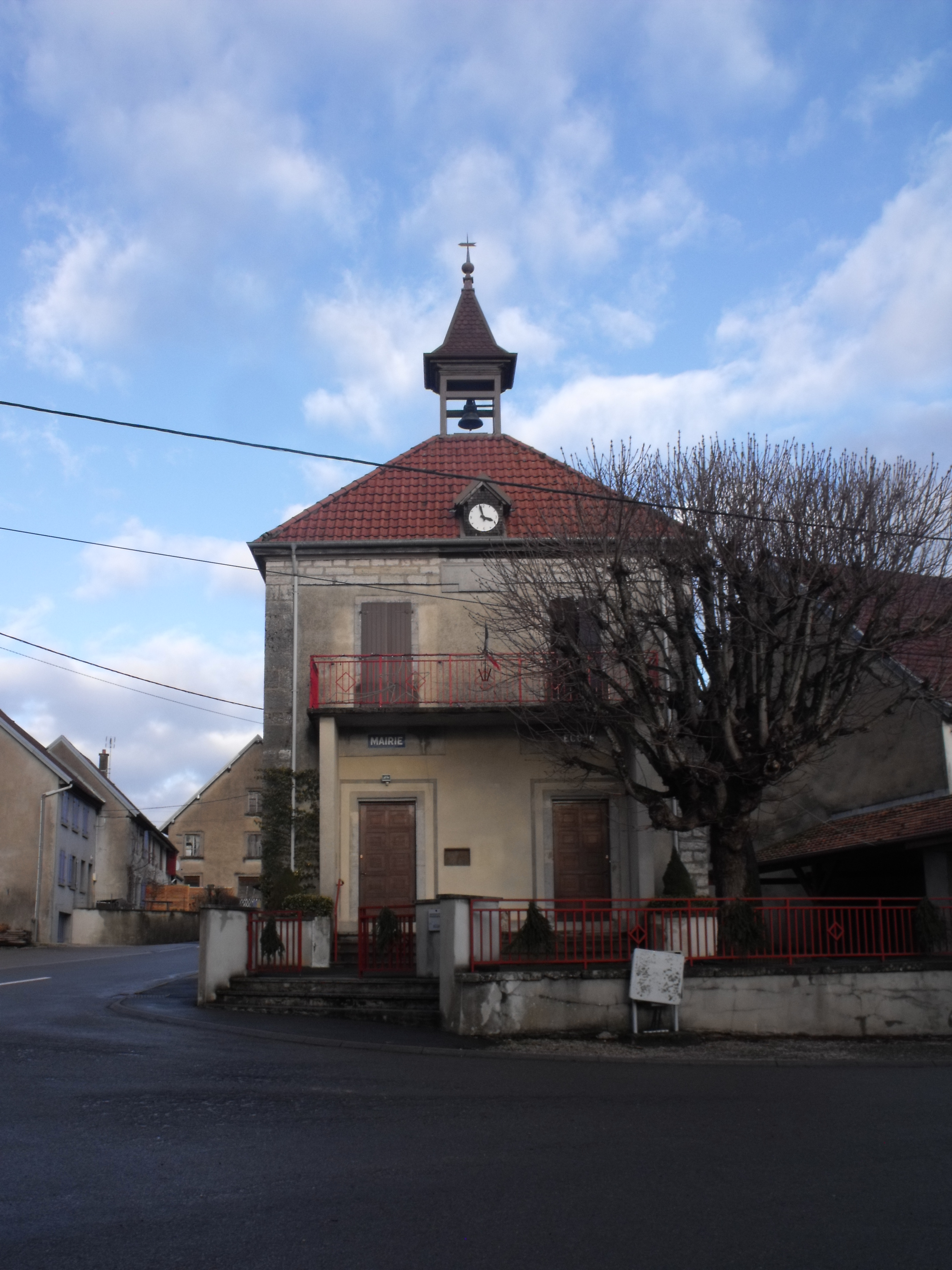
- The town hall in Écurcey
- Location of Écurcey
- Location within France Location within Bourgogne-Franche-Comté
- Coordinates: 47°24′21″N 6°48′47″E
- Country: France
- Region: Bourgogne-Franche-Comté
- Department: Doubs
- Arrondissement: Montbéliard
- Canton: Maîche
- Intercommunality: Pays de Montbéliard Agglomération

Government
  - Mayor (2020–2026): André Dufresnes
- Area^{1}: 7.43 km^{2} (2.87 sq mi)
- Elevation: 572 m (1,877 ft)
- Highest elevation: 598 m (1,962 ft)
- Lowest elevation: 353 m (1,158 ft)
- Population (2023): 270
  - Density: 36/km^{2} (94/sq mi)
- Time zone: UTC+01:00 (CET)
  - Summer (DST): UTC+02:00 (CEST)
- INSEE/Postal code: 25216 /25150
- ^{1} French Land Register data, which excludes lakes, ponds, glaciers > 1 km^{2} (0.386 sq mi or 247 acres) and river estuaries.

Écurcey (French pronunciation: [ekyʁsɛ]) is a commune in the Doubs department in the Bourgogne-Franche-Comté region in eastern France.

== Population ==
Historical population
Year	Pop.	±% p.a.
1968	205	—
1975	263	+3.62%
1982	277	+0.74%
1990	289	+0.53%
1999	287	−0.08%
2007	282	−0.22%
2012	278	−0.29%
2017	268	−0.73%
2023	270	+0.12%
Source: INSEE

== See also ==
- Communes of the Doubs department
