= Thulay =

- Commune
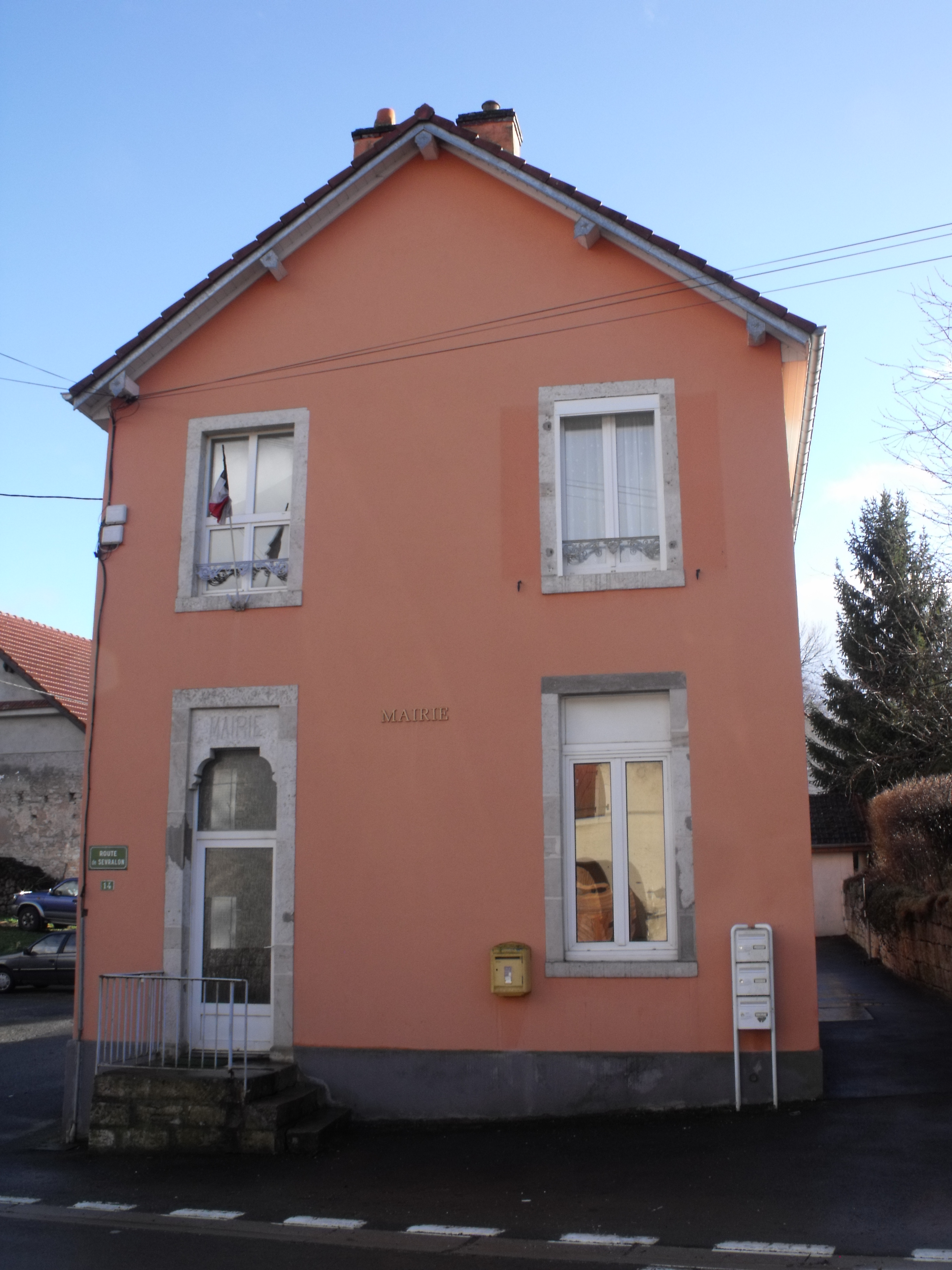
- The town hall in Thulay

- Coat of arms
- Location of Thulay
- Location within France Location within Bourgogne-Franche-Comté
- Coordinates: 47°25′30″N 6°51′44″E
- Country: France
- Region: Bourgogne-Franche-Comté
- Department: Doubs
- Arrondissement: Montbéliard
- Canton: Maîche
- Intercommunality: Pays de Montbéliard Agglomération

Government
  - Mayor (2022–2026): Eric Salas
- Area^{1}: 2.23 km^{2} (0.86 sq mi)
- Highest elevation: 541 m (1,775 ft)
- Lowest elevation: 394 m (1,293 ft)
- Population (2023): 203
  - Density: 91.0/km^{2} (236/sq mi)
- Time zone: UTC+01:00 (CET)
  - Summer (DST): UTC+02:00 (CEST)
- INSEE/Postal code: 25562 /25310
- ^{1} French Land Register data, which excludes lakes, ponds, glaciers > 1 km^{2} (0.386 sq mi or 247 acres) and river estuaries.

Thulay (French pronunciation: [tylɛ]) is a commune in the Doubs department in the Bourgogne-Franche-Comté region in eastern France.

== Geography ==
Thulay lies 2.5 km (1.6 mi) from Hérimoncourt on the slope of the Blamont plateau.

== Population ==
Historical population
Year	Pop.	±% p.a.
1968	95	—
1975	105	+1.44%
1982	119	+1.80%
1990	140	+2.05%
1999	172	+2.31%
2007	208	+2.40%
2012	226	+1.67%
2017	218	−0.72%
2023	203	−1.18%
Source: INSEE

== See also ==
- Communes of the Doubs department
