= Frambouhans =

- Commune
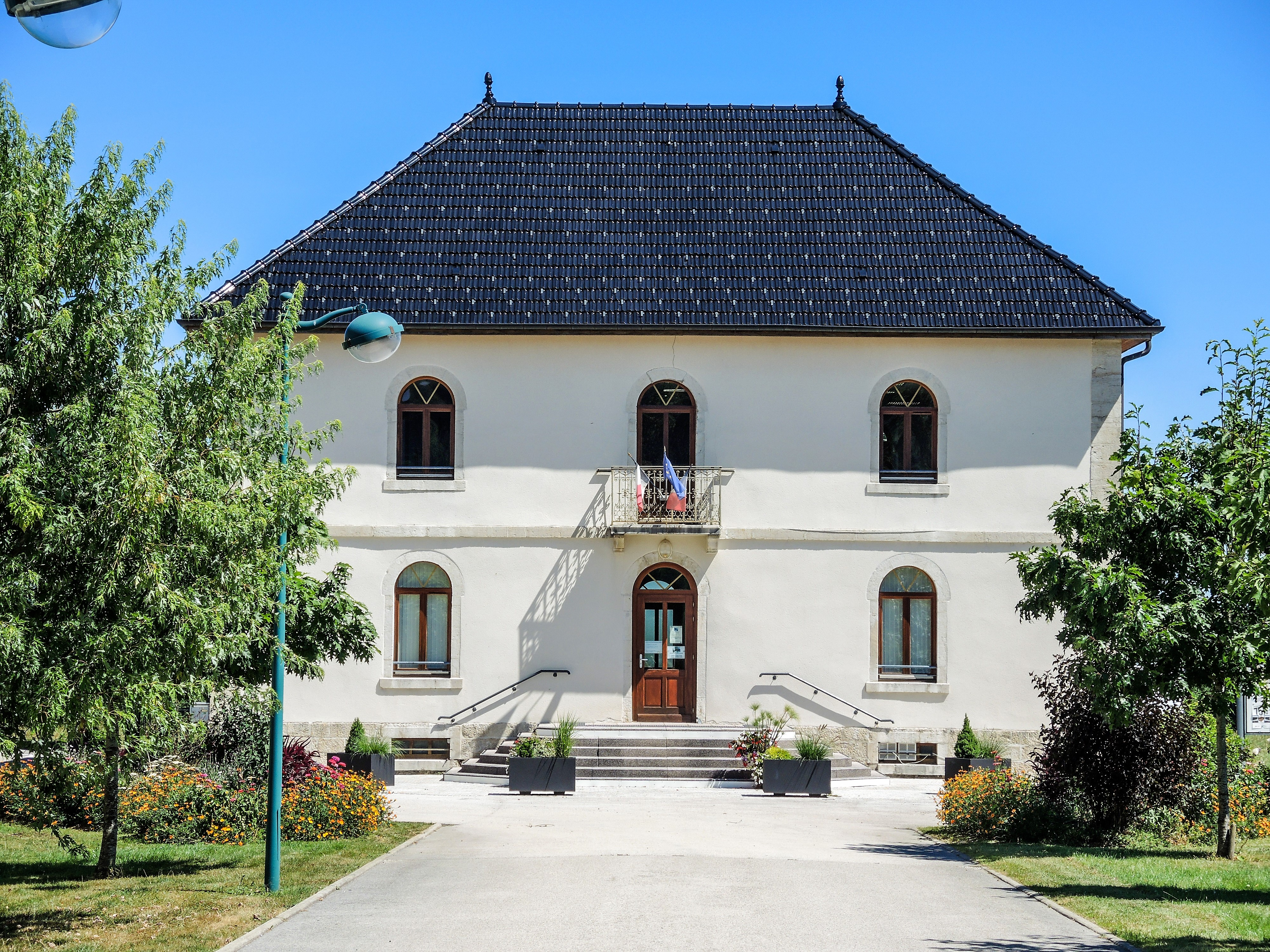
- The town hall in Frambouhans
- Location of Frambouhans
- Location within France Location within Bourgogne-Franche-Comté
- Coordinates: 47°13′13″N 6°46′06″E
- Country: France
- Region: Bourgogne-Franche-Comté
- Department: Doubs
- Arrondissement: Montbéliard
- Canton: Maîche

Government
  - Mayor (2020–2026): Franck Villemain
- Area^{1}: 10.1 km^{2} (3.9 sq mi)
- Highest elevation: 960 m (3,150 ft)
- Lowest elevation: 820 m (2,690 ft)
- Population (2023): 867
  - Density: 85.8/km^{2} (222/sq mi)
- Time zone: UTC+01:00 (CET)
  - Summer (DST): UTC+02:00 (CEST)
- INSEE/Postal code: 25256 /25140
- ^{1} French Land Register data, which excludes lakes, ponds, glaciers > 1 km^{2} (0.386 sq mi or 247 acres) and river estuaries.

Frambouhans (French pronunciation: [fʁɑ̃bu.ɑ̃]) is a commune in the Doubs department in the Bourgogne-Franche-Comté region in eastern France.

== Population ==
Historical population
Year	Pop.	±% p.a.
1968	274	—
1975	416	+6.15%
1982	545	+3.93%
1990	553	+0.18%
1999	613	+1.15%
2007	702	+1.71%
2012	842	+3.70%
2017	904	+1.43%
2023	867	−0.69%
Source: INSEE

== See also ==
- Communes of the Doubs department
