= Chamesol =

- Commune
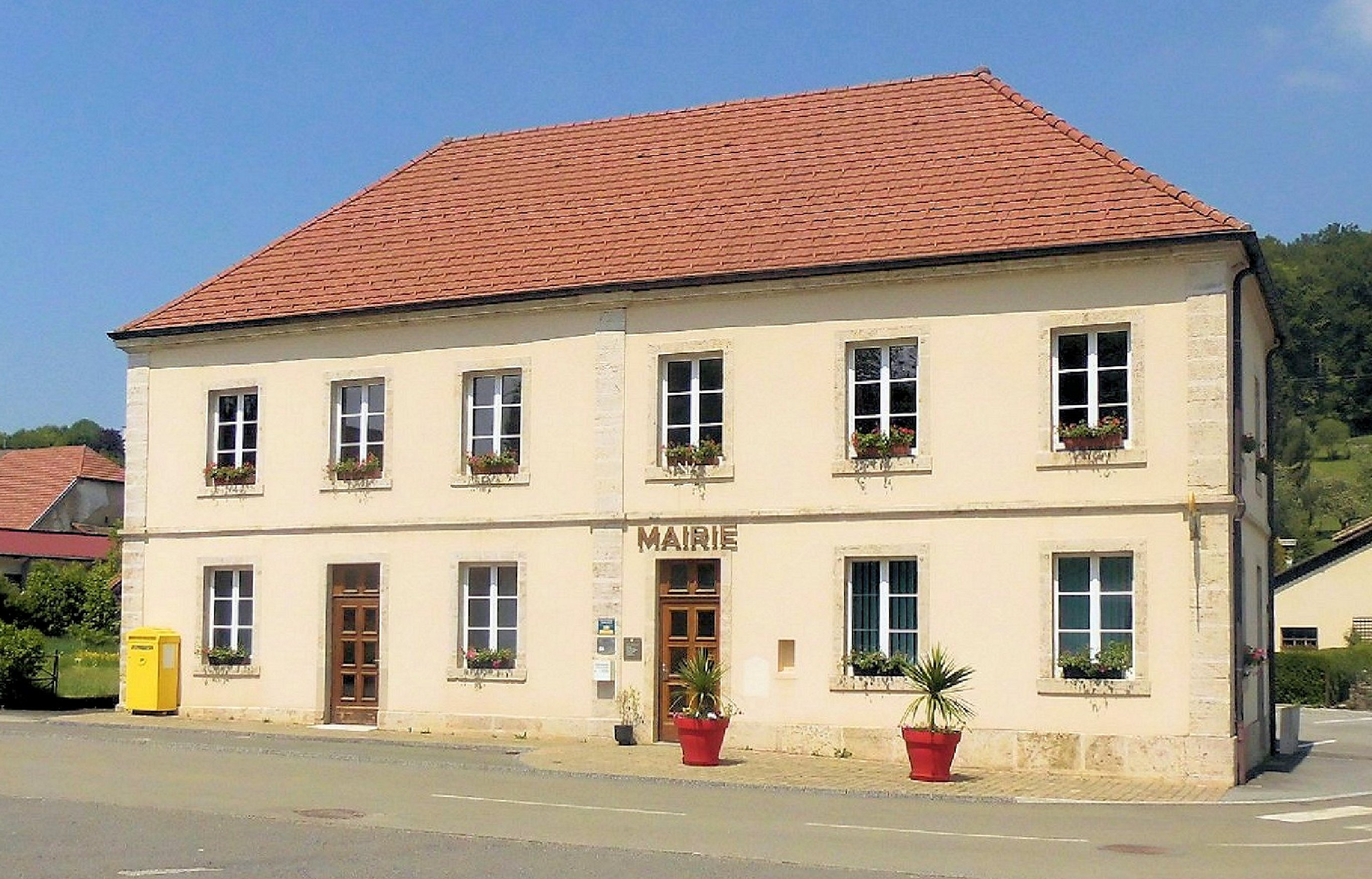
- The town hall in Chamesol
- Location of Chamesol
- Location within France Location within Bourgogne-Franche-Comté
- Coordinates: 47°20′54″N 6°49′57″E
- Country: France
- Region: Bourgogne-Franche-Comté
- Department: Doubs
- Arrondissement: Montbéliard
- Canton: Maîche

Government
  - Mayor (2020–2026): Emmanuel Saulnier
- Area^{1}: 10.21 km^{2} (3.94 sq mi)
- Highest elevation: 835 m (2,740 ft)
- Lowest elevation: 400 m (1,300 ft)
- Population (2023): 383
  - Density: 37.5/km^{2} (97.2/sq mi)
- Time zone: UTC+01:00 (CET)
  - Summer (DST): UTC+02:00 (CEST)
- INSEE/Postal code: 25114 /25190
- ^{1} French Land Register data, which excludes lakes, ponds, glaciers > 1 km^{2} (0.386 sq mi or 247 acres) and river estuaries.

Chamesol (French pronunciation: [ʃamzɔl]) is a commune in the Doubs department in the Bourgogne-Franche-Comté region in eastern France.

== Population ==
Historical population
Year	Pop.	±% p.a.
1968	300	—
1975	282	−0.88%
1982	306	+1.17%
1990	310	+0.16%
1999	328	+0.63%
2007	367	+1.41%
2012	406	+2.04%
2017	378	−1.42%
2023	383	+0.22%
Source: INSEE

== See also ==
- Communes of the Doubs department
