= Bondeval =

- Commune
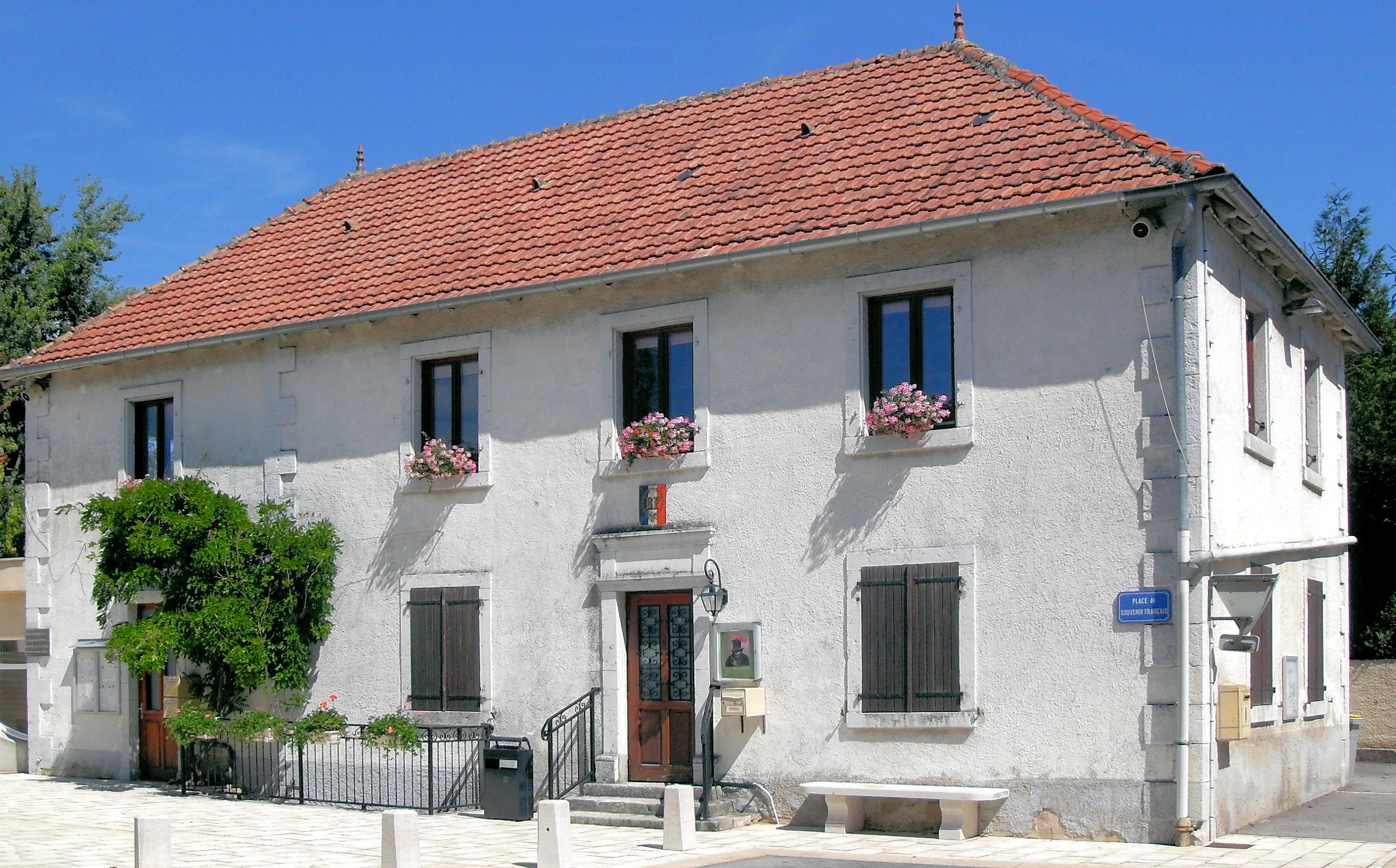
- The town hall in Bondeval
- Location of Bondeval
- Location within France Location within Bourgogne-Franche-Comté
- Coordinates: 47°26′42″N 6°50′57″E
- Country: France
- Region: Bourgogne-Franche-Comté
- Department: Doubs
- Arrondissement: Montbéliard
- Canton: Maîche
- Intercommunality: Pays de Montbéliard Agglomération

Government
  - Mayor (2020–2026): Guy Barbier
- Area^{1}: 4.68 km^{2} (1.81 sq mi)
- Highest elevation: 560 m (1,840 ft)
- Lowest elevation: 378 m (1,240 ft)
- Population (2023): 481
  - Density: 103/km^{2} (266/sq mi)
- Time zone: UTC+01:00 (CET)
  - Summer (DST): UTC+02:00 (CEST)
- INSEE/Postal code: 25071 /25230
- ^{1} French Land Register data, which excludes lakes, ponds, glaciers > 1 km^{2} (0.386 sq mi or 247 acres) and river estuaries.

Bondeval (French pronunciation: [bɔ̃dval]) is a commune in the Doubs department in the Bourgogne-Franche-Comté region in eastern France.

== Population ==
Historical population
Year	Pop.	±% p.a.
1968	332	—
1975	351	+0.80%
1982	400	+1.88%
1990	411	+0.34%
1999	440	+0.76%
2007	463	+0.64%
2012	478	+0.64%
2017	472	−0.25%
2023	481	+0.32%
Source: INSEE

== See also ==
- Communes of the Doubs department
