= Liebvillers =

- Commune
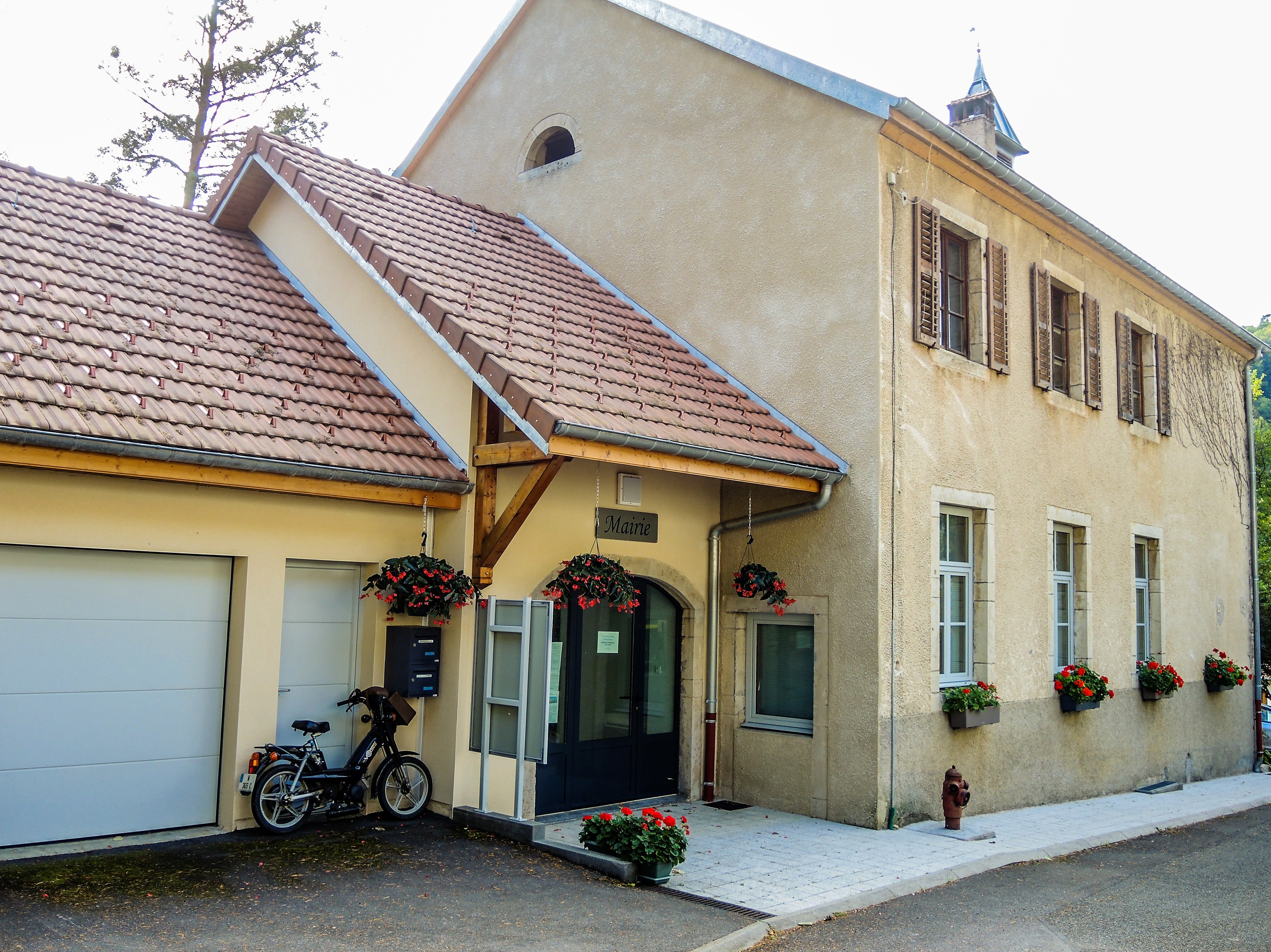
- The town hall in Liebvillers

- Coat of arms
- Location of Liebvillers
- Location within France Location within Bourgogne-Franche-Comté
- Coordinates: 47°20′10″N 6°47′05″E
- Country: France
- Region: Bourgogne-Franche-Comté
- Department: Doubs
- Arrondissement: Montbéliard
- Canton: Maîche
- Intercommunality: Pays de Maîche

Government
  - Mayor (2020–2026): Catherine Racine
- Area^{1}: 3.03 km^{2} (1.17 sq mi)
- Highest elevation: 650 m (2,130 ft)
- Lowest elevation: 356 m (1,168 ft)
- Population (2023): 148
  - Density: 48.8/km^{2} (127/sq mi)
- Time zone: UTC+01:00 (CET)
  - Summer (DST): UTC+02:00 (CEST)
- INSEE/Postal code: 25335 /25190
- ^{1} French Land Register data, which excludes lakes, ponds, glaciers > 1 km^{2} (0.386 sq mi or 247 acres) and river estuaries.

Liebvillers is a commune in the Doubs department in the Bourgogne-Franche-Comté region in eastern France.

== Population ==
Historical population
Year	Pop.	±% p.a.
1968	291	—
1975	194	−5.63%
1982	162	−2.54%
1990	192	+2.15%
1999	187	−0.29%
2007	204	+1.09%
2012	156	−5.22%
2017	164	+1.01%
2023	148	−1.70%
Source: INSEE

== See also ==
- Communes of the Doubs department
