= Bief =

- Commune
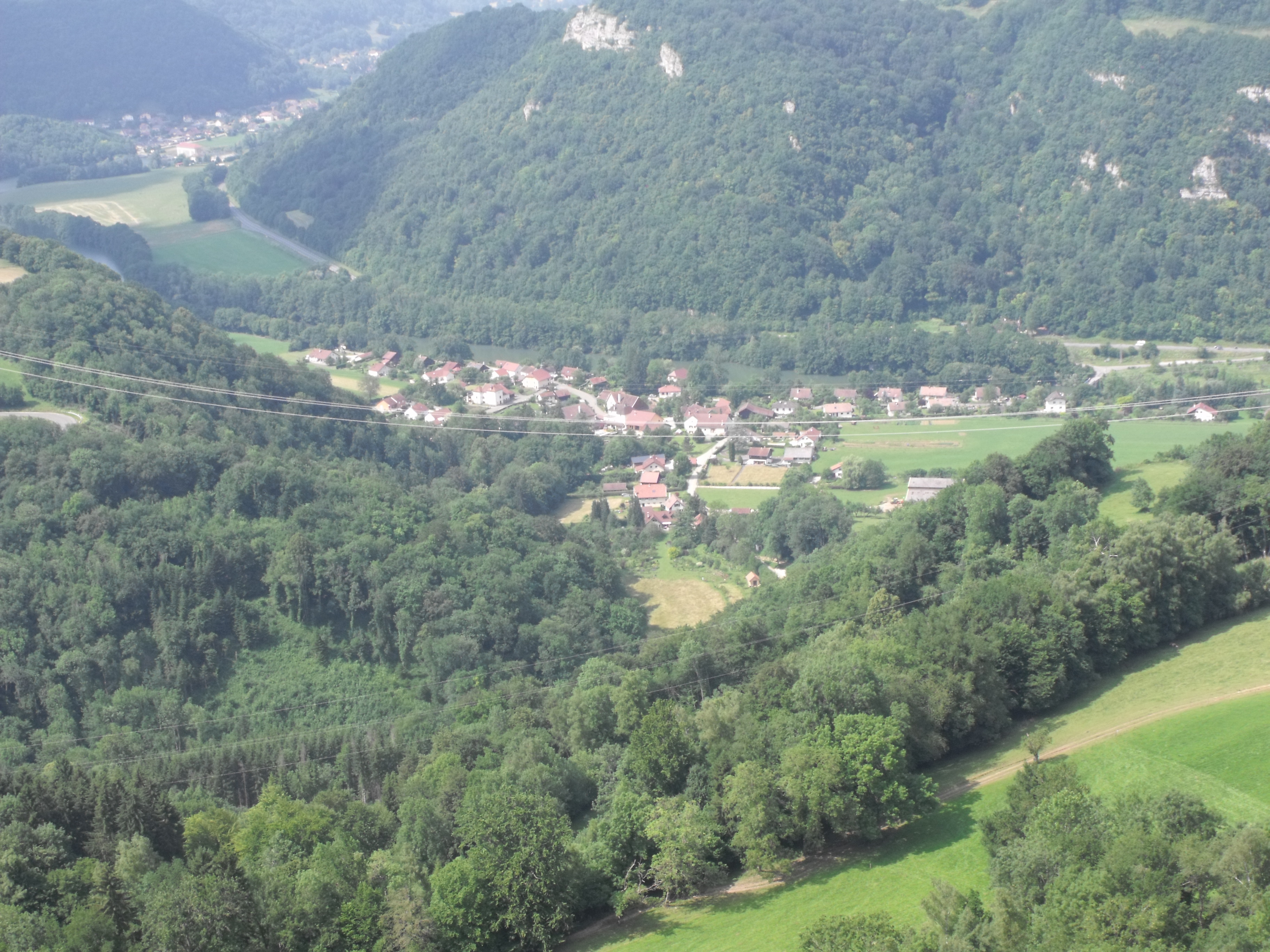
- A general view of Bief
- Location of Bief
- Location within France Location within Bourgogne-Franche-Comté
- Coordinates: 47°19′37″N 6°46′10″E
- Country: France
- Region: Bourgogne-Franche-Comté
- Department: Doubs
- Arrondissement: Montbéliard
- Canton: Maîche
- Intercommunality: Pays de Maîche

Government
  - Mayor (2020–2026): Alexandre Pantel
- Area^{1}: 3.81 km^{2} (1.47 sq mi)
- Highest elevation: 660 m (2,170 ft)
- Lowest elevation: 357 m (1,171 ft)
- Population (2023): 108
  - Density: 28.3/km^{2} (73.4/sq mi)
- Time zone: UTC+01:00 (CET)
  - Summer (DST): UTC+02:00 (CEST)
- INSEE/Postal code: 25061 /25190
- ^{1} French Land Register data, which excludes lakes, ponds, glaciers > 1 km^{2} (0.386 sq mi or 247 acres) and river estuaries.

Bief is a commune in the Doubs department in the Bourgogne-Franche-Comté region in eastern France.

== Population ==
Historical population
Year	Pop.	±% p.a.
1968	117	—
1975	98	−2.50%
1982	124	+3.42%
1990	132	+0.78%
1999	123	−0.78%
2007	115	−0.84%
2012	108	−1.25%
2017	114	+1.09%
2023	108	−0.90%
Source: INSEE

== See also ==
- Communes of the Doubs department
