= Damprichard =

- Commune
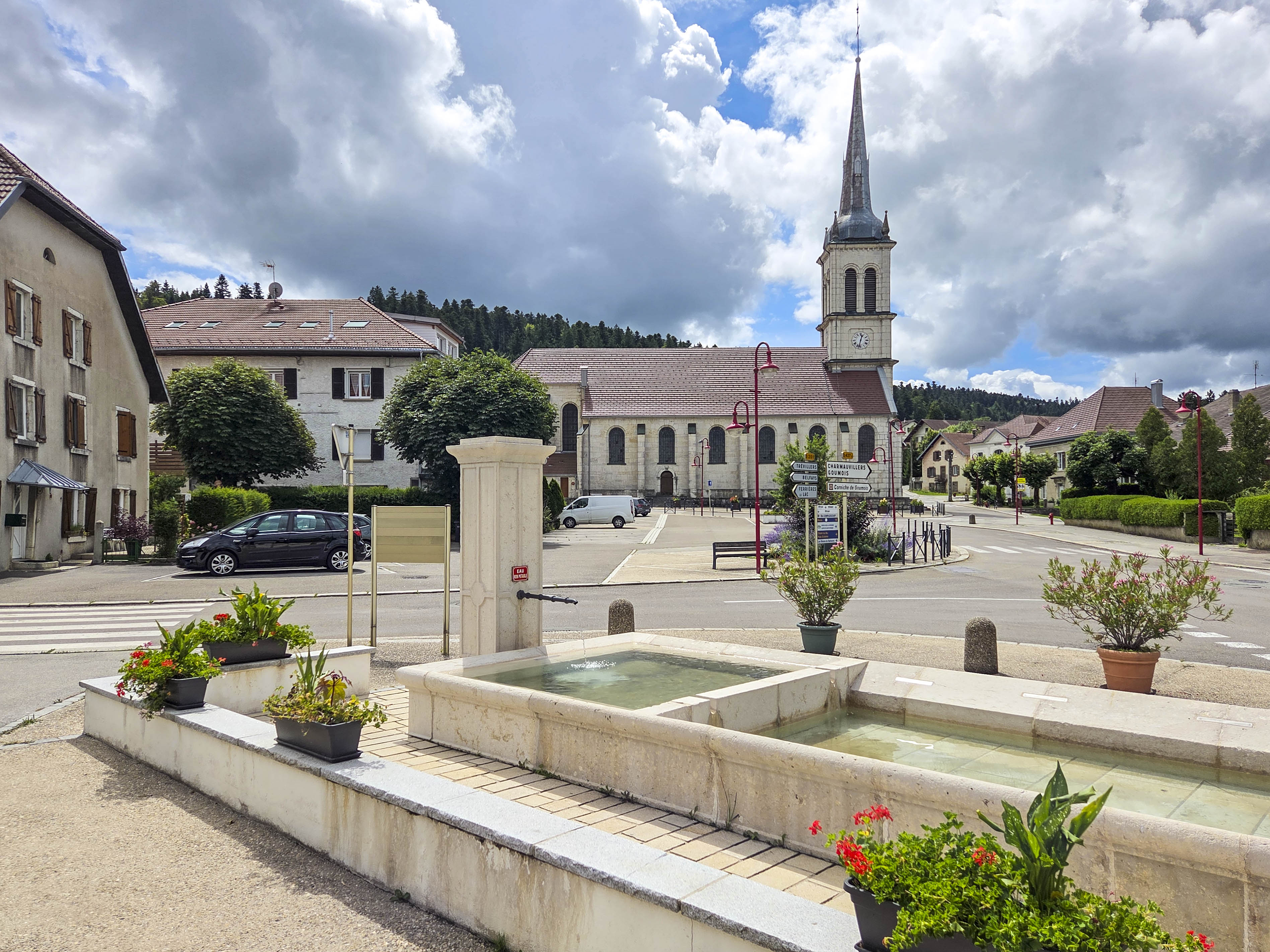
- The center of the village

- Coat of arms
- Location of Damprichard
- Location within France Location within Bourgogne-Franche-Comté
- Coordinates: 47°14′43″N 6°52′56″E
- Country: France
- Region: Bourgogne-Franche-Comté
- Department: Doubs
- Arrondissement: Montbéliard
- Canton: Maîche
- Intercommunality: Pays de Maîche

Government
  - Mayor (2020–2026): Anthony Merique
- Area^{1}: 21.9 km^{2} (8.5 sq mi)
- Highest elevation: 1,023 m (3,356 ft)
- Lowest elevation: 780 m (2,560 ft)
- Population (2023): 1,776
  - Density: 81.1/km^{2} (210/sq mi)
- Time zone: UTC+01:00 (CET)
  - Summer (DST): UTC+02:00 (CEST)
- INSEE/Postal code: 25193 /25450
- ^{1} French Land Register data, which excludes lakes, ponds, glaciers > 1 km^{2} (0.386 sq mi or 247 acres) and river estuaries.

Damprichard (French pronunciation: [dɑ̃(p)ʁiʃaʁ]) is a commune in the Doubs department in the Bourgogne-Franche-Comté region in eastern France.

== Population ==
Historical population
Year	Pop.	±% p.a.
1968	1,763	—
1975	2,016	+1.93%
1982	1,907	−0.79%
1990	1,858	−0.32%
1999	1,768	−0.55%
2007	1,787	+0.13%
2012	1,790	+0.03%
2017	1,903	+1.23%
2023	1,776	−1.14%
Source: INSEE

== See also ==
- Communes of the Doubs department
