= Fleurey =

- Commune
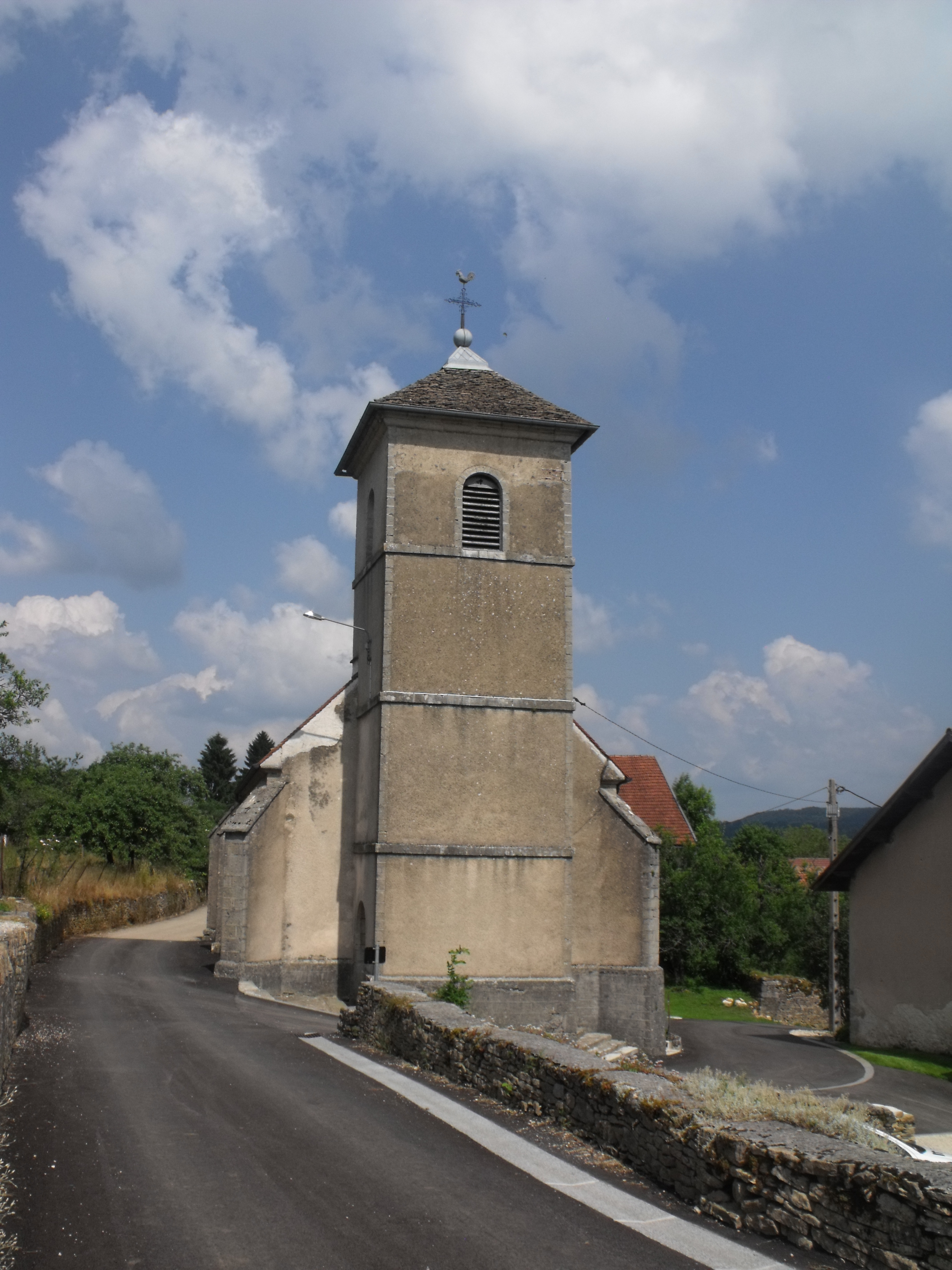
- The church in Fleurey
- Location of Fleurey
- Location within France Location within Bourgogne-Franche-Comté
- Coordinates: 47°18′16″N 6°46′48″E
- Country: France
- Region: Bourgogne-Franche-Comté
- Department: Doubs
- Arrondissement: Montbéliard
- Canton: Maîche

Government
  - Mayor (2020–2026): André Bessot
- Area^{1}: 8.04 km^{2} (3.10 sq mi)
- Highest elevation: 750 m (2,460 ft)
- Lowest elevation: 385 m (1,263 ft)
- Population (2023): 84
  - Density: 10/km^{2} (27/sq mi)
- Time zone: UTC+01:00 (CET)
  - Summer (DST): UTC+02:00 (CEST)
- INSEE/Postal code: 25244 /25190
- ^{1} French Land Register data, which excludes lakes, ponds, glaciers > 1 km^{2} (0.386 sq mi or 247 acres) and river estuaries.

Fleurey (French pronunciation: [flœʁɛ]) is a commune in the Doubs department in the Bourgogne-Franche-Comté region in eastern France.

== Population ==
Historical population
Year	Pop.	±% p.a.
1968	102	—
1975	97	−0.72%
1982	98	+0.15%
1990	79	−2.66%
1999	69	−1.49%
2007	86	+2.79%
2012	101	+3.27%
2017	85	−3.39%
2023	84	−0.20%
Source: INSEE

== See also ==
- Communes of the Doubs department
