= Ferrières-le-Lac =

- Commune
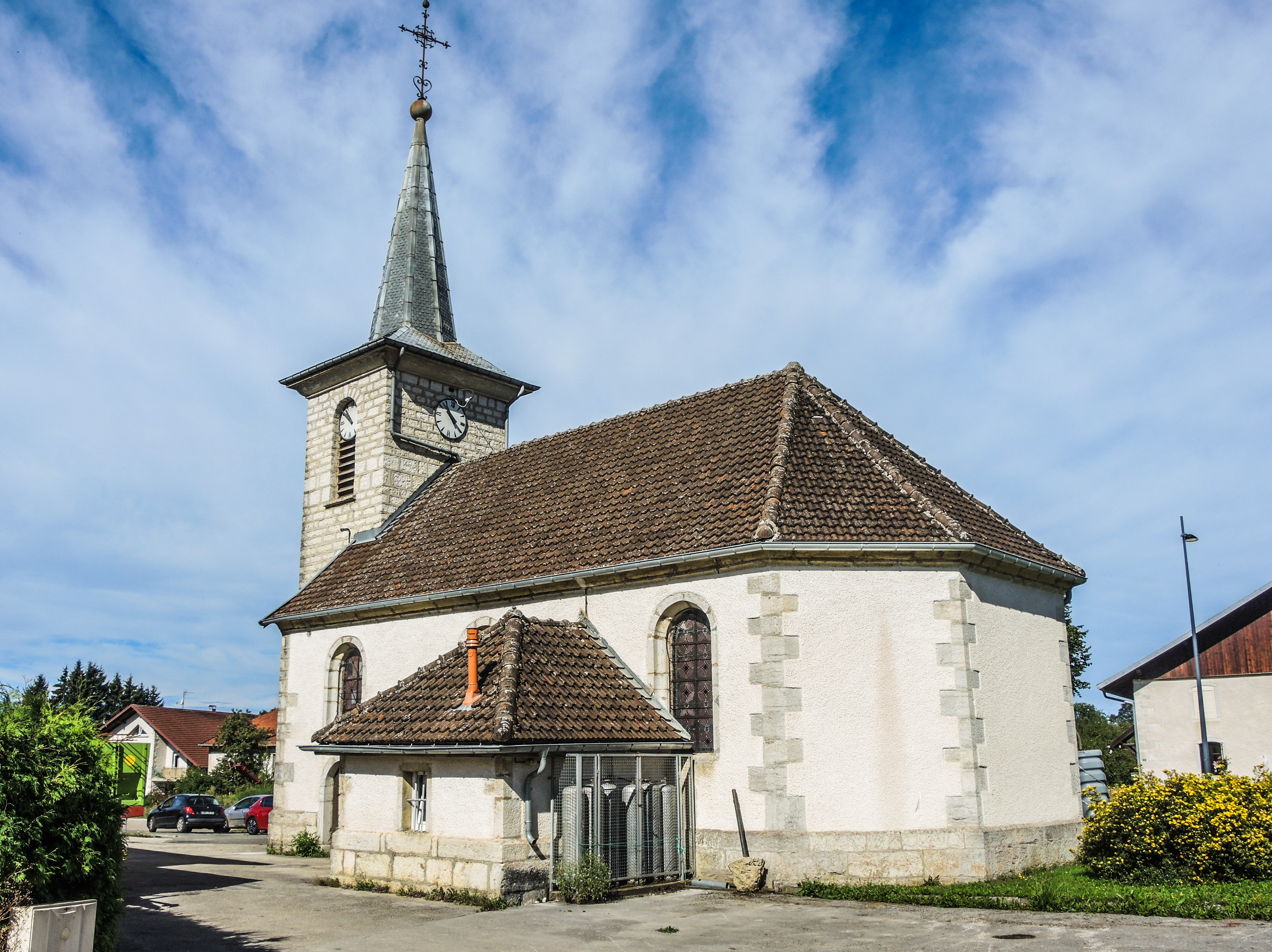
- The church
- Location of Ferrières-le-Lac
- Location within France Location within Bourgogne-Franche-Comté
- Coordinates: 47°16′05″N 6°53′33″E
- Country: France
- Region: Bourgogne-Franche-Comté
- Department: Doubs
- Arrondissement: Montbéliard
- Canton: Maîche

Government
  - Mayor (2020–2026): Sébastien Barras
- Area^{1}: 2.47 km^{2} (0.95 sq mi)
- Highest elevation: 910 m (2,990 ft)
- Lowest elevation: 789 m (2,589 ft)
- Population (2023): 160
  - Density: 65/km^{2} (170/sq mi)
- Time zone: UTC+01:00 (CET)
  - Summer (DST): UTC+02:00 (CEST)
- INSEE/Postal code: 25234 /25470
- ^{1} French Land Register data, which excludes lakes, ponds, glaciers > 1 km^{2} (0.386 sq mi or 247 acres) and river estuaries.

Ferrières-le-Lac (French pronunciation: [fɛʁjɛʁ lə lak]) is a commune in the Doubs department in the Bourgogne-Franche-Comté region in eastern France.

== Population ==
Historical population
Year	Pop.	±% p.a.
1968	82	—
1975	77	−0.89%
1982	52	−5.45%
1990	73	+4.33%
1999	86	+1.84%
2007	142	+6.47%
2012	182	+5.09%
2017	172	−1.12%
2023	160	−1.20%
Source: INSEE

== See also ==
- Communes of the Doubs department
