= Valoreille =

- Commune
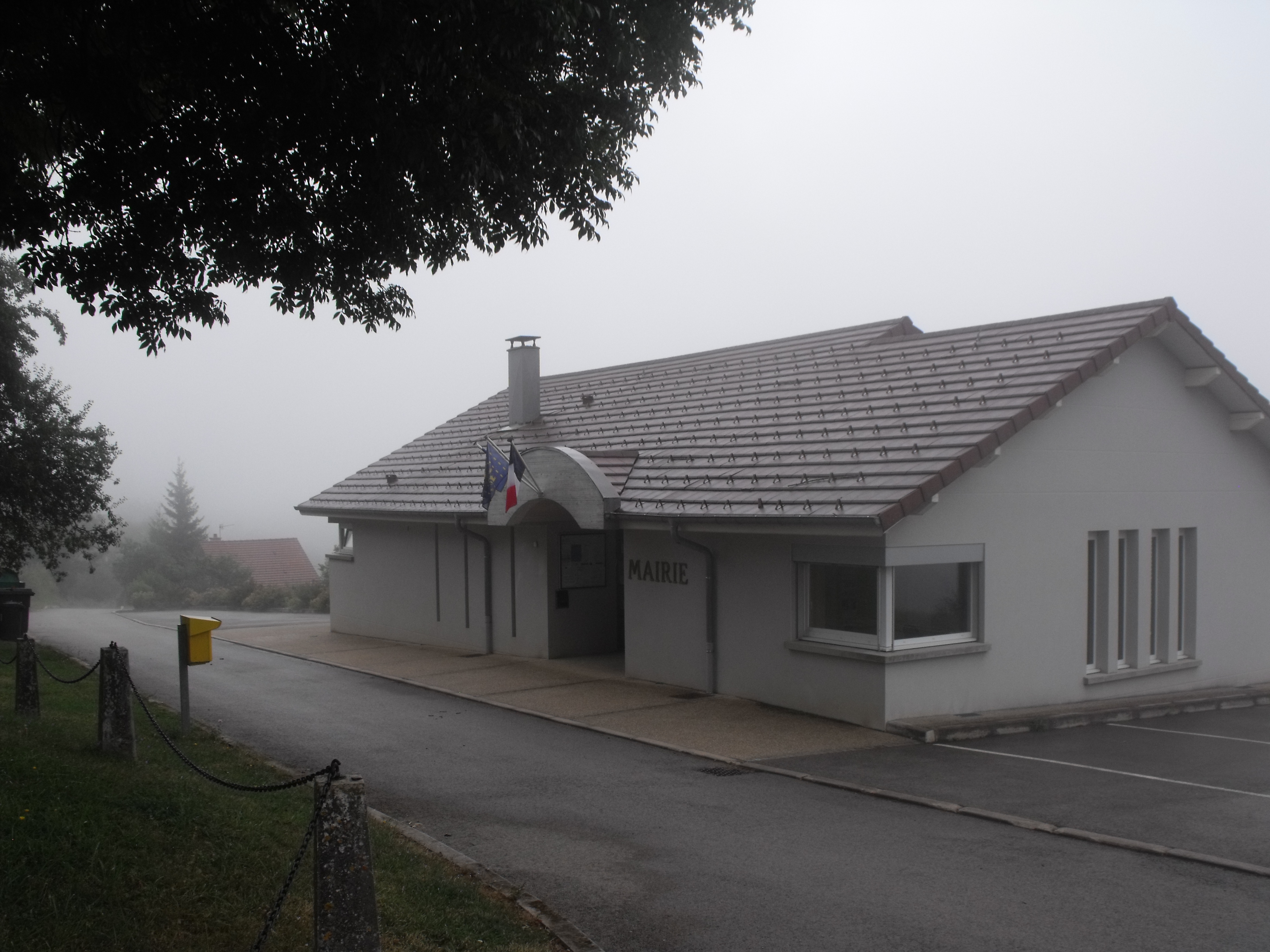
- The town hall in Valoreille
- Location of Valoreille
- Location within France Location within Bourgogne-Franche-Comté
- Coordinates: 47°18′04″N 6°44′37″E
- Country: France
- Region: Bourgogne-Franche-Comté
- Department: Doubs
- Arrondissement: Montbéliard
- Canton: Maîche

Government
  - Mayor (2024–2026): Patrick Boiteux
- Area^{1}: 7.58 km^{2} (2.93 sq mi)
- Highest elevation: 860 m (2,820 ft)
- Lowest elevation: 387 m (1,270 ft)
- Population (2023): 128
  - Density: 16.9/km^{2} (43.7/sq mi)
- Time zone: UTC+01:00 (CET)
  - Summer (DST): UTC+02:00 (CEST)
- INSEE/Postal code: 25584 /25190
- ^{1} French Land Register data, which excludes lakes, ponds, glaciers > 1 km^{2} (0.386 sq mi or 247 acres) and river estuaries.

Valoreille (French pronunciation: [valɔʁɛj]) is a commune in the Doubs department in the Bourgogne-Franche-Comté region in eastern France.

== Geography ==
Valoreille lies 9 km (5.6 mi) southwest of Saint-Hippolyte. It occupies the slope from the Dessoubre to the outlook of Montaigue, with its remarkable view of the Ballon d'Alsace and the gorge of the Dessoubre.

== Population ==
Historical population
Year	Pop.	±% p.a.
1968	107	—
1975	99	−1.10%
1982	110	+1.52%
1990	104	−0.70%
1999	90	−1.59%
2007	104	+1.82%
2012	120	+2.90%
2017	127	+1.14%
2023	128	+0.13%
Source: INSEE

== See also ==
- Communes of the Doubs department
