= Thiébouhans =

- Commune
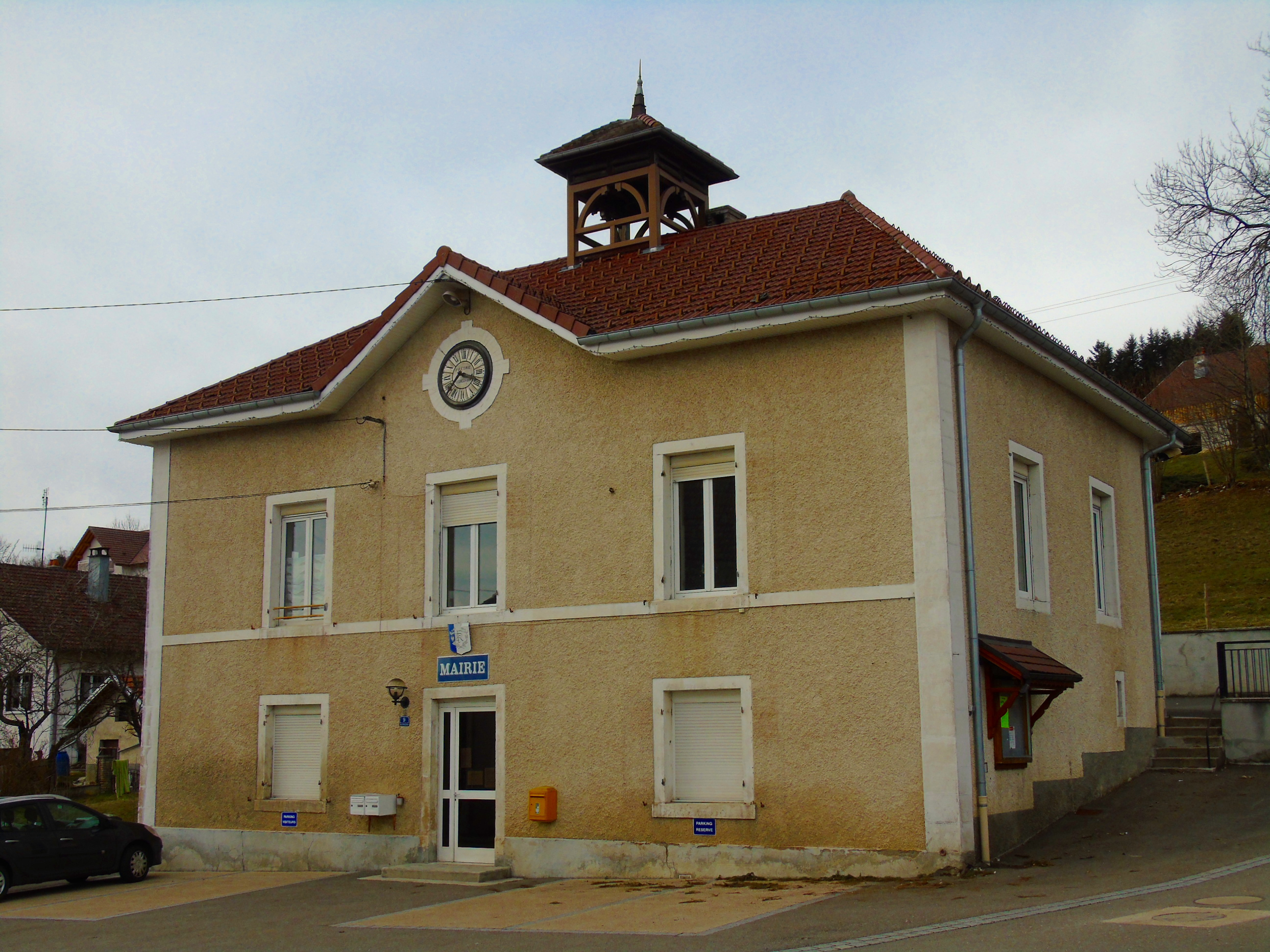
- The town hall in Thiébouhans
- Location of Thiébouhans
- Location within France Location within Bourgogne-Franche-Comté
- Coordinates: 47°16′54″N 6°50′50″E
- Country: France
- Region: Bourgogne-Franche-Comté
- Department: Doubs
- Arrondissement: Montbéliard
- Canton: Maîche

Government
  - Mayor (2020–2026): Isabelle Mougin
- Area^{1}: 5.81 km^{2} (2.24 sq mi)
- Highest elevation: 970 m (3,180 ft)
- Lowest elevation: 780 m (2,560 ft)
- Population (2023): 229
  - Density: 39.4/km^{2} (102/sq mi)
- Time zone: UTC+01:00 (CET)
  - Summer (DST): UTC+02:00 (CEST)
- INSEE/Postal code: 25559 /25470
- ^{1} French Land Register data, which excludes lakes, ponds, glaciers > 1 km^{2} (0.386 sq mi or 247 acres) and river estuaries.

Thiébouhans (French pronunciation: [tjebu.ɑ̃]) is a commune in the Doubs department in the Bourgogne-Franche-Comté region in eastern France.

== Geography ==
The communes lies 6 km (3.7 mi) northwest of Maîche and 13 km (8.1 mi) from the Swiss border.

== Population ==
Historical population
Year	Pop.	±% p.a.
1968	155	—
1975	139	−1.54%
1982	157	+1.75%
1990	171	+1.07%
1999	185	+0.88%
2007	226	+2.53%
2012	235	+0.78%
2017	256	+1.73%
2023	229	−1.84%
Source: INSEE

== See also ==
- Communes of the Doubs department
