= Pierrefontaine-lès-Blamont =

- Commune
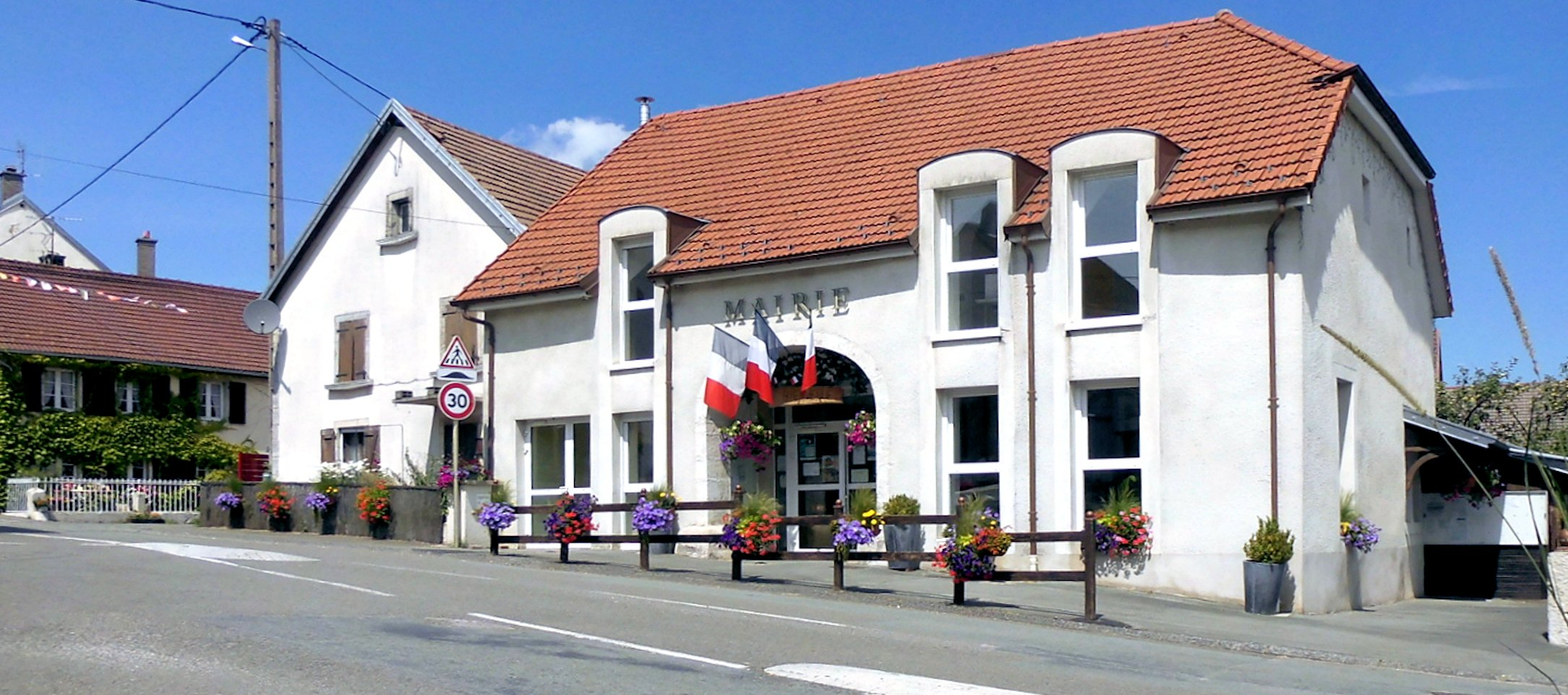
- The town hall in Pierrefontaine-lès-Blamont

- Coat of arms
- Location of Pierrefontaine-lès-Blamont
- Location within France Location within Bourgogne-Franche-Comté
- Coordinates: 47°22′35″N 6°50′23″E
- Country: France
- Region: Bourgogne-Franche-Comté
- Department: Doubs
- Arrondissement: Montbéliard
- Canton: Maîche
- Intercommunality: Pays de Montbéliard Agglomération

Government
  - Mayor (2020–2026): Catherine Meunier
- Area^{1}: 8.96 km^{2} (3.46 sq mi)
- Highest elevation: 835 m (2,740 ft)
- Lowest elevation: 490 m (1,610 ft)
- Population (2023): 484
  - Density: 54.0/km^{2} (140/sq mi)
- Time zone: UTC+01:00 (CET)
  - Summer (DST): UTC+02:00 (CEST)
- INSEE/Postal code: 25452 /25310
- ^{1} French Land Register data, which excludes lakes, ponds, glaciers > 1 km^{2} (0.386 sq mi or 247 acres) and river estuaries.

Pierrefontaine-lès-Blamont (French pronunciation: [pjɛʁfɔ̃tɛn lɛ blamɔ̃], literally Pierrefontaine near Blamont) is a commune in the Doubs department in the Bourgogne-Franche-Comté region in eastern France.

== Population ==
Historical population
Year	Pop.	±% p.a.
1968	201	—
1975	190	−0.80%
1982	190	+0.00%
1990	235	+2.69%
1999	304	+2.90%
2007	388	+3.10%
2012	405	+0.86%
2017	468	+2.93%
2023	484	+0.56%
Source: INSEE

== See also ==
- Blamont
- Communes of the Doubs department
