= Autechaux-Roide =

- Commune
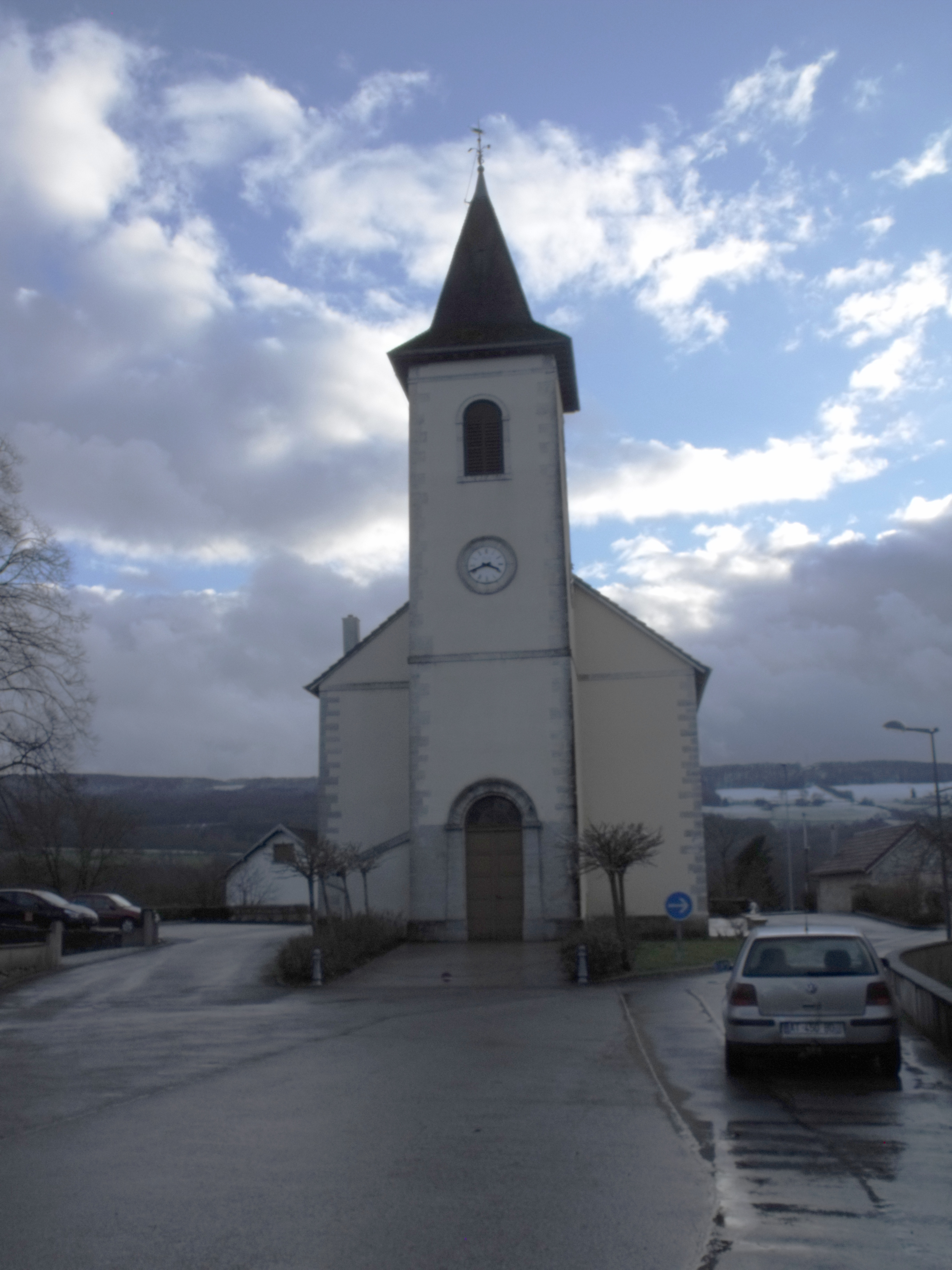
- The church in Autechaux-Roide

- Coat of arms
- Location of Autechaux-Roide
- Location within France Location within Bourgogne-Franche-Comté
- Coordinates: 47°23′34″N 6°48′55″E
- Country: France
- Region: Bourgogne-Franche-Comté
- Department: Doubs
- Arrondissement: Montbéliard
- Canton: Maîche
- Intercommunality: Pays Montbéliard Agglomération

Government
  - Mayor (2020–2026): Pascal Tournoux
- Area^{1}: 6.56 km^{2} (2.53 sq mi)
- Highest elevation: 575 m (1,886 ft)
- Lowest elevation: 363 m (1,191 ft)
- Population (2023): 487
  - Density: 74.2/km^{2} (192/sq mi)
- Time zone: UTC+01:00 (CET)
  - Summer (DST): UTC+02:00 (CEST)
- INSEE/Postal code: 25033 /25150
- ^{1} French Land Register data, which excludes lakes, ponds, glaciers > 1 km^{2} (0.386 sq mi or 247 acres) and river estuaries.

Autechaux-Roide (French pronunciation: [ot.ʃo ʁwad]) is a commune in the Doubs department in the Bourgogne-Franche-Comté region in eastern France.

== Population ==
Historical population
Year	Pop.	±% p.a.
1968	348	—
1975	518	+5.85%
1982	560	+1.12%
1990	541	−0.43%
1999	546	+0.10%
2007	568	+0.50%
2012	550	−0.64%
2017	523	−1.00%
2023	487	−1.18%
Source: INSEE

== See also ==
- Communes of the Doubs department
