= Courtefontaine, Doubs =

Courtefontaine
- Commune
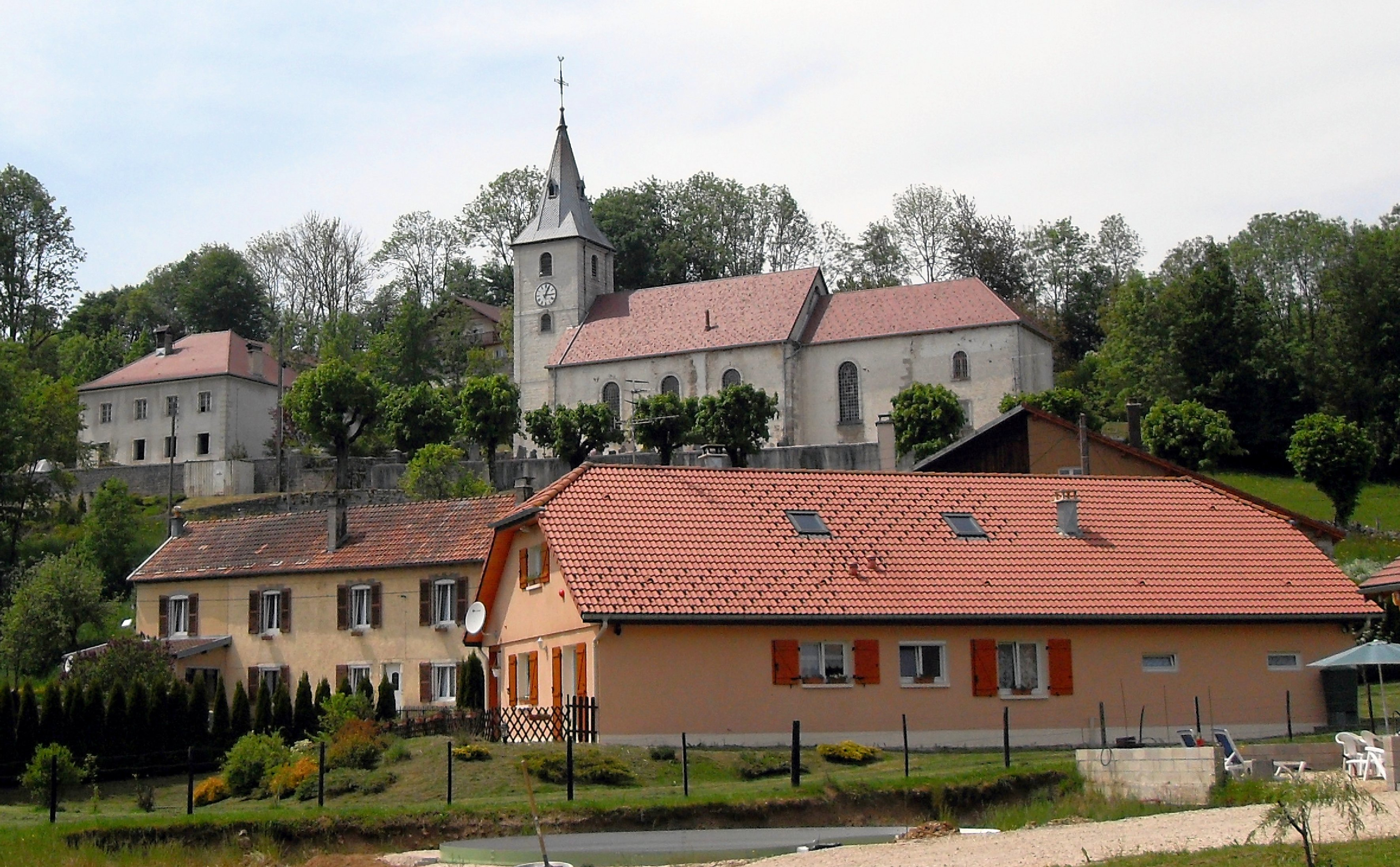
- The church and surroundings in Courtefontaine

- Coat of arms
- Location of Courtefontaine
- Location within France Location within Bourgogne-Franche-Comté
- Coordinates: 47°19′17″N 6°54′32″E
- Country: France
- Region: Bourgogne-Franche-Comté
- Department: Doubs
- Arrondissement: Montbéliard
- Canton: Maîche

Government
  - Mayor (2024–2026): Sebastien Wolff
- Area^{1}: 7.7 km^{2} (3.0 sq mi)
- Highest elevation: 920 m (3,020 ft)
- Lowest elevation: 668 m (2,192 ft)
- Population (2023): 247
  - Density: 32/km^{2} (83/sq mi)
- Time zone: UTC+01:00 (CET)
  - Summer (DST): UTC+02:00 (CEST)
- INSEE/Postal code: 25174 /25470
- ^{1} French Land Register data, which excludes lakes, ponds, glaciers > 1 km^{2} (0.386 sq mi or 247 acres) and river estuaries.

Courtefontaine (French pronunciation: [kuʁtəfɔ̃tɛn]) is a commune in the Doubs department in the Bourgogne-Franche-Comté region in eastern France.

== Population ==
Historical population
Year	Pop.	±% p.a.
1968	196	—
1975	215	+1.33%
1982	240	+1.58%
1990	230	−0.53%
1999	215	−0.75%
2007	232	+0.96%
2012	239	+0.60%
2017	246	+0.58%
2023	247	+0.07%
Source: INSEE

== See also ==
- Communes of the Doubs department
