= Saint-Maurice-Colombier =

- Commune
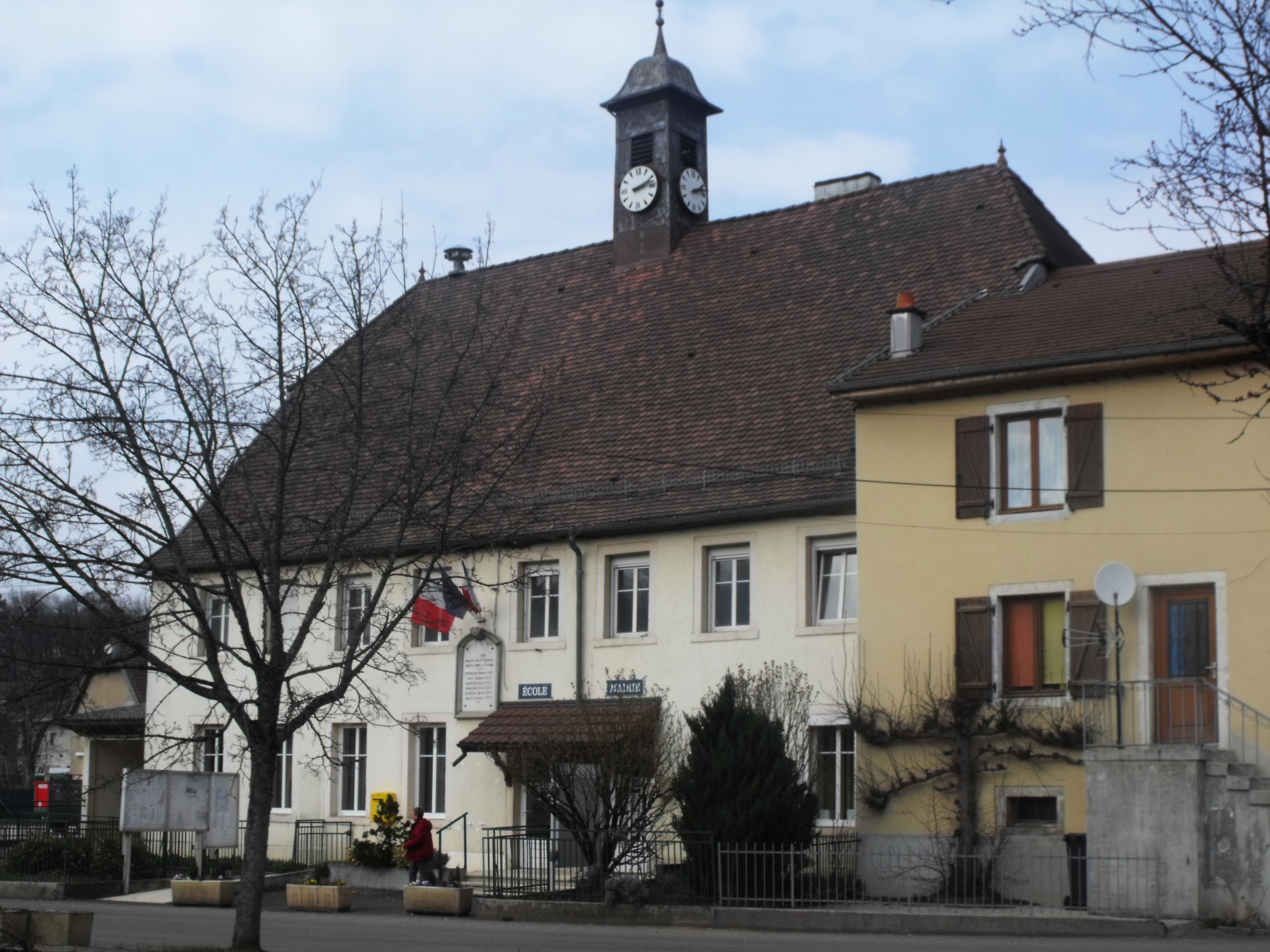
- The town hall in Saint-Maurice-Colombier

- Coat of arms
- Location of Saint-Maurice-Colombier
- Location within France Location within Bourgogne-Franche-Comté
- Coordinates: 47°26′34″N 6°38′43″E
- Country: France
- Region: Bourgogne-Franche-Comté
- Department: Doubs
- Arrondissement: Montbéliard
- Canton: Bavans
- Intercommunality: Pays de Montbéliard Agglomération

Government
  - Mayor (2020–2026): Jacques Demangeon
- Area^{1}: 13.29 km^{2} (5.13 sq mi)
- Highest elevation: 491 m (1,611 ft)
- Lowest elevation: 292 m (958 ft)
- Population (2023): 875
  - Density: 65.8/km^{2} (171/sq mi)
- Time zone: UTC+01:00 (CET)
  - Summer (DST): UTC+02:00 (CEST)
- INSEE/Postal code: 25524 /25260
- ^{1} French Land Register data, which excludes lakes, ponds, glaciers > 1 km^{2} (0.386 sq mi or 247 acres) and river estuaries.

Saint-Maurice-Colombier (French pronunciation: [sɛ̃ mɔʁis kɔlɔ̃bje]) is a commune in the Doubs department in the Bourgogne-Franche-Comté region in eastern France.

== Geography ==
The commune lies 7 km (4.3 mi) north of L'Isle-sur-le-Doubs.

== History ==
The commune was formed by merging the former communes of Saint-Maurice-Échelotte and Colombier-Châtelot in 1973.

== Population ==
Historical population
Year	Pop.	±% p.a.
1968	568	—
1975	598	+0.74%
1982	742	+3.13%
1990	729	−0.22%
1999	719	−0.15%
2007	867	+2.37%
2012	897	+0.68%
2017	907	+0.22%
2023	875	−0.60%
Source: INSEE

== See also ==
- Colombier-Fontaine
- Communes of the Doubs department
