= Vernois-lès-Belvoir =

- Commune
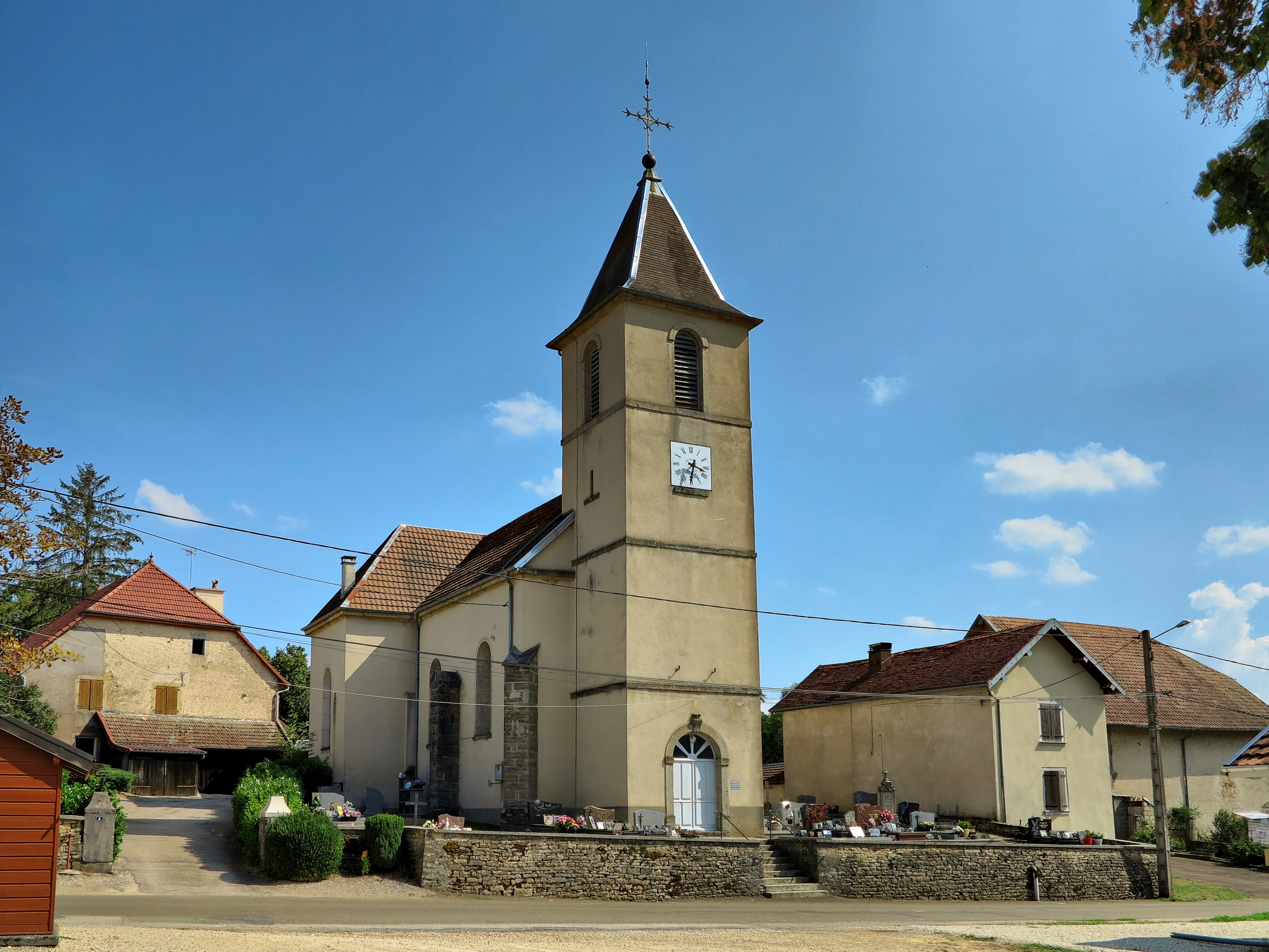
- The church in Vernois-lès-Belvoir
- Location of Vernois-lès-Belvoir
- Location within France Location within Bourgogne-Franche-Comté
- Coordinates: 47°19′43″N 6°38′27″E
- Country: France
- Region: Bourgogne-Franche-Comté
- Department: Doubs
- Arrondissement: Montbéliard
- Canton: Bavans
- Intercommunality: Pays de Sancey-Belleherbe

Government
  - Mayor (2020–2026): Francis Choulet
- Area^{1}: 4.68 km^{2} (1.81 sq mi)
- Highest elevation: 652 m (2,139 ft)
- Lowest elevation: 470 m (1,540 ft)
- Population (2023): 50
  - Density: 11/km^{2} (28/sq mi)
- Time zone: UTC+01:00 (CET)
  - Summer (DST): UTC+02:00 (CEST)
- INSEE/Postal code: 25607 /25430
- ^{1} French Land Register data, which excludes lakes, ponds, glaciers > 1 km^{2} (0.386 sq mi or 247 acres) and river estuaries.

Vernois-lès-Belvoir (French pronunciation: [vɛʁnwa lɛ bɛlvwaʁ], literally Vernois near Belvoir) is a commune in the Doubs department in the Bourgogne-Franche-Comté region in eastern France.

== Population ==
Historical population
Year	Pop.	±% p.a.
1968	97	—
1975	74	−3.79%
1982	67	−1.41%
1990	54	−2.66%
1999	56	+0.40%
2007	66	+2.08%
2012	61	−1.56%
2017	60	−0.33%
2023	50	−2.99%
Source: INSEE

== See also ==
- Belvoir
- Communes of the Doubs department
