= Médière =

- Commune
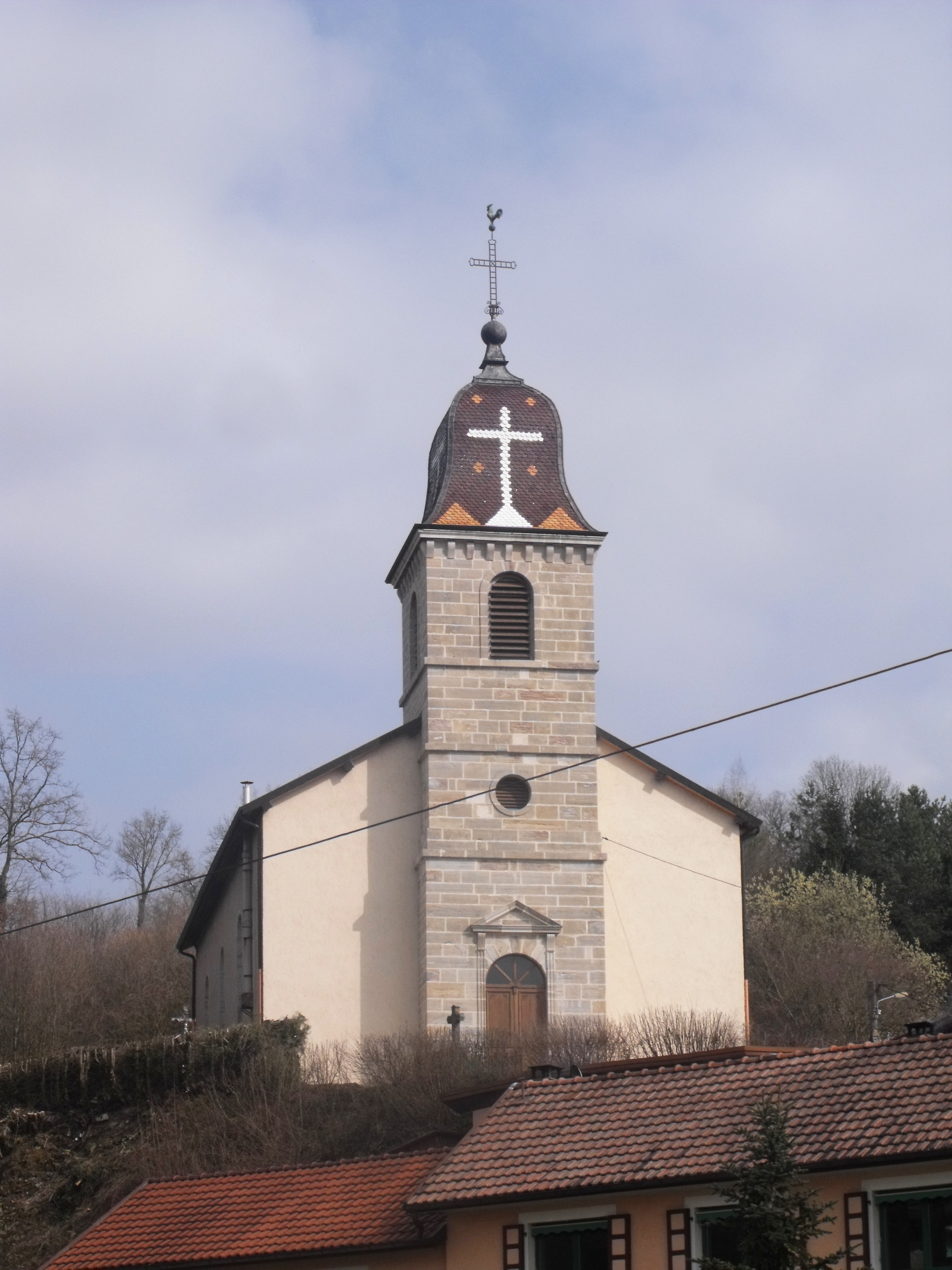
- The church in Médière

- Coat of arms
- Location of Médière
- Location within France Location within Bourgogne-Franche-Comté
- Coordinates: 47°27′27″N 6°35′57″E
- Country: France
- Region: Bourgogne-Franche-Comté
- Department: Doubs
- Arrondissement: Montbéliard
- Canton: Bavans

Government
  - Mayor (2020–2026): Christophe Bouvier
- Area^{1}: 5.73 km^{2} (2.21 sq mi)
- Highest elevation: 434 m (1,424 ft)
- Lowest elevation: 288 m (945 ft)
- Population (2023): 281
  - Density: 49.0/km^{2} (127/sq mi)
- Time zone: UTC+01:00 (CET)
  - Summer (DST): UTC+02:00 (CEST)
- INSEE/Postal code: 25372 /25250
- ^{1} French Land Register data, which excludes lakes, ponds, glaciers > 1 km^{2} (0.386 sq mi or 247 acres) and river estuaries.

Médière (French pronunciation: [medjɛʁ]) is a commune in the Doubs department in the Bourgogne-Franche-Comté region in eastern France.

== Geography ==
The commune liest 2 km (1.2 mi) northeast of L'Isle-sur-le-Doubs on the banks of the Doubs.

== Population ==
Historical population
Year	Pop.	±% p.a.
1968	313	—
1975	362	+2.10%
1982	305	−2.42%
1990	327	+0.87%
1999	314	−0.45%
2007	325	+0.43%
2012	319	−0.37%
2017	284	−2.30%
2023	281	−0.18%
Source: INSEE

== See also ==
- Communes of the Doubs department
