= Charmoille =

Charmoille may refer to:

France

- Charmoille, Doubs
- Charmoille, Haute-Saône

Switzerland

- Charmoille, Switzerland
