= Rang, Doubs =

Rang
- Commune
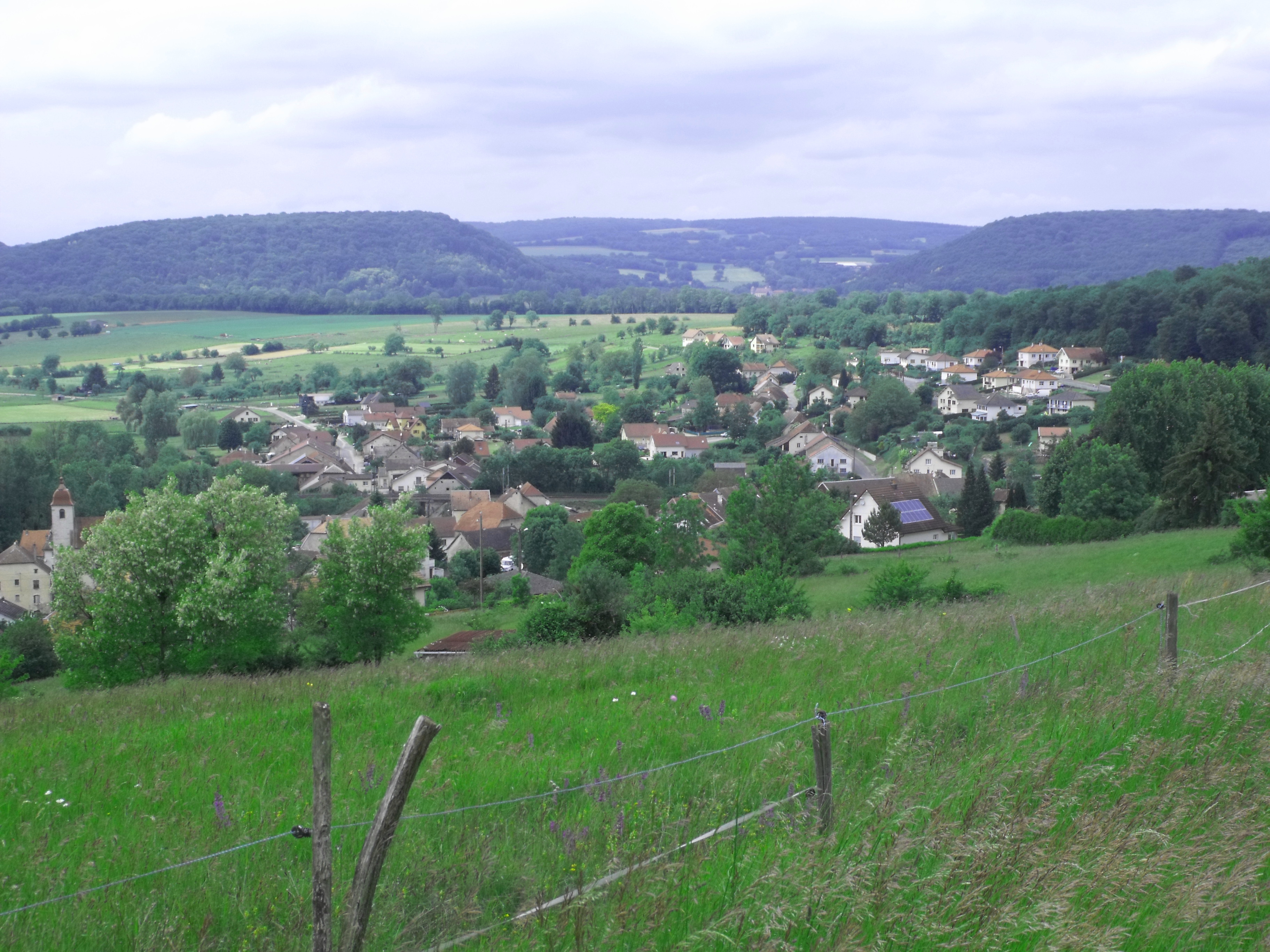
- A general view of Rang

- Coat of arms
- Location of Rang
- Location within France Location within Bourgogne-Franche-Comté
- Coordinates: 47°25′38″N 6°33′48″E
- Country: France
- Region: Bourgogne-Franche-Comté
- Department: Doubs
- Arrondissement: Montbéliard
- Canton: Bavans

Government
  - Mayor (2020–2026): Didier Gaiffe
- Area^{1}: 10.32 km^{2} (3.98 sq mi)
- Highest elevation: 524 m (1,719 ft)
- Lowest elevation: 280 m (920 ft)
- Population (2023): 389
  - Density: 37.7/km^{2} (97.6/sq mi)
- Time zone: UTC+01:00 (CET)
  - Summer (DST): UTC+02:00 (CEST)
- INSEE/Postal code: 25479 /25250
- ^{1} French Land Register data, which excludes lakes, ponds, glaciers > 1 km^{2} (0.386 sq mi or 247 acres) and river estuaries.

Rang (French pronunciation: [ʁɑ̃]) is a commune in the Doubs department in the Bourgogne-Franche-Comté region in eastern France.

== Geography ==
Rang lies 4 km (2.5 mi) from L'Isle-sur-le-Doubs in a promontory formed by the meandering of the Doubs. It also lies on the Rhône-Rhine Canal.

== Population ==
Historical population
Year	Pop.	±% p.a.
1968	405	—
1975	469	+2.12%
1982	518	+1.43%
1990	474	−1.10%
1999	450	−0.58%
2007	396	−1.59%
2012	438	+2.04%
2017	418	−0.93%
2023	389	−1.19%
Source: INSEE

== See also ==
- Communes of the Doubs department
