= Lanthenans =

- Commune
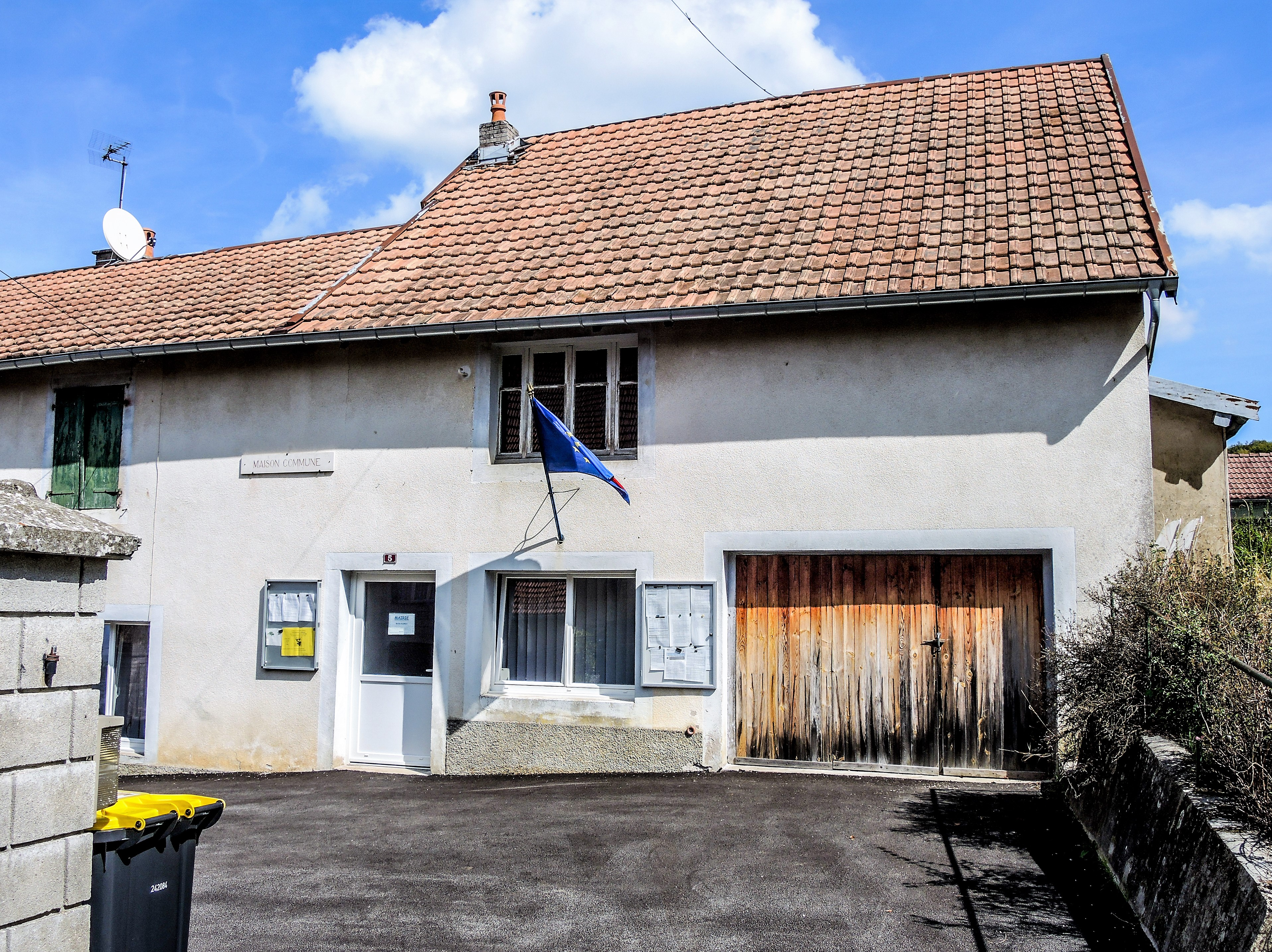
- The town hall in Lanthenans

- Coat of arms
- Location of Lanthenans
- Location within France Location within Bourgogne-Franche-Comté
- Coordinates: 47°23′44″N 6°37′41″E
- Country: France
- Region: Bourgogne-Franche-Comté
- Department: Doubs
- Arrondissement: Montbéliard
- Canton: Bavans

Government
  - Mayor (2020–2026): Jeanne-Antide Felez
- Area^{1}: 3.36 km^{2} (1.30 sq mi)
- Highest elevation: 592 m (1,942 ft)
- Lowest elevation: 389 m (1,276 ft)
- Population (2023): 68
  - Density: 20/km^{2} (52/sq mi)
- Time zone: UTC+01:00 (CET)
  - Summer (DST): UTC+02:00 (CEST)
- INSEE/Postal code: 25327 /25250
- ^{1} French Land Register data, which excludes lakes, ponds, glaciers > 1 km^{2} (0.386 sq mi or 247 acres) and river estuaries.

Lanthenans (French pronunciation: [lɑ̃tnɑ̃]) is a commune in the Doubs department in the Bourgogne-Franche-Comté region in eastern France.

== Geography ==
The commune lies on a sunny slope with an exceptional microclimate and equidistant from L'Isle-sur-le-Doubs, Pont-de-Roide, and Clerval.

== Population ==
Historical population
Year	Pop.	±% p.a.
1968	58	—
1975	79	+4.51%
1982	66	−2.54%
1990	60	−1.18%
1999	65	+0.89%
2007	65	+0.00%
2012	66	+0.31%
2017	68	+0.60%
2023	68	+0.00%
Source: INSEE

== See also ==
- Communes of the Doubs department
