= Soye, Doubs =

Soye
- Commune
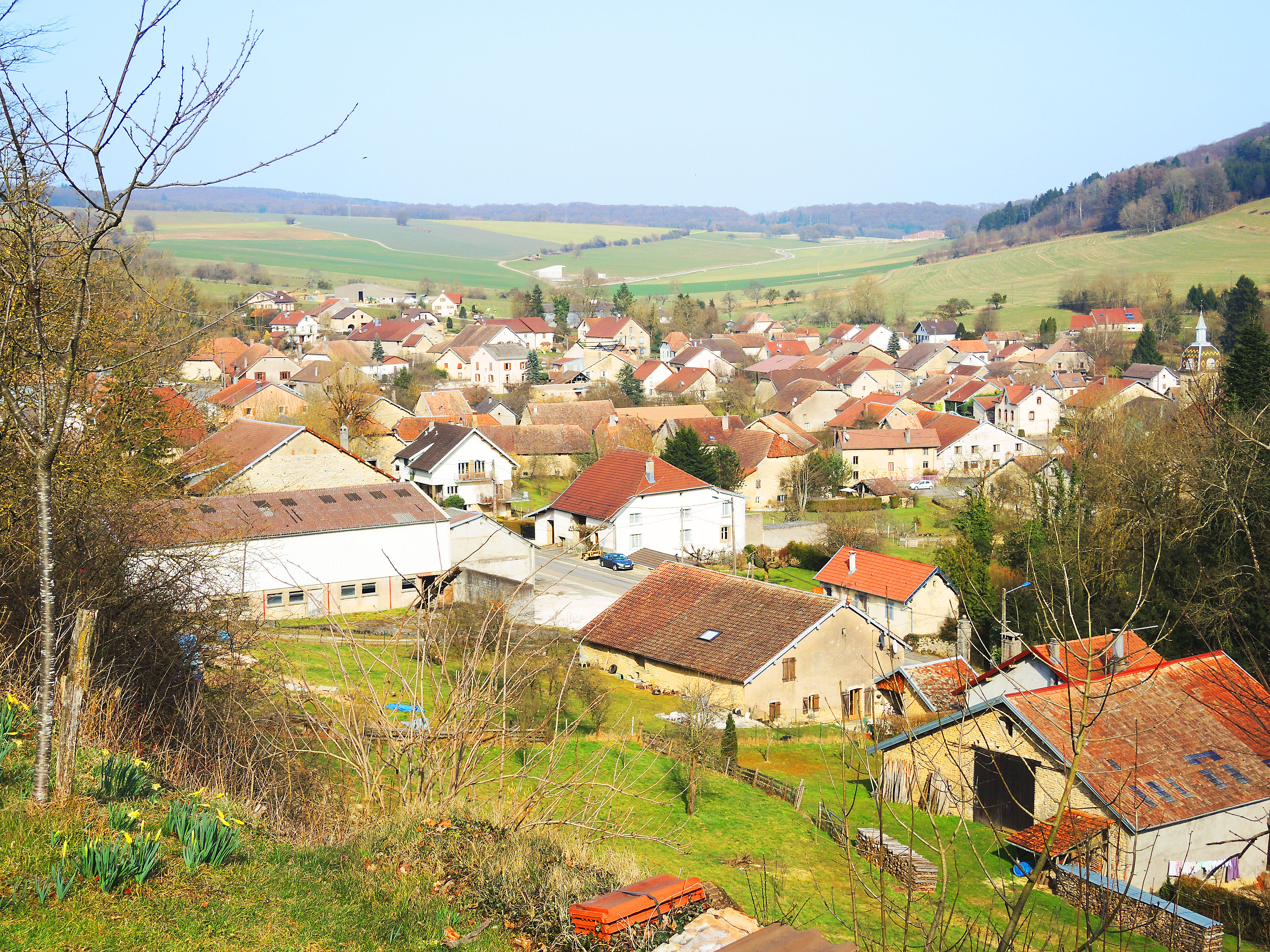
- A general view of Soye

- Coat of arms
- Location of Soye
- Location within France Location within Bourgogne-Franche-Comté
- Coordinates: 47°26′43″N 6°29′56″E
- Country: France
- Region: Bourgogne-Franche-Comté
- Department: Doubs
- Arrondissement: Montbéliard
- Canton: Bavans

Government
  - Mayor (2020–2026): François Ciresa
- Area^{1}: 13.89 km^{2} (5.36 sq mi)
- Highest elevation: 507 m (1,663 ft)
- Lowest elevation: 287 m (942 ft)
- Population (2023): 360
  - Density: 26/km^{2} (67/sq mi)
- Time zone: UTC+01:00 (CET)
  - Summer (DST): UTC+02:00 (CEST)
- INSEE/Postal code: 25553 /25250
- ^{1} French Land Register data, which excludes lakes, ponds, glaciers > 1 km^{2} (0.386 sq mi or 247 acres) and river estuaries.

Soye (French pronunciation: [swa]) is a commune in the Doubs department in the Bourgogne-Franche-Comté region in eastern France.

== Geography ==
Soye lies 8 km (5.0 mi) west of L'Isle-sur-le-Doubs.

== Population ==
Historical population
Year	Pop.	±% p.a.
1968	230	—
1975	218	−0.76%
1982	238	+1.26%
1990	247	+0.47%
1999	252	+0.22%
2007	315	+2.83%
2012	379	+3.77%
2017	390	+0.57%
2023	360	−1.33%
Source: INSEE

== See also ==
- Communes of the Doubs department
