= Vellerot-lès-Belvoir =

- Commune
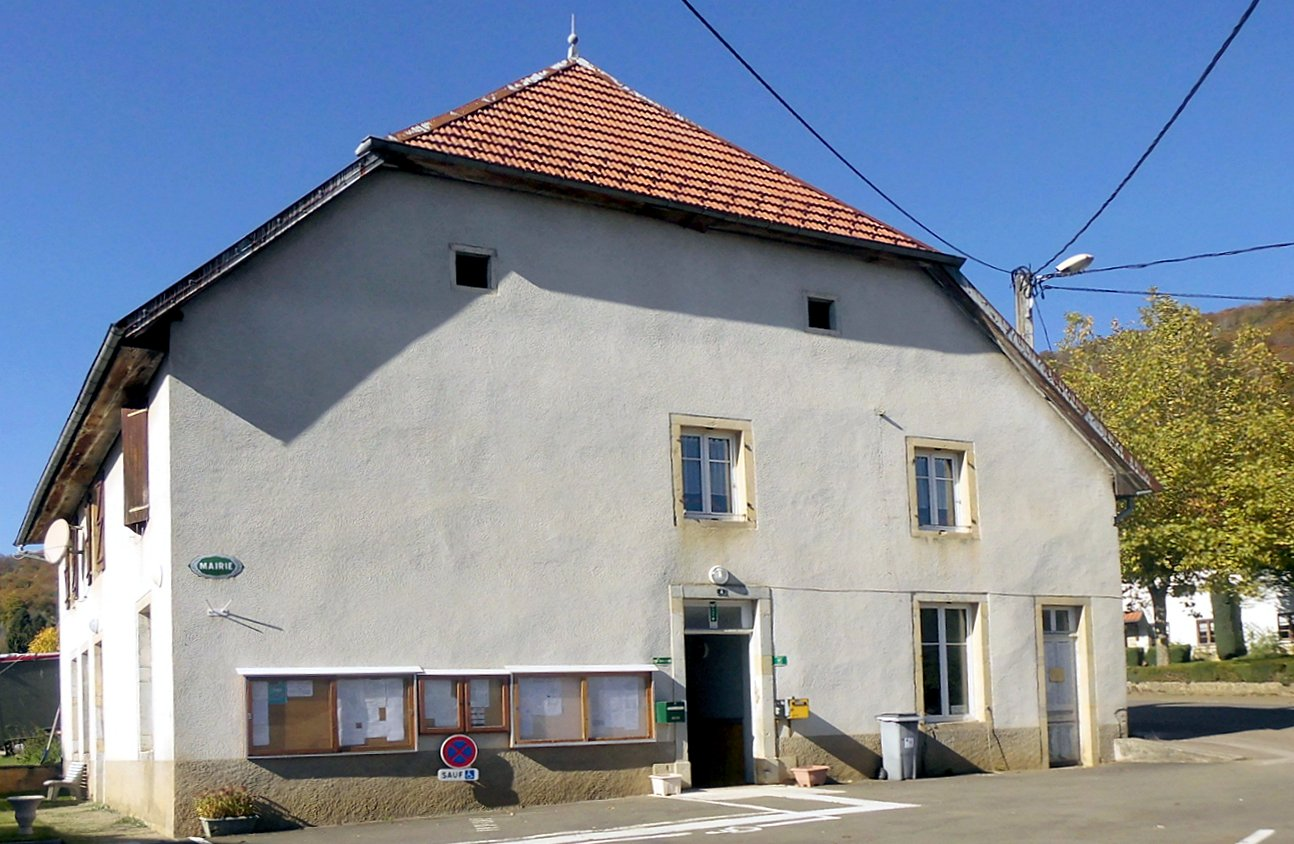
- The town hall in Vellerot-lès-Belvoir
- Location of Vellerot-lès-Belvoir
- Location within France Location within Bourgogne-Franche-Comté
- Coordinates: 47°21′02″N 6°36′06″E
- Country: France
- Region: Bourgogne-Franche-Comté
- Department: Doubs
- Arrondissement: Montbéliard
- Canton: Bavans

Government
  - Mayor (2020–2026): Roland Douriaux
- Area^{1}: 6.04 km^{2} (2.33 sq mi)
- Highest elevation: 843 m (2,766 ft)
- Lowest elevation: 559 m (1,834 ft)
- Population (2023): 95
  - Density: 16/km^{2} (41/sq mi)
- Time zone: UTC+01:00 (CET)
  - Summer (DST): UTC+02:00 (CEST)
- INSEE/Postal code: 25595 /25430
- ^{1} French Land Register data, which excludes lakes, ponds, glaciers > 1 km^{2} (0.386 sq mi or 247 acres) and river estuaries.

Vellerot-lès-Belvoir (French pronunciation: [vɛlʁo lɛ bɛlvwaʁ], literally Vellerot near Belvoir) is a commune in the Doubs department in the Bourgogne-Franche-Comté region in eastern France.

== Population ==
Historical population
Year	Pop.	±% p.a.
1968	137	—
1975	136	−0.10%
1982	144	+0.82%
1990	120	−2.25%
1999	121	+0.09%
2007	113	−0.85%
2012	111	−0.36%
2017	96	−2.86%
2023	95	−0.17%
Source: INSEE

== See also ==
- Belvoir
- Communes of the Doubs department
