= Rahon (disambiguation) =

Rahon may refer to the following places:

- Rahon, a town in Punjab, India
- in France:
  - Rahon, Doubs, a commune in the department of Doubs
  - Rahon, Jura, a commune in the department of Jura
