= Montenois =

- Commune
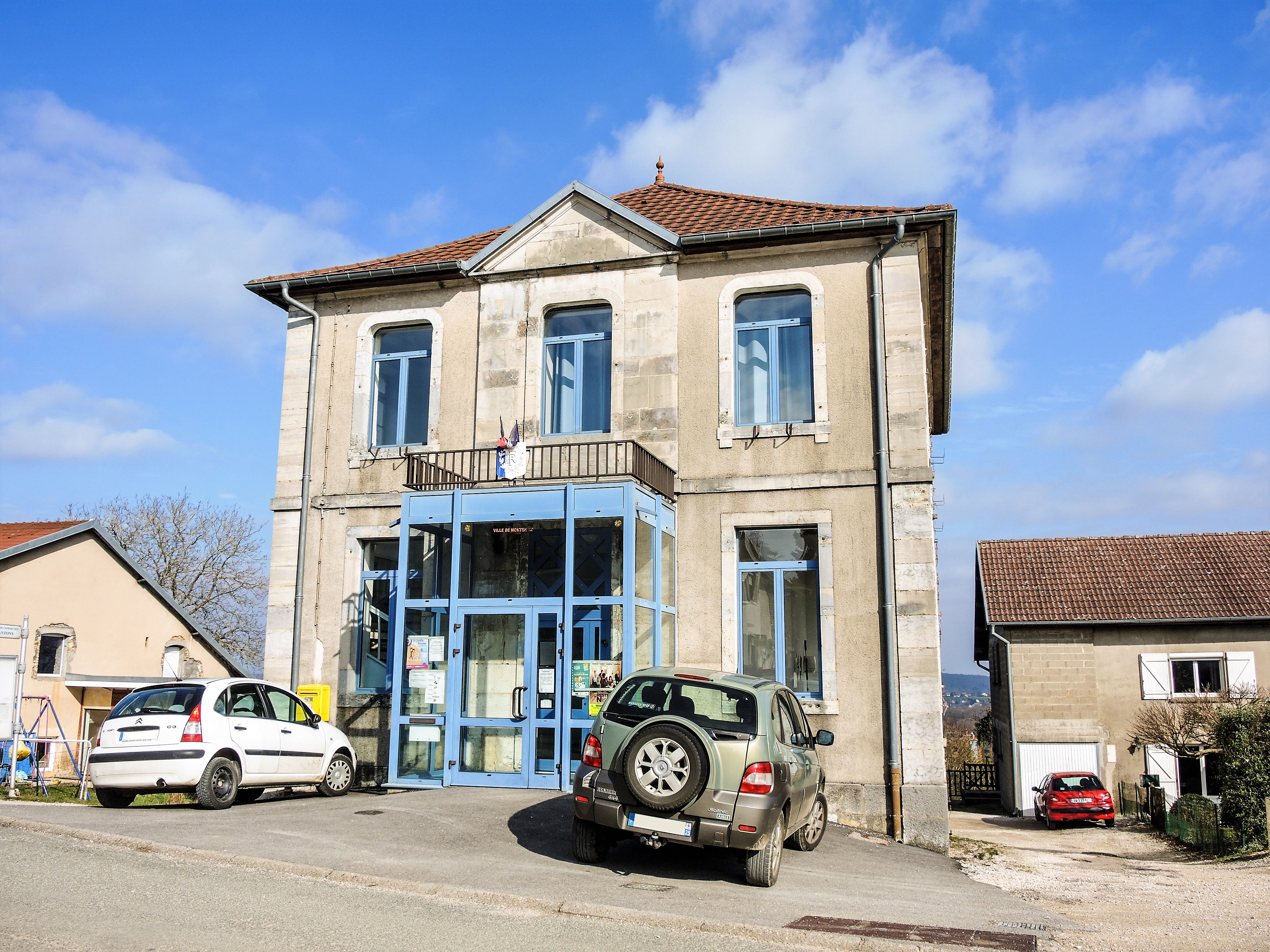
- The town hall in Montenois

- Coat of arms
- Location of Montenois
- Location within France Location within Bourgogne-Franche-Comté
- Coordinates: 47°29′38″N 6°40′01″E
- Country: France
- Region: Bourgogne-Franche-Comté
- Department: Doubs
- Arrondissement: Montbéliard
- Canton: Bavans
- Intercommunality: Pays de Montbéliard Agglomération

Government
  - Mayor (2020–2026): Mathieu Kalyntschuk
- Area^{1}: 8.03 km^{2} (3.10 sq mi)
- Highest elevation: 469 m (1,539 ft)
- Lowest elevation: 333 m (1,093 ft)
- Population (2023): 1,362
  - Density: 170/km^{2} (439/sq mi)
- Time zone: UTC+01:00 (CET)
  - Summer (DST): UTC+02:00 (CEST)
- INSEE/Postal code: 25394 /25260
- ^{1} French Land Register data, which excludes lakes, ponds, glaciers > 1 km^{2} (0.386 sq mi or 247 acres) and river estuaries.

Montenois (French pronunciation: [mɔ̃tnwa]) is a commune in the Doubs department in the Bourgogne-Franche-Comté region in eastern France.

== Geography ==
The commune lies 10 km (6.2 mi) north of L'Isle-sur-le-Doubs.

== Population ==
Historical population
Year	Pop.	±% p.a.
1968	568	—
1975	663	+2.23%
1982	773	+2.22%
1990	1,011	+3.41%
1999	1,099	+0.93%
2007	1,520	+4.14%
2012	1,523	+0.04%
2017	1,501	−0.29%
2023	1,362	−1.61%
Source: INSEE

== See also ==
- Communes of the Doubs department
