= Rahon, Doubs =

Rahon
- Commune
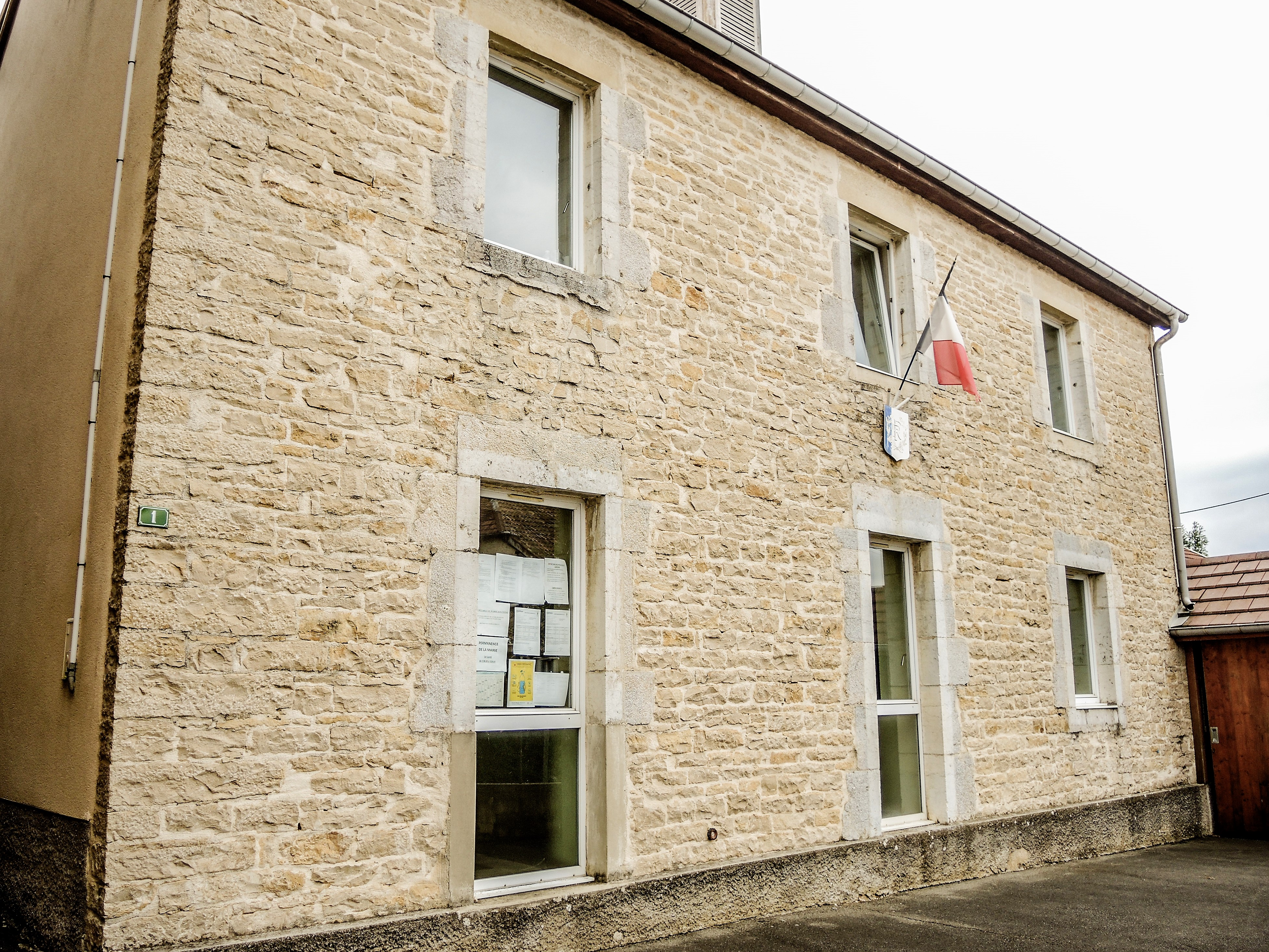
- The town hall in Rahon
- Location of Rahon
- Location within France Location within Bourgogne-Franche-Comté
- Coordinates: 47°19′24″N 6°35′30″E
- Country: France
- Region: Bourgogne-Franche-Comté
- Department: Doubs
- Arrondissement: Montbéliard
- Canton: Bavans

Government
  - Mayor (2020–2026): Noël Brand
- Area^{1}: 5.69 km^{2} (2.20 sq mi)
- Highest elevation: 664 m (2,178 ft)
- Lowest elevation: 489 m (1,604 ft)
- Population (2023): 140
  - Density: 25/km^{2} (64/sq mi)
- Time zone: UTC+01:00 (CET)
  - Summer (DST): UTC+02:00 (CEST)
- INSEE/Postal code: 25476 /25430
- ^{1} French Land Register data, which excludes lakes, ponds, glaciers > 1 km^{2} (0.386 sq mi or 247 acres) and river estuaries.

Rahon (French pronunciation: [ʁa.ɔ̃]) is a commune in the Doubs department in the Bourgogne-Franche-Comté region in eastern France.

== Geography ==
Rahon lies 20 km (12 mi) from Clerval at the foot of the castle of Belvoir built by Jean de Chalon.

== Population ==
Historical population
Year	Pop.	±% p.a.
1968	98	—
1975	101	+0.43%
1982	115	+1.87%
1990	112	−0.33%
1999	108	−0.40%
2007	107	−0.12%
2012	124	+2.99%
2017	126	+0.32%
2023	140	+1.77%
Source: INSEE

== See also ==
- Communes of the Doubs department
- Belvoir
