= Onans =

- Commune
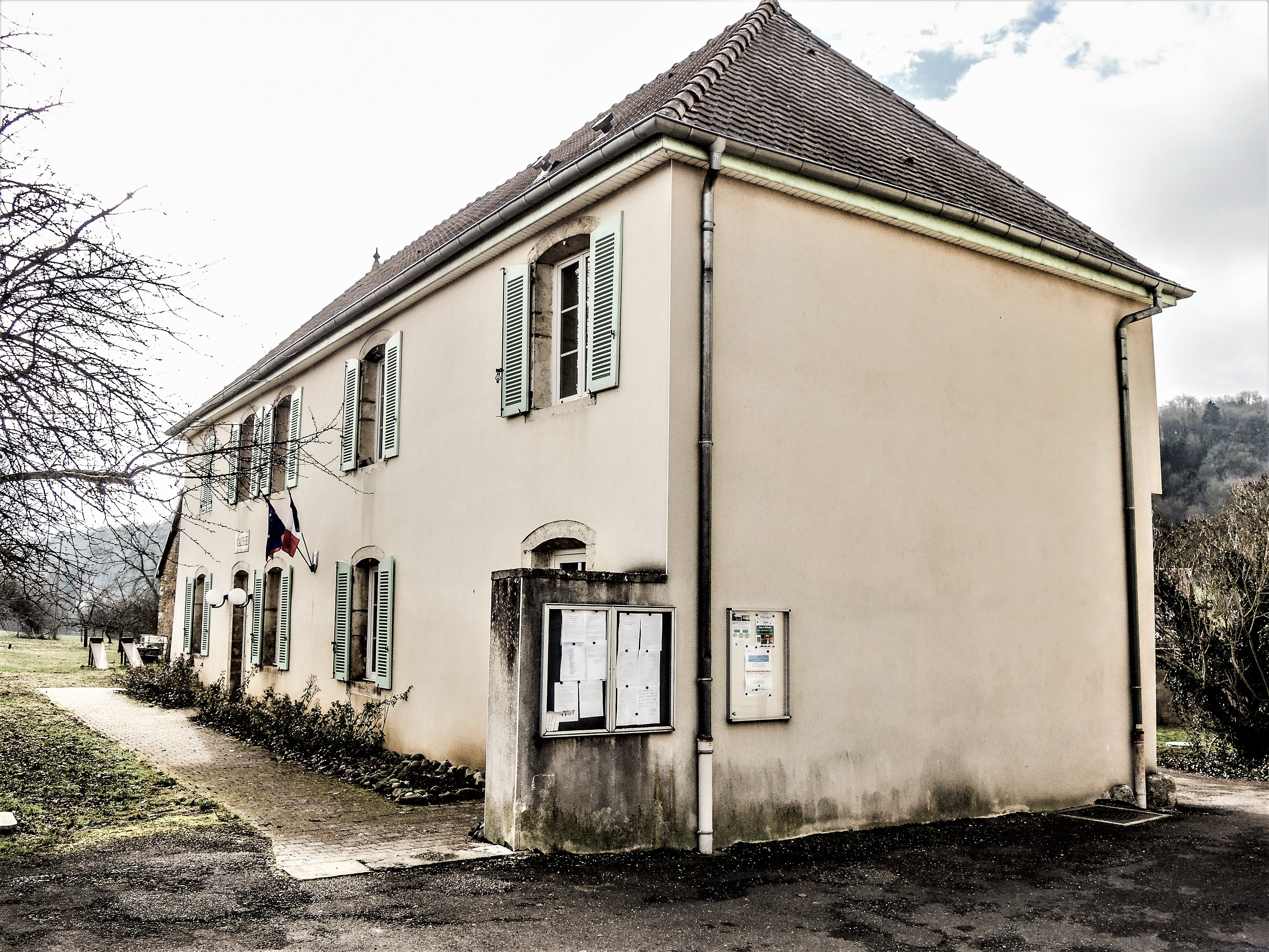
- The town hall in Onans

- Coat of arms
- Location of Onans
- Location within France Location within Bourgogne-Franche-Comté
- Coordinates: 47°30′11″N 6°36′38″E
- Country: France
- Region: Bourgogne-Franche-Comté
- Department: Doubs
- Arrondissement: Montbéliard
- Canton: Bavans

Government
  - Mayor (2020–2026): Claude Hueber
- Area^{1}: 14.21 km^{2} (5.49 sq mi)
- Highest elevation: 481 m (1,578 ft)
- Lowest elevation: 335 m (1,099 ft)
- Population (2023): 368
  - Density: 25.9/km^{2} (67.1/sq mi)
- Time zone: UTC+01:00 (CET)
  - Summer (DST): UTC+02:00 (CEST)
- INSEE/Postal code: 25431 /25250
- ^{1} French Land Register data, which excludes lakes, ponds, glaciers > 1 km^{2} (0.386 sq mi or 247 acres) and river estuaries.

Onans (French pronunciation: [ɔnɑ̃]) is a commune in the Doubs department in the Bourgogne-Franche-Comté region in eastern France.

== Population ==
Historical population
Year	Pop.	±% p.a.
1968	235	—
1975	246	+0.66%
1982	288	+2.28%
1990	358	+2.76%
1999	342	−0.51%
2007	369	+0.95%
2012	379	+0.54%
2017	349	−1.64%
2023	368	+0.89%
Source: INSEE

== See also ==
- Communes of the Doubs department
