= Saint-Georges-Armont =

- Commune
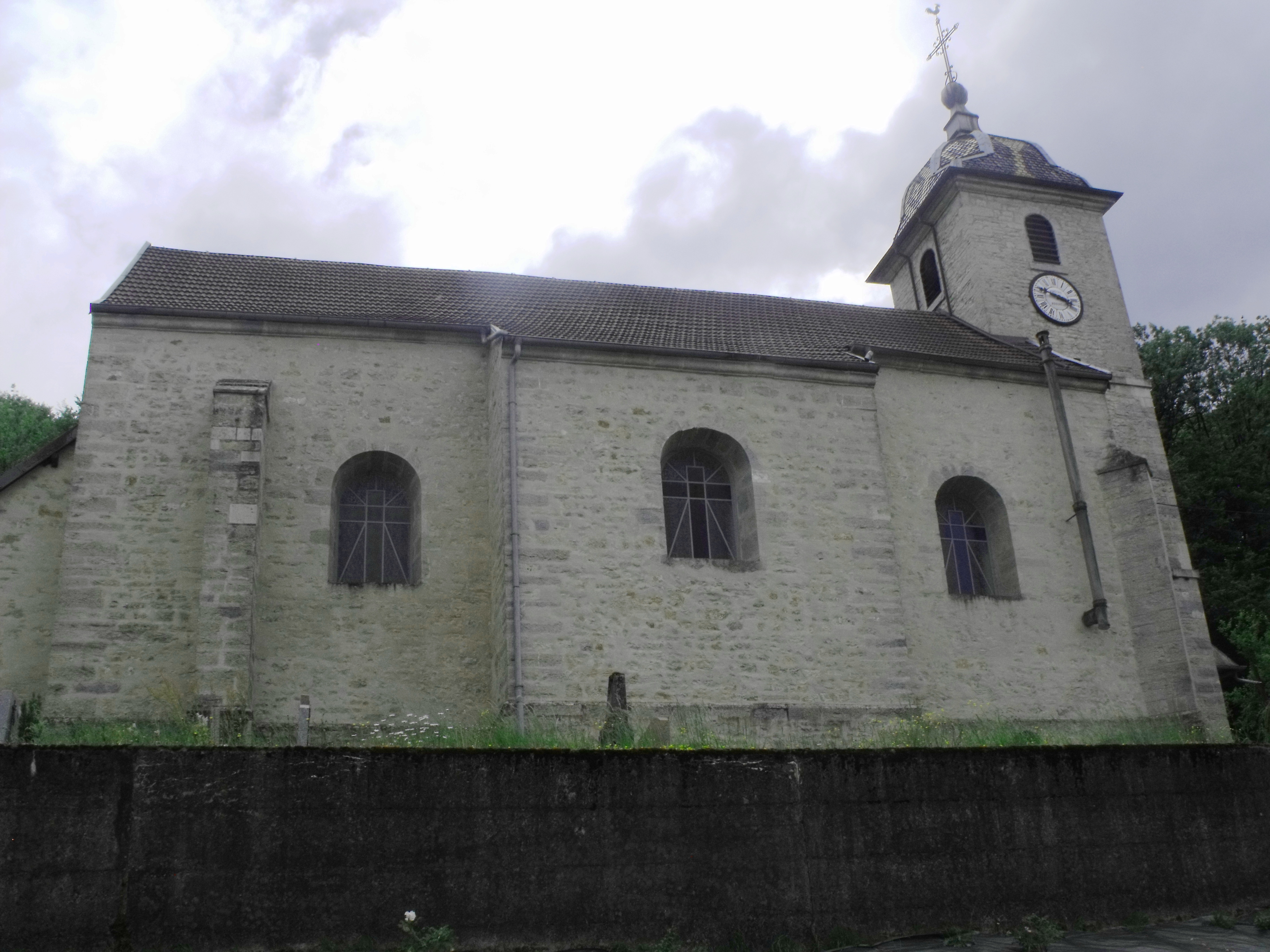
- The church in Saint-Georges-Armont

- Coat of arms
- Location of Saint-Georges-Armont
- Location within France Location within Bourgogne-Franche-Comté
- Coordinates: 47°23′58″N 6°33′27″E
- Country: France
- Region: Bourgogne-Franche-Comté
- Department: Doubs
- Arrondissement: Montbéliard
- Canton: Bavans

Government
  - Mayor (2020–2026): Christian Drouvot
- Area^{1}: 4.74 km^{2} (1.83 sq mi)
- Highest elevation: 550 m (1,800 ft)
- Lowest elevation: 278 m (912 ft)
- Population (2023): 122
  - Density: 25.7/km^{2} (66.7/sq mi)
- Time zone: UTC+01:00 (CET)
  - Summer (DST): UTC+02:00 (CEST)
- INSEE/Postal code: 25516 /25340
- ^{1} French Land Register data, which excludes lakes, ponds, glaciers > 1 km^{2} (0.386 sq mi or 247 acres) and river estuaries.

Saint-Georges-Armont (French pronunciation: [sɛ̃ ʒɔʁʒ aʁmɔ̃]) is a commune in the Doubs department in the Bourgogne-Franche-Comté region in eastern France.

== Geography ==
The commune liest 5 km (3.1 mi) east of Clerval.

== Population ==
Historical population
Year	Pop.	±% p.a.
1968	54	—
1975	63	+2.23%
1982	73	+2.13%
1990	94	+3.21%
1999	98	+0.46%
2007	102	+0.50%
2012	119	+3.13%
2017	120	+0.17%
2023	122	+0.28%
Source: INSEE

== See also ==
- Communes of the Doubs department
