= Jardin Paléobotanique =

Botanical garden in Franche-Comté, France

The Jardin Paléobotanique is a botanical garden located in Les Millières, Soulce-Cernay, Doubs, Franche-Comté, France. The garden contains about 500 types of plants, including rare species and prehistoric trees such as Ginkgo biloba. It is open Sundays and holidays in the warmer months; an admission fee is charged.

== See also ==
- List of botanical gardens in France
