= Charquemont =

- Commune
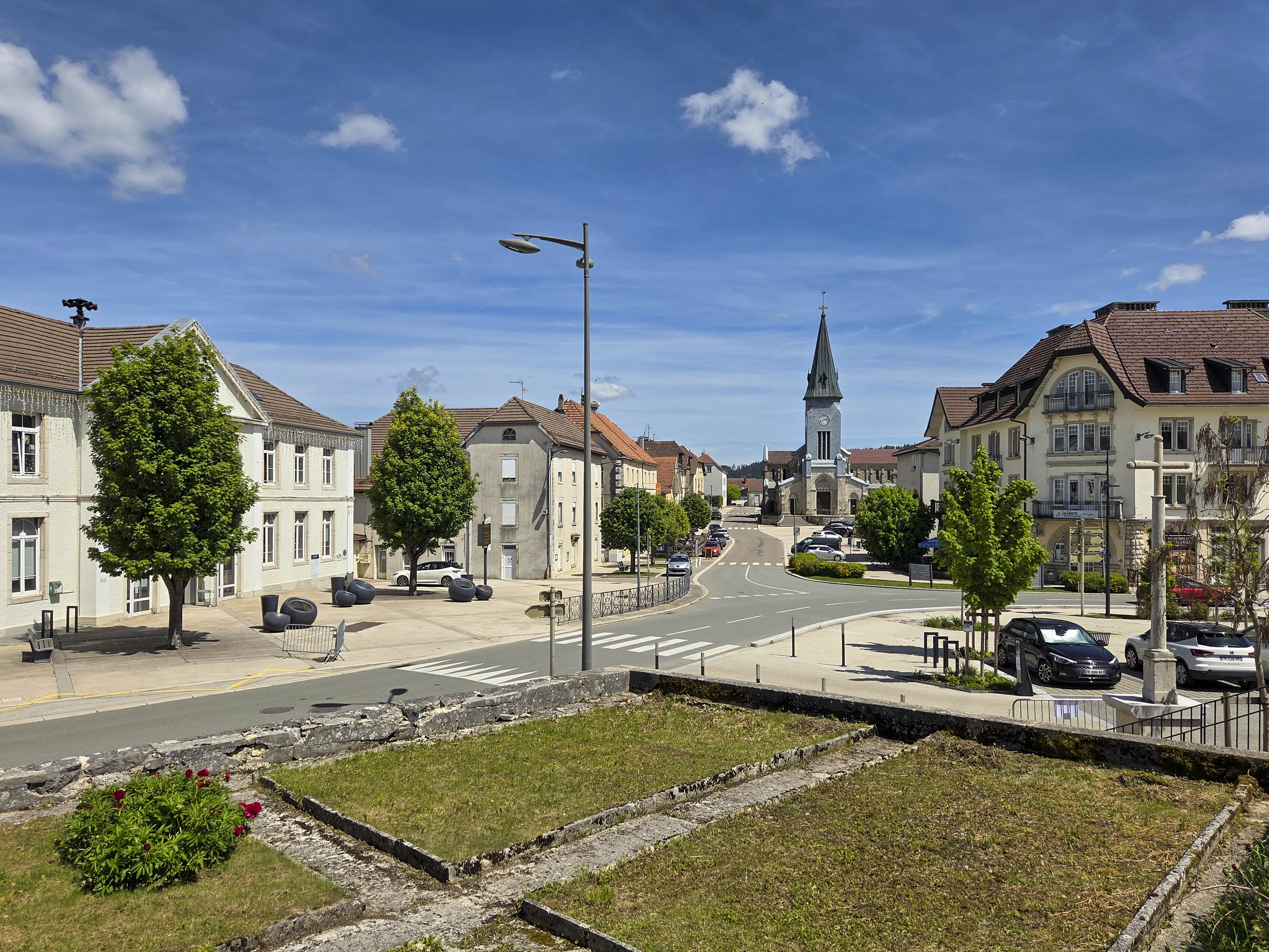
- The town centre around the Town Hall Square

- Coat of arms
- Location of Charquemont
- Location within France Location within Bourgogne-Franche-Comté
- Coordinates: 47°12′54″N 6°49′21″E
- Country: France
- Region: Bourgogne-Franche-Comté
- Department: Doubs
- Arrondissement: Montbéliard
- Canton: Maîche

Government
  - Mayor (2020–2026): Roland Martin
- Area^{1}: 21.44 km^{2} (8.28 sq mi)
- Highest elevation: 1,043 m (3,422 ft)
- Lowest elevation: 535 m (1,755 ft)
- Population (2023): 2,900
  - Density: 140/km^{2} (350/sq mi)
- Time zone: UTC+01:00 (CET)
  - Summer (DST): UTC+02:00 (CEST)
- INSEE/Postal code: 25127 /25140
- ^{1} French Land Register data, which excludes lakes, ponds, glaciers > 1 km^{2} (0.386 sq mi or 247 acres) and river estuaries.

Charquemont (French pronunciation: [ʃaʁkəmɔ̃]) is a commune in the Doubs department in the Bourgogne-Franche-Comté region in eastern France. In January 1973, it absorbed the former commune Le Boulois.

== Population ==
Population data refer to the commune in its geography as of January 2025.

Historical population
Year	Pop.	±% p.a.
1968	2,423	—
1975	2,485	+0.36%
1982	2,265	−1.32%
1990	2,205	−0.34%
1999	2,209	+0.02%
2007	2,413	+1.11%
2012	2,515	+0.83%
2017	2,668	+1.19%
2023	2,900	+1.40%
Source: INSEE

== See also ==
- Communes of the Doubs department
