= Glère =

- Commune
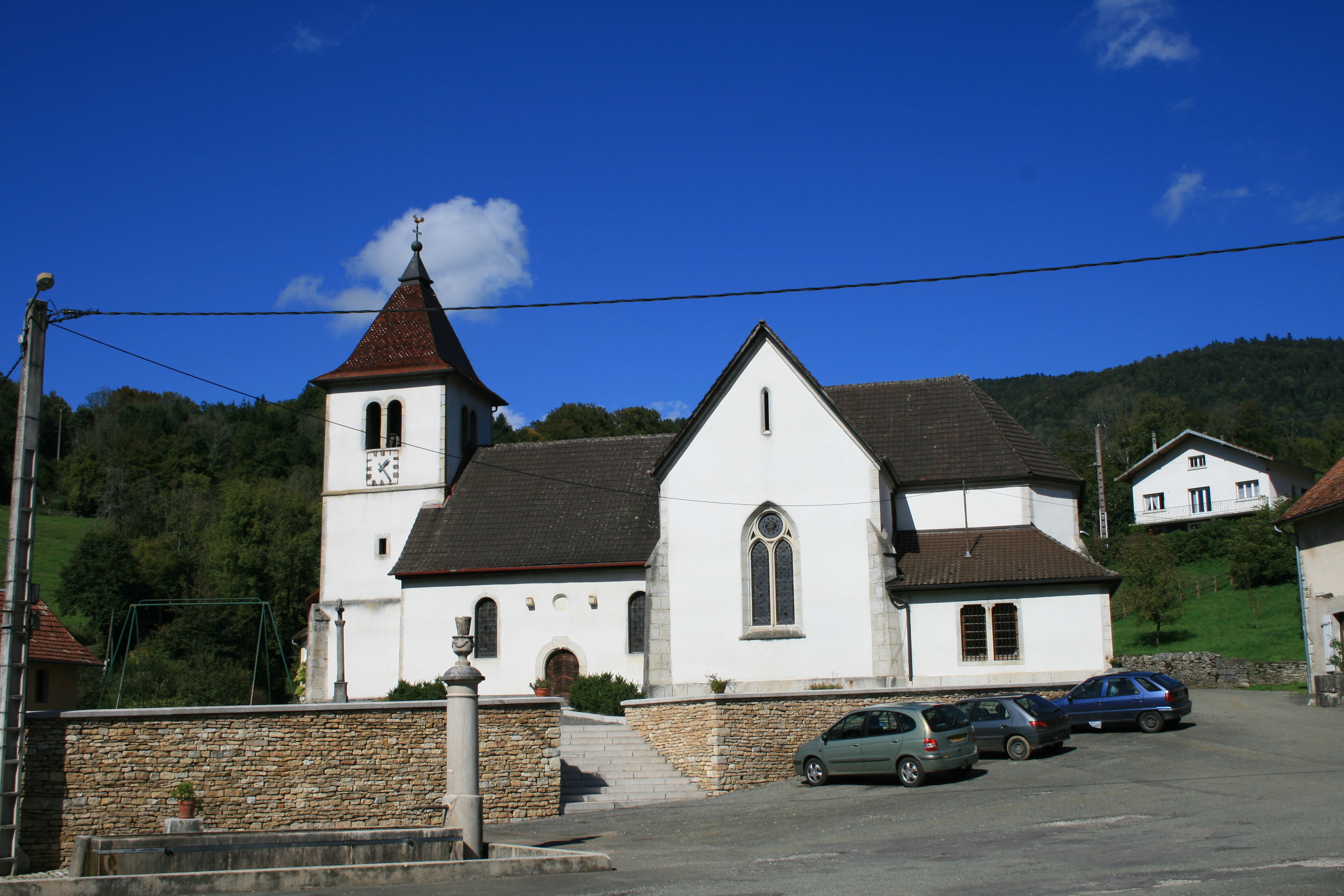
- The church in Glère
- Location of Glère
- Location within France Location within Bourgogne-Franche-Comté
- Coordinates: 47°20′40″N 6°59′42″E
- Country: France
- Region: Bourgogne-Franche-Comté
- Department: Doubs
- Arrondissement: Montbéliard
- Canton: Maîche

Government
  - Mayor (2020–2026): Raphaël Pequignot
- Area^{1}: 15.93 km^{2} (6.15 sq mi)
- Highest elevation: 903 m (2,963 ft)
- Lowest elevation: 404 m (1,325 ft)
- Population (2023): 176
  - Density: 11.0/km^{2} (28.6/sq mi)
- Time zone: UTC+01:00 (CET)
  - Summer (DST): UTC+02:00 (CEST)
- INSEE/Postal code: 25275 /25190
- ^{1} French Land Register data, which excludes lakes, ponds, glaciers > 1 km^{2} (0.386 sq mi or 247 acres) and river estuaries.

Glère (French pronunciation: [ɡlɛʁ]) is a commune in the Doubs department in the Bourgogne-Franche-Comté Region in eastern France.

== Geography ==
Many of the residents work in the agricultural sector, with dairy farming still forming a large part of the local economy. A number of residents also commute to work in factories in nearby Switzerland.

== Population ==
Historical population
Year	Pop.	±% p.a.
1968	216	—
1975	198	−1.24%
1982	181	−1.27%
1990	187	+0.41%
1999	208	+1.19%
2007	208	+0.00%
2012	216	+0.76%
2017	225	+0.82%
2023	176	−4.01%
Source: INSEE

== Sights ==
Glère hosts a 17th-century church, a post office, two restaurants, and a bar. The village, with its location on the tranquil river Doubs, is a perennial favorite with fishermen and campers.

In the early 1990s, Roger Macabrey, a recipient of the croix de guerre for his actions during World War II and a former mayor of Glère, served on the general council of Doubs department, where he promoted initiatives to attract more tourists to the region.

== See also ==
- Communes of the Doubs department
