= Arrondissement of Montbéliard =

Coordinates: 47°31′N 6°48′E

Montbéliard
- Arrondissement
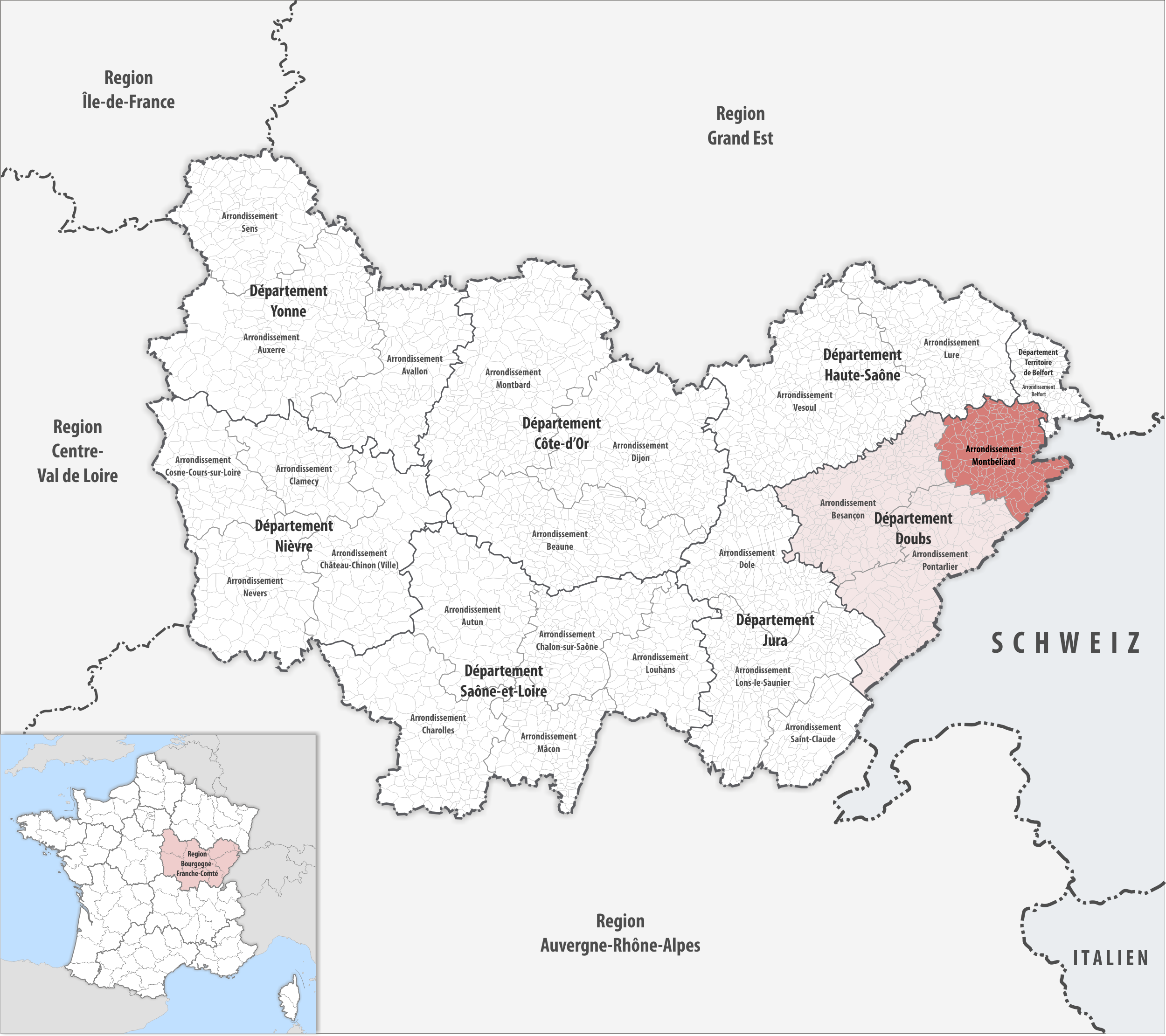
- Location within the region Bourgogne-Franche-Comté
- Country: France
- Region: Bourgogne-Franche-Comté
- Department: Doubs
- No. of communes: {{{nbcomm}}}
- Area: 1,255.7 km^{2} (484.8 sq mi)
- Population (2023): 173,879
  - Density: 138.47/km^{2} (358.64/sq mi)
- INSEE code: 252

The arrondissement of Montbéliard is an arrondissement of France in the Doubs department in the Bourgogne-Franche-Comté region. It has 168 communes. Its population is 175,505 (2021), and its area is 1,255.7 km^{2} (484.8 sq mi).

== Composition ==
The communes of the arrondissement of Montbéliard, and their INSEE codes, are:

1. Abbévillers (25004)
2. Accolans (25005)
3. Aibre (25008)
4. Allenjoie (25011)
5. Allondans (25013)
6. Anteuil (25018)
7. Appenans (25019)
8. Arbouans (25020)
9. Arcey (25022)
10. Audincourt (25031)
11. Autechaux-Roide (25033)
12. Badevel (25040)
13. Bart (25043)
14. Battenans-Varin (25046)
15. Bavans (25048)
16. Belfays (25049)
17. Belleherbe (25051)
18. Belvoir (25053)
19. Berche (25054)
20. Bethoncourt (25057)
21. Beutal (25059)
22. Bief (25061)
23. Blamont (25063)
24. Blussangeaux (25066)
25. Blussans (25067)
26. Bondeval (25071)
27. Bourguignon (25082)
28. Bournois (25083)
29. Branne (25087)
30. Les Bréseux (25091)
31. Bretigney (25093)
32. Brognard (25097)
33. Burnevillers (25102)
34. Cernay-l'Église (25108)
35. Chamesol (25114)
36. Charmauvillers (25124)
37. Charmoille (25125)
38. Charquemont (25127)
39. Chazot (25145)
40. Colombier-Fontaine (25159)
41. Courcelles-lès-Montbéliard (25170)
42. Cour-Saint-Maurice (25173)
43. Courtefontaine (25174)
44. Crosey-le-Grand (25177)
45. Crosey-le-Petit (25178)
46. Dambelin (25187)
47. Dambenois (25188)
48. Dampierre-les-Bois (25190)
49. Dampierre-sur-le-Doubs (25191)
50. Dampjoux (25192)
51. Damprichard (25193)
52. Dannemarie (25194)
53. Dasle (25196)
54. Désandans (25198)
55. Dung (25207)
56. Échenans (25210)
57. Les Écorces (25213)
58. Écot (25214)
59. Écurcey (25216)
60. Étouvans (25224)
61. Étrappe (25226)
62. Étupes (25228)
63. Exincourt (25230)
64. Faimbe (25232)
65. Ferrières-le-Lac (25234)
66. Fesches-le-Châtel (25237)
67. Fessevillers (25238)
68. Feule (25239)
69. Fleurey (25244)
70. Fontaine-lès-Clerval (25246)
71. Fournet-Blancheroche (25255)
72. Frambouhans (25256)
73. Froidevaux (25261)
74. Gémonval (25264)
75. Geney (25266)
76. Glay (25274)
77. Glère (25275)
78. Goumois (25280)
79. Goux-lès-Dambelin (25281)
80. Grand-Charmont (25284)
81. La Grange (25290)
82. Hérimoncourt (25304)
83. L'Hôpital-Saint-Lieffroy (25306)
84. Hyémondans (25311)
85. Indevillers (25314)
86. L'Isle-sur-le-Doubs (25315)
87. Issans (25316)
88. Laire (25322)
89. Lanthenans (25327)
90. Liebvillers (25335)
91. Longevelle-sur-Doubs (25345)
92. Lougres (25350)
93. Maîche (25356)
94. Mancenans (25365)
95. Mancenans-Lizerne (25366)
96. Mandeure (25367)
97. Marvelise (25369)
98. Mathay (25370)
99. Médière (25372)
100. Meslières (25378)
101. Montancy (25386)
102. Montandon (25387)
103. Montbéliard (25388)
104. Mont-de-Vougney (25392)
105. Montécheroux (25393)
106. Montenois (25394)
107. Montjoie-le-Château (25402)
108. Neuchâtel-Urtière (25422)
109. Noirefontaine (25426)
110. Nommay (25428)
111. Onans (25431)
112. Orgeans-Blanchefontaine (25433)
113. Orve (25436)
114. Pays-de-Clerval (25156)
115. Péseux (25449)
116. Pierrefontaine-lès-Blamont (25452)
117. Les Plains-et-Grands-Essarts (25458)
118. Pompierre-sur-Doubs (25461)
119. Pont-de-Roide-Vermondans (25463)
120. Présentevillers (25469)
121. La Prétière (25470)
122. Provenchère (25471)
123. Rahon (25476)
124. Randevillers (25478)
125. Rang (25479)
126. Raynans (25481)
127. Rémondans-Vaivre (25485)
128. Roche-lès-Clerval (25496)
129. Roches-lès-Blamont (25497)
130. Rosières-sur-Barbèche (25503)
131. Sainte-Marie (25523)
132. Sainte-Suzanne (25526)
133. Saint-Georges-Armont (25516)
134. Saint-Hippolyte (25519)
135. Saint-Julien-lès-Montbéliard (25521)
136. Saint-Maurice-Colombier (25524)
137. Sancey (25529)
138. Seloncourt (25539)
139. Semondans (25540)
140. Sochaux (25547)
141. Solemont (25548)
142. Soulce-Cernay (25551)
143. Sourans (25552)
144. Soye (25553)
145. Surmont (25554)
146. Taillecourt (25555)
147. Les Terres-de-Chaux (25138)
148. Thiébouhans (25559)
149. Thulay (25562)
150. Trévillers (25571)
151. Urtière (25573)
152. Valentigney (25580)
153. Valonne (25583)
154. Valoreille (25584)
155. Vandoncourt (25586)
156. Vaucluse (25588)
157. Vauclusotte (25589)
158. Vaufrey (25591)
159. Vellerot-lès-Belvoir (25595)
160. Vellevans (25597)
161. Vernois-lès-Belvoir (25607)
162. Le Vernoy (25608)
163. Vieux-Charmont (25614)
164. Villars-lès-Blamont (25615)
165. Villars-sous-Dampjoux (25617)
166. Villars-sous-Écot (25618)
167. Voujeaucourt (25632)
168. Vyt-lès-Belvoir (25635)

== History ==
The arrondissement of Saint-Hippolyte was created in 1800. The subprefecture was moved to Montbéliard in 1816. In 2009 the canton of Le Russey that previously belonged to the arrondissement of Montbéliard was added to the arrondissement of Pontarlier.

As a result of the reorganisation of the cantons of France which came into effect in 2015, the borders of the cantons are no longer related to the borders of the arrondissements. The cantons of the arrondissement of Montbéliard were, as of January 2015:

1. Audincourt
2. Clerval
3. Étupes
4. Hérimoncourt
5. L'Isle-sur-le-Doubs
6. Maîche
7. Montbéliard-Est
8. Montbéliard-Ouest
9. Pont-de-Roide
10. Saint-Hippolyte
11. Sochaux-Grand-Charmont
12. Valentigney

== Sub-prefects ==
- Robert Miguet 1974-1978 : sub-prefect of Montbéliard
