= Branne, Doubs =

Branne
- Commune
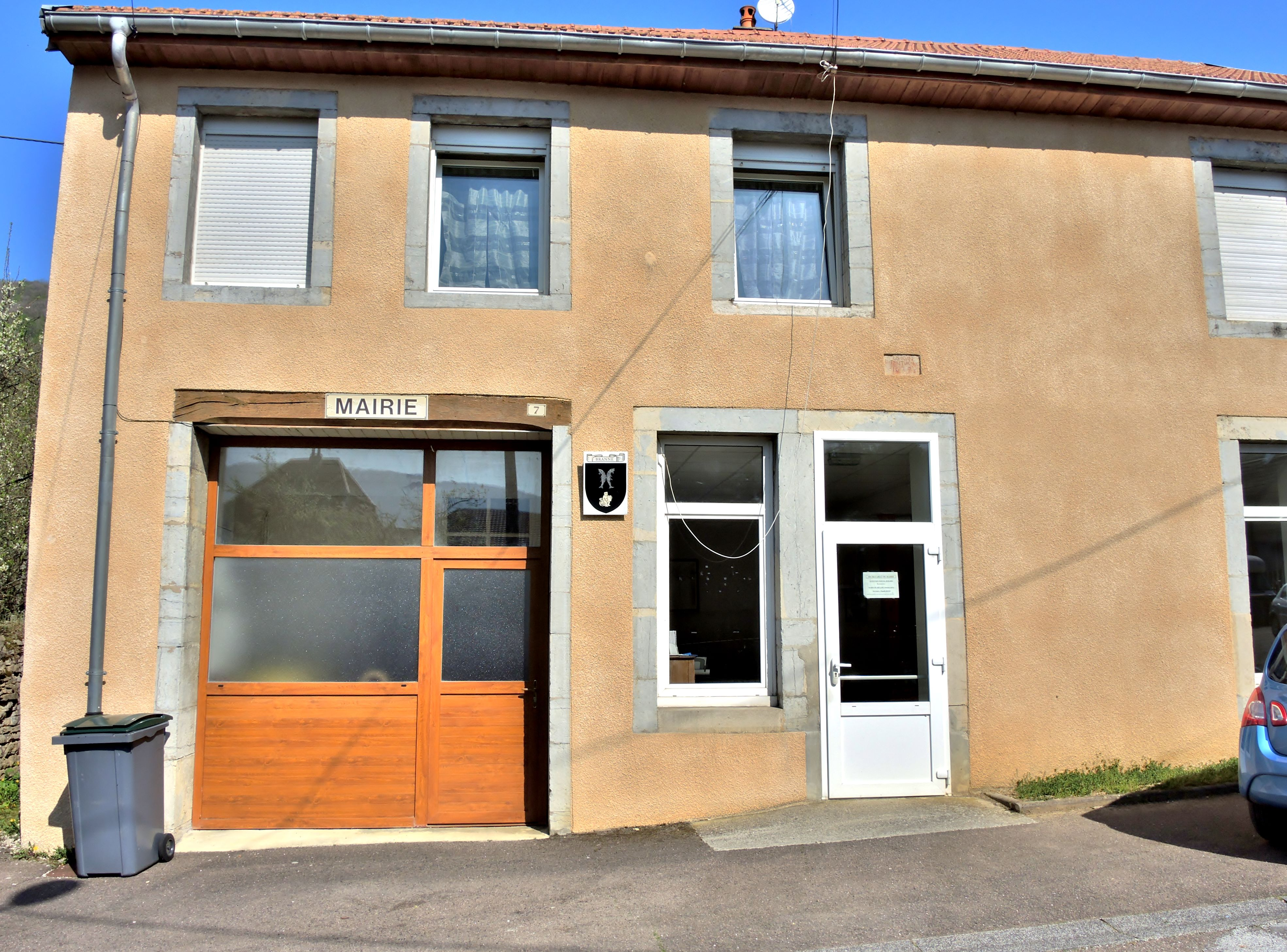
- The town hall in Branne

- Coat of arms
- Location of Branne
- Location within France Location within Bourgogne-Franche-Comté
- Coordinates: 47°22′39″N 6°28′23″E
- Country: France
- Region: Bourgogne-Franche-Comté
- Department: Doubs
- Arrondissement: Montbéliard
- Canton: Bavans

Government
  - Mayor (2021–2026): Frédérique Petitjean
- Area^{1}: 6.45 km^{2} (2.49 sq mi)
- Highest elevation: 556 m (1,824 ft)
- Lowest elevation: 272 m (892 ft)
- Population (2023): 179
  - Density: 27.8/km^{2} (71.9/sq mi)
- Time zone: UTC+01:00 (CET)
  - Summer (DST): UTC+02:00 (CEST)
- INSEE/Postal code: 25087 /25340
- ^{1} French Land Register data, which excludes lakes, ponds, glaciers > 1 km^{2} (0.386 sq mi or 247 acres) and river estuaries.

Branne (French pronunciation: [bʁan]) is a commune in the Doubs department in the Bourgogne-Franche-Comté region in eastern France.

== Climate ==
On average, Branne experiences 69.0 days per year with a minimum temperature below 0 °C (32.0 °F), 2.5 days per year with a minimum temperature below −10 °C (14.0 °F), 7.5 days per year with a maximum temperature below 0 °C (32.0 °F), and 20.0 days per year with a maximum temperature above 30 °C (86.0 °F). The record high temperature was 39.0 °C (102.2 °F) on August 7, 2015, while the record low temperature was −19.8 °C (−3.6 °F) on December 20, 2009.

Climate data for Branne (1991–2020 normals, extremes 2008–present)
Month	Jan	Feb	Mar	Apr	May	Jun	Jul	Aug	Sep	Oct	Nov	Dec	Year
Record high °C (°F)	20.6 (69.1)	22.6 (72.7)	26.4 (79.5)	28.3 (82.9)	32.4 (90.3)	36.6 (97.9)	38.7 (101.7)	39.0 (102.2)	33.5 (92.3)	30.9 (87.6)	24.9 (76.8)	19.6 (67.3)	39.0 (102.2)
Mean daily maximum °C (°F)	5.7 (42.3)	7.6 (45.7)	12.1 (53.8)	17.0 (62.6)	20.1 (68.2)	24.3 (75.7)	26.6 (79.9)	26.2 (79.2)	21.9 (71.4)	16.4 (61.5)	10.9 (51.6)	7.0 (44.6)	16.3 (61.4)
Daily mean °C (°F)	2.5 (36.5)	3.4 (38.1)	6.8 (44.2)	10.7 (51.3)	14.1 (57.4)	18.1 (64.6)	20.0 (68.0)	19.6 (67.3)	16.0 (60.8)	11.6 (52.9)	7.0 (44.6)	3.6 (38.5)	11.1 (52.0)
Mean daily minimum °C (°F)	−0.7 (30.7)	−0.8 (30.6)	1.4 (34.5)	4.3 (39.7)	8.1 (46.6)	12.0 (53.6)	13.4 (56.1)	13.1 (55.6)	10.0 (50.0)	6.7 (44.1)	3.2 (37.8)	0.2 (32.4)	5.9 (42.6)
Record low °C (°F)	−12.8 (9.0)	−15.9 (3.4)	−6.9 (19.6)	−5.2 (22.6)	−1.1 (30.0)	4.2 (39.6)	5.5 (41.9)	4.9 (40.8)	1.9 (35.4)	−4.2 (24.4)	−11.7 (10.9)	−19.8 (−3.6)	−19.8 (−3.6)
Average precipitation mm (inches)	92.6 (3.65)	78.4 (3.09)	78.7 (3.10)	79.6 (3.13)	106.2 (4.18)	109.3 (4.30)	90.9 (3.58)	93.8 (3.69)	77.7 (3.06)	103.9 (4.09)	95.2 (3.75)	120.7 (4.75)	1,127 (44.37)
Average precipitation days (≥ 1.0 mm)	12.6	11.2	11.0	10.0	12.9	11.2	9.8	10.4	8.3	11.7	12.1	15.2	136.4
Source: Meteociel

== Population ==
Historical population
Year	Pop.	±% p.a.
1968	131	—
1975	140	+0.95%
1982	159	+1.83%
1990	171	+0.91%
1999	167	−0.26%
2007	174	+0.51%
2012	177	+0.34%
2017	175	−0.23%
2023	179	+0.38%
Source: INSEE

== See also ==
- Communes of the Doubs department
