= Surmont =

- Commune
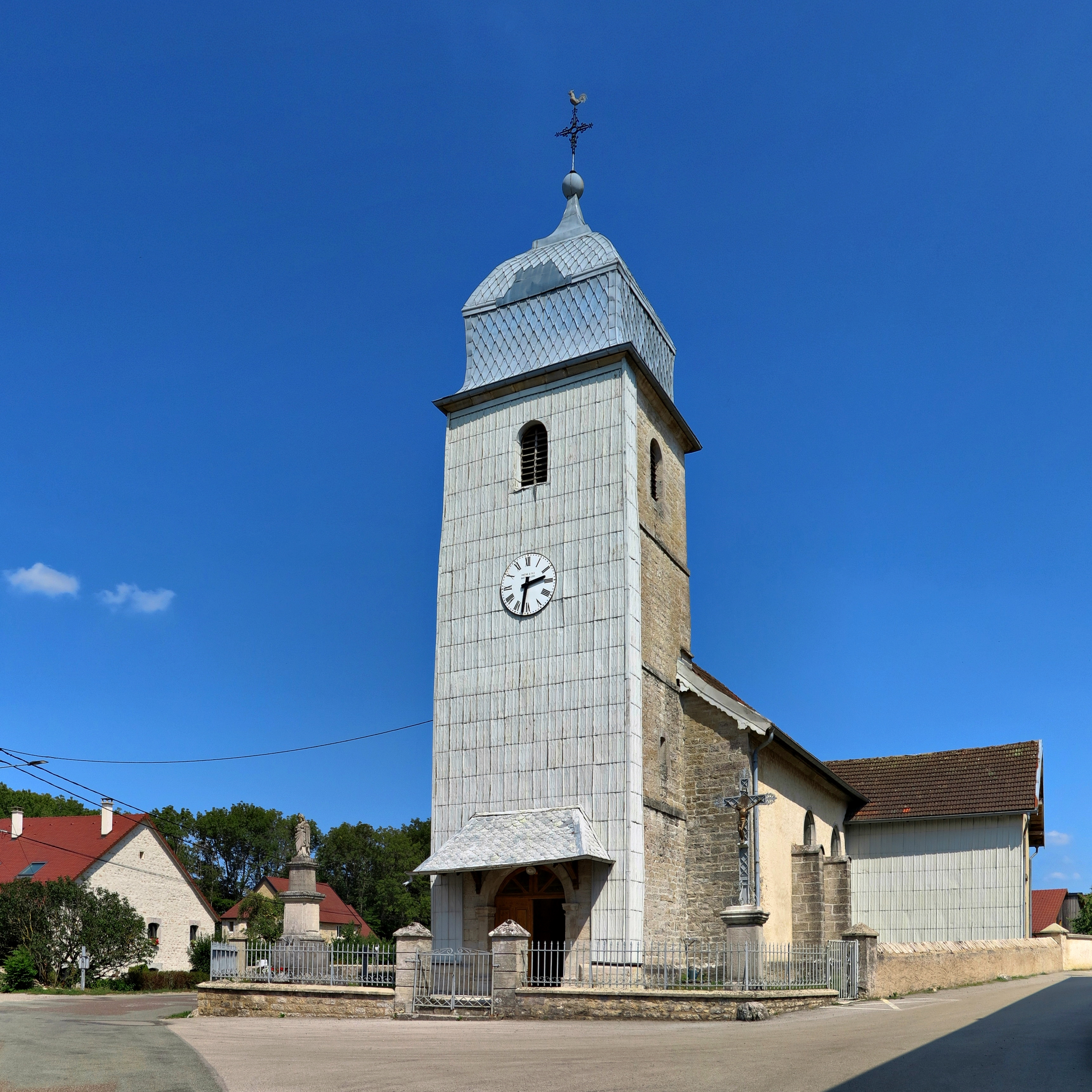
- The church in Surmont
- Location of Surmont
- Location within France Location within Bourgogne-Franche-Comté
- Coordinates: 47°16′46″N 6°36′42″E
- Country: France
- Region: Bourgogne-Franche-Comté
- Department: Doubs
- Arrondissement: Montbéliard
- Canton: Bavans

Government
  - Mayor (2020–2026): Denis Boiteux
- Area^{1}: 7.38 km^{2} (2.85 sq mi)
- Highest elevation: 793 m (2,602 ft)
- Lowest elevation: 600 m (2,000 ft)
- Population (2023): 127
  - Density: 17.2/km^{2} (44.6/sq mi)
- Time zone: UTC+01:00 (CET)
  - Summer (DST): UTC+02:00 (CEST)
- INSEE/Postal code: 25554 /25380
- ^{1} French Land Register data, which excludes lakes, ponds, glaciers > 1 km^{2} (0.386 sq mi or 247 acres) and river estuaries.

Surmont (French pronunciation: [syʁmɔ̃]) is a commune in the Doubs department in the Bourgogne-Franche-Comté region in eastern France.

== Geography ==
Surmont lies 22 km (14 mi) southeast of Clerval on the plateau of Belleherbe above the caves of the Baume.

== Population ==
Historical population
Year	Pop.	±% p.a.
1968	132	—
1975	121	−1.24%
1982	125	+0.47%
1990	128	+0.30%
1999	129	+0.09%
2007	129	+0.00%
2012	129	+0.00%
2017	121	−1.27%
2023	127	+0.81%
Source: INSEE

== See also ==
- Communes of the Doubs department
