= La Grange, Doubs =

La Grange
- Commune
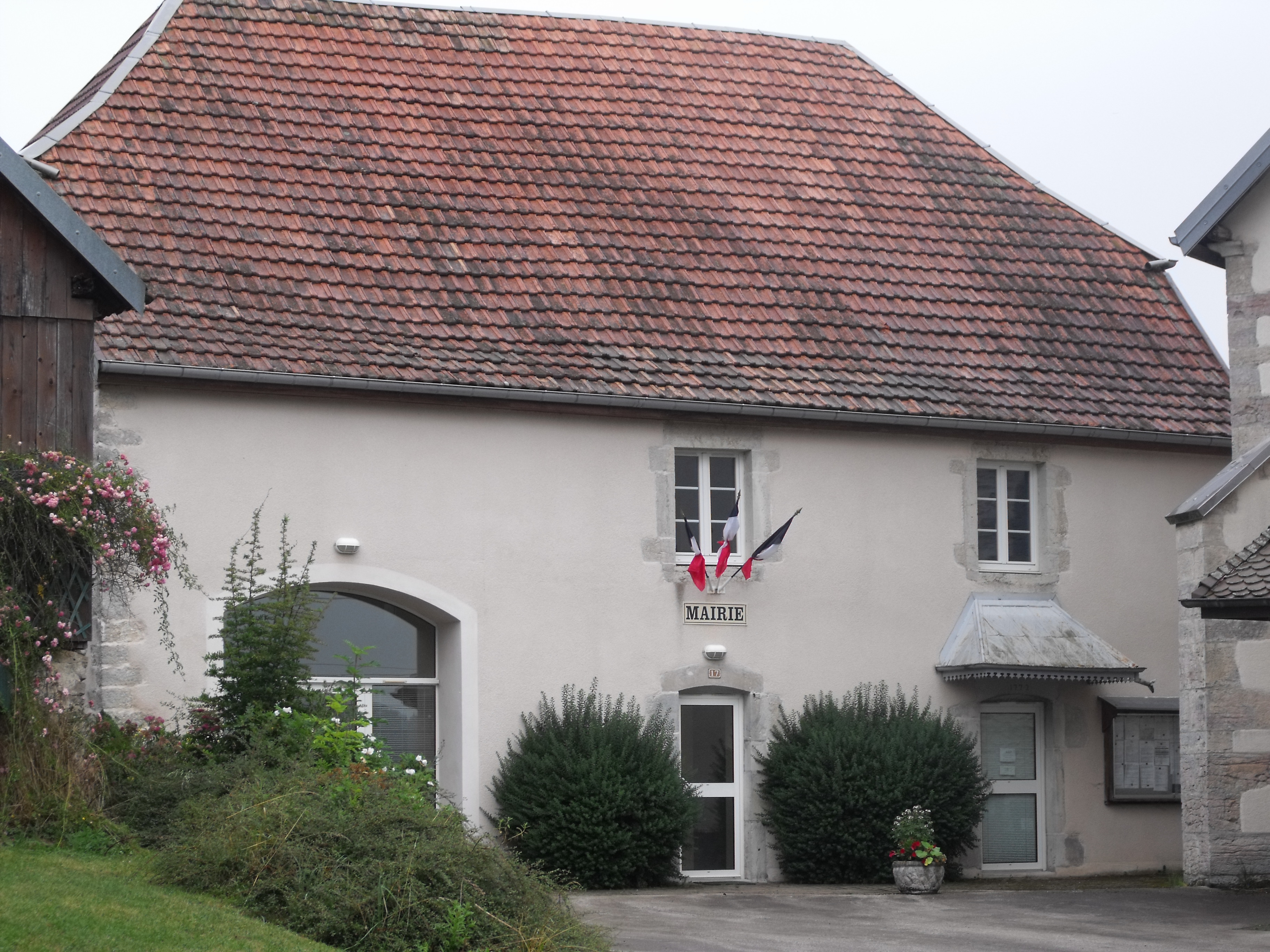
- The town hall in La Grange

- Coat of arms
- Location of La Grange
- Location within France Location within Bourgogne-Franche-Comté
- Coordinates: 47°16′52″N 6°39′55″E
- Country: France
- Region: Bourgogne-Franche-Comté
- Department: Doubs
- Arrondissement: Montbéliard
- Canton: Valdahon

Government
  - Mayor (2020–2026): Régis Denizot
- Area^{1}: 6.16 km^{2} (2.38 sq mi)
- Highest elevation: 843 m (2,766 ft)
- Lowest elevation: 670 m (2,200 ft)
- Population (2023): 97
  - Density: 16/km^{2} (41/sq mi)
- Time zone: UTC+01:00 (CET)
  - Summer (DST): UTC+02:00 (CEST)
- INSEE/Postal code: 25290 /25380
- ^{1} French Land Register data, which excludes lakes, ponds, glaciers > 1 km^{2} (0.386 sq mi or 247 acres) and river estuaries.

La Grange (French pronunciation: [la ɡʁɑ̃ʒ]) is a commune in the Doubs department in the Bourgogne-Franche-Comté region in eastern France.

== Population ==
Historical population
Year	Pop.	±% p.a.
1968	78	—
1975	76	−0.37%
1982	68	−1.58%
1990	66	−0.37%
1999	75	+1.43%
2007	78	+0.49%
2012	90	+2.90%
2017	94	+0.87%
2023	97	+0.52%
Source: INSEE

== See also ==
- Communes of the Doubs department
