= Roche-lès-Clerval =

- Commune
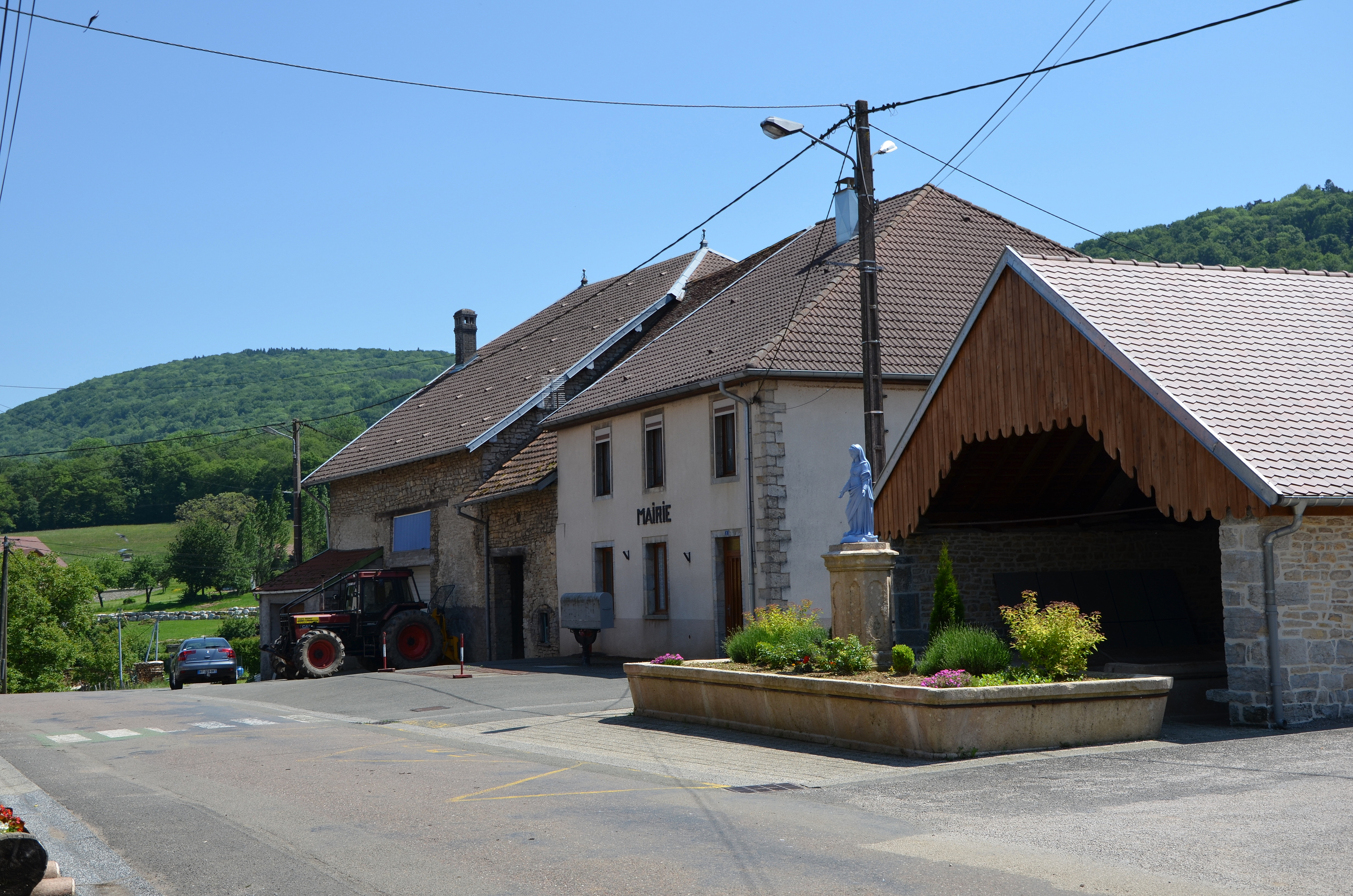
- Town hall

- Coat of arms
- Location of Roche-lès-Clerval
- Location within France Location within Bourgogne-Franche-Comté
- Coordinates: 47°22′06″N 6°28′55″E
- Country: France
- Region: Bourgogne-Franche-Comté
- Department: Doubs
- Arrondissement: Montbéliard
- Canton: Bavans

Government
  - Mayor (2020–2026): Marc Farine
- Area^{1}: 5.34 km^{2} (2.06 sq mi)
- Highest elevation: 558 m (1,831 ft)
- Lowest elevation: 272 m (892 ft)
- Population (2023): 98
  - Density: 18/km^{2} (48/sq mi)
- Time zone: UTC+01:00 (CET)
  - Summer (DST): UTC+02:00 (CEST)
- INSEE/Postal code: 25496 /25340
- ^{1} French Land Register data, which excludes lakes, ponds, glaciers > 1 km^{2} (0.386 sq mi or 247 acres) and river estuaries.

Roche-lès-Clerval (French pronunciation: [ʁɔʃ lɛ klɛʁval], literally Roche near Clerval) is a commune in the Doubs department in the Bourgogne-Franche-Comté region in eastern France.

== Geography ==
The commune lies 4 km (2.5 mi) south of Clerval at the foot of the Lomont peak on the bank of the Doubs.

== Population ==
Historical population
| Year | Pop. | ±% p.a. |
|---|---|---|
| 1968 | 107 | — |
| 1975 | 99 | −1.10% |
| 1982 | 87 | −1.83% |
| 1990 | 93 | +0.84% |
| 1999 | 93 | +0.00% |
| 2007 | 96 | +0.40% |
| 2012 | 115 | +3.68% |
| 2017 | 110 | −0.89% |
| 2023 | 98 | −1.91% |
Source: INSEE

== See also ==
- Clerval
- Communes of the Doubs department
