= Indevillers =

- Commune
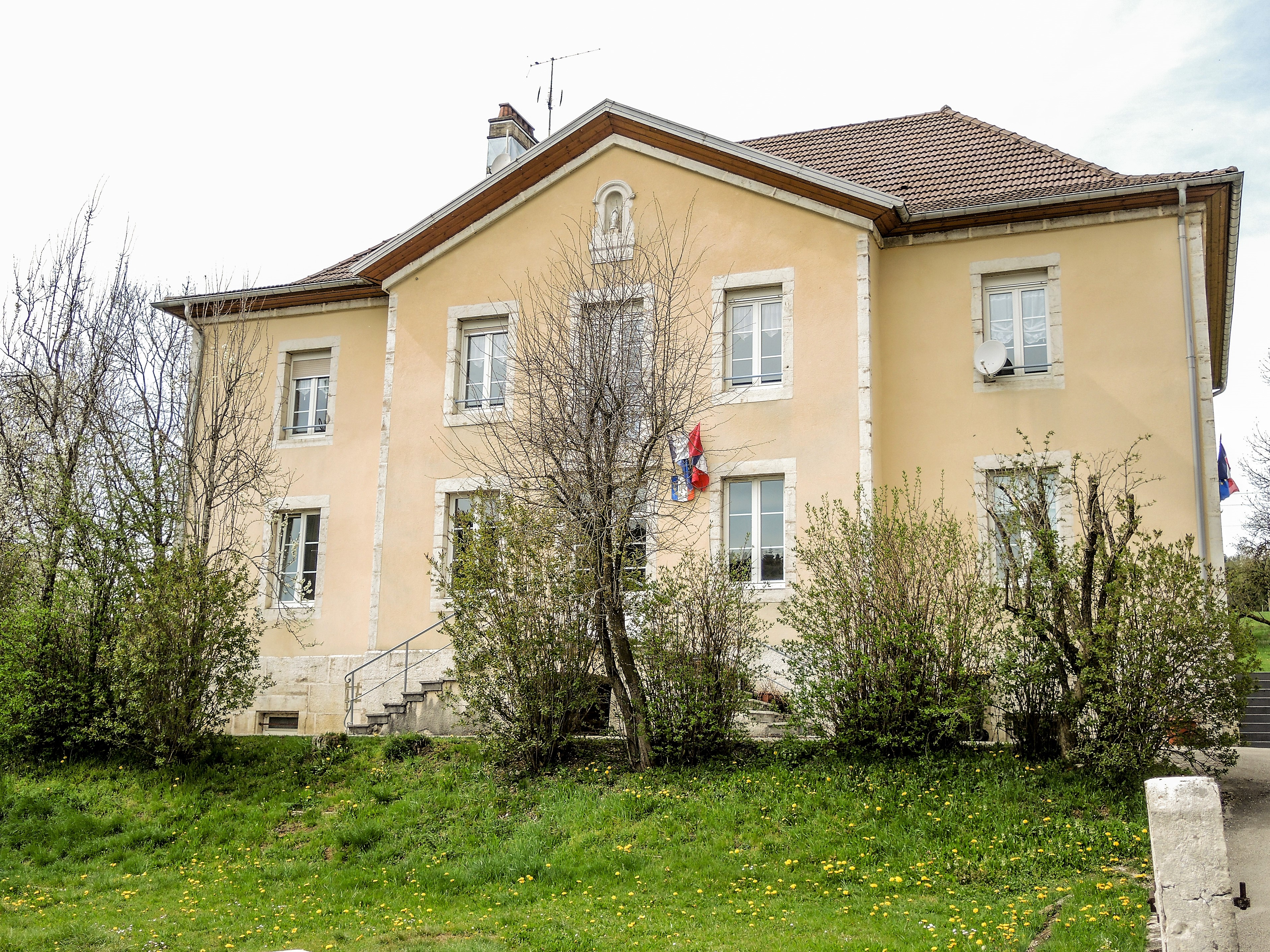
- The town hall in Indevillers
- Location of Indevillers
- Location within France Location within Bourgogne-Franche-Comté
- Coordinates: 47°18′48″N 6°57′27″E
- Country: France
- Region: Bourgogne-Franche-Comté
- Department: Doubs
- Arrondissement: Montbéliard
- Canton: Maîche

Government
  - Mayor (2020–2026): Guy Arguedas
- Area^{1}: 22.81 km^{2} (8.81 sq mi)
- Highest elevation: 922 m (3,025 ft)
- Lowest elevation: 473 m (1,552 ft)
- Population (2023): 236
  - Density: 10.3/km^{2} (26.8/sq mi)
- Time zone: UTC+01:00 (CET)
  - Summer (DST): UTC+02:00 (CEST)
- INSEE/Postal code: 25314 /25470
- ^{1} French Land Register data, which excludes lakes, ponds, glaciers > 1 km^{2} (0.386 sq mi or 247 acres) and river estuaries.

Indevillers is a commune in the Doubs department in the Bourgogne-Franche-Comté region in eastern France.

== Population ==
Historical population
Year	Pop.	±% p.a.
1968	304	—
1975	242	−3.21%
1982	225	−1.04%
1990	195	−1.77%
1999	196	+0.06%
2007	225	+1.74%
2012	242	+1.47%
2017	262	+1.60%
2023	236	−1.73%
Source: INSEE

== See also ==
- Communes of the Doubs department
