= Soulce-Cernay =

- Commune
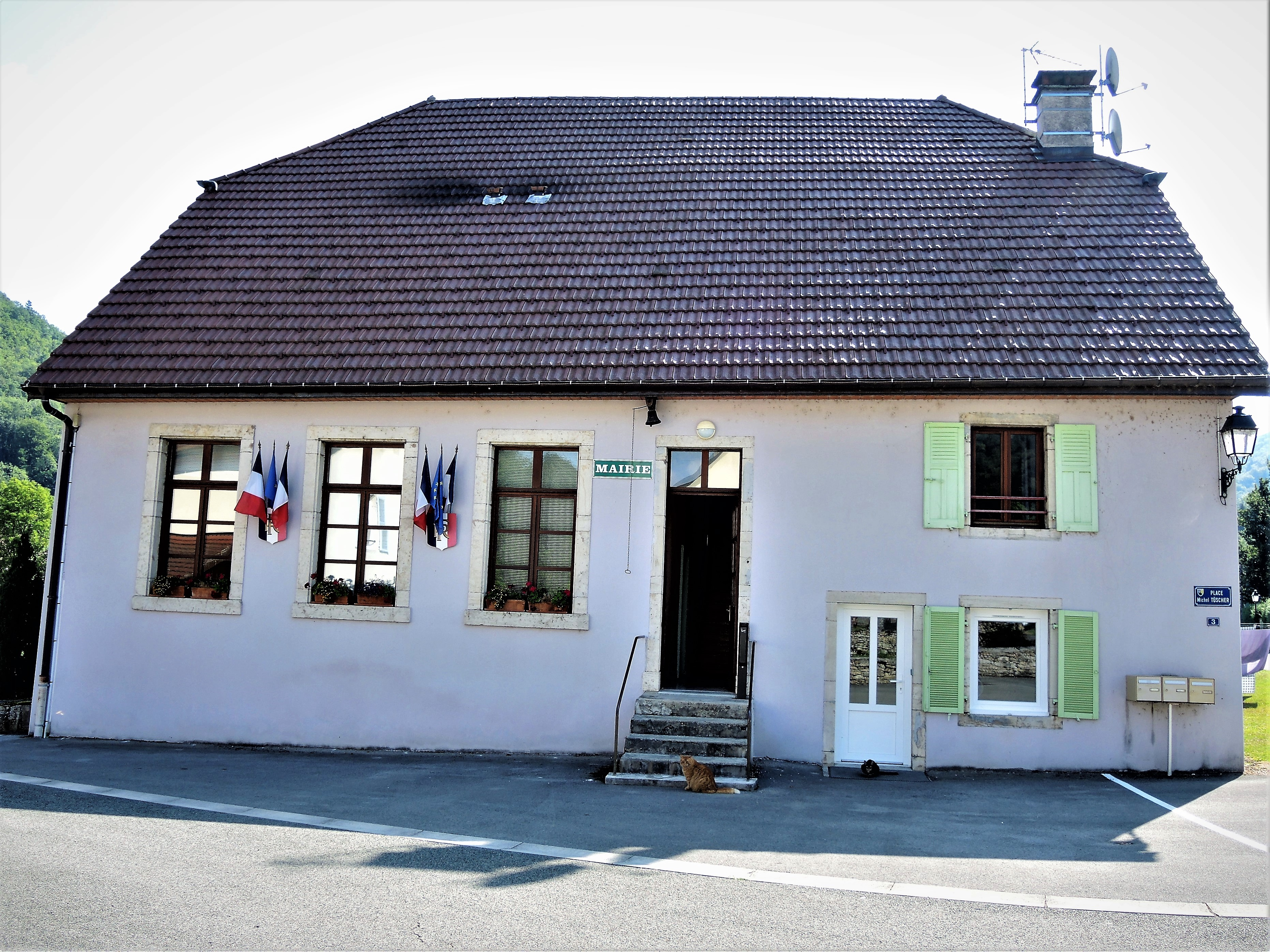
- The town hall in Soulce-Cernay.

- Coat of arms
- Location of Soulce-Cernay
- Location within France Location within Bourgogne-Franche-Comté
- Coordinates: 47°19′33″N 6°51′33″E
- Country: France
- Region: Bourgogne-Franche-Comté
- Department: Doubs
- Arrondissement: Montbéliard
- Canton: Maîche

Government
  - Mayor (2025–2026): Christian Mauvais
- Area^{1}: 8.55 km^{2} (3.30 sq mi)
- Highest elevation: 850 m (2,790 ft)
- Lowest elevation: 377 m (1,237 ft)
- Population (2023): 136
  - Density: 15.9/km^{2} (41.2/sq mi)
- Time zone: UTC+01:00 (CET)
  - Summer (DST): UTC+02:00 (CEST)
- INSEE/Postal code: 25551 /25190
- ^{1} French Land Register data, which excludes lakes, ponds, glaciers > 1 km^{2} (0.386 sq mi or 247 acres) and river estuaries.

Soulce-Cernay (French pronunciation: [suls sɛʁnɛ]) is a commune in the Doubs department' in the Bourgogne-Franche-Comté region in eastern France.

== Geography ==
The commune lies 10 km (6.2 mi) from the Swiss border.

== Population ==
Historical population
Year	Pop.	±% p.a.
1968	89	—
1975	73	−2.79%
1982	58	−3.23%
1990	71	+2.56%
1999	94	+3.17%
2007	105	+1.39%
2012	118	+2.36%
2017	127	+1.48%
2023	136	+1.15%
Source: INSEE

== Sights ==
- Jardin Paléobotanique

== See also ==
- Communes of the Doubs department
