= Rosières-sur-Barbèche =

- Commune
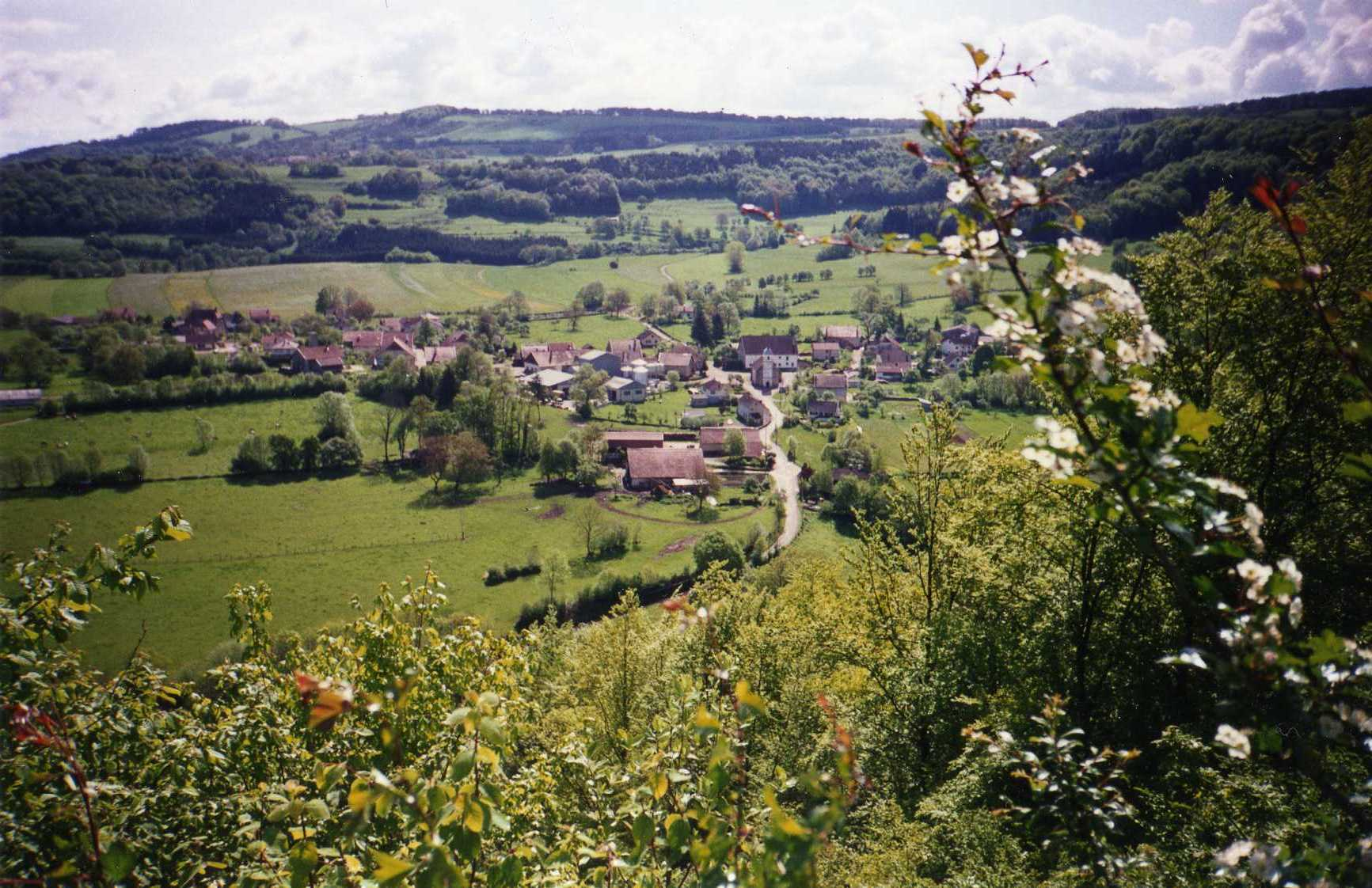
- A general view of Rosières-sur-Barbèche
- Location of Rosières-sur-Barbèche
- Location within France Location within Bourgogne-Franche-Comté
- Coordinates: 47°18′58″N 6°39′36″E
- Country: France
- Region: Bourgogne-Franche-Comté
- Department: Doubs
- Arrondissement: Montbéliard
- Canton: Valdahon

Government
  - Mayor (2020–2026): Paul Meillet
- Area^{1}: 5.31 km^{2} (2.05 sq mi)
- Highest elevation: 790 m (2,590 ft)
- Lowest elevation: 470 m (1,540 ft)
- Population (2023): 108
  - Density: 20.3/km^{2} (52.7/sq mi)
- Time zone: UTC+01:00 (CET)
  - Summer (DST): UTC+02:00 (CEST)
- INSEE/Postal code: 25503 /25190
- ^{1} French Land Register data, which excludes lakes, ponds, glaciers > 1 km^{2} (0.386 sq mi or 247 acres) and river estuaries.

Rosières-sur-Barbèche (French pronunciation: [ʁozjɛʁ syʁ baʁbɛʃ]) is a commune in the Doubs département in the Bourgogne-Franche-Comté region in eastern France.

== Geography ==
The commune lies 15 km (9.3 mi) southwest of Pont-de-Roide.

== Population ==
Historical population
Year	Pop.	±% p.a.
1968	142	—
1975	144	+0.20%
1982	157	+1.24%
1990	137	−1.69%
1999	117	−1.74%
2007	103	−1.58%
2012	104	+0.19%
2017	122	+3.24%
2023	108	−2.01%
Source: INSEE

== See also ==
- Communes of the Doubs department
