= Vaucluse, Doubs =

Vaucluse
- Commune
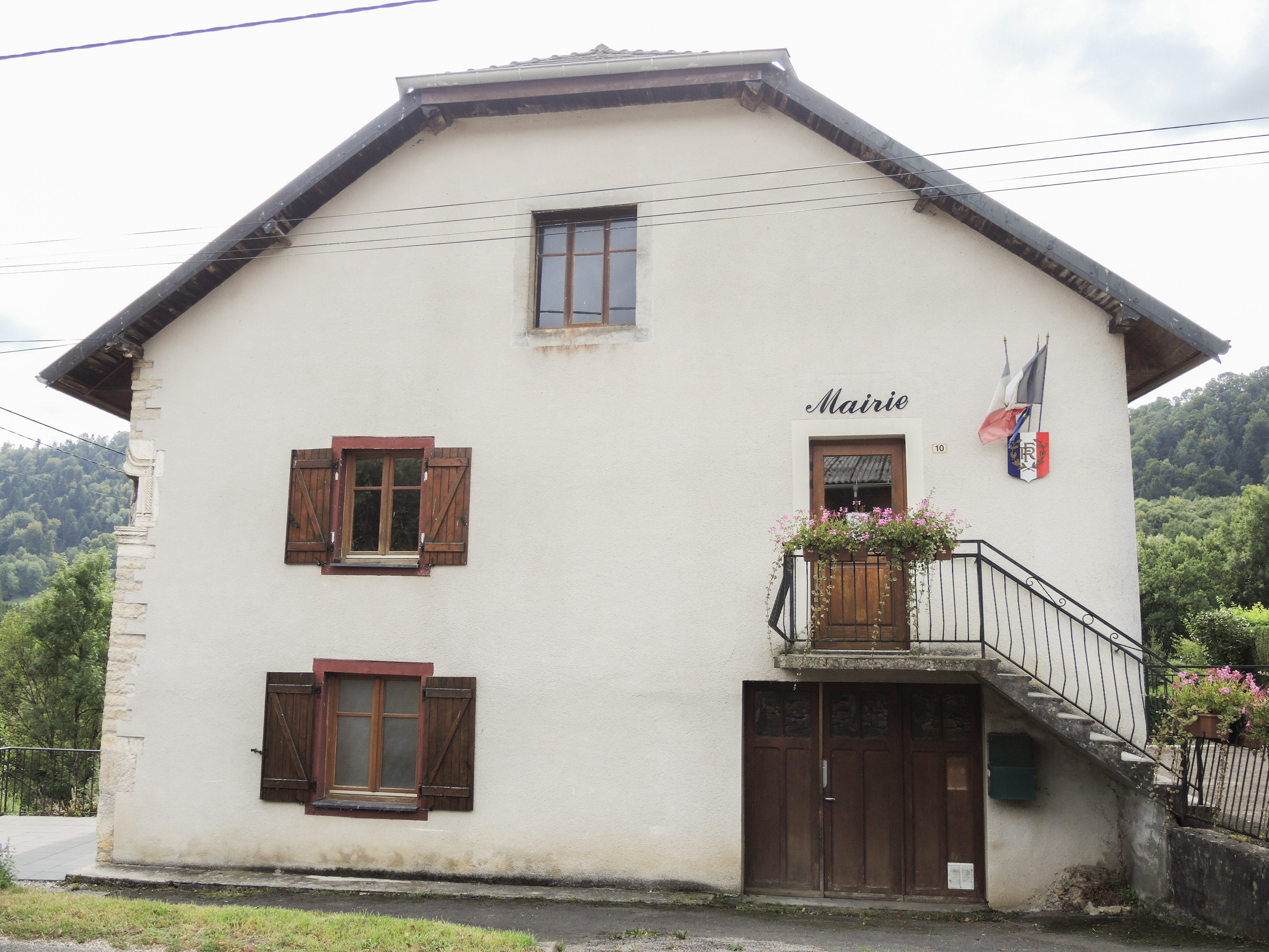
- The town hall in Vaucluse
- Location of Vaucluse
- Location within France Location within Bourgogne-Franche-Comté
- Coordinates: 47°15′33″N 6°41′16″E
- Country: France
- Region: Bourgogne-Franche-Comté
- Department: Doubs
- Arrondissement: Montbéliard
- Canton: Valdahon

Government
  - Mayor (2020–2026): Aurore Gosso
- Area^{1}: 5.01 km^{2} (1.93 sq mi)
- Elevation: 500 m (1,600 ft)
- Highest elevation: 704 m (2,310 ft)
- Lowest elevation: 416 m (1,365 ft)
- Population (2023): 115
  - Density: 23.0/km^{2} (59.5/sq mi)
- Time zone: UTC+01:00 (CET)
  - Summer (DST): UTC+02:00 (CEST)
- INSEE/Postal code: 25588 /25380
- ^{1} French Land Register data, which excludes lakes, ponds, glaciers > 1 km^{2} (0.386 sq mi or 247 acres) and river estuaries.

Vaucluse (French pronunciation: [voklyz]) is a commune in the Doubs department in the Bourgogne-Franche-Comté region in eastern France.

== Geography ==
Vaucluse lies 11 km (6.8 mi) from Maîche. It is mountainous, with the valley of the Dessoubre on the east.

== Population ==
Historical population
Year	Pop.	±% p.a.
1968	87	—
1975	93	+0.96%
1982	71	−3.78%
1990	70	−0.18%
1999	69	−0.16%
2007	103	+5.14%
2012	114	+2.05%
2017	120	+1.03%
2023	115	−0.71%
Source: INSEE

== See also ==
- Communes of the Doubs department
