= Colombier-Fontaine =

- Commune
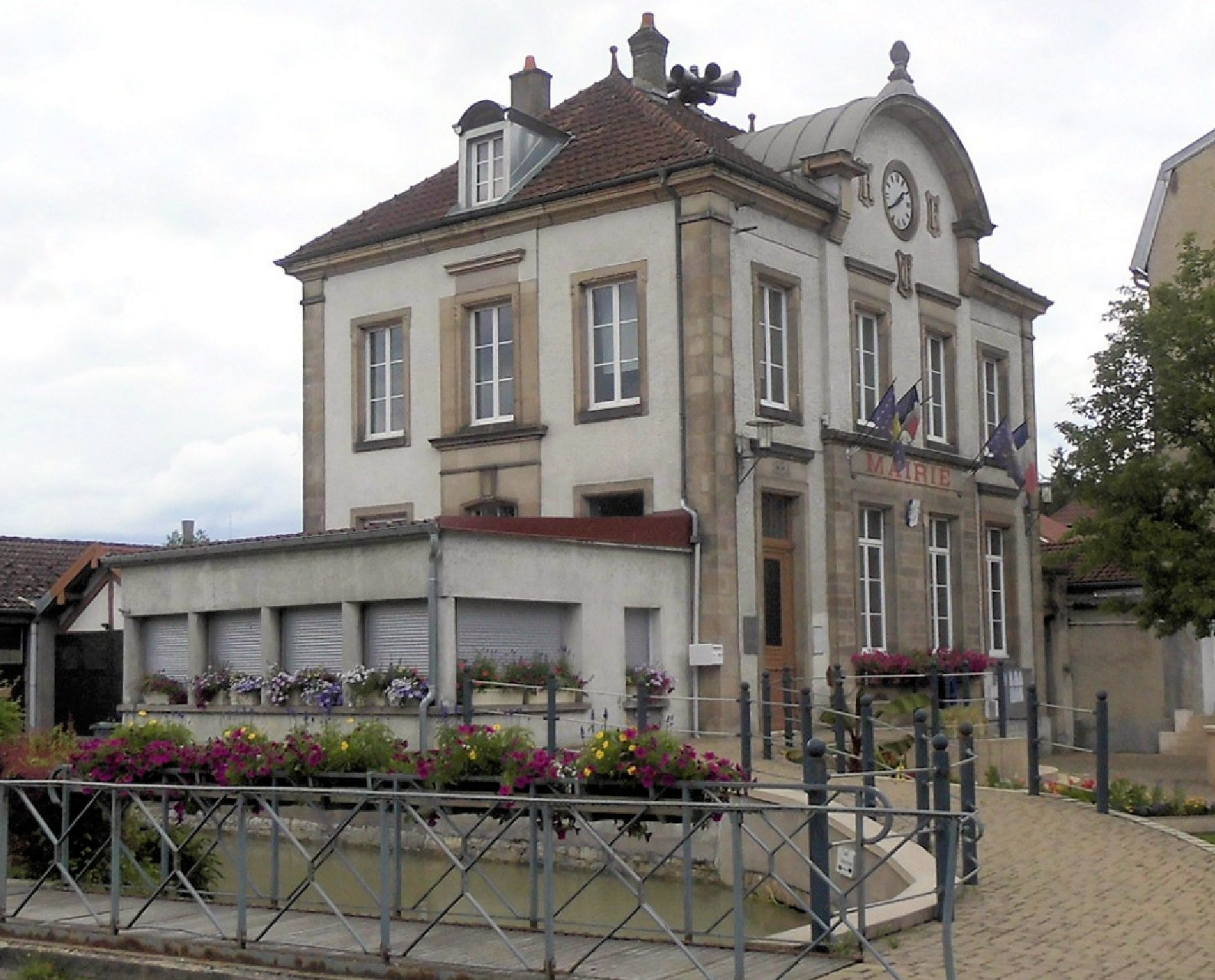
- The town hall in Colombier-Fontaine

- Coat of arms
- Location of Colombier-Fontaine
- Location within France Location within Bourgogne-Franche-Comté
- Coordinates: 47°27′12″N 6°41′25″E
- Country: France
- Region: Bourgogne-Franche-Comté
- Department: Doubs
- Arrondissement: Montbéliard
- Canton: Bavans
- Intercommunality: Pays de Montbéliard Agglomération

Government
  - Mayor (2024–2026): Sylvette Faivre
- Area^{1}: 7.66 km^{2} (2.96 sq mi)
- Highest elevation: 474 m (1,555 ft)
- Lowest elevation: 298 m (978 ft)
- Population (2023): 1,232
  - Density: 161/km^{2} (417/sq mi)
- Time zone: UTC+01:00 (CET)
  - Summer (DST): UTC+02:00 (CEST)
- INSEE/Postal code: 25159 /25260
- ^{1} French Land Register data, which excludes lakes, ponds, glaciers > 1 km^{2} (0.386 sq mi or 247 acres) and river estuaries.

Colombier-Fontaine (French pronunciation: [kɔlɔ̃bje fɔ̃tɛn]) is a commune in the Doubs department in the Bourgogne-Franche-Comté region in eastern France.

== Population ==
Historical population
Year	Pop.	±% p.a.
1968	1,236	—
1975	1,371	+1.49%
1982	1,370	−0.01%
1990	1,523	+1.33%
1999	1,482	−0.30%
2007	1,415	−0.58%
2012	1,365	−0.72%
2017	1,267	−1.48%
2023	1,232	−0.47%
Source: INSEE

== See also ==
- Communes of the Doubs department
