= Charmoille, Doubs =

Charmoille
- Commune
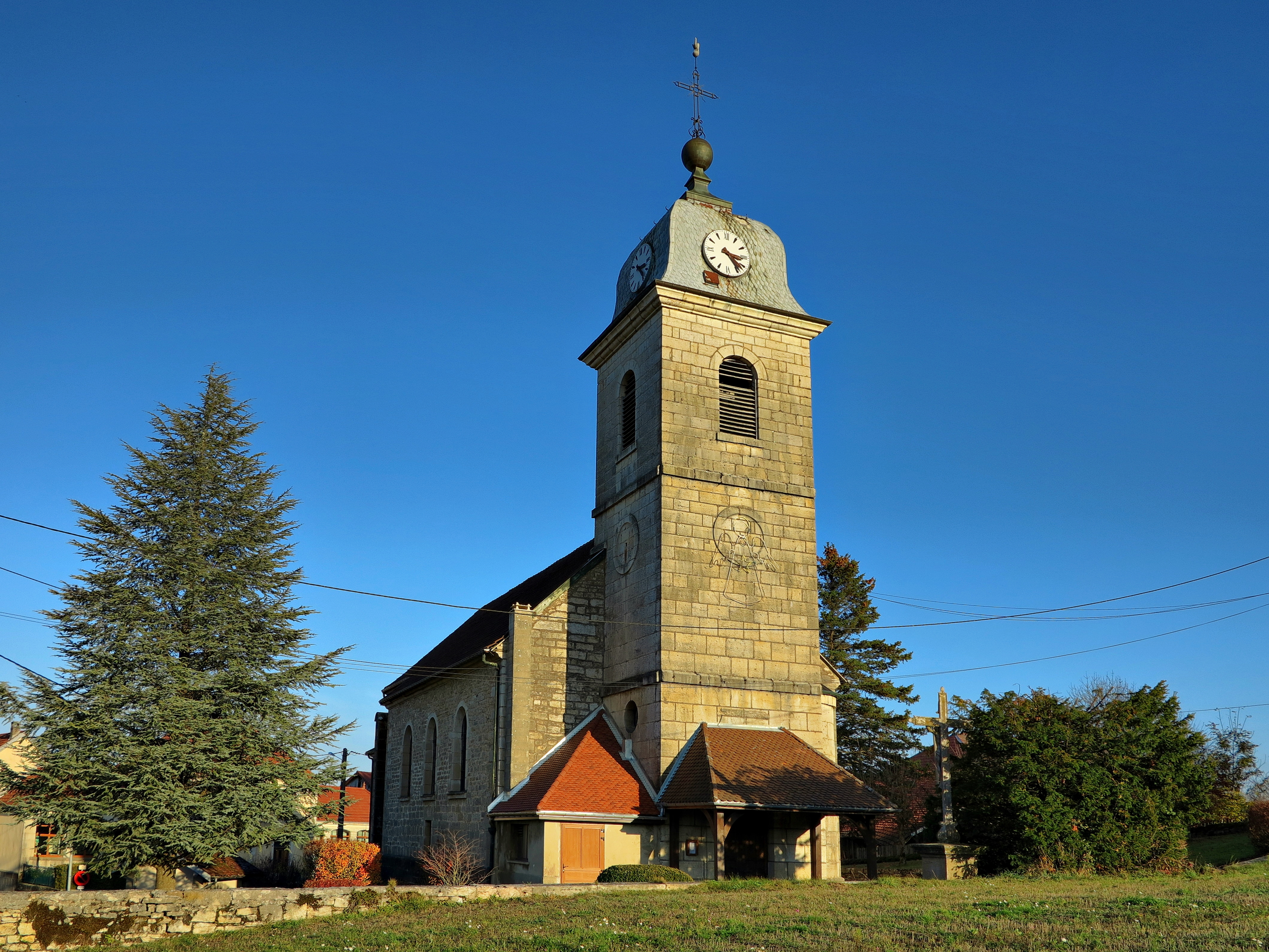
- The church in Charmoille

- Coat of arms
- Location of Charmoille
- Location within France Location within Bourgogne-Franche-Comté
- Coordinates: 47°14′47″N 6°40′18″E
- Country: France
- Region: Bourgogne-Franche-Comté
- Department: Doubs
- Arrondissement: Montbéliard
- Canton: Valdahon

Government
  - Mayor (2023–2026): Bernard Graizely
- Area^{1}: 10.14 km^{2} (3.92 sq mi)
- Highest elevation: 852 m (2,795 ft)
- Lowest elevation: 460 m (1,510 ft)
- Population (2023): 317
  - Density: 31.3/km^{2} (81.0/sq mi)
- Time zone: UTC+01:00 (CET)
  - Summer (DST): UTC+02:00 (CEST)
- INSEE/Postal code: 25125 /25380
- ^{1} French Land Register data, which excludes lakes, ponds, glaciers > 1 km^{2} (0.386 sq mi or 247 acres) and river estuaries.

Charmoille (French pronunciation: [ʃaʁmwaj]) is a commune in Doubs, a department in the Bourgogne-Franche-Comté region in eastern France.

== Population ==
Historical population
Year	Pop.	±% p.a.
1968	356	—
1975	326	−1.25%
1982	316	−0.44%
1990	298	−0.73%
1999	297	−0.04%
2007	303	+0.25%
2012	318	+0.97%
2017	330	+0.74%
2023	317	−0.67%
Source: INSEE

== See also ==
- Communes of the Doubs department
