= Belvoir, Doubs =

Belvoir
- Commune
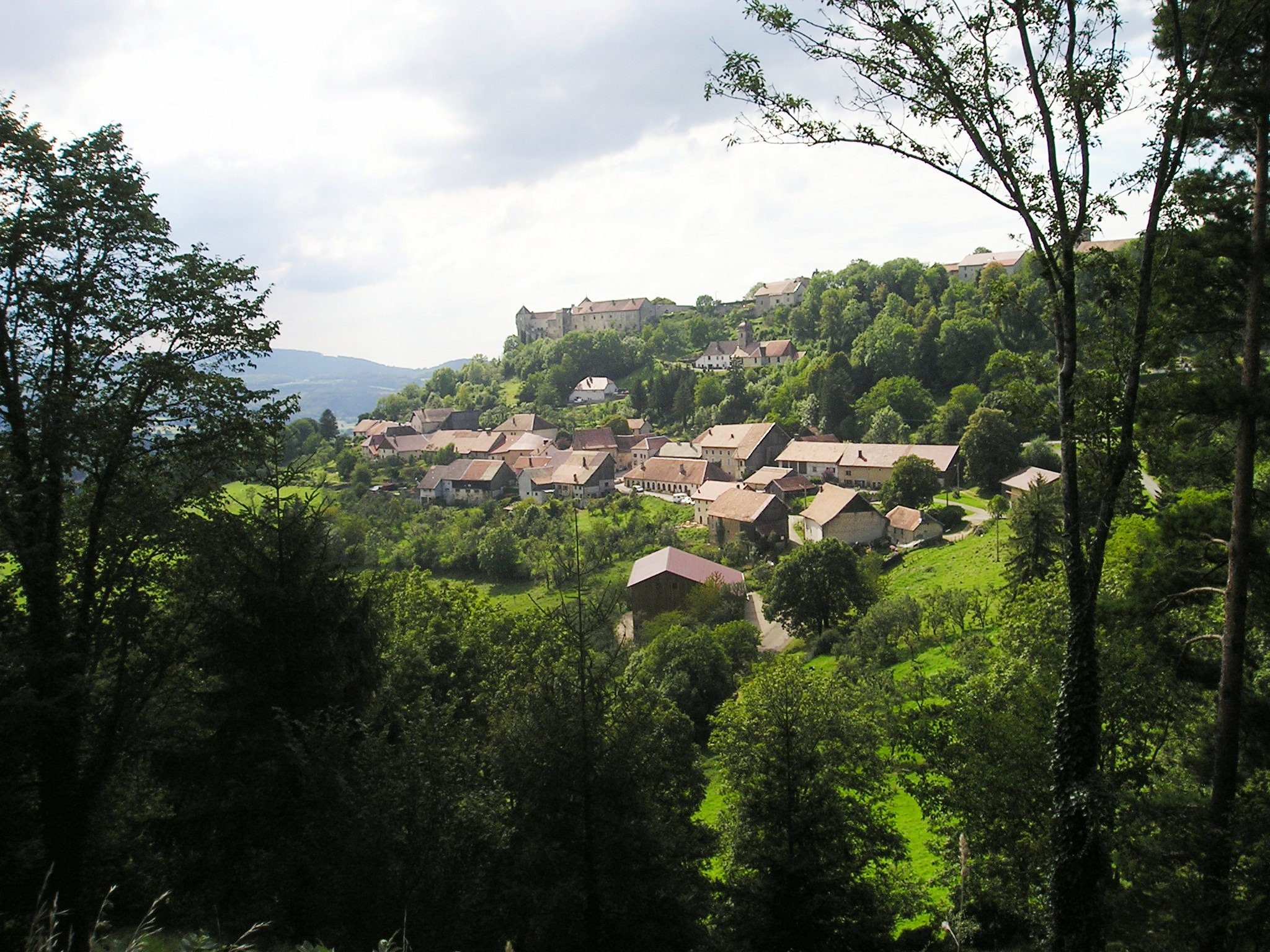
- A general view of Belvoir

- Coat of arms
- Location of Belvoir
- Location within France Location within Bourgogne-Franche-Comté
- Coordinates: 47°19′06″N 6°36′15″E
- Country: France
- Region: Bourgogne-Franche-Comté
- Department: Doubs
- Arrondissement: Montbéliard
- Canton: Bavans

Government
  - Mayor (2020–2026): Christian Brand
- Area^{1}: 9.31 km^{2} (3.59 sq mi)
- Highest elevation: 671 m (2,201 ft)
- Lowest elevation: 506 m (1,660 ft)
- Population (2023): 95
  - Density: 10/km^{2} (26/sq mi)
- Time zone: UTC+01:00 (CET)
  - Summer (DST): UTC+02:00 (CEST)
- INSEE/Postal code: 25053 /25430
- ^{1} French Land Register data, which excludes lakes, ponds, glaciers > 1 km^{2} (0.386 sq mi or 247 acres) and river estuaries.

Belvoir (French pronunciation: [bɛlvwaʁ]) is a commune in the Doubs department in the Bourgogne-Franche-Comté region in eastern France.

== Geography ==
Belvoir lies 18 km (11 mi) southeast of Clerval on a prominent hill.

== History ==
Belvoir is noted for the Belvoir Castle, Château de Belvoir in French, built by Jean de Chalon. It has been rebuilt, now dating to the 12th-17th centuries, and the date of 1224 inscribed above the arch of the north tower is the oldest inscription in Arabic numerals in the region.

Of the first lords of Belvoir, a branch of the Rougemont family, Hue (Huon) I (c. 1188-1239) was a Crusader.

The domain later became the property of the Cusance family, of which Béatrix de Cusance is arguably the most famous member, and the Rohan family were the last noble owners of the castle.

== Population ==
Historical population
Year	Pop.	±% p.a.
1968	130	—
1975	115	−1.74%
1982	100	−1.98%
1990	98	−0.25%
1999	102	+0.45%
2007	99	−0.37%
2012	97	−0.41%
2017	104	+1.40%
2023	95	−1.50%
Source: INSEE

== See also ==
- Belvoir disambiguation page
- Communes of the Doubs department
