= L'Isle-sur-le-Doubs =

Commune in Bourgogne-Franche-Comté, France

- Commune
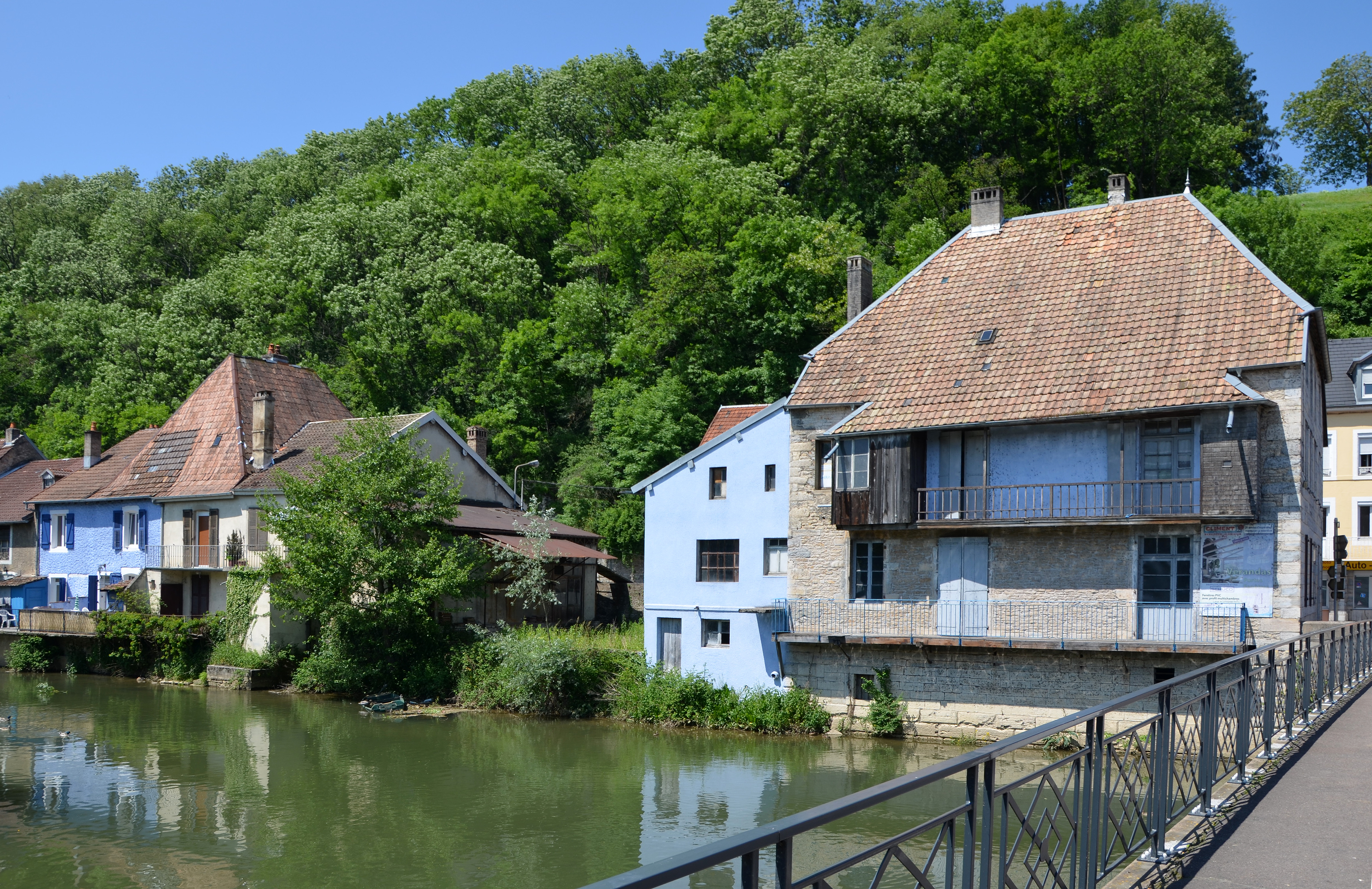
- A branch of the Doubs river in L'Isle-sur-le-Doubs

- Coat of arms
- Location of L'Isle-sur-le-Doubs
- Location within France Location within Bourgogne-Franche-Comté
- Coordinates: 47°26′55″N 6°35′13″E
- Country: France
- Region: Bourgogne-Franche-Comté
- Department: Doubs
- Arrondissement: Montbéliard
- Canton: Bavans

Government
  - Mayor (2020–2026): Alain Roth
- Area^{1}: 10.67 km^{2} (4.12 sq mi)
- Highest elevation: 500 m (1,600 ft)
- Lowest elevation: 285 m (935 ft)
- Population (2023): 2,780
  - Density: 261/km^{2} (675/sq mi)
- Time zone: UTC+01:00 (CET)
  - Summer (DST): UTC+02:00 (CEST)
- INSEE/Postal code: 25315 /25250
- ^{1} French Land Register data, which excludes lakes, ponds, glaciers > 1 km^{2} (0.386 sq mi or 247 acres) and river estuaries.

L'Isle-sur-le-Doubs (French pronunciation: [lil syʁ lə du]) is a commune in the Doubs department in the Bourgogne-Franche-Comté region in eastern France.

== Geography ==
The communes is situated 65 km (40 mi) northeast of Besançon and 25 km (16 mi) southwest of Montbéliard. The town lies at the foot of a cliff, so expansion took place on the other side of the river Doubs.

== History ==
The town of l'Isle-sur-le-Doubs was formed from the merging of the villages of Fusnans, Carnans, and Uxelles. It belonged originally to the abbey of Les Trois Rois, and was then ceded to the Count of Neufchâtel, who built his castle there in 1230, only the foundations of which remain.

== Population ==
The inhabitants of the commune are called l'Islois in French.

Historical population
Year	Pop.	±% p.a.
1968	3,231	—
1975	3,442	+0.91%
1982	3,205	−1.01%
1990	3,203	−0.01%
1999	3,305	+0.35%
2007	3,316	+0.04%
2012	3,127	−1.17%
2017	2,997	−0.85%
2023	2,780	−1.24%
Source: INSEE

== Tourism ==
The commune has a three-star camping ground and attracts many tourists who go fishing in the Doubs. Hiking trails are also numerous in the surrounding countryside.

== See also ==
- Communes of the Doubs department
