= ORV =

ORV or orv may refer to:

- Austrian Luge Federation (German: Österreichischer Rodelverband)
- Austrian Rugby Federation (German: Österreichischer Rugby Verband)
- Ocean Range Vessel, a fleet of US Air Force ships
- Obiteljski Radio Valentino, a Bosnian radio station
- Off-road vehicle
- Old East Slavic (ISO 639-3 code)
- Oral rabies vaccine
- a series of Indian research vessels
- Robert (Bob) Curtis Memorial Airport (IATA: ORV), Noorvik, Alaska
- Omniscient Reader's Viewpoint, a South Korean Webnovel

== See also ==
- Orve, a commune in the Doubs department of France
