= Vyt =

Vyt may refer to:

- Vyt-lès-Belvoir, a commune in France
- Vyt Bakaitis (born 1940), American translator, editor, and poet
- Charles Vyt (1914–?), Belgian pentathlete

VYT may stand for:

- Valley Youth Theatre, in Arizona, US

== See also ==
- Vyts, nickname of Vytautas Beliajus (1908–1994), Lithuanian–American folk dancer
