= Vaudrivillers =

- Commune
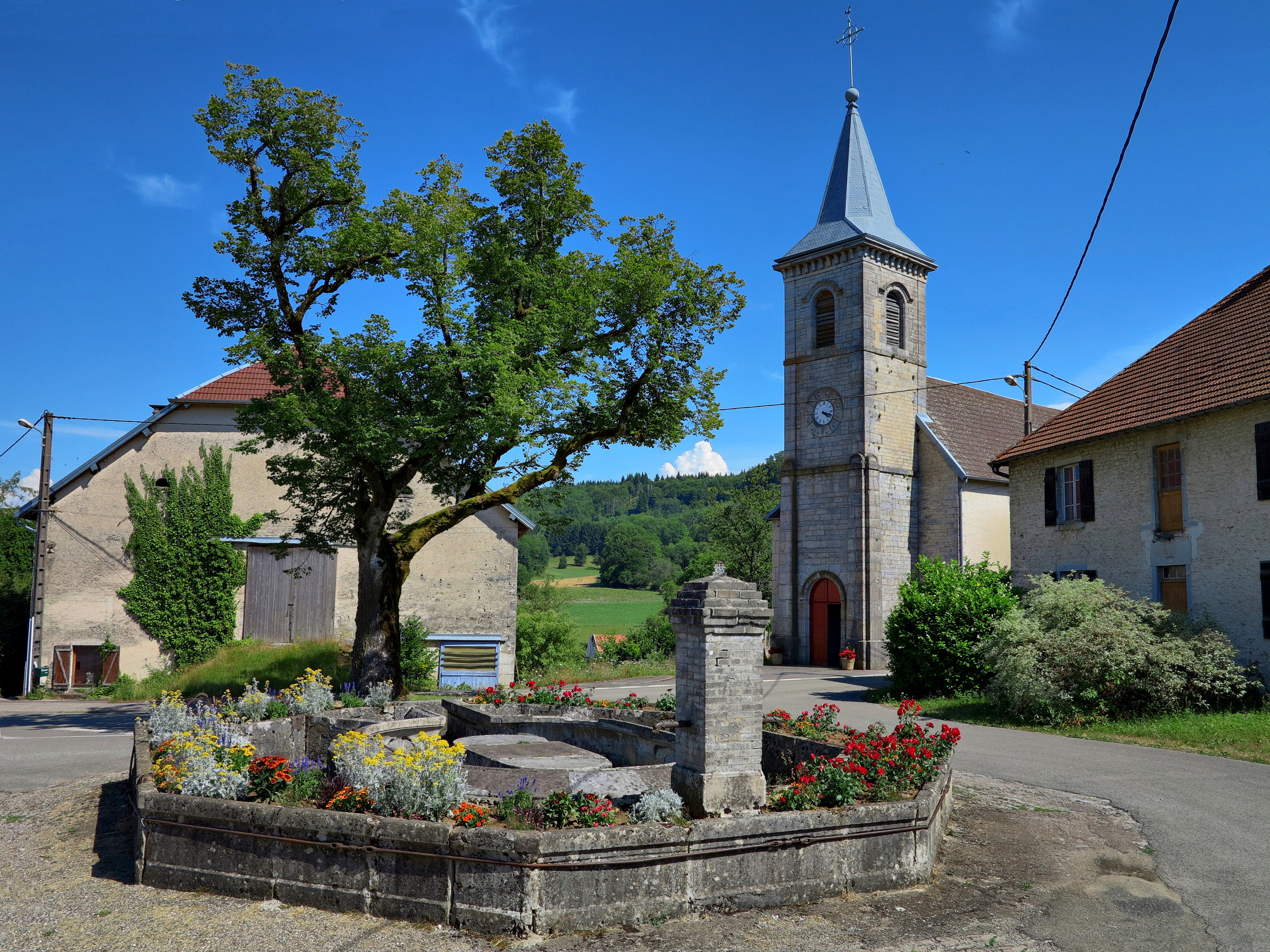
- The church and water trough in Vaudrivillers
- Location of Vaudrivillers
- Location within France Location within Bourgogne-Franche-Comté
- Coordinates: 47°16′56″N 6°25′35″E
- Country: France
- Region: Bourgogne-Franche-Comté
- Department: Doubs
- Arrondissement: Besançon
- Canton: Bavans

Government
  - Mayor (2020–2026): Benoît Ciresa
- Area^{1}: 3.65 km^{2} (1.41 sq mi)
- Highest elevation: 660 m (2,170 ft)
- Lowest elevation: 480 m (1,570 ft)
- Population (2023): 77
  - Density: 21/km^{2} (55/sq mi)
- Time zone: UTC+01:00 (CET)
  - Summer (DST): UTC+02:00 (CEST)
- INSEE/Postal code: 25590 /25360
- ^{1} French Land Register data, which excludes lakes, ponds, glaciers > 1 km^{2} (0.386 sq mi or 247 acres) and river estuaries.

Vaudrivillers is a commune in the Doubs department in the Bourgogne-Franche-Comté region in eastern France.

== Geography ==
Vaudrivillers lies 15 km (9.3 mi) from Baume-les-Dames.

== Population ==
Historical population
Year	Pop.	±% p.a.
1968	49	—
1975	48	−0.29%
1982	71	+5.75%
1990	73	+0.35%
1999	75	+0.30%
2007	79	+0.65%
2012	81	+0.50%
2017	91	+2.36%
2023	77	−2.75%
Source: INSEE

== See also ==
- Communes of the Doubs department
