= Échenans =

- Commune
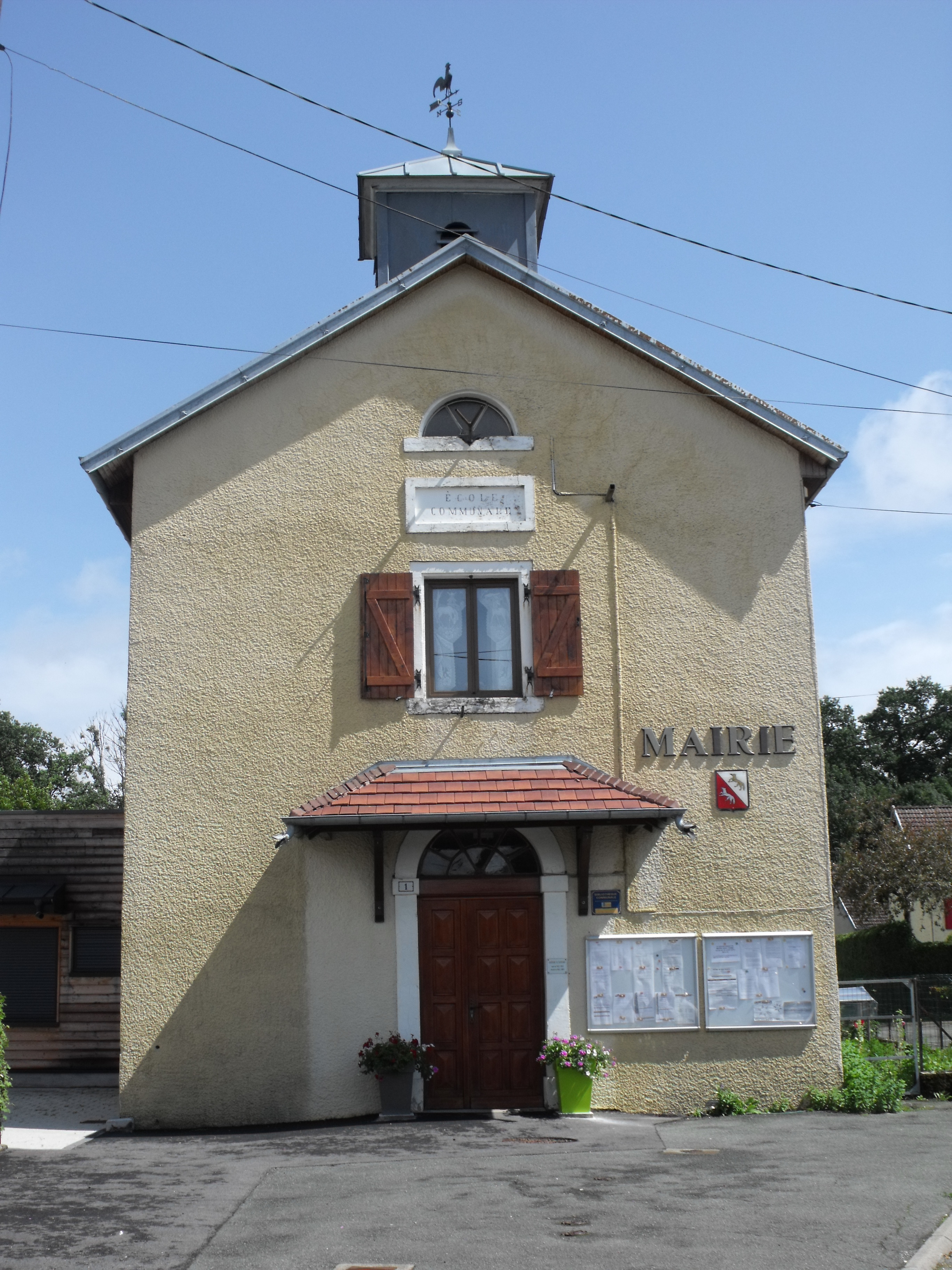
- The town hall in Échenans

- Coat of arms
- Location of Échenans
- Location within France Location within Bourgogne-Franche-Comté
- Coordinates: 47°31′37″N 6°41′46″E
- Country: France
- Region: Bourgogne-Franche-Comté
- Department: Doubs
- Arrondissement: Montbéliard
- Canton: Bavans
- Intercommunality: Pays de Montbéliard Agglomération

Government
  - Mayor (2020–2026): Christian Pileyre
- Area^{1}: 1.7 km^{2} (0.66 sq mi)
- Highest elevation: 387 m (1,270 ft)
- Lowest elevation: 342 m (1,122 ft)
- Population (2023): 163
  - Density: 96/km^{2} (250/sq mi)
- Time zone: UTC+01:00 (CET)
  - Summer (DST): UTC+02:00 (CEST)
- INSEE/Postal code: 25210 /25550
- ^{1} French Land Register data, which excludes lakes, ponds, glaciers > 1 km^{2} (0.386 sq mi or 247 acres) and river estuaries.

Échenans is a commune in the Doubs department in the Bourgogne-Franche-Comté region in eastern France.

== Population ==
Historical population
Year	Pop.	±% p.a.
1968	38	—
1975	33	−2.00%
1982	90	+15.41%
1990	117	+3.33%
1999	115	−0.19%
2007	114	−0.11%
2012	135	+3.44%
2017	155	+2.80%
2023	163	+0.84%
Source: INSEE

== See also ==
- Communes of the Doubs department
