= Marvelise =

- Commune
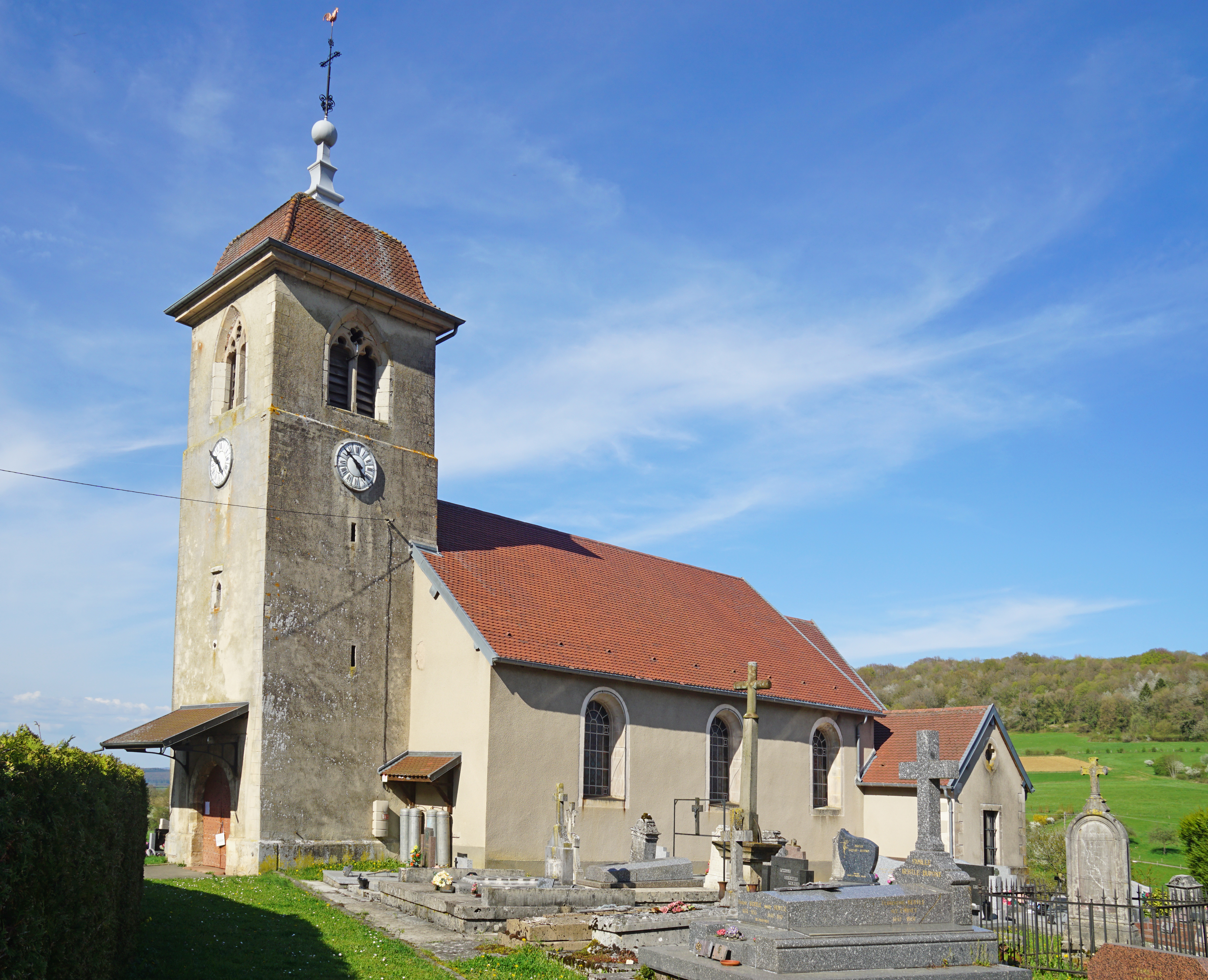
- The church in Marvelise
- Location of Marvelise
- Location within France Location within Bourgogne-Franche-Comté
- Coordinates: 47°31′23″N 6°35′35″E
- Country: France
- Region: Bourgogne-Franche-Comté
- Department: Doubs
- Arrondissement: Montbéliard
- Canton: Bavans
- Intercommunality: Deux Vallées Vertes

Government
  - Mayor (2020–2026): Virginie Merciol
- Area^{1}: 4.21 km^{2} (1.63 sq mi)
- Highest elevation: 513 m (1,683 ft)
- Lowest elevation: 329 m (1,079 ft)
- Population (2023): 147
  - Density: 34.9/km^{2} (90.4/sq mi)
- Time zone: UTC+01:00 (CET)
  - Summer (DST): UTC+02:00 (CEST)
- INSEE/Postal code: 25369 /25250
- ^{1} French Land Register data, which excludes lakes, ponds, glaciers > 1 km^{2} (0.386 sq mi or 247 acres) and river estuaries.

Marvelise (French pronunciation: [maʁvəliz]) is a commune in the Doubs département in the Bourgogne-Franche-Comté region in eastern France.

== Geography ==
Marvelise is located 35 km (22 mi) from the Swiss border in the Jura Mountains. On the east are the Hauts des Roches (502 m) and on the west the Chanois (516 m).

== Population ==
Historical population
Year	Pop.	±% p.a.
1968	90	—
1975	97	+1.08%
1982	134	+4.72%
1990	119	−1.47%
1999	139	+1.74%
2007	155	+1.37%
2012	149	−0.79%
2017	165	+2.06%
2023	147	−1.91%
Source: INSEE

== See also ==
- Communes of the Doubs department
