= Crosey-le-Petit =

- Commune
- Coat of arms
- Location of Crosey-le-Petit
- Location within France Location within Bourgogne-Franche-Comté
- Coordinates: 47°21′09″N 6°29′12″E
- Country: France
- Region: Bourgogne-Franche-Comté
- Department: Doubs
- Arrondissement: Montbéliard
- Canton: Bavans
- Intercommunality: Pays de Sancey-Belleherbe

Government
  - Mayor (2020–2026): Chantal Renaude
- Area^{1}: 9.6 km^{2} (3.7 sq mi)
- Highest elevation: 578 m (1,896 ft)
- Lowest elevation: 389 m (1,276 ft)
- Population (2023): 119
  - Density: 12/km^{2} (32/sq mi)
- Time zone: UTC+01:00 (CET)
  - Summer (DST): UTC+02:00 (CEST)
- INSEE/Postal code: 25178 /25340
- ^{1} French Land Register data, which excludes lakes, ponds, glaciers > 1 km^{2} (0.386 sq mi or 247 acres) and river estuaries.

Crosey-le-Petit (French pronunciation: [kʁozɛ lə pəti]) is a commune in the Doubs department in the Bourgogne-Franche-Comté region in eastern France.

== Population ==
Historical population
Year	Pop.	±% p.a.
1968	107	—
1975	102	−0.68%
1982	116	+1.85%
1990	108	−0.89%
1999	104	−0.42%
2007	109	+0.59%
2012	123	+2.45%
2017	135	+1.88%
2023	119	−2.08%
Source: INSEE

== See also ==
- Communes of the Doubs department
