= Sourans =

- Commune
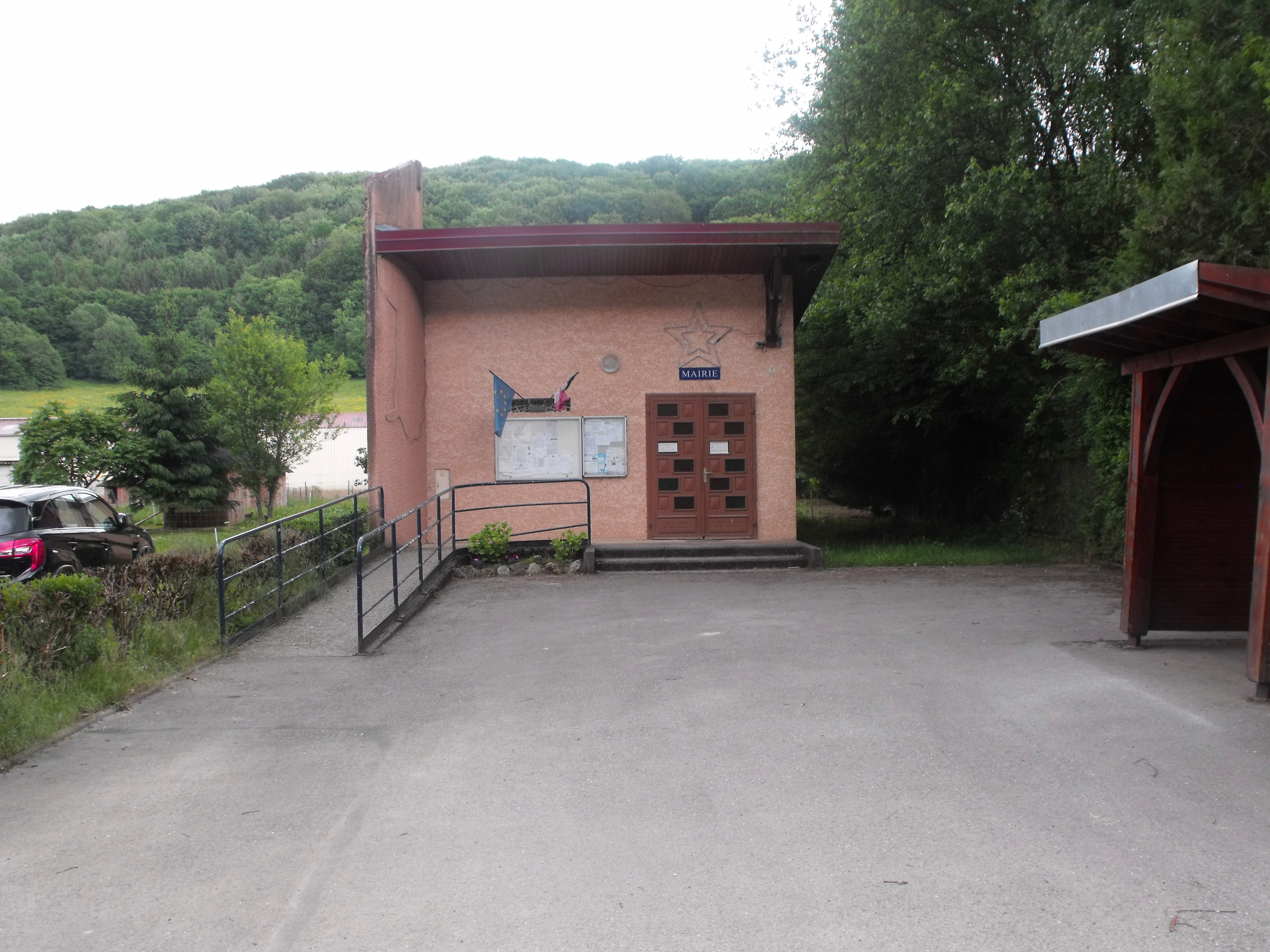
- The town hall in Sourans
- Location of Sourans
- Location within France Location within Bourgogne-Franche-Comté
- Coordinates: 47°24′32″N 6°37′59″E
- Country: France
- Region: Bourgogne-Franche-Comté
- Department: Doubs
- Arrondissement: Montbéliard
- Canton: Bavans

Government
  - Mayor (2020–2026): Nathalie Parent
- Area^{1}: 4.2 km^{2} (1.6 sq mi)
- Highest elevation: 558 m (1,831 ft)
- Lowest elevation: 341 m (1,119 ft)
- Population (2023): 113
  - Density: 27/km^{2} (70/sq mi)
- Time zone: UTC+01:00 (CET)
  - Summer (DST): UTC+02:00 (CEST)
- INSEE/Postal code: 25552 /25250
- ^{1} French Land Register data, which excludes lakes, ponds, glaciers > 1 km^{2} (0.386 sq mi or 247 acres) and river estuaries.

Sourans (French pronunciation: [suʁɑ̃]) is a commune in the Doubs department in the Bourgogne-Franche-Comté region in eastern France.

== Geography ==
Sourans lies 8 km (5.0 mi) southeast of L'Isle-sur-le-Doubs in the valley of the Sourans.

== Demographics ==
Historical population
Year	Pop.	±% p.a.
1968	98	—
1975	113	+2.06%
1982	115	+0.25%
1990	119	+0.43%
1999	128	+0.81%
2007	122	−0.60%
2012	130	+1.28%
2017	118	−1.92%
2023	113	−0.72%
Source: INSEE

== See also ==
- Communes of the Doubs department
