= Arcey, Doubs =

Arcey
- Commune
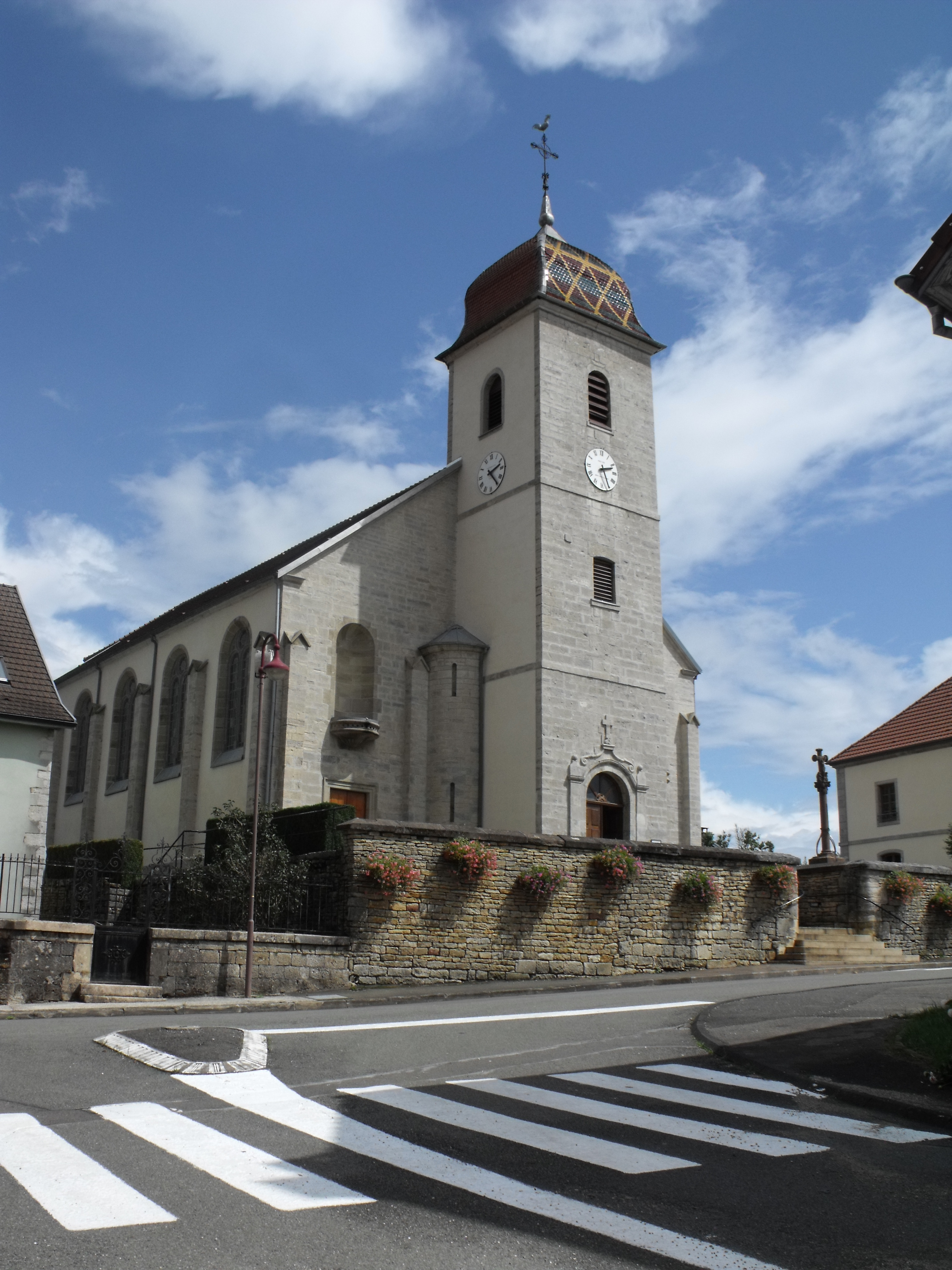
- The church in Arcey

- Coat of arms
- Location of Arcey
- Location within France Location within Bourgogne-Franche-Comté
- Coordinates: 47°31′23″N 6°39′41″E
- Country: France
- Region: Bourgogne-Franche-Comté
- Department: Doubs
- Arrondissement: Montbéliard
- Canton: Bavans

Government
  - Mayor (2023–2026): Michaël Hugoniot
- Area^{1}: 12.57 km^{2} (4.85 sq mi)
- Highest elevation: 490 m (1,610 ft)
- Lowest elevation: 347 m (1,138 ft)
- Population (2023): 1,489
  - Density: 118.5/km^{2} (306.8/sq mi)
- Time zone: UTC+01:00 (CET)
  - Summer (DST): UTC+02:00 (CEST)
- INSEE/Postal code: 25022 /25750
- ^{1} French Land Register data, which excludes lakes, ponds, glaciers > 1 km^{2} (0.386 sq mi or 247 acres) and river estuaries.

Arcey (French pronunciation: [aʁsɛ]; Franc-Comtois: Airceis) is a commune in the Doubs department in the Bourgogne-Franche-Comté region in eastern France.

== Geography ==
Arcey is located in the northeast of Bourgogne-Franche-Comté, about 12 km from Montbéliard, about 30 km (19 mi) from Belfort, about 60 km (37 mi) from Besançon, and about 25 km from the Swiss border.

== Population ==
Historical population
Year	Pop.	±% p.a.
1968	652	—
1975	917	+4.99%
1982	1,071	+2.24%
1990	1,101	+0.35%
1999	1,174	+0.72%
2007	1,353	+1.79%
2012	1,441	+1.27%
2017	1,441	+0.00%
2023	1,489	+0.55%
Source: INSEE

== See also ==
- Communes of the Doubs department
