= L'Hôpital-Saint-Lieffroy =

- Commune
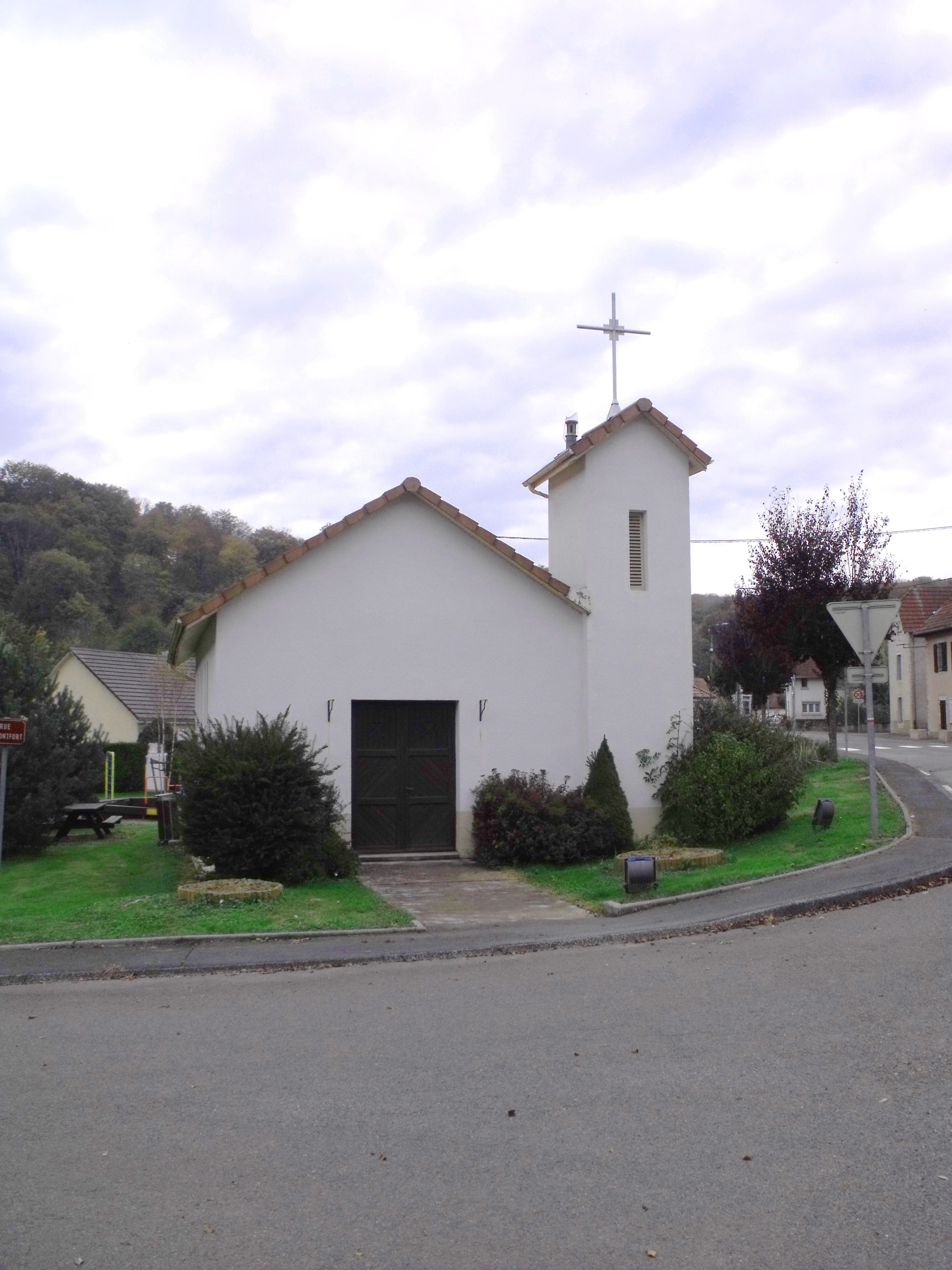
- The chapel in L'Hôpital-Saint-Lieffroy
- Location of L'Hôpital-Saint-Lieffroy
- Location within France Location within Bourgogne-Franche-Comté
- Coordinates: 47°23′59″N 6°27′29″E
- Country: France
- Region: Bourgogne-Franche-Comté
- Department: Doubs
- Arrondissement: Montbéliard
- Canton: Bavans

Government
  - Mayor (2020–2026): Yves Boillot
- Area^{1}: 3.43 km^{2} (1.32 sq mi)
- Highest elevation: 445 m (1,460 ft)
- Lowest elevation: 315 m (1,033 ft)
- Population (2023): 121
  - Density: 35.3/km^{2} (91.4/sq mi)
- Time zone: UTC+01:00 (CET)
  - Summer (DST): UTC+02:00 (CEST)
- INSEE/Postal code: 25306 /25340
- ^{1} French Land Register data, which excludes lakes, ponds, glaciers > 1 km^{2} (0.386 sq mi or 247 acres) and river estuaries.

L'Hôpital-Saint-Lieffroy (French pronunciation: [lopital sɛ̃ ljɛfʁwa]) is a commune in the Doubs department in the Bourgogne-Franche-Comté region in eastern France.

== Population ==
Historical population
Year	Pop.	±% p.a.
1968	54	—
1975	50	−1.09%
1982	87	+8.23%
1990	74	−2.00%
1999	72	−0.30%
2007	85	+2.10%
2012	97	+2.68%
2017	114	+3.28%
2023	121	+1.00%
Source: INSEE

== See also ==
- Communes of the Doubs department
