= La Prétière =

- Commune
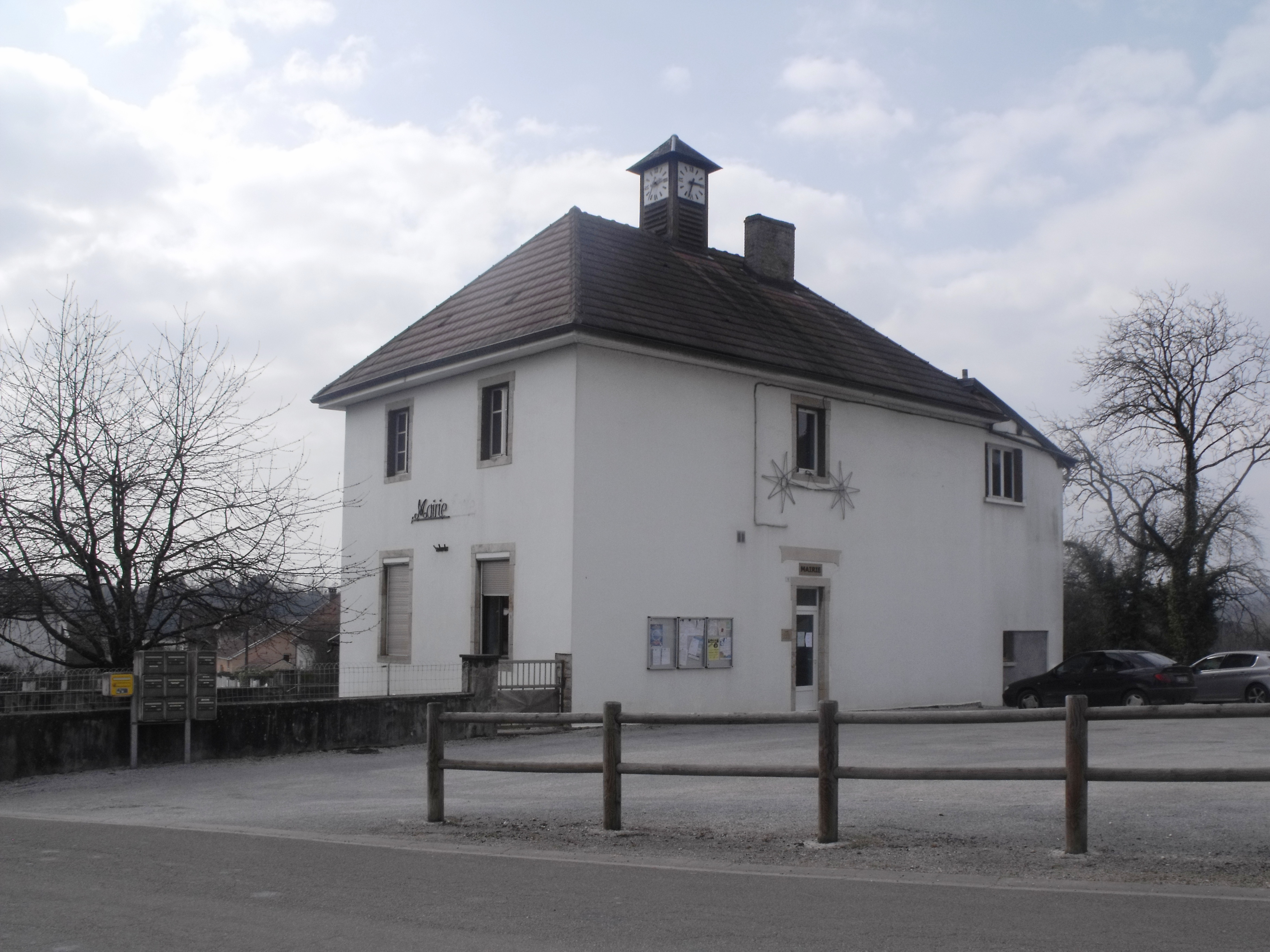
- The town hall in La Prétière
- Location of La Prétière
- Location within France Location within Bourgogne-Franche-Comté
- Coordinates: 47°26′43″N 6°36′37″E
- Country: France
- Region: Bourgogne-Franche-Comté
- Department: Doubs
- Arrondissement: Montbéliard
- Canton: Bavans

Government
  - Mayor (2020–2026): Pierre Pegeot
- Area^{1}: 2.71 km^{2} (1.05 sq mi)
- Highest elevation: 431 m (1,414 ft)
- Lowest elevation: 290 m (950 ft)
- Population (2023): 159
  - Density: 58.7/km^{2} (152/sq mi)
- Time zone: UTC+01:00 (CET)
  - Summer (DST): UTC+02:00 (CEST)
- INSEE/Postal code: 25470 /25250
- ^{1} French Land Register data, which excludes lakes, ponds, glaciers > 1 km^{2} (0.386 sq mi or 247 acres) and river estuaries.

La Prétière (French pronunciation: [la pʁetjɛʁ]) is a commune in the Doubs department in the Bourgogne-Franche-Comté region in eastern France.

== Geography ==
The commune lies 4 km (2.5 mi) east of L'Isle-sur-le-Doubs. It is surrounded by 7.3 km^{2} (2.8 sq mi) of forest.

== Population ==
Historical population
Year	Pop.	±% p.a.
1968	134	—
1975	136	+0.21%
1982	158	+2.17%
1990	149	−0.73%
1999	137	−0.93%
2007	150	+1.14%
2012	179	+3.60%
2017	156	−2.71%
2023	159	+0.32%
Source: INSEE

== See also ==
- Communes of the Doubs department
