= Randevillers =

- Commune
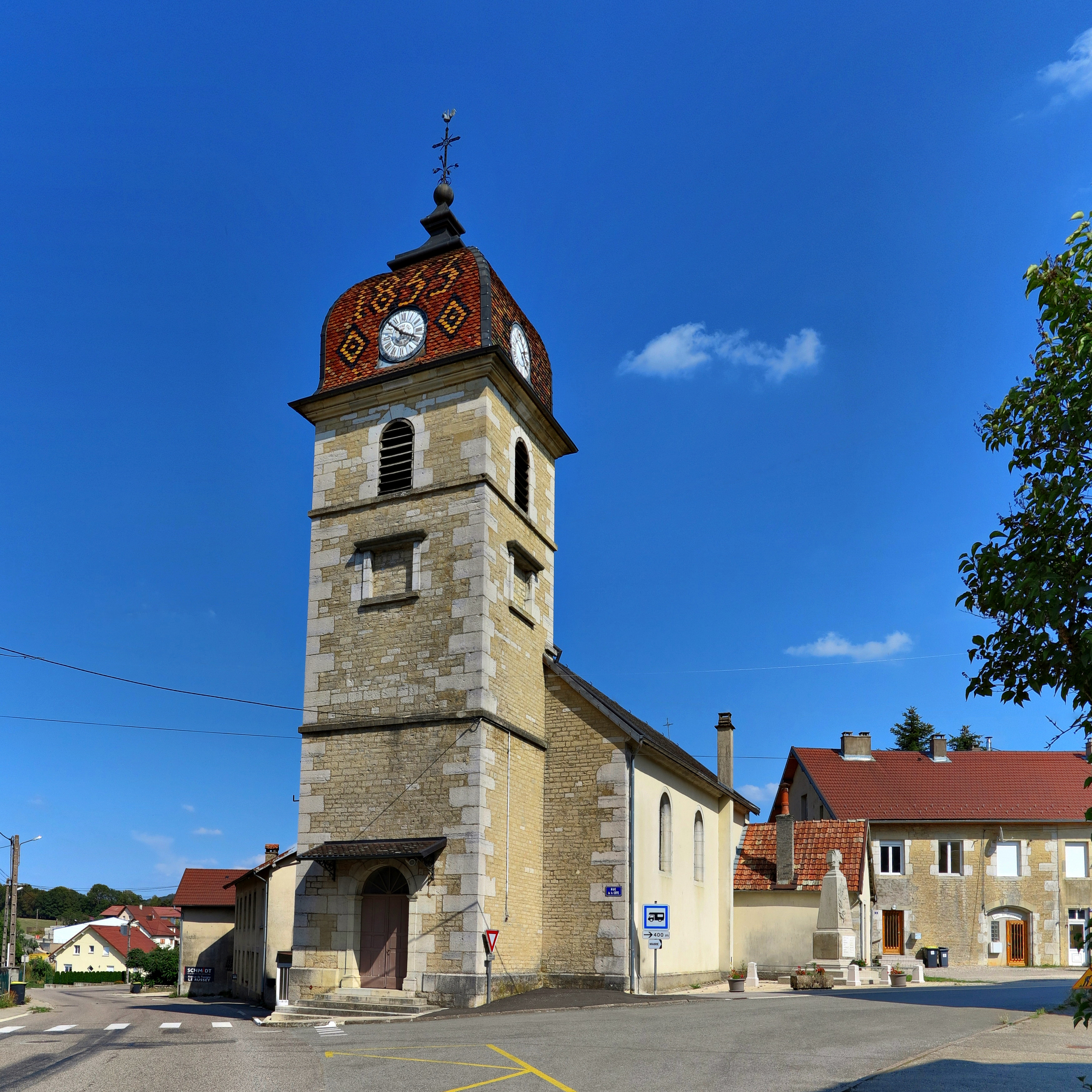
- The church in Randevillers
- Location of Randevillers
- Location within France Location within Bourgogne-Franche-Comté
- Coordinates: 47°18′41″N 6°31′20″E
- Country: France
- Region: Bourgogne-Franche-Comté
- Department: Doubs
- Arrondissement: Montbéliard
- Canton: Bavans

Government
  - Mayor (2020–2026): Virginie Dayet
- Area^{1}: 4.36 km^{2} (1.68 sq mi)
- Highest elevation: 662 m (2,172 ft)
- Lowest elevation: 460 m (1,510 ft)
- Population (2023): 106
  - Density: 24.3/km^{2} (63.0/sq mi)
- Time zone: UTC+01:00 (CET)
  - Summer (DST): UTC+02:00 (CEST)
- INSEE/Postal code: 25478 /25430
- ^{1} French Land Register data, which excludes lakes, ponds, glaciers > 1 km^{2} (0.386 sq mi or 247 acres) and river estuaries.

Randevillers is a commune in the Doubs department in the Bourgogne-Franche-Comté region in eastern France.

== Geography ==
Randevillers lies 45 km (28 mi) from Besançon and Montbéliard.

== Population ==
Historical population
Year	Pop.	±% p.a.
1968	147	—
1975	124	−2.40%
1982	107	−2.08%
1990	113	+0.68%
1999	113	+0.00%
2007	101	−1.39%
2012	108	+1.35%
2017	122	+2.47%
2023	106	−2.32%
Source: INSEE

== See also ==
- Communes of the Doubs department
