= Lanans =

- Commune
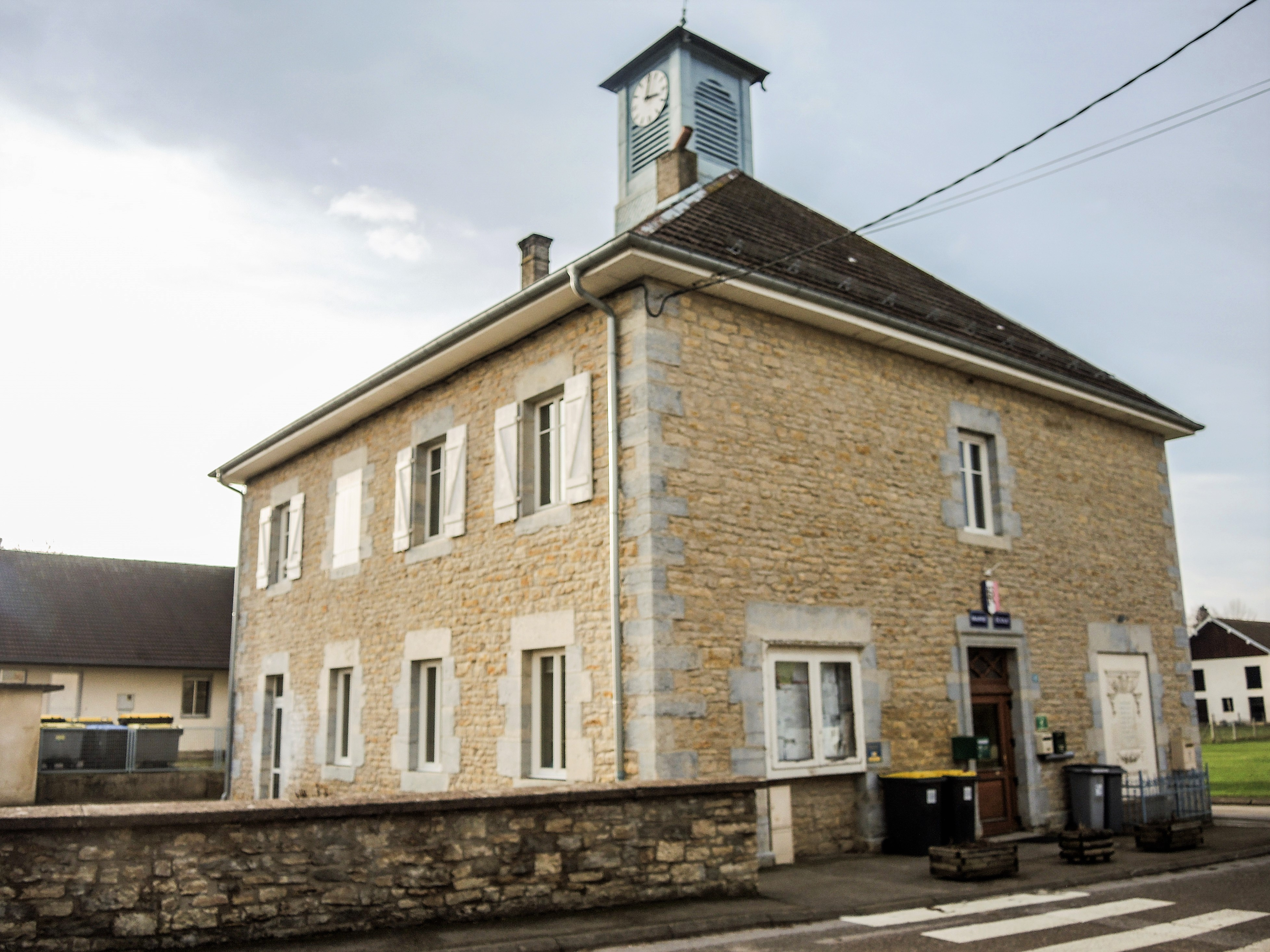
- The town hall in Lanans

- Coat of arms
- Location of Lanans
- Location within France Location within Bourgogne-Franche-Comté
- Coordinates: 47°17′51″N 6°26′59″E
- Country: France
- Region: Bourgogne-Franche-Comté
- Department: Doubs
- Arrondissement: Besançon
- Canton: Bavans

Government
  - Mayor (2020–2026): Dominique Perdrix
- Area^{1}: 10.05 km^{2} (3.88 sq mi)
- Highest elevation: 680 m (2,230 ft)
- Lowest elevation: 399 m (1,309 ft)
- Population (2023): 163
  - Density: 16.2/km^{2} (42.0/sq mi)
- Time zone: UTC+01:00 (CET)
  - Summer (DST): UTC+02:00 (CEST)
- INSEE/Postal code: 25324 /25360
- ^{1} French Land Register data, which excludes lakes, ponds, glaciers > 1 km^{2} (0.386 sq mi or 247 acres) and river estuaries.

Lanans (French pronunciation: [lanɑ̃]) is a commune in the Doubs department in the Bourgogne-Franche-Comté region in eastern France.

== Geography ==
The commune is situated on the plateau above the valley of the Cusancin.

== Population ==
Historical population
Year	Pop.	±% p.a.
1968	153	—
1975	129	−2.41%
1982	115	−1.63%
1990	92	−2.75%
1999	108	+1.80%
2007	136	+2.92%
2012	133	−0.45%
2017	167	+4.66%
2023	163	−0.40%
Source: INSEE

== Economy ==
The local economy is largely agricultural, including viticulture. Other commercial activities include forestry, transport, and masonry.

== See also ==
- Communes of the Doubs department
