= Allondans =

- Commune
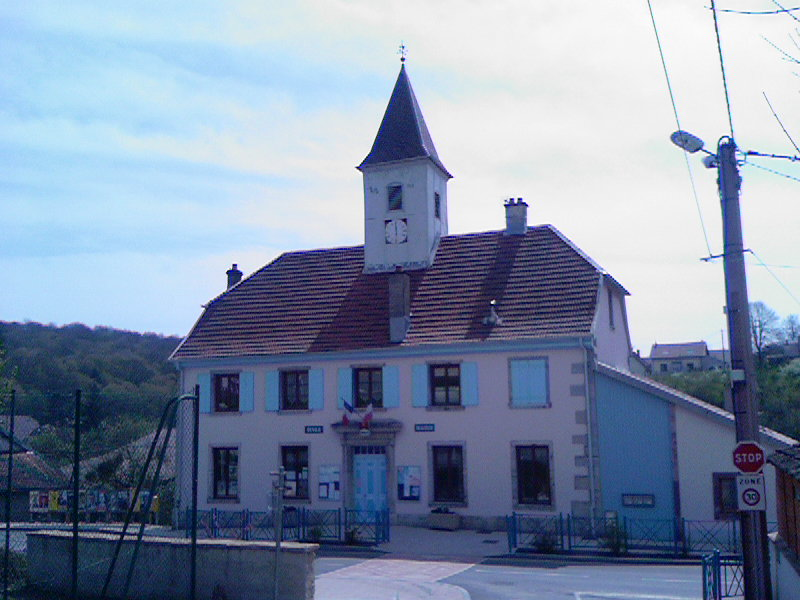
- Town hall

- Coat of arms
- Location of Allondans
- Location within France Location within Bourgogne-Franche-Comté
- Coordinates: 47°31′12″N 6°44′54″E
- Country: France
- Region: Bourgogne-Franche-Comté
- Department: Doubs
- Arrondissement: Montbéliard
- Canton: Bavans
- Intercommunality: Pays de Montbéliard Agglomération

Government
  - Mayor (2020–2026): Agnès Martin
- Area^{1}: 5.14 km^{2} (1.98 sq mi)
- Highest elevation: 435 m (1,427 ft)
- Lowest elevation: 325 m (1,066 ft)
- Population (2023): 234
  - Density: 45.5/km^{2} (118/sq mi)
- Time zone: UTC+01:00 (CET)
  - Summer (DST): UTC+02:00 (CEST)
- INSEE/Postal code: 25013 /25550
- ^{1} French Land Register data, which excludes lakes, ponds, glaciers > 1 km^{2} (0.386 sq mi or 247 acres) and river estuaries.

Allondans (French pronunciation: [alɔ̃dɑ̃]) is a commune in the Doubs department in the Bourgogne-Franche-Comté region in eastern France.

== Population ==
Historical population
Year	Pop.	±% p.a.
1968	192	—
1975	187	−0.38%
1982	176	−0.86%
1990	179	+0.21%
1999	191	+0.72%
2007	215	+1.49%
2012	235	+1.79%
2017	253	+1.49%
2023	234	−1.29%
Source: INSEE

== See also ==
- Communes of the Doubs department
