= Chazot =

- Commune
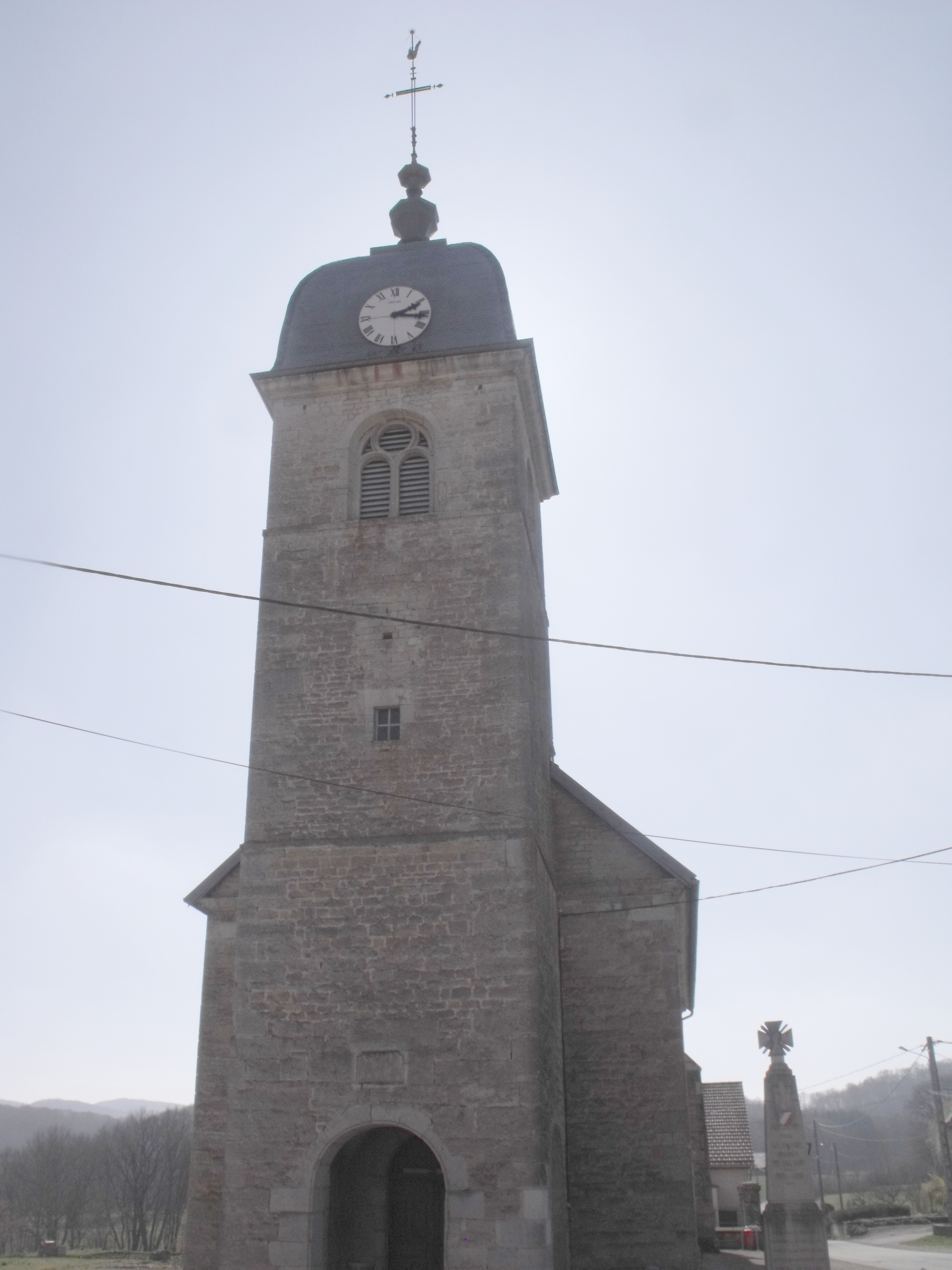
- The church in Chazot
- Location of Chazot
- Location within France Location within Bourgogne-Franche-Comté
- Coordinates: 47°19′37″N 6°32′38″E
- Country: France
- Region: Bourgogne-Franche-Comté
- Department: Doubs
- Arrondissement: Montbéliard
- Canton: Bavans

Government
  - Mayor (2020–2026): Jerome Boillin
- Area^{1}: 5.35 km^{2} (2.07 sq mi)
- Highest elevation: 641 m (2,103 ft)
- Lowest elevation: 428 m (1,404 ft)
- Population (2023): 117
  - Density: 21.9/km^{2} (56.6/sq mi)
- Time zone: UTC+01:00 (CET)
  - Summer (DST): UTC+02:00 (CEST)
- INSEE/Postal code: 25145 /25430
- ^{1} French Land Register data, which excludes lakes, ponds, glaciers > 1 km^{2} (0.386 sq mi or 247 acres) and river estuaries.

Chazot (French pronunciation: [ʃazo]) is a commune in the Doubs department in the Bourgogne-Franche-Comté region in eastern France.

== Population ==
Historical population
Year	Pop.	±% p.a.
1968	160	—
1975	135	−2.40%
1982	146	+1.13%
1990	141	−0.43%
1999	124	−1.42%
2007	130	+0.59%
2012	123	−1.10%
2017	120	−0.49%
2023	117	−0.42%
Source: INSEE

== See also ==
- Communes of the Doubs department
