= Étrappe =

- Commune
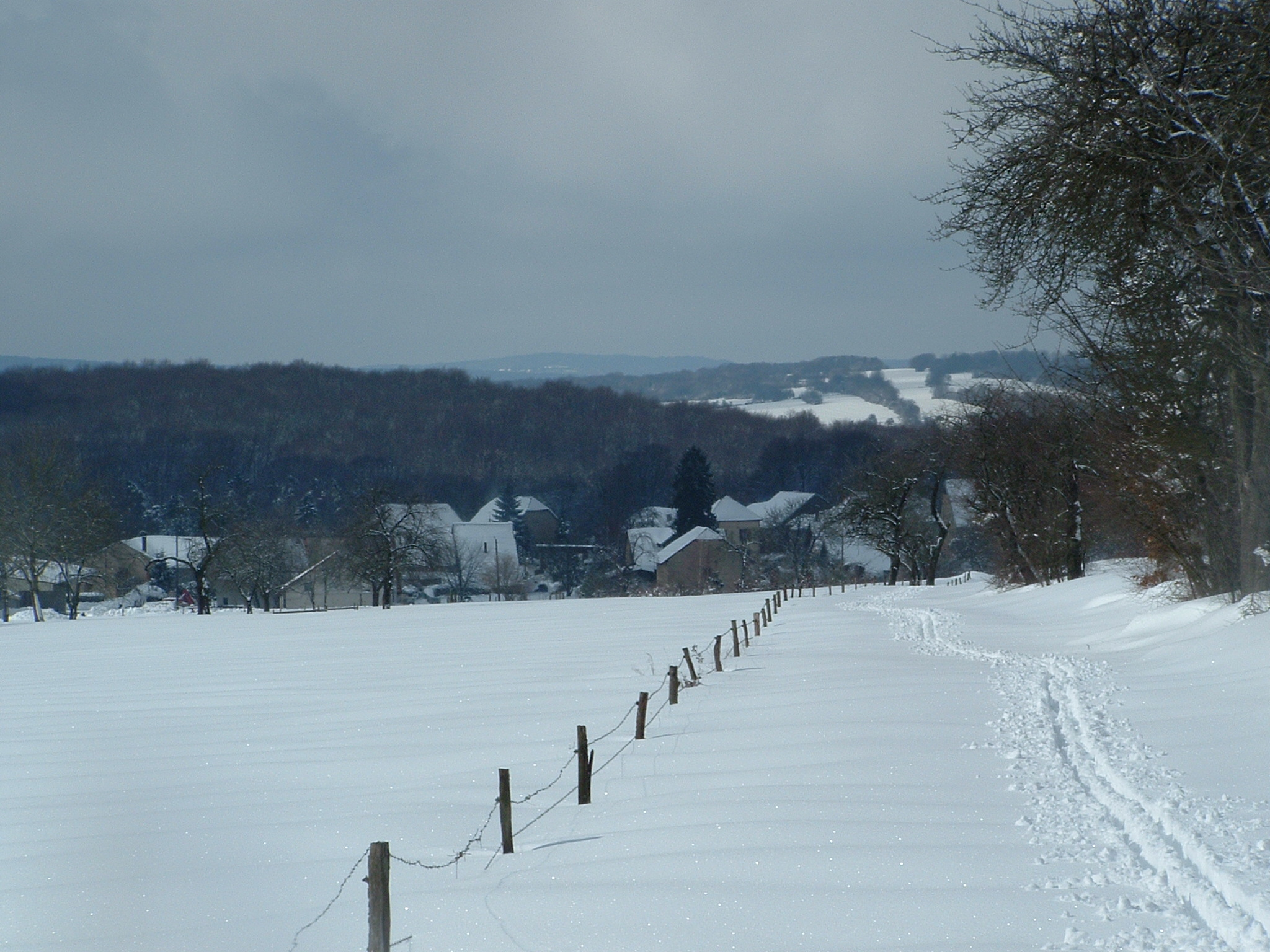
- A general view of Étrappe
- Location of Étrappe
- Location within France Location within Bourgogne-Franche-Comté
- Coordinates: 47°28′30″N 6°34′49″E
- Country: France
- Region: Bourgogne-Franche-Comté
- Department: Doubs
- Arrondissement: Montbéliard
- Canton: Bavans

Government
  - Mayor (2020–2026): Bruno Baudrey
- Area^{1}: 2.92 km^{2} (1.13 sq mi)
- Highest elevation: 463 m (1,519 ft)
- Lowest elevation: 296 m (971 ft)
- Population (2023): 202
  - Density: 69.2/km^{2} (179/sq mi)
- Time zone: UTC+01:00 (CET)
  - Summer (DST): UTC+02:00 (CEST)
- INSEE/Postal code: 25226 /25250
- ^{1} French Land Register data, which excludes lakes, ponds, glaciers > 1 km^{2} (0.386 sq mi or 247 acres) and river estuaries.

Étrappe (French pronunciation: [etʁap]) is a commune in the Doubs département in the Bourgogne-Franche-Comté region in eastern France.

== Population ==
Historical population
Year	Pop.	±% p.a.
1968	67	—
1975	100	+5.89%
1982	160	+6.94%
1990	165	+0.39%
1999	161	−0.27%
2007	179	+1.33%
2012	194	+1.62%
2017	213	+1.89%
2023	202	−0.88%
Source: INSEE

== See also ==
- Communes of the Doubs department
