= Blussangeaux =

- Commune
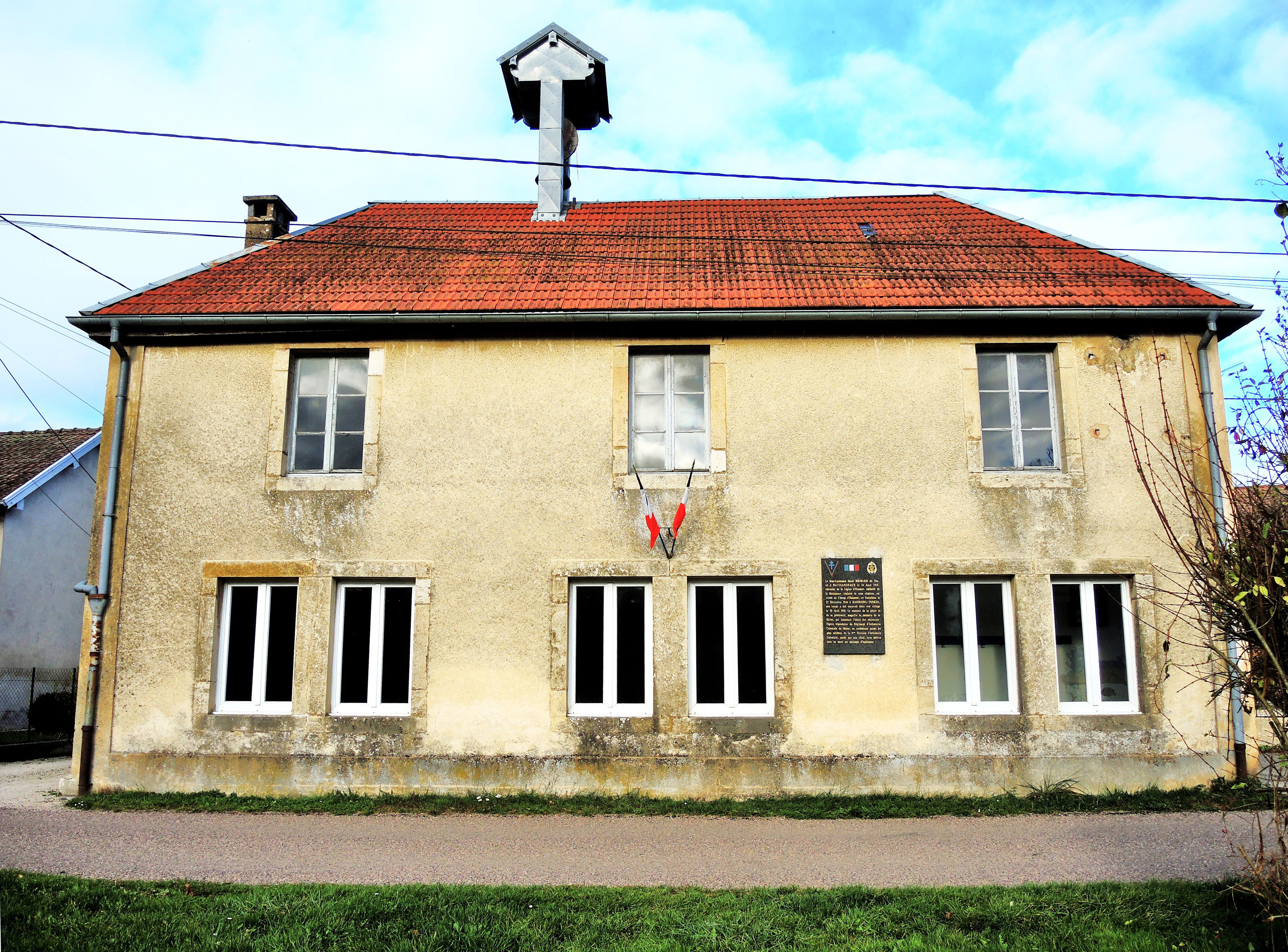
- The town hall in Blussangeaux
- Location of Blussangeaux
- Location within France Location within Bourgogne-Franche-Comté
- Coordinates: 47°25′50″N 6°36′53″E
- Country: France
- Region: Bourgogne-Franche-Comté
- Department: Doubs
- Arrondissement: Montbéliard
- Canton: Bavans

Government
  - Mayor (2020–2026): Marie-Blanche Pernot
- Area^{1}: 2.12 km^{2} (0.82 sq mi)
- Highest elevation: 336 m (1,102 ft)
- Lowest elevation: 292 m (958 ft)
- Population (2023): 75
  - Density: 35/km^{2} (92/sq mi)
- Time zone: UTC+01:00 (CET)
  - Summer (DST): UTC+02:00 (CEST)
- INSEE/Postal code: 25066 /25250
- ^{1} French Land Register data, which excludes lakes, ponds, glaciers > 1 km^{2} (0.386 sq mi or 247 acres) and river estuaries.

Blussangeaux (French pronunciation: [blysɑ̃ʒo]) is a commune in the Doubs department in the Bourgogne-Franche-Comté region in eastern France.

== Population ==
Historical population
Year	Pop.	±% p.a.
1968	71	—
1975	66	−1.04%
1982	70	+0.84%
1990	66	−0.73%
1999	76	+1.58%
2007	70	−1.02%
2012	80	+2.71%
2017	84	+0.98%
2023	75	−1.87%
Source: INSEE

== See also ==
- Communes of the Doubs department
