= Accolans =

- Commune
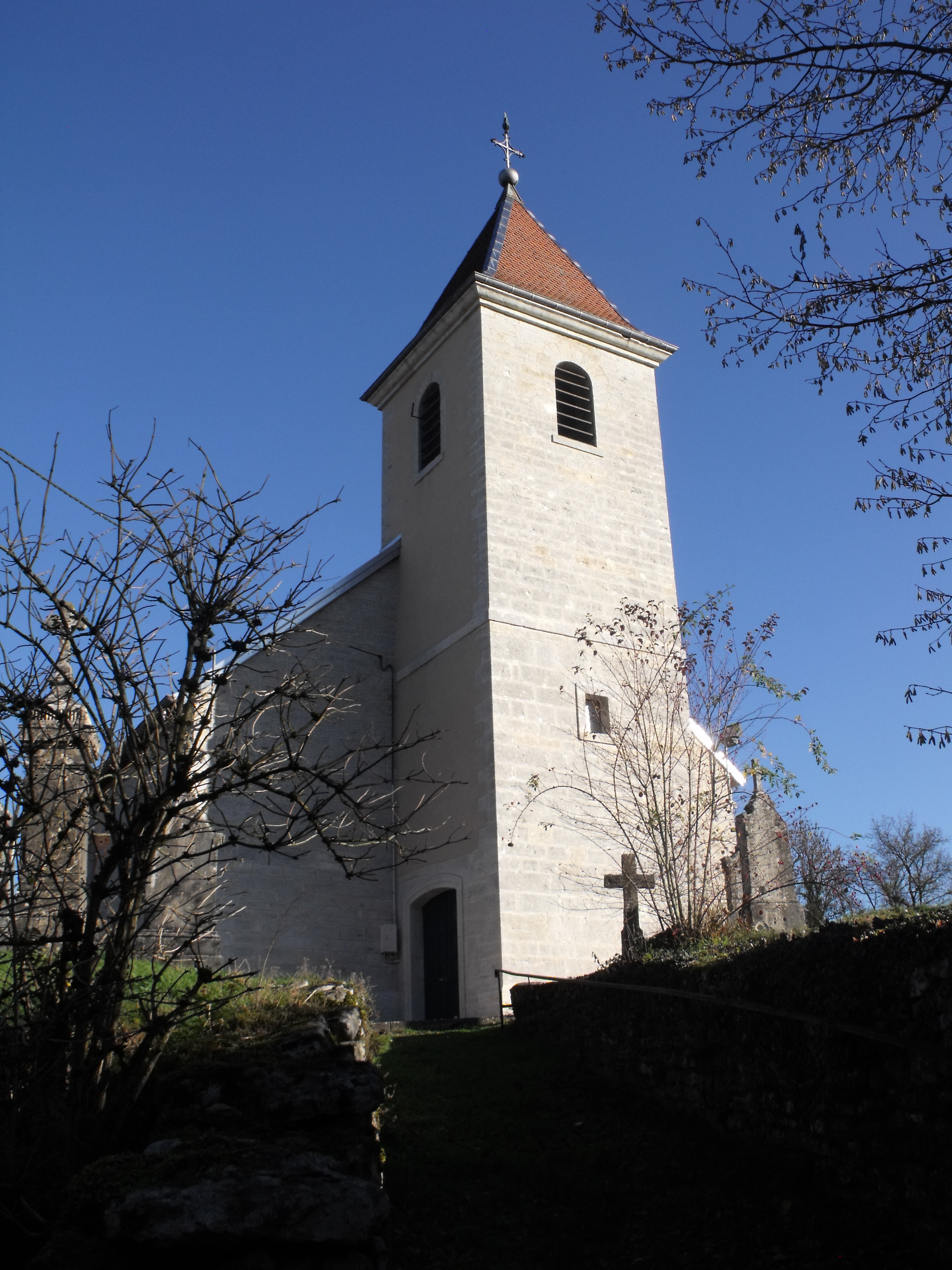
- The church in Accolans

- Coat of arms
- Location of Accolans
- Location within France Location within Bourgogne-Franche-Comté
- Coordinates: 47°29′43″N 6°31′57″E
- Country: France
- Region: Bourgogne-Franche-Comté
- Department: Doubs
- Arrondissement: Montbéliard
- Canton: Bavans
- Intercommunality: Deux Vallées Vertes

Government
  - Mayor (2020–2026): Marie-Odile Bondenet-Druet
- Area^{1}: 5.18 km^{2} (2.00 sq mi)
- Highest elevation: 532 m (1,745 ft)
- Lowest elevation: 360 m (1,180 ft)
- Population (2023): 87
  - Density: 17/km^{2} (43/sq mi)
- Time zone: UTC+01:00 (CET)
  - Summer (DST): UTC+02:00 (CEST)
- INSEE/Postal code: 25005 /25250
- ^{1} French Land Register data, which excludes lakes, ponds, glaciers > 1 km^{2} (0.386 sq mi or 247 acres) and river estuaries.

Accolans (French pronunciation: [akɔlɑ̃]) is a village and commune in the Doubs department in the Bourgogne-Franche-Comté region in eastern France.

== Population ==
Historical population
| Year | Pop. | ±% p.a. |
|---|---|---|
| 1968 | 84 | — |
| 1975 | 85 | +0.17% |
| 1982 | 84 | −0.17% |
| 1990 | 84 | +0.00% |
| 1999 | 79 | −0.68% |
| 2007 | 91 | +1.78% |
| 2012 | 101 | +2.11% |
| 2017 | 96 | −1.01% |
| 2023 | 87 | −1.63% |
Source: INSEE

== See also ==
- Communes of the Doubs department
