= Hyémondans =

- Commune
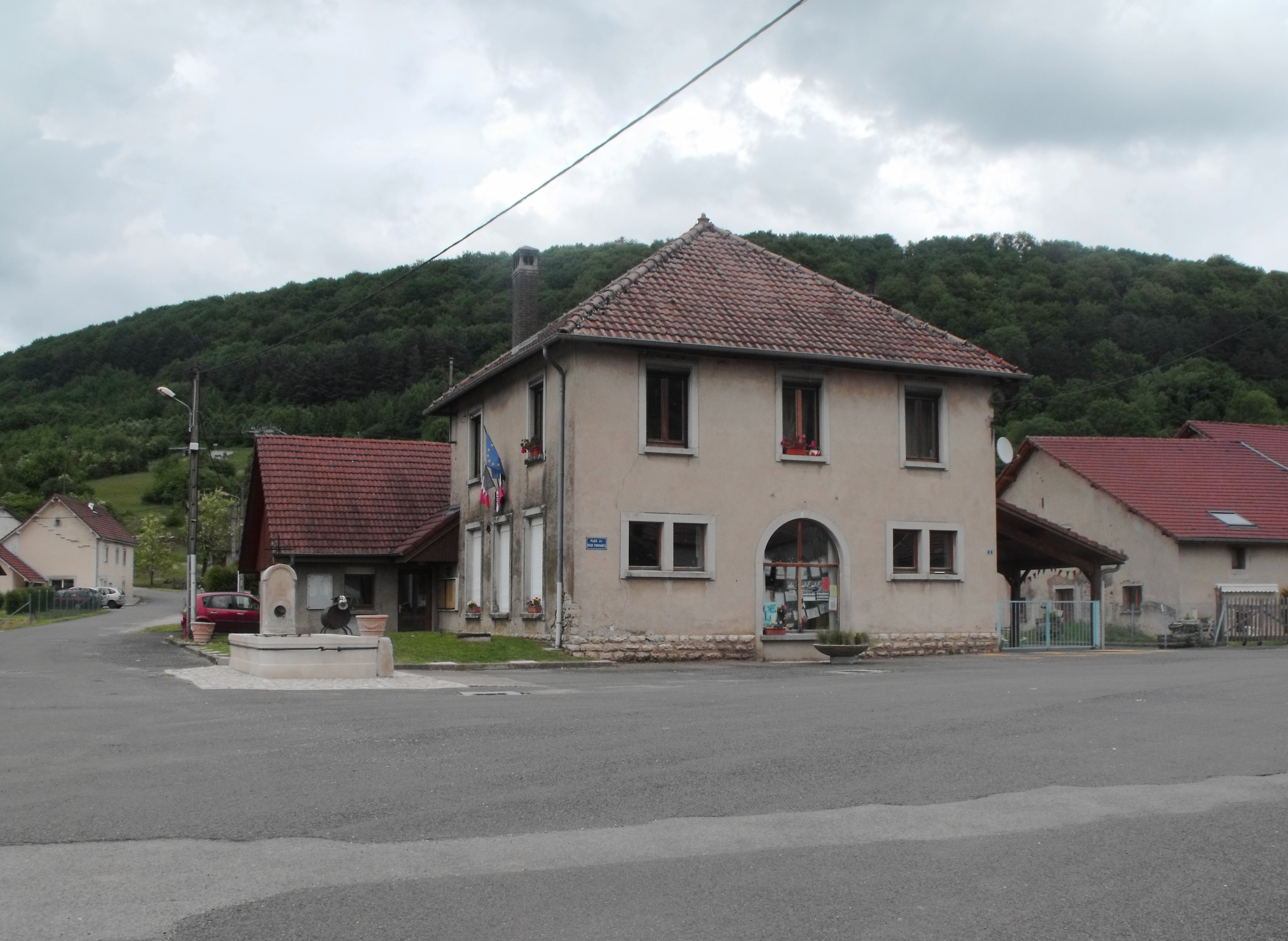
- The town hall in Hyémondans

- Coat of arms
- Location of Hyémondans
- Location within France Location within Bourgogne-Franche-Comté
- Coordinates: 47°23′18″N 6°39′00″E
- Country: France
- Region: Bourgogne-Franche-Comté
- Department: Doubs
- Arrondissement: Montbéliard
- Canton: Bavans
- Intercommunality: Deux Vallées Vertes

Government
  - Mayor (2020–2026): Benoît Cuenot
- Area^{1}: 6.87 km^{2} (2.65 sq mi)
- Highest elevation: 821 m (2,694 ft)
- Lowest elevation: 399 m (1,309 ft)
- Population (2023): 191
  - Density: 27.8/km^{2} (72.0/sq mi)
- Time zone: UTC+01:00 (CET)
  - Summer (DST): UTC+02:00 (CEST)
- INSEE/Postal code: 25311 /25250
- ^{1} French Land Register data, which excludes lakes, ponds, glaciers > 1 km^{2} (0.386 sq mi or 247 acres) and river estuaries.

Hyémondans (French pronunciation: [jemɔ̃dɑ̃]) is a commune in the Doubs department in the Bourgogne-Franche-Comté region in eastern France.

== Population ==
Historical population
Year	Pop.	±% p.a.
1968	104	—
1975	100	−0.56%
1982	148	+5.76%
1990	151	+0.25%
1999	139	−0.92%
2007	185	+3.64%
2012	197	+1.26%
2017	201	+0.40%
2023	191	−0.85%
Source: INSEE

== See also ==
- Communes of the Doubs department
