= Crosey-le-Grand =

- Commune
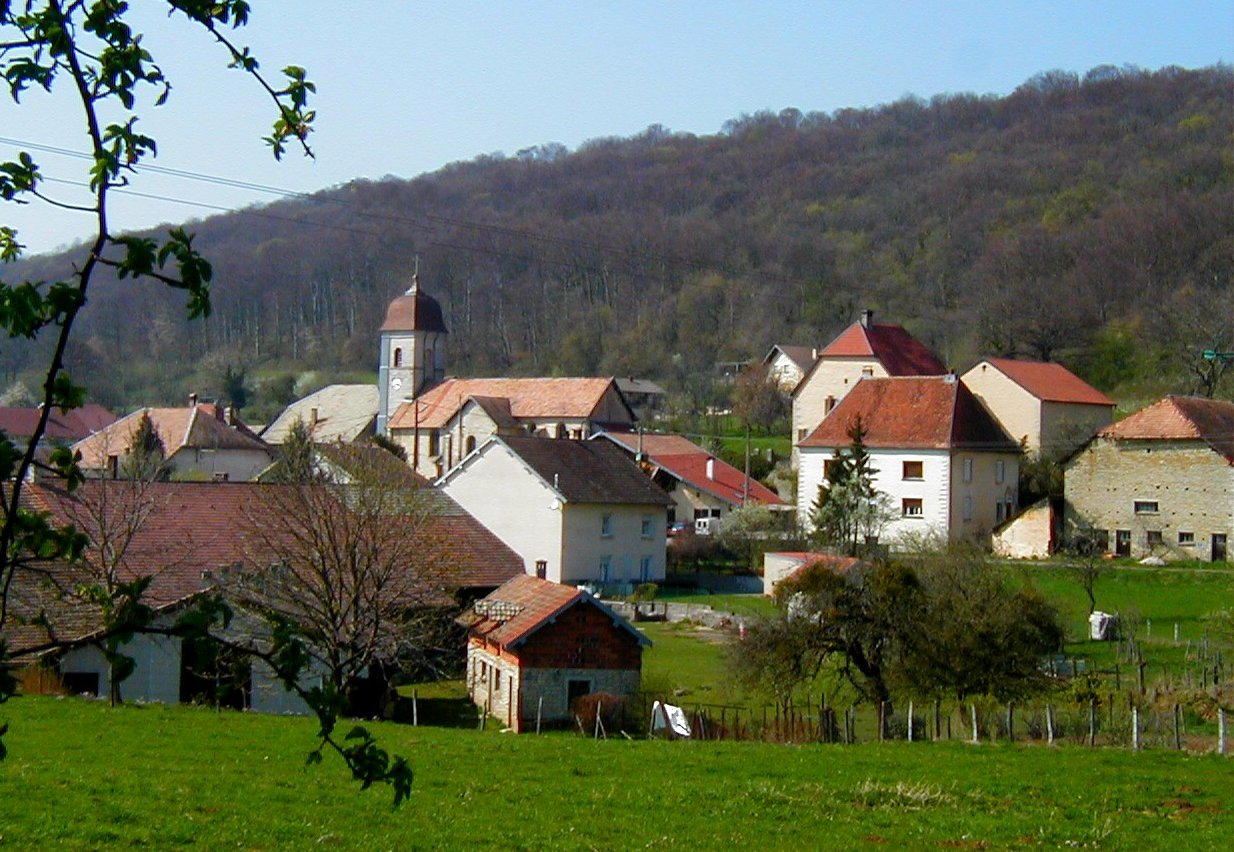
- A general view of Crosey-le-Grand

- Coat of arms
- Location of Crosey-le-Grand
- Location within France Location within Bourgogne-Franche-Comté
- Coordinates: 47°21′23″N 6°31′33″E
- Country: France
- Region: Bourgogne-Franche-Comté
- Department: Doubs
- Arrondissement: Montbéliard
- Canton: Bavans
- Intercommunality: Pays de Sancey-Belleherbe

Government
  - Mayor (2020–2026): Christian Telier
- Area^{1}: 10.28 km^{2} (3.97 sq mi)
- Highest elevation: 687 m (2,254 ft)
- Lowest elevation: 439 m (1,440 ft)
- Population (2023): 158
  - Density: 15.4/km^{2} (39.8/sq mi)
- Time zone: UTC+01:00 (CET)
  - Summer (DST): UTC+02:00 (CEST)
- INSEE/Postal code: 25177 /25340
- ^{1} French Land Register data, which excludes lakes, ponds, glaciers > 1 km^{2} (0.386 sq mi or 247 acres) and river estuaries.

Crosey-le-Grand (French pronunciation: [kʁozɛ lə ɡʁɑ̃]) is a commune in the Doubs department in the Bourgogne-Franche-Comté region in eastern France.

== Population ==
Historical population
| Year | Pop. | ±% p.a. |
|---|---|---|
| 1968 | 165 | — |
| 1975 | 154 | −0.98% |
| 1982 | 181 | +2.33% |
| 1990 | 150 | −2.32% |
| 1999 | 178 | +1.92% |
| 2007 | 175 | −0.21% |
| 2012 | 171 | −0.46% |
| 2017 | 152 | −2.33% |
| 2023 | 158 | +0.65% |
Source: INSEE

== See also ==
- Communes of the Doubs department
