= Valonne =

- Commune
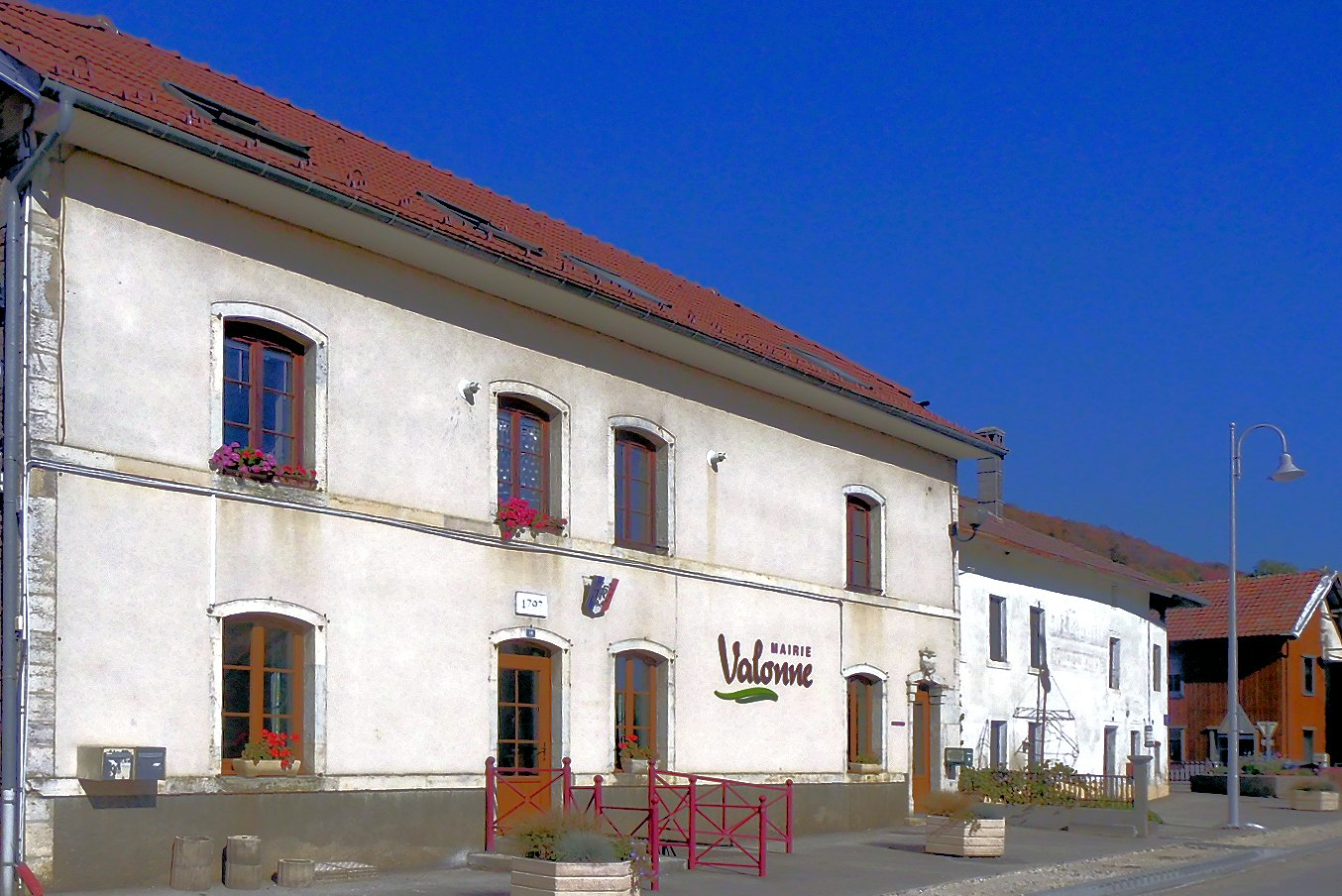
- The town hall in Valonne

- Coat of arms
- Location of Valonne
- Location within France Location within Bourgogne-Franche-Comté
- Coordinates: 47°20′38″N 6°39′34″E
- Country: France
- Region: Bourgogne-Franche-Comté
- Department: Doubs
- Arrondissement: Montbéliard
- Canton: Bavans

Government
  - Mayor (2020–2026): Michel Thievent
- Area^{1}: 8.33 km^{2} (3.22 sq mi)
- Highest elevation: 810 m (2,660 ft)
- Lowest elevation: 449 m (1,473 ft)
- Population (2023): 269
  - Density: 32.3/km^{2} (83.6/sq mi)
- Time zone: UTC+01:00 (CET)
  - Summer (DST): UTC+02:00 (CEST)
- INSEE/Postal code: 25583 /25190
- ^{1} French Land Register data, which excludes lakes, ponds, glaciers > 1 km^{2} (0.386 sq mi or 247 acres) and river estuaries.

Valonne (French pronunciation: [valɔn]) is a commune in the Doubs department in the Bourgogne-Franche-Comté region in eastern France.

== Geography ==
Valonne lies 15 km (9.3 mi) from Pont-de-Roide. On the south is the valley of the Barbèche, and on the north the massif of Lomont, which rises to 850 m. From the heights, there is a splendid view toward the department of Haute-Saône, the Vosges Mountains, the Pays de Montbéliard, and Alsace. In the other direction, one can see the Jura Mountains, and on a clear day, the Alps.

== Population ==
Historical population
Year	Pop.	±% p.a.
1968	165	—
1975	161	−0.35%
1982	171	+0.86%
1990	172	+0.07%
1999	179	+0.44%
2007	215	+2.32%
2012	242	+2.39%
2017	244	+0.16%
2023	269	+1.64%
Source: INSEE

== See also ==
- Communes of the Doubs department
