= Bournois =

- Commune
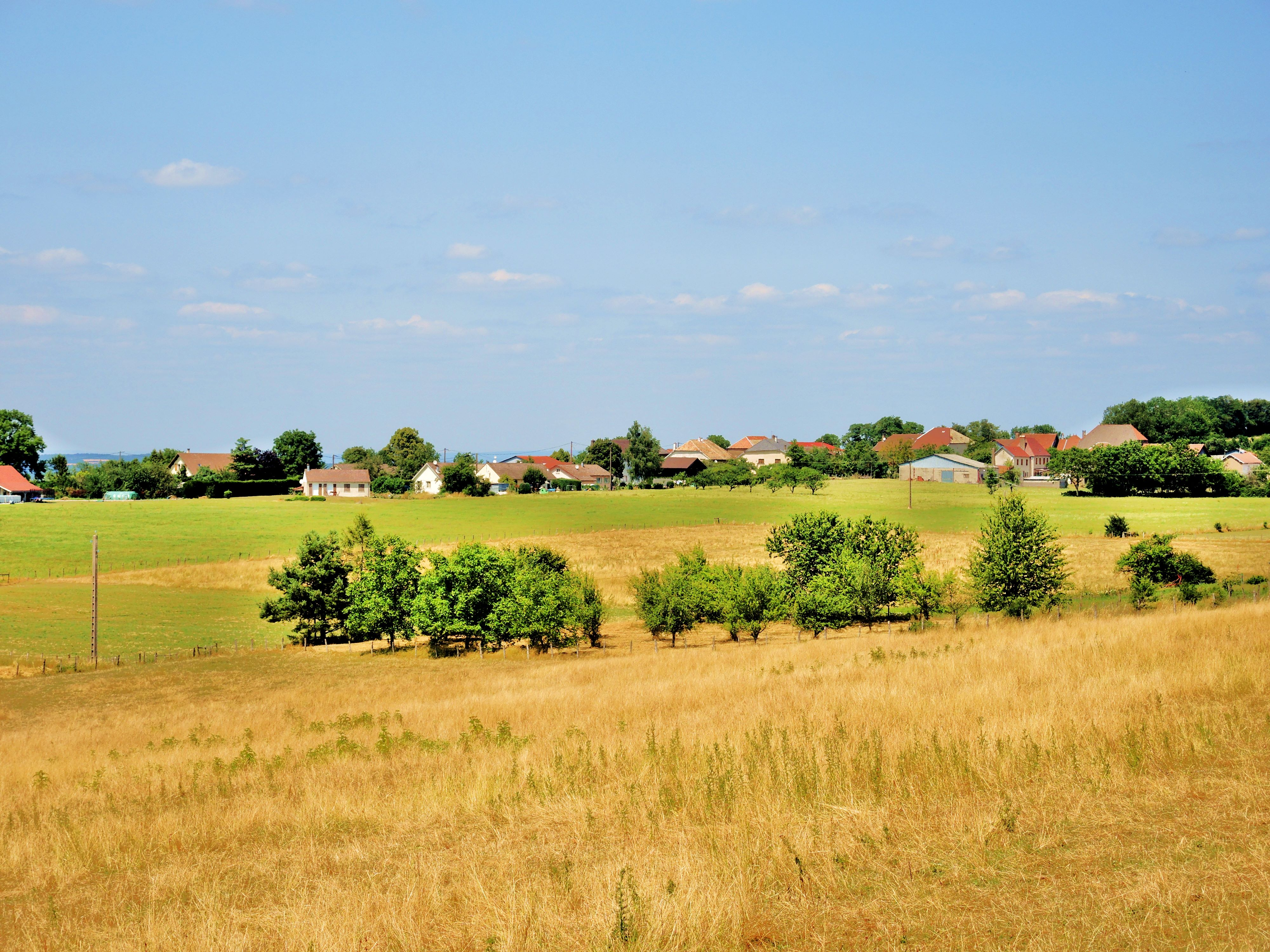
- A general view of Bournois
- Location of Bournois
- Location within France Location within Bourgogne-Franche-Comté
- Coordinates: 47°29′58″N 6°29′52″E
- Country: France
- Region: Bourgogne-Franche-Comté
- Department: Doubs
- Arrondissement: Montbéliard
- Canton: Bavans

Government
  - Mayor (2020–2026): Raymond Boby
- Area^{1}: 10.48 km^{2} (4.05 sq mi)
- Highest elevation: 521 m (1,709 ft)
- Lowest elevation: 330 m (1,080 ft)
- Population (2023): 188
  - Density: 17.9/km^{2} (46.5/sq mi)
- Time zone: UTC+01:00 (CET)
  - Summer (DST): UTC+02:00 (CEST)
- INSEE/Postal code: 25083 /25250
- ^{1} French Land Register data, which excludes lakes, ponds, glaciers > 1 km^{2} (0.386 sq mi or 247 acres) and river estuaries.

Bournois (French pronunciation: [buʁnwa]) is a commune in the Doubs department in the Bourgogne-Franche-Comté region in eastern France.

== Population ==
Historical population
Year	Pop.	±% p.a.
1968	177	—
1975	177	+0.00%
1982	208	+2.33%
1990	212	+0.24%
1999	209	−0.16%
2007	180	−1.85%
2012	190	+1.09%
2017	192	+0.21%
2023	188	−0.35%
Source: INSEE

== See also ==
- Communes of the Doubs department

== Notable people ==
- Louis-Marie Aubert du Petit-Thouars (1758–1831), botanist, born in Bournois
