= Canton of Bavans =

Coordinates: 47.49°N 6.73°E

The canton of Bavans is an administrative division of the Doubs department, eastern France. It was created at the French canton reorganisation which came into effect in March 2015. Its seat is in Bavans.

It consists of the following communes:

1. Accolans
2. Aibre
3. Allondans
4. Anteuil
5. Appenans
6. Arcey
7. Bavans
8. Belvoir
9. Berche
10. Beutal
11. Blussangeaux
12. Blussans
13. Bournois
14. Branne
15. Bretigney
16. Chazot
17. Colombier-Fontaine
18. Crosey-le-Grand
19. Crosey-le-Petit
20. Dampierre-sur-le-Doubs
21. Désandans
22. Dung
23. Échenans
24. Étouvans
25. Étrappe
26. Faimbe
27. Fontaine-lès-Clerval
28. Gémonval
29. Geney
30. L'Hôpital-Saint-Lieffroy
31. Hyémondans
32. L'Isle-sur-le-Doubs
33. Issans
34. Laire
35. Lanans
36. Lanthenans
37. Longevelle-sur-Doubs
38. Lougres
39. Mancenans
40. Marvelise
41. Médière
42. Montenois
43. Onans
44. Orve
45. Pays-de-Clerval
46. Pompierre-sur-Doubs
47. Présentevillers
48. La Prétière
49. Rahon
50. Randevillers
51. Rang
52. Raynans
53. Roche-lès-Clerval
54. Sainte-Marie
55. Saint-Georges-Armont
56. Saint-Julien-lès-Montbéliard
57. Saint-Maurice-Colombier
58. Sancey
59. Semondans
60. Servin
61. Sourans
62. Soye
63. Surmont
64. Valonne
65. Vaudrivillers
66. Vellerot-lès-Belvoir
67. Vellevans
68. Vernois-lès-Belvoir
69. Le Vernoy
70. Villars-sous-Écot
71. Vyt-lès-Belvoir
