= Blussans =

- Commune
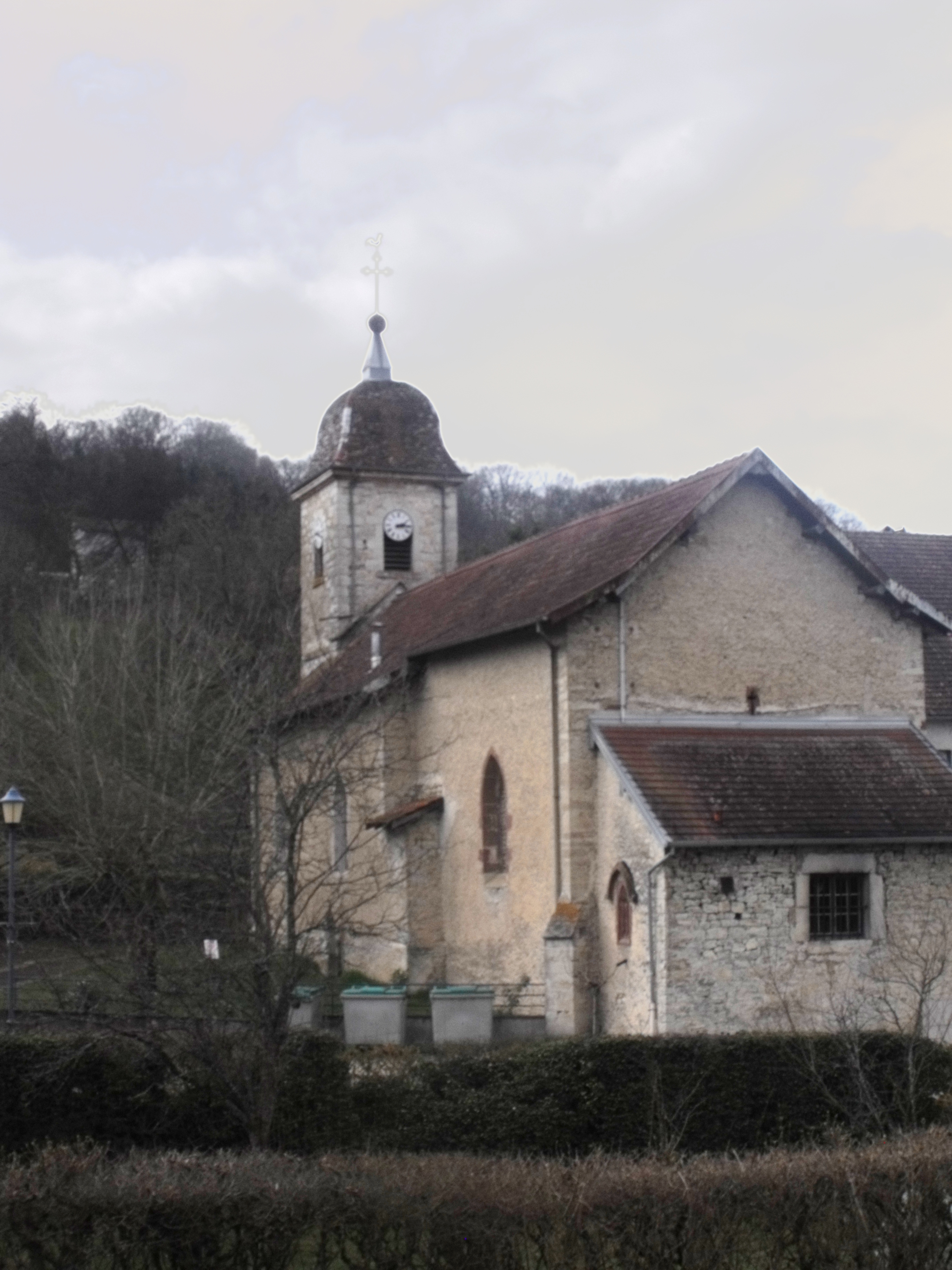
- The church in Blussans

- Coat of arms
- Location of Blussans
- Location within France Location within Bourgogne-Franche-Comté
- Coordinates: 47°25′42″N 6°36′29″E
- Country: France
- Region: Bourgogne-Franche-Comté
- Department: Doubs
- Arrondissement: Montbéliard
- Canton: Bavans

Government
  - Mayor (2020–2026): Marc-André Dodivers
- Area^{1}: 8.04 km^{2} (3.10 sq mi)
- Highest elevation: 482 m (1,581 ft)
- Lowest elevation: 290 m (950 ft)
- Population (2023): 187
  - Density: 23.3/km^{2} (60.2/sq mi)
- Time zone: UTC+01:00 (CET)
  - Summer (DST): UTC+02:00 (CEST)
- INSEE/Postal code: 25067 /25250
- ^{1} French Land Register data, which excludes lakes, ponds, glaciers > 1 km^{2} (0.386 sq mi or 247 acres) and river estuaries.

Blussans (French pronunciation: [blysɑ̃]) is a commune in the Doubs department in the Bourgogne-Franche-Comté region in eastern France.

== Population ==
Historical population
Year	Pop.	±% p.a.
1968	195	—
1975	197	+0.15%
1982	221	+1.66%
1990	193	−1.68%
1999	176	−1.02%
2007	186	+0.69%
2012	194	+0.85%
2017	194	+0.00%
2023	187	−0.61%
Source: INSEE

== See also ==
- Communes of the Doubs department
