= Servin =

- Commune
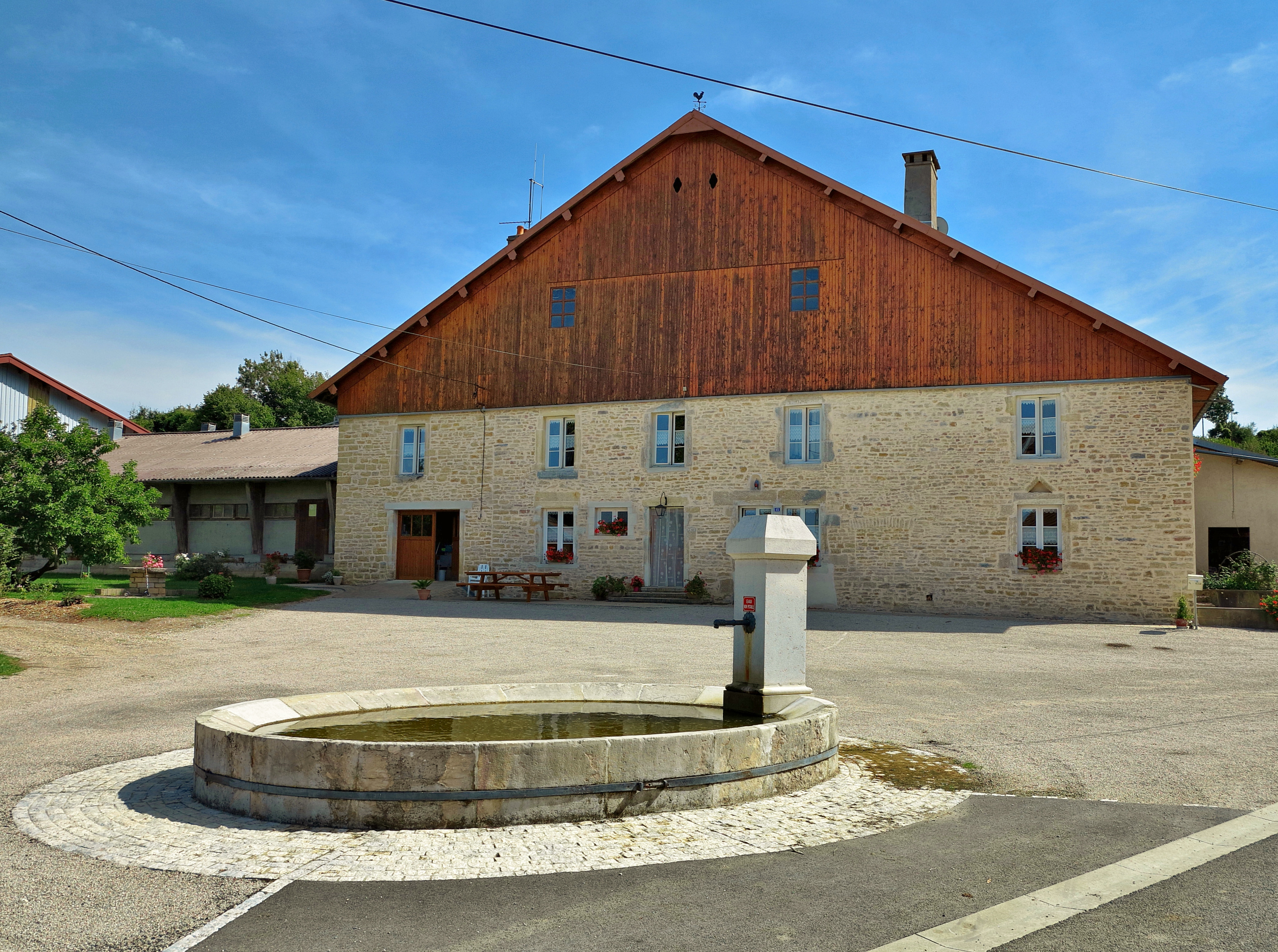
- A farm in Servin
- Location of Servin
- Location within France Location within Bourgogne-Franche-Comté
- Coordinates: 47°18′30″N 6°27′49″E
- Country: France
- Region: Bourgogne-Franche-Comté
- Department: Doubs
- Arrondissement: Besançon
- Canton: Bavans

Government
  - Mayor (2021–2026): Frédéric André
- Area^{1}: 10.03 km^{2} (3.87 sq mi)
- Highest elevation: 710 m (2,330 ft)
- Lowest elevation: 378 m (1,240 ft)
- Population (2023): 195
  - Density: 19.4/km^{2} (50.4/sq mi)
- Time zone: UTC+01:00 (CET)
  - Summer (DST): UTC+02:00 (CEST)
- INSEE/Postal code: 25544 /25430
- ^{1} French Land Register data, which excludes lakes, ponds, glaciers > 1 km^{2} (0.386 sq mi or 247 acres) and river estuaries.

Servin (French pronunciation: [sɛʁvɛ̃]) is a commune in the Doubs department in the Bourgogne-Franche-Comté region in eastern France.

== Geography ==
Servin lies 18 km (11 mi) southeast of Baume-les-Dames on the Roman road from Besançon to the Rhine.

== Population ==
Historical population
Year	Pop.	±% p.a.
1968	148	—
1975	144	−0.39%
1982	149	+0.49%
1990	151	+0.17%
1999	164	+0.92%
2007	177	+0.96%
2012	188	+1.21%
2017	202	+1.45%
2023	195	−0.59%
Source: INSEE

== See also ==
- Communes of the Doubs department
