= Fontaine-lès-Clerval =

- Commune
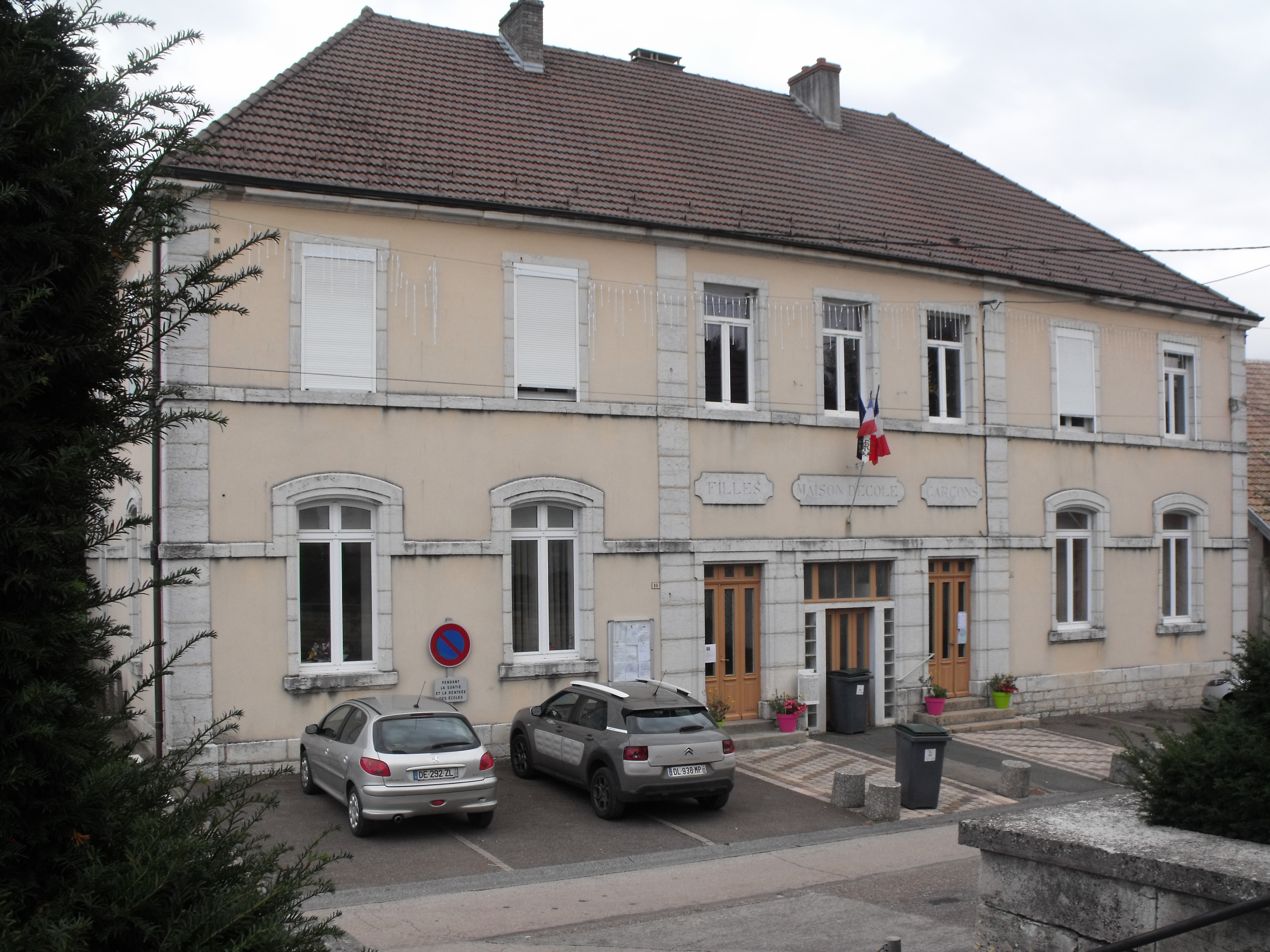
- The town hall in Fontaine-lès-Clerval
- Location of Fontaine-lès-Clerval
- Location within France Location within Bourgogne-Franche-Comté
- Coordinates: 47°25′34″N 6°28′20″E
- Country: France
- Region: Bourgogne-Franche-Comté
- Department: Doubs
- Arrondissement: Montbéliard
- Canton: Bavans

Government
  - Mayor (2022–2026): Michel Euvrard
- Area^{1}: 11.5 km^{2} (4.4 sq mi)
- Highest elevation: 462 m (1,516 ft)
- Lowest elevation: 320 m (1,050 ft)
- Population (2023): 253
  - Density: 22.0/km^{2} (57.0/sq mi)
- Time zone: UTC+01:00 (CET)
  - Summer (DST): UTC+02:00 (CEST)
- INSEE/Postal code: 25246 /25340
- ^{1} French Land Register data, which excludes lakes, ponds, glaciers > 1 km^{2} (0.386 sq mi or 247 acres) and river estuaries.

Fontaine-lès-Clerval (French pronunciation: [fɔ̃tɛn lɛ klɛʁval], literally Fontaine near Clerval) is a commune in the Doubs department in the Bourgogne-Franche-Comté region in eastern France.

== Population ==
Historical population
Year	Pop.	±% p.a.
1968	288	—
1975	304	+0.78%
1982	301	−0.14%
1990	256	−2.00%
1999	242	−0.62%
2007	236	−0.31%
2012	260	+1.96%
2017	299	+2.83%
2023	253	−2.75%
Source: INSEE

== See also ==
- Clerval
- Communes of the Doubs department
