= Pompierre-sur-Doubs =

- Commune
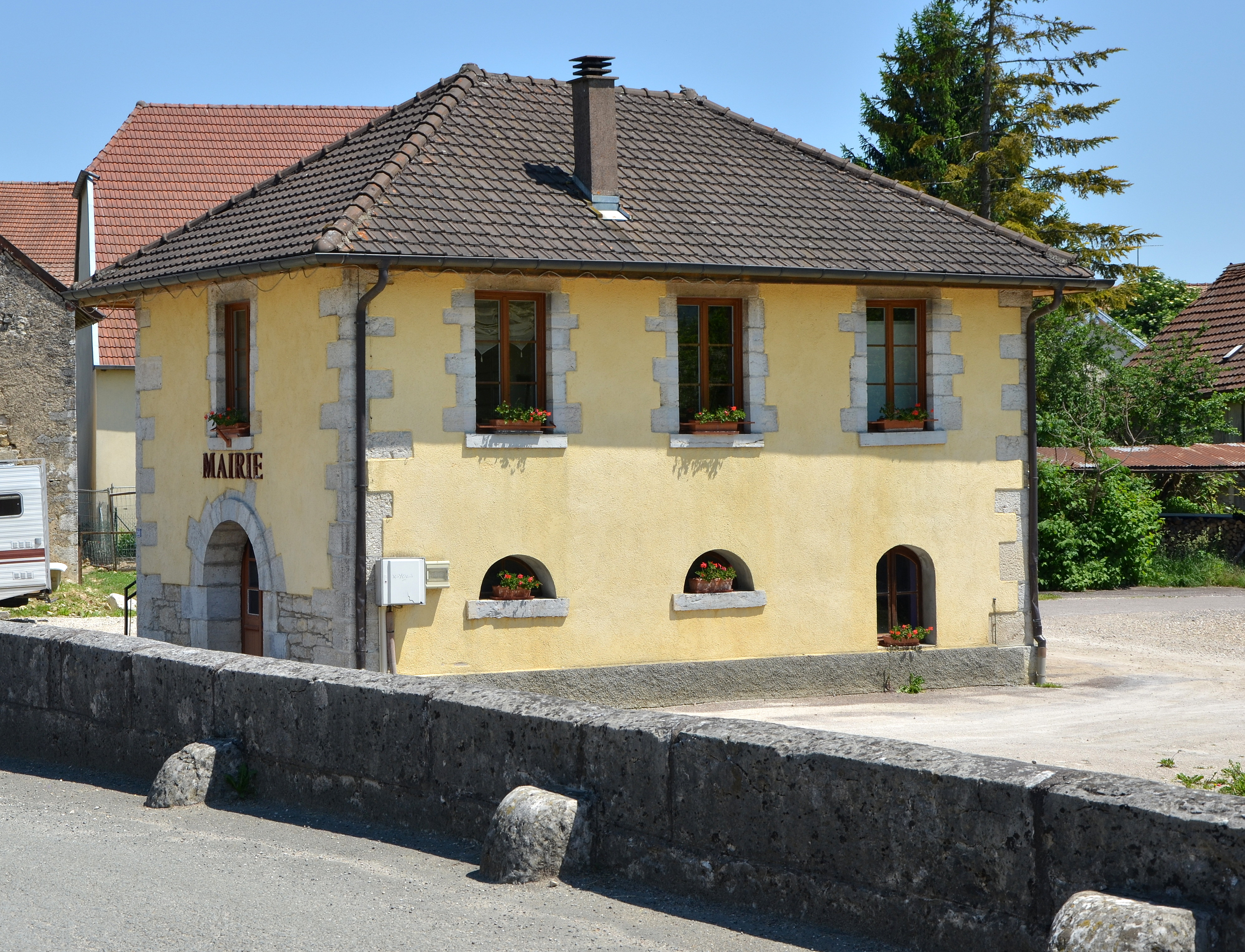
- Town hall
- Location of Pompierre-sur-Doubs
- Location within France Location within Bourgogne-Franche-Comté
- Coordinates: 47°25′10″N 6°31′29″E
- Country: France
- Region: Bourgogne-Franche-Comté
- Department: Doubs
- Arrondissement: Montbéliard
- Canton: Bavans

Government
  - Mayor (2020–2026): Marie-Pierre Vernay
- Area^{1}: 8.16 km^{2} (3.15 sq mi)
- Highest elevation: 393 m (1,289 ft)
- Lowest elevation: 275 m (902 ft)
- Population (2023): 300
  - Density: 37/km^{2} (95/sq mi)
- Time zone: UTC+01:00 (CET)
  - Summer (DST): UTC+02:00 (CEST)
- INSEE/Postal code: 25461 /25340
- ^{1} French Land Register data, which excludes lakes, ponds, glaciers > 1 km^{2} (0.386 sq mi or 247 acres) and river estuaries.

Pompierre-sur-Doubs (French pronunciation: [pɔ̃pjɛʁ syʁ du], literally Pompierre on Doubs) is a commune in the Doubs department in the Bourgogne-Franche-Comté region in eastern France.

== Population ==
Historical population
| Year | Pop. | ±% p.a. |
|---|---|---|
| 1968 | 303 | — |
| 1975 | 311 | +0.37% |
| 1982 | 258 | −2.63% |
| 1990 | 244 | −0.69% |
| 1999 | 273 | +1.26% |
| 2007 | 320 | +2.01% |
| 2012 | 303 | −1.09% |
| 2017 | 307 | +0.26% |
| 2023 | 300 | −0.38% |
Source: INSEE

== See also ==
- Doubs (river)
- Communes of the Doubs department
