= Berche =

- Commune
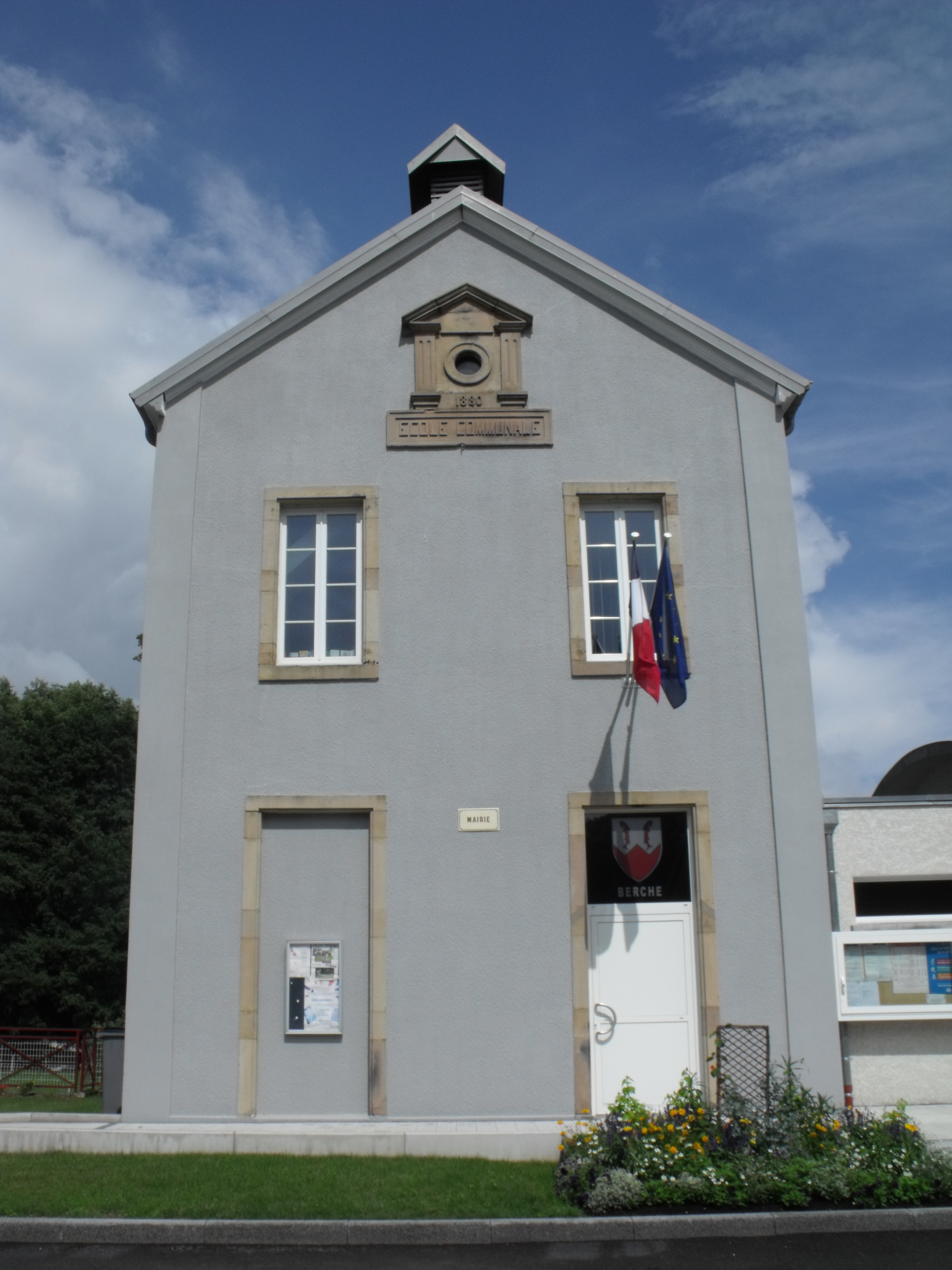
- The town hall in Berche

- Coat of arms
- Location of Berche
- Location within France Location within Bourgogne-Franche-Comté
- Coordinates: 47°28′24″N 6°44′33″E
- Country: France
- Region: Bourgogne-Franche-Comté
- Department: Doubs
- Arrondissement: Montbéliard
- Canton: Bavans
- Intercommunality: Pays de Montbéliard Agglomération

Government
  - Mayor (2020–2026): Jean-Luc Petiot
- Area^{1}: 3.11 km^{2} (1.20 sq mi)
- Highest elevation: 448 m (1,470 ft)
- Lowest elevation: 305 m (1,001 ft)
- Population (2023): 534
  - Density: 172/km^{2} (445/sq mi)
- Time zone: UTC+01:00 (CET)
  - Summer (DST): UTC+02:00 (CEST)
- INSEE/Postal code: 25054 /25420
- ^{1} French Land Register data, which excludes lakes, ponds, glaciers > 1 km^{2} (0.386 sq mi or 247 acres) and river estuaries.

Berche (French pronunciation: [bɛʁʃ]) is a commune in the Doubs department in the Bourgogne-Franche-Comté region in eastern France.

== Population ==
Historical population
Year	Pop.	±% p.a.
1968	184	—
1975	266	+5.41%
1982	367	+4.71%
1990	489	+3.65%
1999	428	−1.47%
2007	432	+0.12%
2012	470	+1.70%
2017	495	+1.04%
2023	534	+1.27%
Source: INSEE

== See also ==
- Communes of the Doubs department
