= Vellevans =

- Commune
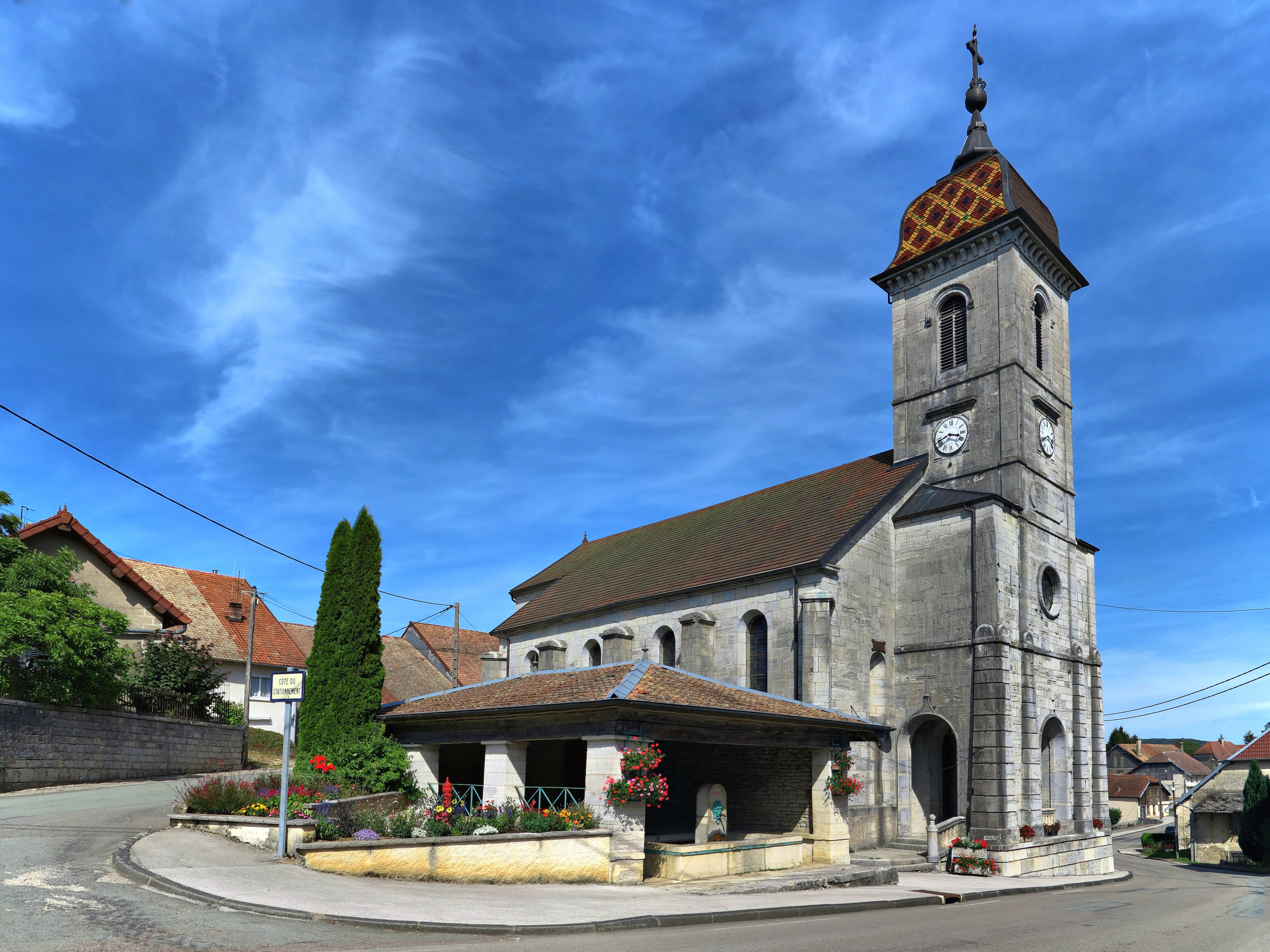
- The church and wash house in Vellevans
- Location of Vellevans
- Location within France Location within Bourgogne-Franche-Comté
- Coordinates: 47°18′41″N 6°29′58″E
- Country: France
- Region: Bourgogne-Franche-Comté
- Department: Doubs
- Arrondissement: Montbéliard
- Canton: Bavans

Government
  - Mayor (2020–2026): Gérard Dutrieux
- Area^{1}: 13.54 km^{2} (5.23 sq mi)
- Highest elevation: 733 m (2,405 ft)
- Lowest elevation: 392 m (1,286 ft)
- Population (2023): 253
  - Density: 18.7/km^{2} (48.4/sq mi)
- Time zone: UTC+01:00 (CET)
  - Summer (DST): UTC+02:00 (CEST)
- INSEE/Postal code: 25597 /25430
- ^{1} French Land Register data, which excludes lakes, ponds, glaciers > 1 km^{2} (0.386 sq mi or 247 acres) and river estuaries.

Vellevans (French pronunciation: [vɛlvɑ̃]) is a commune in the Doubs department in the Bourgogne-Franche-Comté region in eastern France.

== Population ==
Historical population
Year	Pop.	±% p.a.
1968	264	—
1975	227	−2.13%
1982	222	−0.32%
1990	207	−0.87%
1999	218	+0.58%
2007	194	−1.45%
2012	192	−0.21%
2017	234	+4.04%
2023	253	+1.31%
Source: INSEE

== See also ==
- Communes of the Doubs department
