= Anteuil =

- Commune
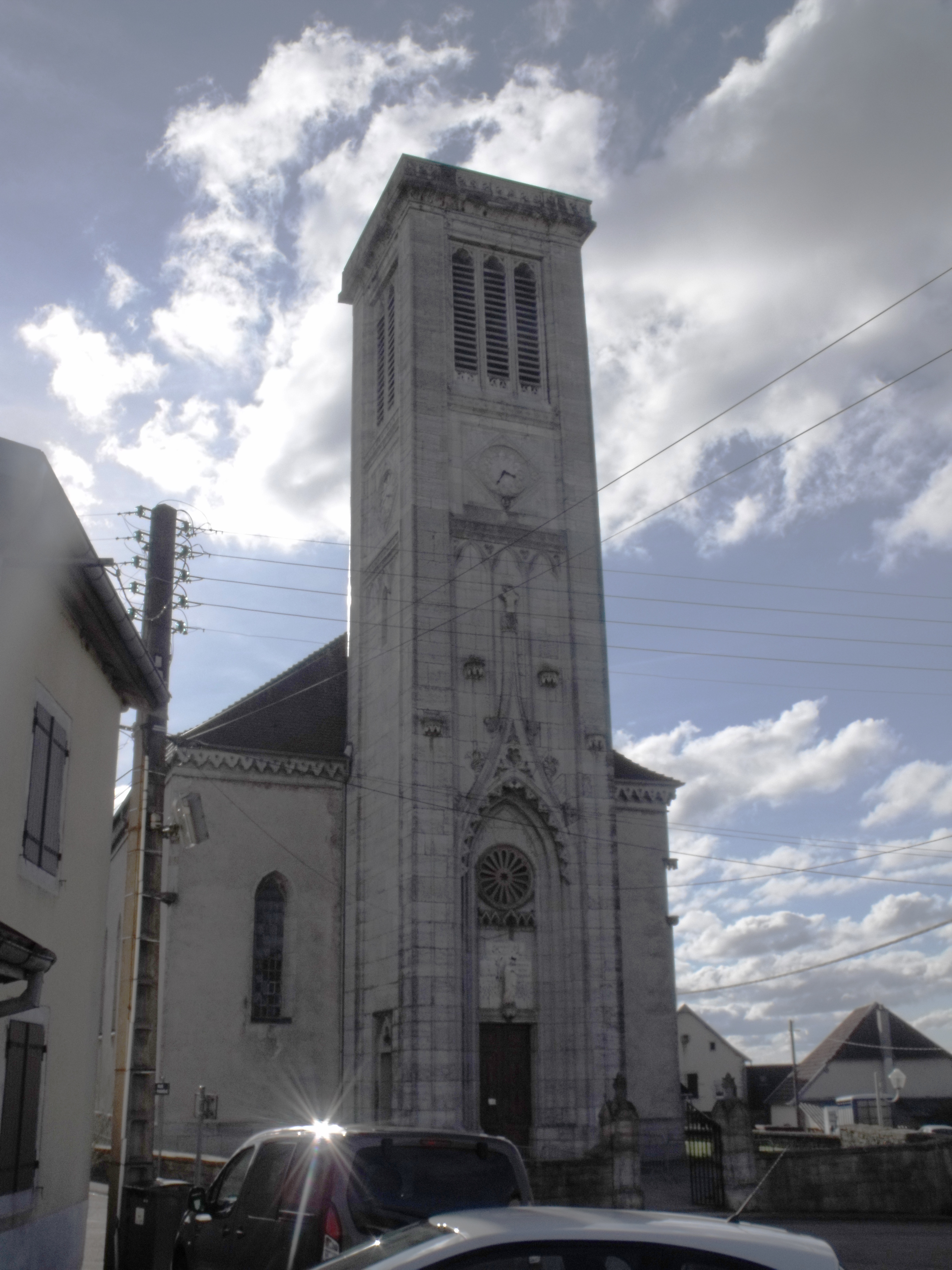
- The church in Anteuil

- Coat of arms
- Location of Anteuil
- Location within France Location within Bourgogne-Franche-Comté
- Coordinates: 47°23′18″N 6°33′41″E
- Country: France
- Region: Bourgogne-Franche-Comté
- Department: Doubs
- Arrondissement: Montbéliard
- Canton: Bavans

Government
  - Mayor (2020–2026): Gérard Jouillerot
- Area^{1}: 24.29 km^{2} (9.38 sq mi)
- Highest elevation: 836 m (2,743 ft)
- Lowest elevation: 360 m (1,180 ft)
- Population (2023): 602
  - Density: 24.8/km^{2} (64.2/sq mi)
- Time zone: UTC+01:00 (CET)
  - Summer (DST): UTC+02:00 (CEST)
- INSEE/Postal code: 25018 /25340
- ^{1} French Land Register data, which excludes lakes, ponds, glaciers > 1 km^{2} (0.386 sq mi or 247 acres) and river estuaries.

Anteuil (French pronunciation: [ɑ̃tœj]) is a commune in the Doubs department in the Bourgogne-Franche-Comté region in eastern France. In January 1973 it absorbed the former communes Glainans and Tournedoz.

== Population ==
Historical population
| Year | Pop. | ±% p.a. |
|---|---|---|
| 1968 | 422 | — |
| 1975 | 385 | −1.30% |
| 1982 | 524 | +4.50% |
| 1990 | 506 | −0.44% |
| 1999 | 482 | −0.54% |
| 2007 | 540 | +1.43% |
| 2012 | 652 | +3.84% |
| 2017 | 652 | +0.00% |
| 2023 | 602 | −1.32% |
Source: INSEE

== See also ==
- Communes of the Doubs department
