= Appenans =

- Commune
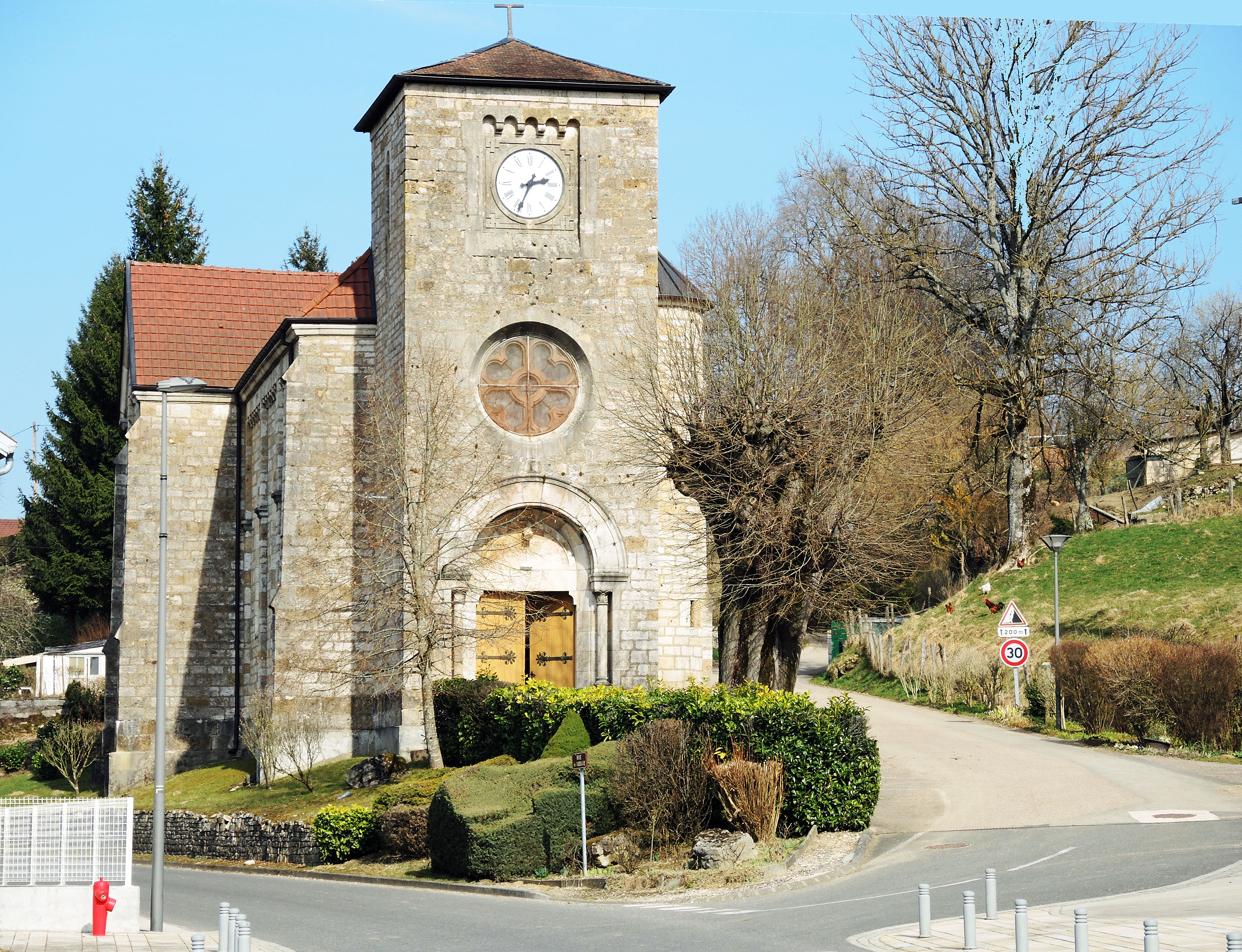
- The church in Appenans
- Location of Appenans
- Location within France Location within Bourgogne-Franche-Comté
- Coordinates: 47°26′37″N 6°33′56″E
- Country: France
- Region: Bourgogne-Franche-Comté
- Department: Doubs
- Arrondissement: Montbéliard
- Canton: Bavans

Government
  - Mayor (2020–2026): Cyril Simonin
- Area^{1}: 4.07 km^{2} (1.57 sq mi)
- Highest elevation: 400 m (1,300 ft)
- Lowest elevation: 284 m (932 ft)
- Population (2023): 385
  - Density: 94.6/km^{2} (245/sq mi)
- Time zone: UTC+01:00 (CET)
  - Summer (DST): UTC+02:00 (CEST)
- INSEE/Postal code: 25019 /25250
- ^{1} French Land Register data, which excludes lakes, ponds, glaciers > 1 km^{2} (0.386 sq mi or 247 acres) and river estuaries.

Appenans (French pronunciation: [apnɑ̃]) is a commune in the Doubs department in the Bourgogne-Franche-Comté region in eastern France.

== Population ==
Historical population
Year	Pop.	±% p.a.
1968	259	—
1975	286	+1.43%
1982	316	+1.44%
1990	357	+1.54%
1999	412	+1.60%
2007	415	+0.09%
2012	424	+0.43%
2017	376	−2.37%
2023	385	+0.40%
Source: INSEE

== See also ==
- Communes of the Doubs department
