= Orve =

- Commune
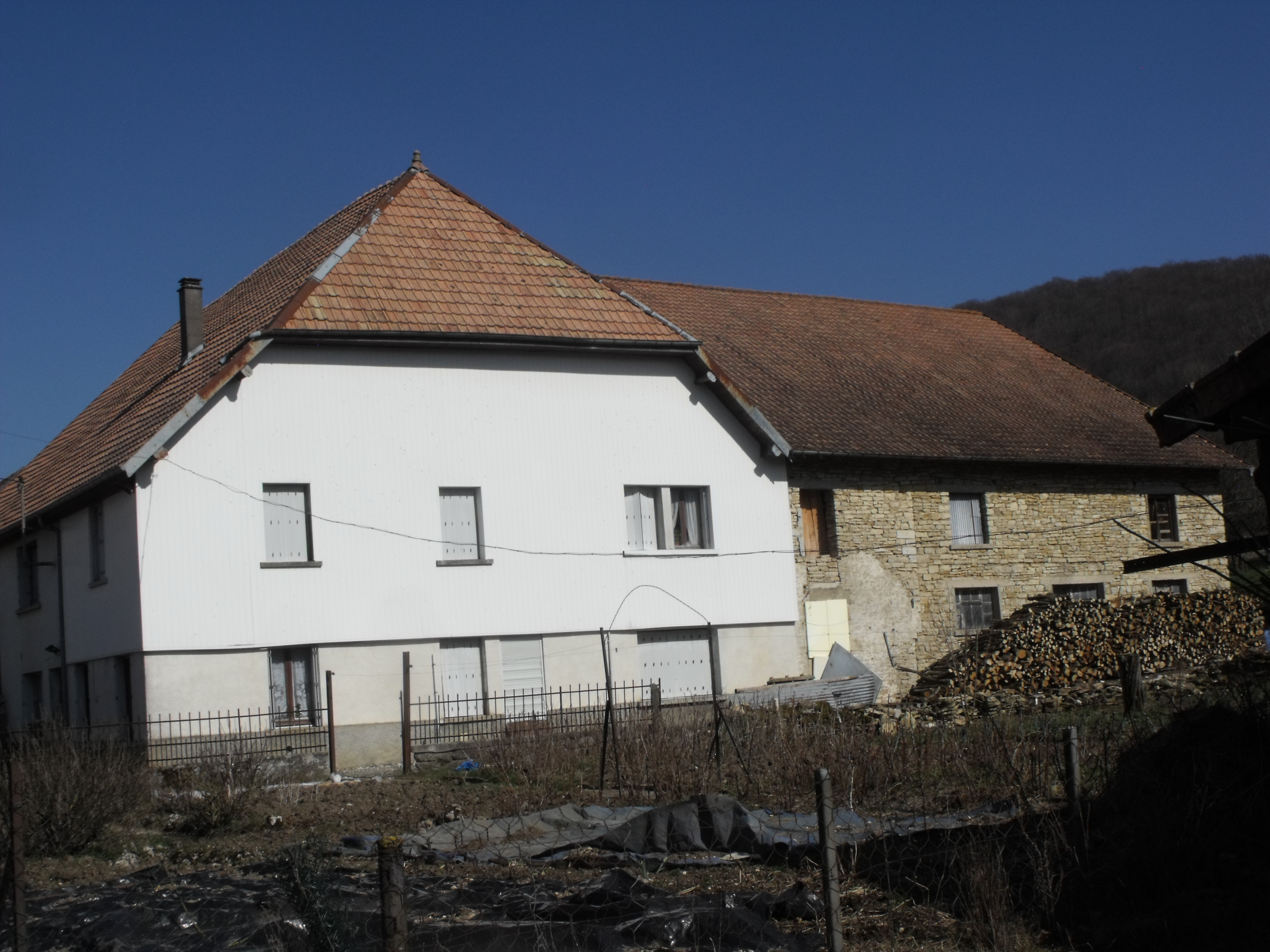
- A farm in Orve
- Location of Orve
- Location within France Location within Bourgogne-Franche-Comté
- Coordinates: 47°19′36″N 6°33′16″E
- Country: France
- Region: Bourgogne-Franche-Comté
- Department: Doubs
- Arrondissement: Montbéliard
- Canton: Bavans
- Intercommunality: Pays de Sancey-Belleherbe

Government
  - Mayor (2020–2026): Daniel Lagaisse
- Area^{1}: 5.51 km^{2} (2.13 sq mi)
- Highest elevation: 651 m (2,136 ft)
- Lowest elevation: 459 m (1,506 ft)
- Population (2023): 59
  - Density: 11/km^{2} (28/sq mi)
- Time zone: UTC+01:00 (CET)
  - Summer (DST): UTC+02:00 (CEST)
- INSEE/Postal code: 25436 /25430
- ^{1} French Land Register data, which excludes lakes, ponds, glaciers > 1 km^{2} (0.386 sq mi or 247 acres) and river estuaries.

Orve (French pronunciation: [ɔʁv]) is a commune in the Doubs department in the Bourgogne-Franche-Comté region in eastern France.

== Population ==
Historical population
Year	Pop.	±% p.a.
1968	69	—
1975	76	+1.39%
1982	69	−1.37%
1990	62	−1.33%
1999	54	−1.52%
2007	68	+2.92%
2012	69	+0.29%
2017	61	−2.43%
2023	59	−0.55%
Source: INSEE

== See also ==
- Communes of the Doubs department
