= Vyt-lès-Belvoir =

- Commune
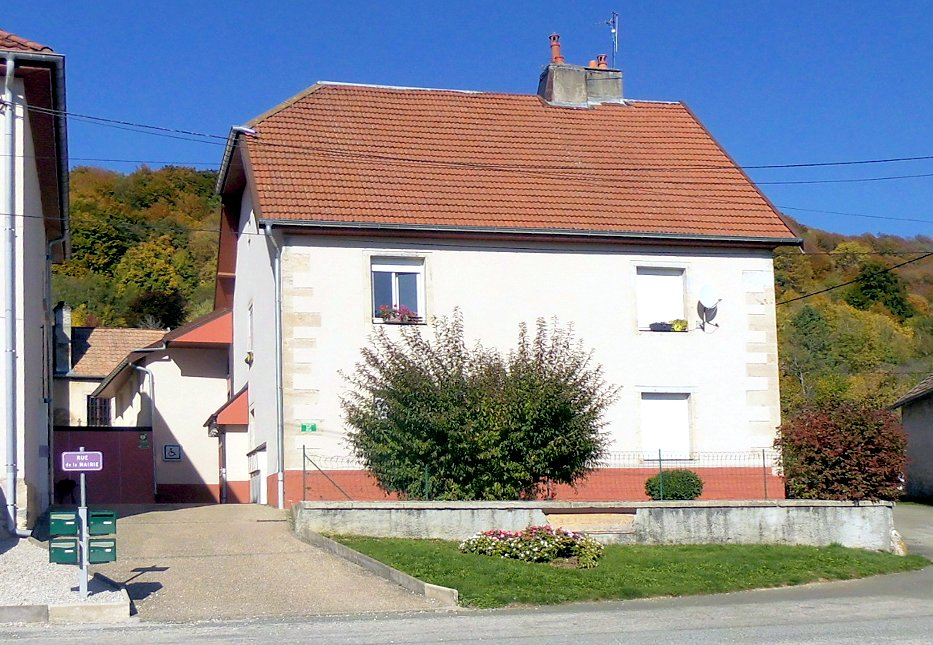
- Town hall

- Coat of arms
- Location of Vyt-lès-Belvoir
- Location within France Location within Bourgogne-Franche-Comté
- Coordinates: 47°20′57″N 6°37′21″E
- Country: France
- Region: Bourgogne-Franche-Comté
- Department: Doubs
- Arrondissement: Montbéliard
- Canton: Bavans
- Intercommunality: Pays de Sancey-Belleherbe

Government
  - Mayor (2020–2026): Lionel Torchio
- Area^{1}: 7.54 km^{2} (2.91 sq mi)
- Highest elevation: 845 m (2,772 ft)
- Lowest elevation: 516 m (1,693 ft)
- Population (2023): 179
  - Density: 23.7/km^{2} (61.5/sq mi)
- Time zone: UTC+01:00 (CET)
  - Summer (DST): UTC+02:00 (CEST)
- INSEE/Postal code: 25635 /25430
- ^{1} French Land Register data, which excludes lakes, ponds, glaciers > 1 km^{2} (0.386 sq mi or 247 acres) and river estuaries.

Vyt-lès-Belvoir (French pronunciation: [vi lɛ bɛlvwaʁ], literally: "Vyt near Belvoir") is a commune in the Doubs department in the Bourgogne-Franche-Comté region in eastern France.

== Population ==
Historical population
Year	Pop.	±% p.a.
1968	115	—
1975	124	+1.08%
1982	163	+3.98%
1990	145	−1.45%
1999	172	+1.92%
2007	174	+0.14%
2012	185	+1.23%
2017	188	+0.32%
2023	179	−0.81%
Source: INSEE

== See also ==
- Communes of the Doubs department
