= January 1910 Doubs river flood =

Natural disaster in France

Coordinates: 47.2399°N 6.0207°E

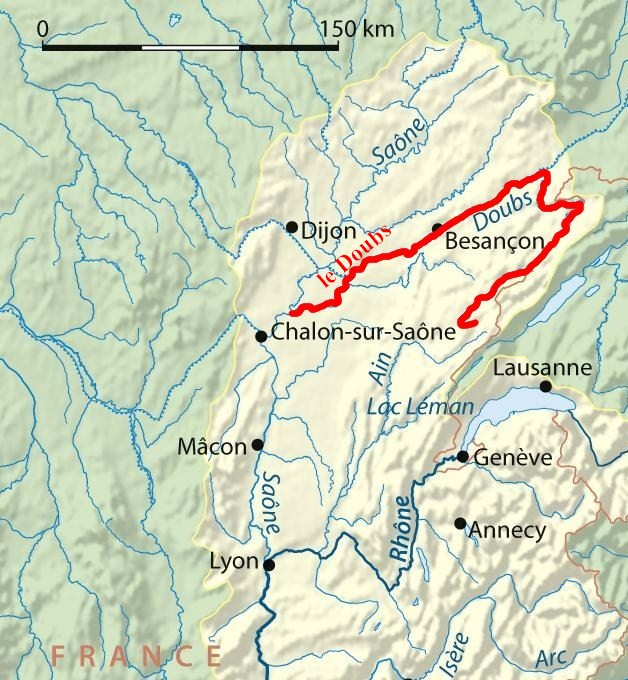
Location of Doubs river

The flood of Doubs river was the biggest flooding in the history of the Doubs river (France); the water rose up to nearly 10 metres above the usual level, January 21, 1910. The principal departements affected were the département of Doubs, the département of Jura and also the département of Saône et Loire. At least one person was killed, and many others may have been killed because of this flood.

== Causes ==
In the beginning of 1910, a lot of floods damaged France: the flood of Seine river in Île-de-France, in Chambéry, Troyes, Morez and lot of other French cities were affected and the ports of Marseille and Toulon where decimates by an historical tempest.

In Franche-Comté, the most probable causes of this flood where a heavy rainfall in the region since the previous month; the ground could not retain more water. Another cause accentuated the situation: the snow melted because the temperature was exceptionally warm.

== Cities and villages affected ==
The following list includes cities and villages officially damaged by the flood of the Doubs. The flood affected 112 cities or villages in Doubs, 33 in Jura, and 20 in Saône-et-Loire, so a total of 154 localities.

Municipalities of Doubs

- Abbans-Dessous
- Appenans
- Arbouans
- Arçon
- Audincourt
- Avanne-Aveney
- Bart
- Baume-les-Dames
- Bavans
- Berche
- Besançon
- Beure
- Bief
- Blussangeaux
- Blussans
- Bonnétage
- Bourguignon
- Boussières
- Branne
- Byans-sur-Doubs
- Chalèze
- Chalezeule
- Champlive
- Charmauvillers
- Charquemont
- Chaux-lès-Clerval
- Clerval
- Colombier-Fontaine
- Courcelles-lès-Montbéliard
- Dampierre-sur-le-Doubs
- Dampjoux
- Deluz
- Doubs
- Esnans
- Étouvans
- Fessevillers
- Fourbanne
- Fourcatier-et-Maison-Neuve
- Fournet-Blancheroche
- Gellin
- Glère
- Goumois
- Grand'Combe-Châteleu
- Grand'Combe-des-Bois
- Grandfontaine
- Hauterive-la-Fresse
- Hyèvre-Magny
- Hyèvre-Paroisse
- Indevillers
- Labergement-Sainte-Marie
- Laissey
- La Cluse-et-Mijoux
- La Longeville
- La Prétière
- Les Combes
- Les Fins
- Les Grangettes
- Les Villedieu
- Liebvillers
- L'Isle-sur-le-Doubs
- Longevelle-sur-Doubs
- Longevilles-Mont-d'Or
- Lougres
- Maisons-du-Bois-Lièvremont
- Malbuisson
- Mancenans
- Mandeure
- Mathay
- Médière
- Montancy
- Morteau
- Montbenoît
- Montfaucon
- Montferrand-le-Château
- Mouthe
- Montjoie-le-Château
- Montlebon
- Montperreux
- Noirefontaine
- Novillars
- Osselle
- Ougney-Douvot
- Oye-et-Pallet
- Pompierre-sur-Doubs
- Pont-de-Roide
- Rancenay
- Rang
- Roche-lès-Clerval
- Rochejean
- Roche-lez-Beaupré
- Roset-Fluans
- Routelle
- Saint-Georges-Armont
- Saint-Hippolyte
- Saint-Maurice-Colombier
- Saint-Point-Lac
- Saint-Vit
- Santoche
- Sarrageois
- Soulce-Cernay
- Thise
- Thoraise
- Torpes
- Vaire-Arcier
- Vaire-le-Petit
- Valentigney
- Vaufrey
- Villars-Saint-Georges
- Villars-sous-Dampjoux
- Ville-du-Pont
- Villers-le-Lac
- Voujeaucourt

Municipalities of Jura

- Annoire
- Asnans-Beauvoisin
- Audelange
- Baverans
- Brevans
- Champdivers
- Chaussin
- Chemin
- Choisey
- Crissey
- Dampierre
- Dole
- Éclans-Nenon
- Étrepigney
- Évans
- Falletans
- Fraisans
- Gevry
- Lavans-lès-Dole
- La Barre
- Longwy-sur-le-Doubs
- Molay
- Neublans-Abergement
- Orchamps
- Parcey
- Peseux
- Petit-Noir
- Rahon
- Ranchot
- Rans
- Rochefort-sur-Nenon
- Salans
- Villette-lès-Dole

Municipalities of Saône-et-Loire

- Authumes
- Charette
- Charnay-lès-Chalon
- Ciel
- Clux
- Fretterans
- Frontenard
- La Villeneuve
- Lays-sur-le-Doubs
- Les Bordes
- Longepierre
- Mont-lès-Seurre
- Navilly
- Pierre-de-Bresse
- Pontoux
- Pourlans
- Saunières
- Sermesse
- Varenne-sur-le-Doubs
- Verdun-sur-le-Doubs

== Besançon ==
The city of Besançon experienced severe flooding in its historic center and the Battant district. The Doubs river, which flows through the heart of the city in a distinctive loop formation, caused significant damage between January 18–21, 1910. Initially, residents and local authorities showed minimal concern despite awareness of exceptional water level rises downstream, operating under the assumption that the flood's magnitude could not exceed the previous record set during the 1882 Doubs flood.

On January 18, 1910, the Doubs river rose to nearly 7 meters above normal levels, reaching 8.68 meters on January 20. However, the situation dramatically worsened on Friday, January 21, 1910, at 3:00 AM, when the 1882 water level record was significantly exceeded. The flood peak reached 9.57 meters—72 centimeters higher than the previous record and nearly 10 meters above the usual level. In certain areas of the city, the inundation reached depths of over 1.5 meters.

The flood brought the city to a complete standstill. Public lighting was suspended, leaving residents without electricity and gas services. All bridges across the Doubs were closed to traffic, effectively cutting off transportation between different parts of the city. Commercial activities and administrative functions ceased entirely during the peak of the flooding.

As floodwaters receded by morning, they revealed extensive damage throughout Besançon. Streets had been carved with new ditches, buildings sustained severe structural damage, urban furniture was uprooted, and manufactured goods and everyday objects were scattered throughout the affected areas. The situation was described as chaotic and attracted significant media attention from both regional and national newspapers. Damage estimates exceeded two million French francs at the time, equivalent to approximately 6.5 million euros in contemporary currency.

Despite the extensive physical damage and disruption to city life, no fatalities were reported within Besançon or its immediate surroundings during the flood event.

=== Role of the Doubs in Besançon ===
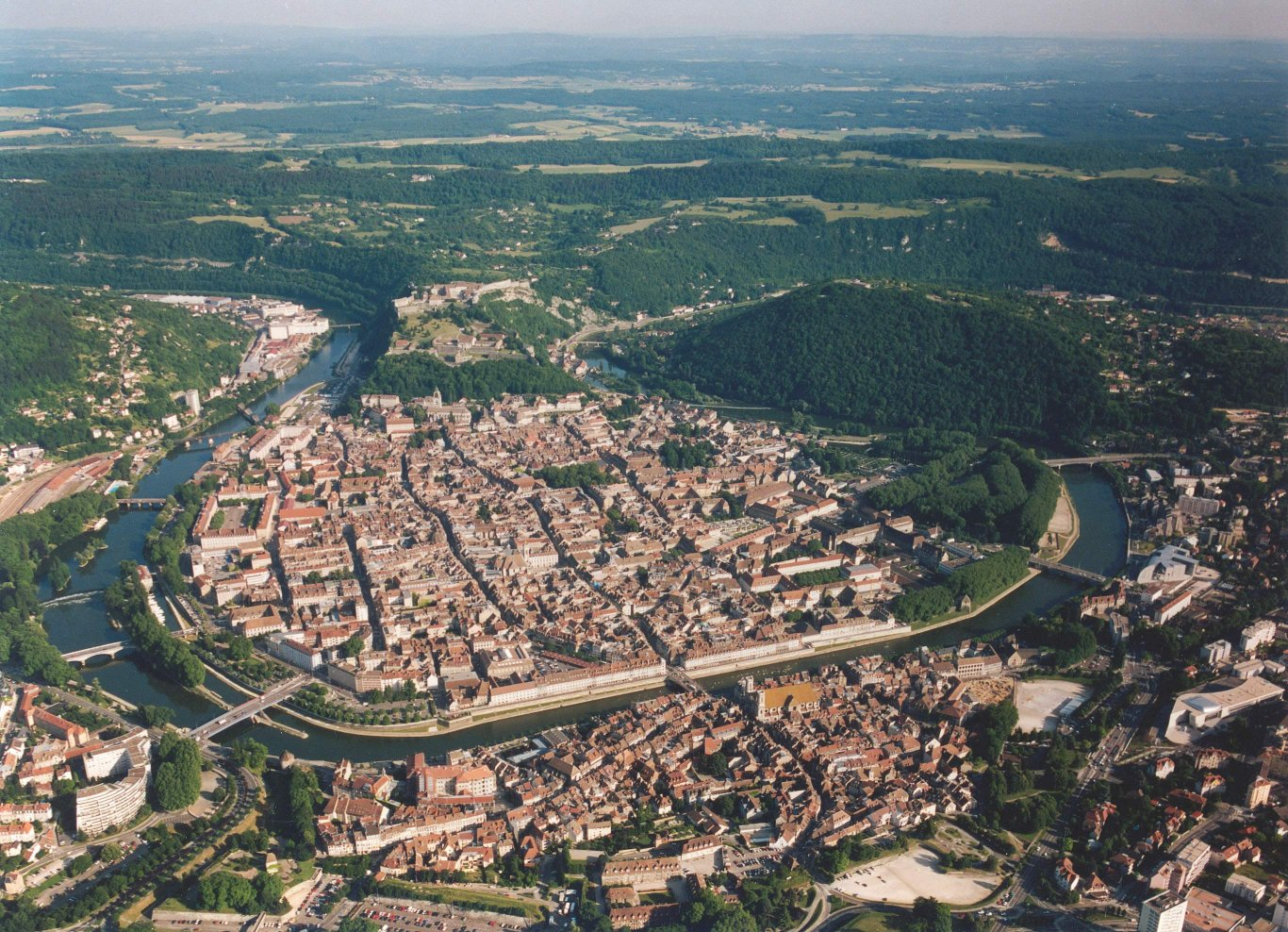
The historic heart surrounded by the Doubs River.

Besançon is situated within a significant meander of the Doubs, nearly a kilometer in diameter, which is sometimes compared to a peninsula, forming an almost perfect loop closed off and overlooked by Mount Saint-Étienne, a high plateau open to the Jura region. The city later expanded beyond this initial framework into a basin surrounded by seven hills: Chaudanne (422 m), Bregille (458 m), Saint-Étienne (371 m), Roche d'Or (316 m), Planoise (490 m), Rosemont (466 m), and Fort-Benoit (360 m). This specific site was long considered ideal for urban development, strategically and militarily (as a defensive site) and economically and commercially (due to its river access, forests, agriculture, and livestock).

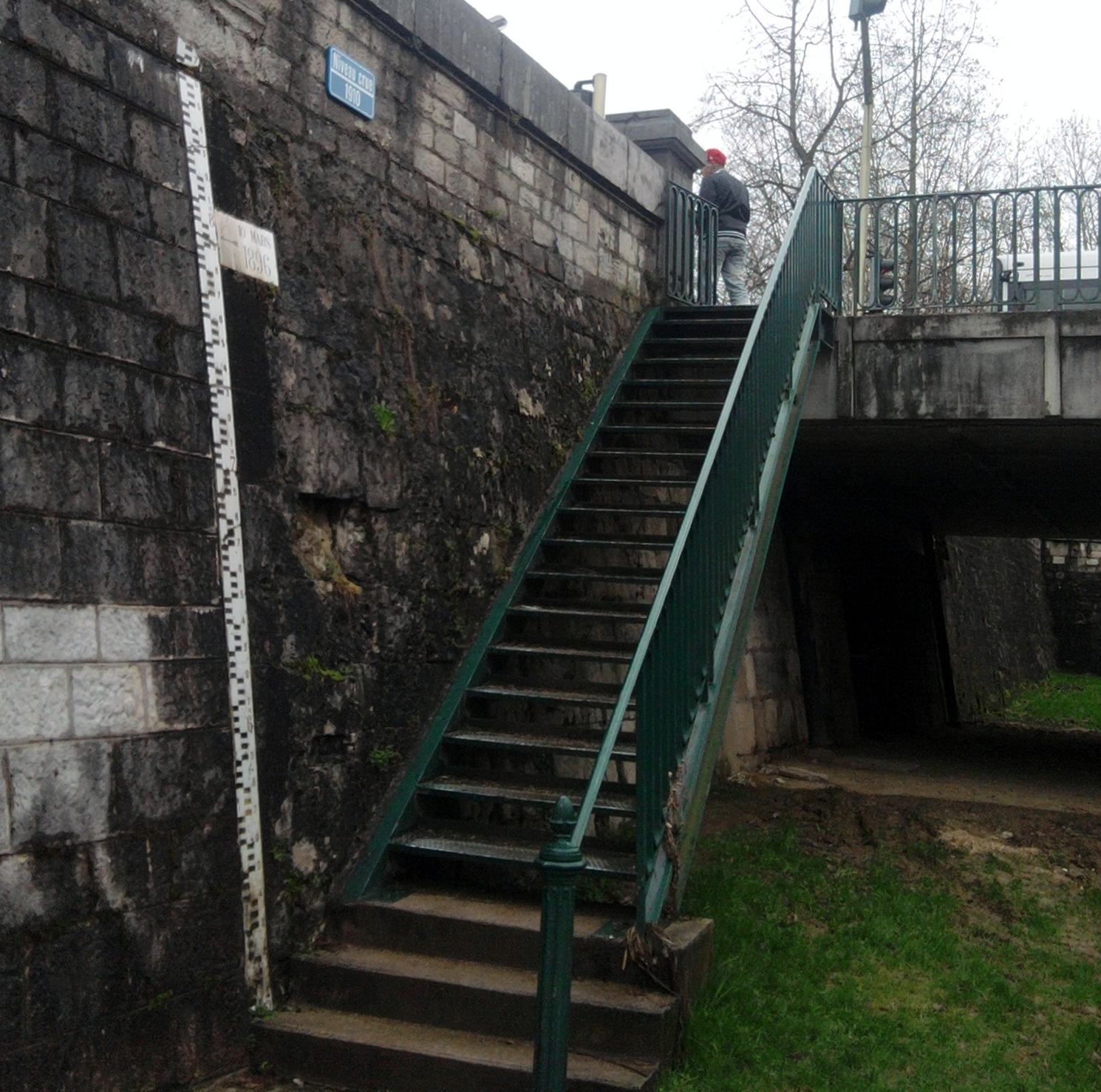
High-water mark, Pont de la République.

The city's central district, encompassing the La Boucle and Battant areas, exhibited high levels of urbanization and population density. In 1906, this area housed 56,168 inhabitants within an ancient core characterized by a dense and homogeneous architectural ensemble of residential and public buildings. The city's distinctive topography and organization, while being significant assets, also presented a substantial disadvantage during flood events. The districts of La Boucle, Battant, and Velotte, along with adjacent sectors such as Rivotte, Tarragnoz, Chamars, the Gare d'eau, and the neighboring communes of Avanne-Aveney and Chalezeule, are bordered by the river and are particularly vulnerable during such disasters.

=== Previous major floods in the city ===
Besançon has experienced repeated inundations throughout its history, with varying degrees of impact. (Note: Gavignet & Estavoyer 1989, p. 161)

The earliest extant records mention significant floods in 1364, 1456, and 1570, when the waters inundated the streets of Gustave-Courbet, Boucheries, and Claude-Pouillet, and even reached the altars of the Cordeliers and the Temple of the Holy Spirit. In the 18th century, seven floods were recorded, including one on October 26, 1776, that destroyed two-thirds of the Bregille Bridge, and another on January 26–27, 1789, that carried away the remaining section of the original structure. In the 19th century, the floods of January 30, 1802, and particularly that of 1882, were particularly memorable, with the latter causing significant damage.

However, the 1910 flood, which resulted in a height of 9.57 meters of water and significant destruction, far exceeded the previous record of 8.85 meters set in 1882. This level of flooding was not anticipated and therefore not included in historical records.

== Chronology ==
=== Early signs of the flood ===
The flood was precipitated by a series of climatic events that began in early 1910 and persisted throughout the year. These events included the overflow of the Seine in Île-de-France, and inundations in other regions such as Chambéry, Troyes, and Morez. The ports of Marseille and Toulon were damaged due to a storm of historic proportions. In eastern France, substantial precipitation in the form of heavy rainfall and abundant snowfall had been recorded since January 10, 1910, reaching its zenith between January 16 and 18. The confluence of warm southwesterly winds and excessive rainfall further exacerbated the situation, as these conditions rapidly melted the substantial snowpack, resulting in soil saturation and water runoff into valley floors. In few hours, all the waterways in the region were inundated, prompting alerts in several cities.

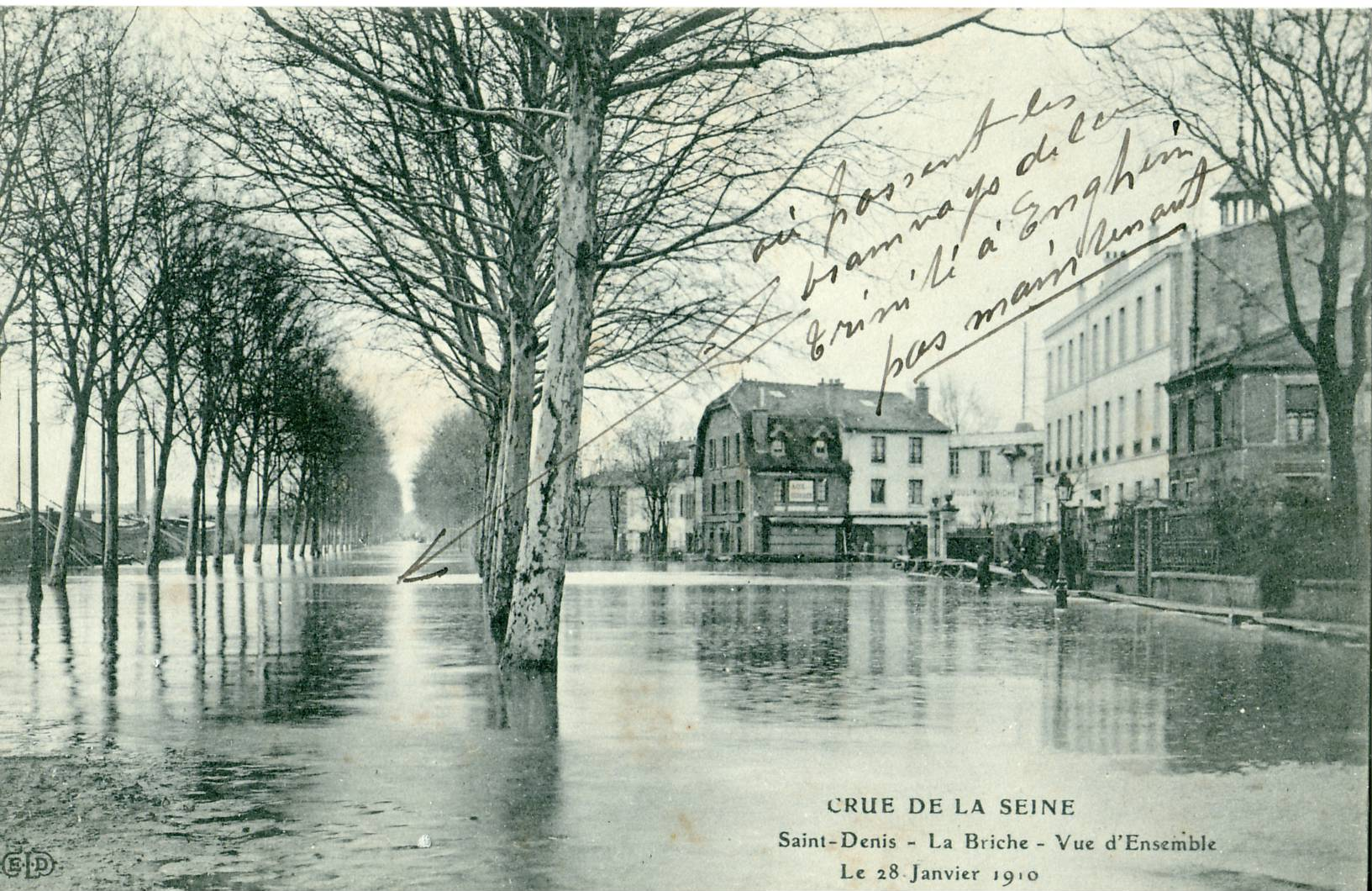
Flooding of the Seine at Saint-Denis and Épinay.

The municipal hydrographic service of Besançon received anticipatory notifications from upstream communes, particularly those in the upper valley, that a substantial flood was imminent—first comparable to that of 1896, then similar to that of 1882, before forecasts reported even higher levels. Local measurements in Besançon corroborated this, indicating that on Tuesday, January 17, at 7:00 a.m., the Doubs river level was recorded at 3.48 meters. By Thursday, January 19, at the same time, the level had already reached 7.25 meters. However, the day before, there was no perceptible concern. The residents had become accustomed to the Doubs river overflowing and did not anticipate a major flood, particularly one that exceeded the magnitude of the 1882 flood. Local newspapers, with the exception of L'Éclair Comtois, merely forecasted light precipitation for January 20th. However, L'Éclair Comtois published a headline that read, "The torrential rains and snowmelt predict a terrible flood of the Doubs."

=== Thursday, January 20 ===
==== Dusk - 5:00 p.m. ====
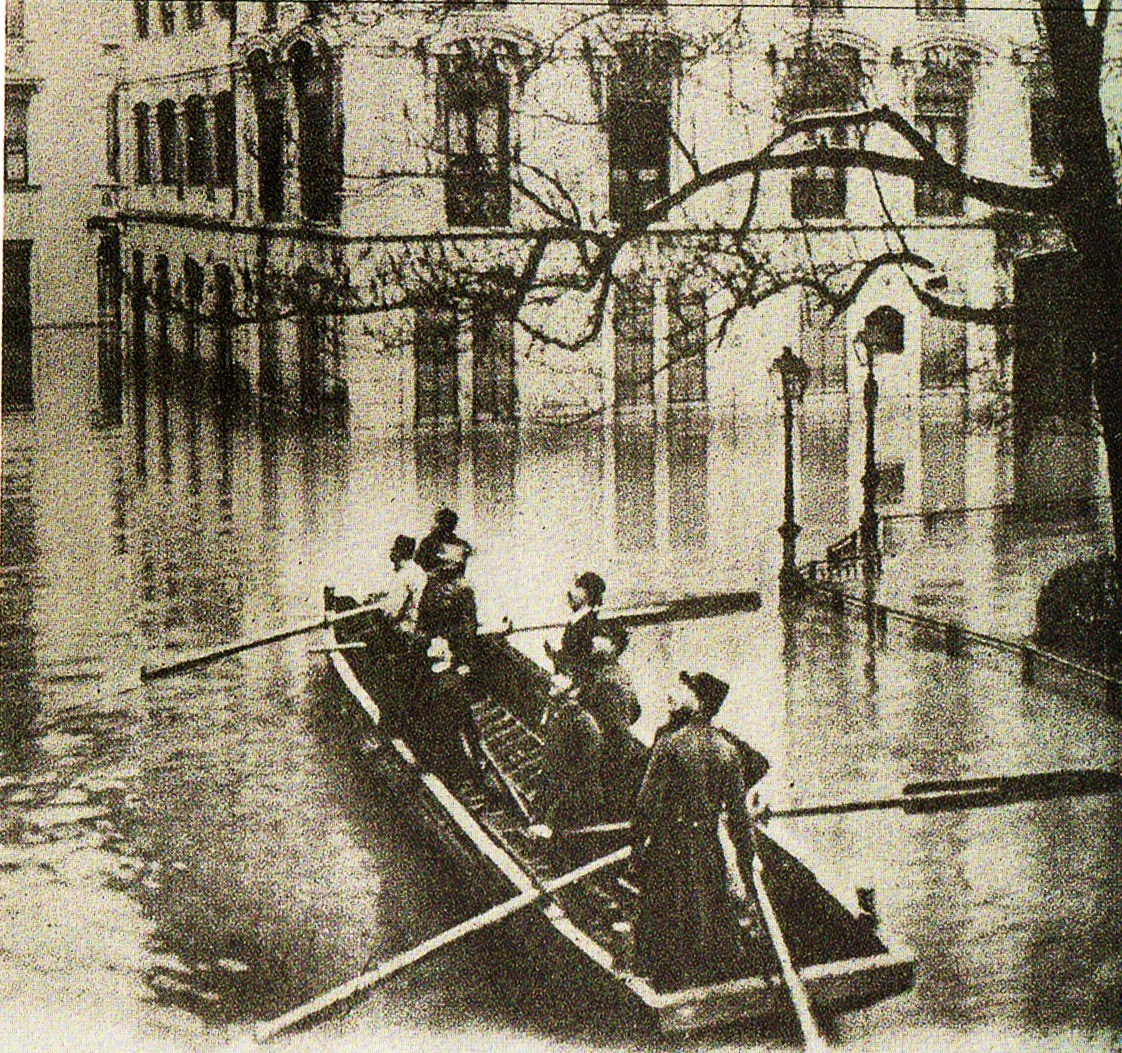
Square Saint-Amour.

At 7:00 a.m., water level readings at the Saint-Paul mill indicated that the river had exceeded seven meters. Authorities, alerted by dispatches and telegraphs from Voujeaucourt and Audincourt, warned the residents of the Franc-Comtois capital with hunting horns about the impending danger. The water level had risen by 15 centimeters per hour during the night, according to estimates, (Note: Gavignet & Estavoyer 1989, p. 162) and had already flooded the basements in the lower part of the city by early morning, including the Place de la Révolution. Many shopkeepers, waist-deep in water, were seen trying to save whatever merchandise they could recover from their cellars. This was when people began to realize the gravity of the flood. In response to this crisis, a specialized crisis unit was established at the municipal government's headquarters. (Note: Gavignet & Estavoyer 1989, p. 163) This unit was led by the secretary general of the municipality and the commander of the local firefighters. The crisis unit oversaw the efforts of fifteen rotating municipal employees. (Note: Gavignet & Estavoyer 1989, p. 164)

Local officials, including deputies Durant and Siffert, conducted a tour of the city. (Note: Gavignet & Estavoyer 1989, p. 167) By 9:00 a.m., the water level had reached 7.52 meters, and by 10:00 a.m., emergency responders (soldiers and police) prohibited access to the Bregille bridge. This decision was partly influenced by the dangerous water level and current of the Doubs, but was primarily driven by the threat posed by pieces of wood, furniture, and even house debris that were smashing into the structure, directly threatening its integrity. The inundation affected numerous areas of the city, including Claude-Pouillet Street, Place de la Révolution near the quay passage, the Micaud Park, Chamars, Archives Street, and a section of Charles-Nodier Street.

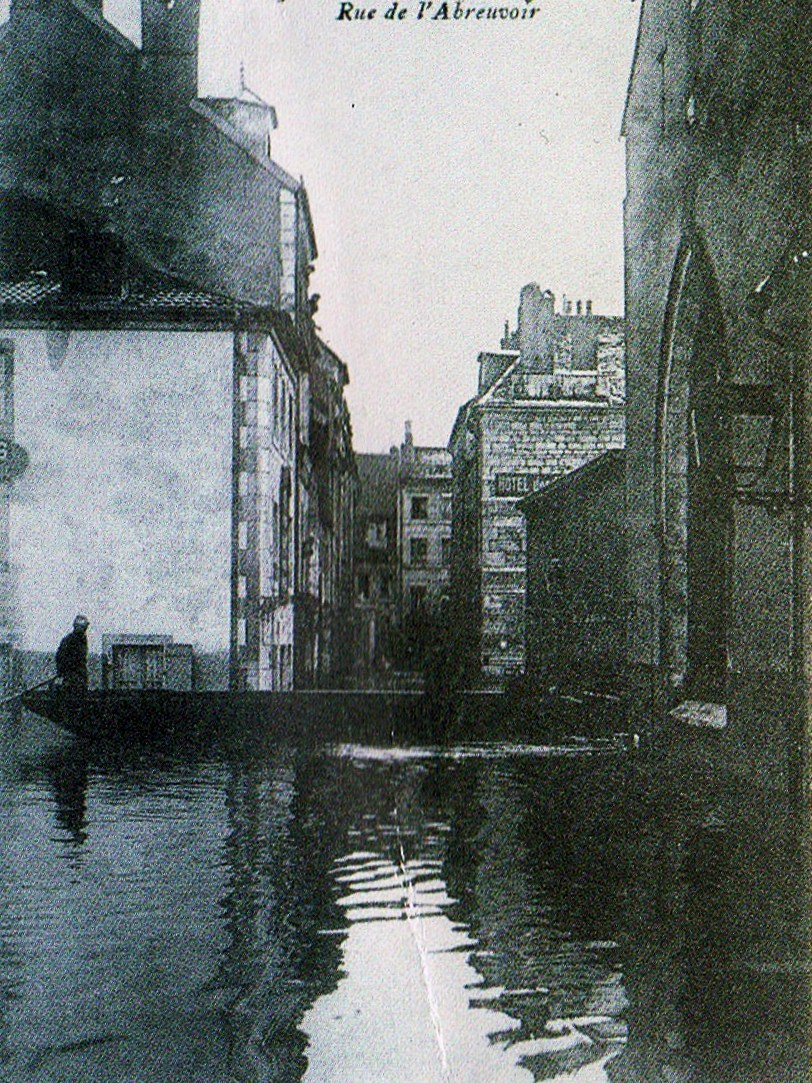
Rue Jean-Petit.

As transportation services, including the electric tramway and La Mouillère station (along with the Besançon-Morteau railway line) ceased operation, army engineers endeavored to salvage equipment from the École des Ponts. Commercial establishments closed sequentially, and the majority of residences were evacuated. Residents grew increasingly alarmed, beginning to stock up on provisions and relocate items from their cellars while closely monitoring the rising river and seeking information. To mitigate the deluge, authorities initiated the closure of the Saint-Paul Mill postern at two o'clock, while the towpaths in Rivotte were inundated with nearly a meter of water. The situation was dire in the Tarragnoz sector, where soldiers were compelled to utilize boats for personnel transportation. Place de la Révolution became entirely inaccessible by land, except for via canoe, and the residents of Rue Claude-Pouillet were evacuated.

==== 5:00 p.m. - 8:00 p.m. ====
By 5:00 p.m., a new report indicated that the water level had reached 8.68 meters, and crossing the bridges required artillery extensions. Pontoon attempts were made on Claude-Pouillet Street to contain the water, but all proved ineffective. The Saint-Paul mill gate dam collapsed, and the public electrical current was cut off after the Casamène power plant boiler was affected. The inundation persisted, gradually encroaching upon the city's infrastructure, and by 7:00 p.m., the floodwaters had reached the first floors of several buildings, compelling residents to seek refuge on higher ground. The inundation progressively expanded beyond the typical flood-prone regions, encompassing additional city areas. The inundation propagated toward the nucleus of La Boucle, traversing the area from Place de la Révolution, passing through the passageway designated as "Huit Trous", and extending to Boucheries Street, followed by Grande Rue, Rue Pasteur, and ultimately Rue du Lycée. An additional torrent descended from the Battant bridge, converging at Place de la Révolution and flowing down Rue Pointune, dislodging cobblestones and various detritus to construct a substantial dam.

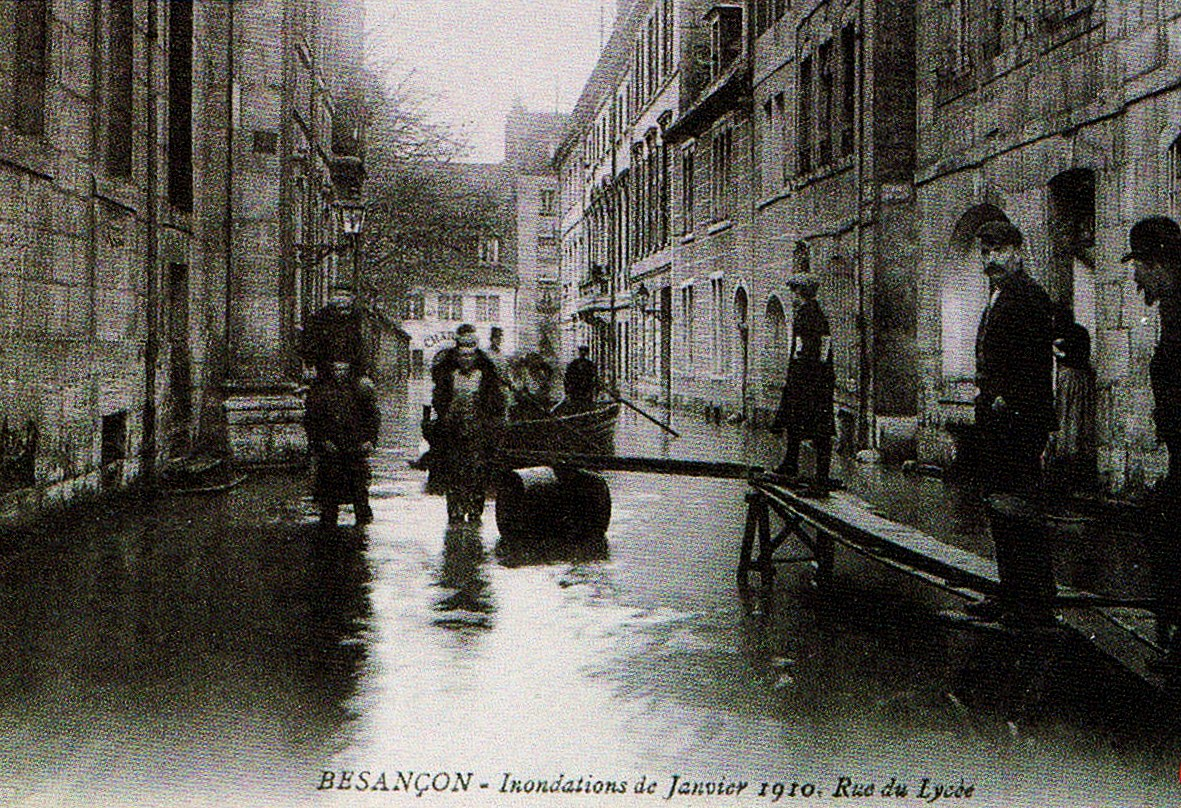
Rue du lycée.

Given the city's preexisting state of being surrounded and on the verge of being impacted by the flood, the breach at the Bregille bridge further exacerbated the ongoing disaster by exacerbating the inundation, thereby amplifying the water level on Rue des Remparts, which was already affected by the overflow from the Saint-Paul gate. By 7:00 p.m., the Bregille bridge, despite being recently constructed, had completely submerged, leading to the subsequent prohibition of crossings across the city's bridges. Water began to overflow from the Pont de la République, rapidly filling the surrounding streets, while an accumulation of logs from the Novillars paper mills continued to encroach upon the Pont de la République and the Battant bridge. A barge at Rivotte, battered by the raging river, was saved just in time, narrowly avoiding a potential disaster. After the shops, the central nursery also closed its doors, sending the children home just before being submerged by the waters. At 7:00 p.m., the Strasbourg quay near the Pelote Tower was flooded, and the water continued to gain ground throughout the city.

==== 8 p.m. - midnight ====
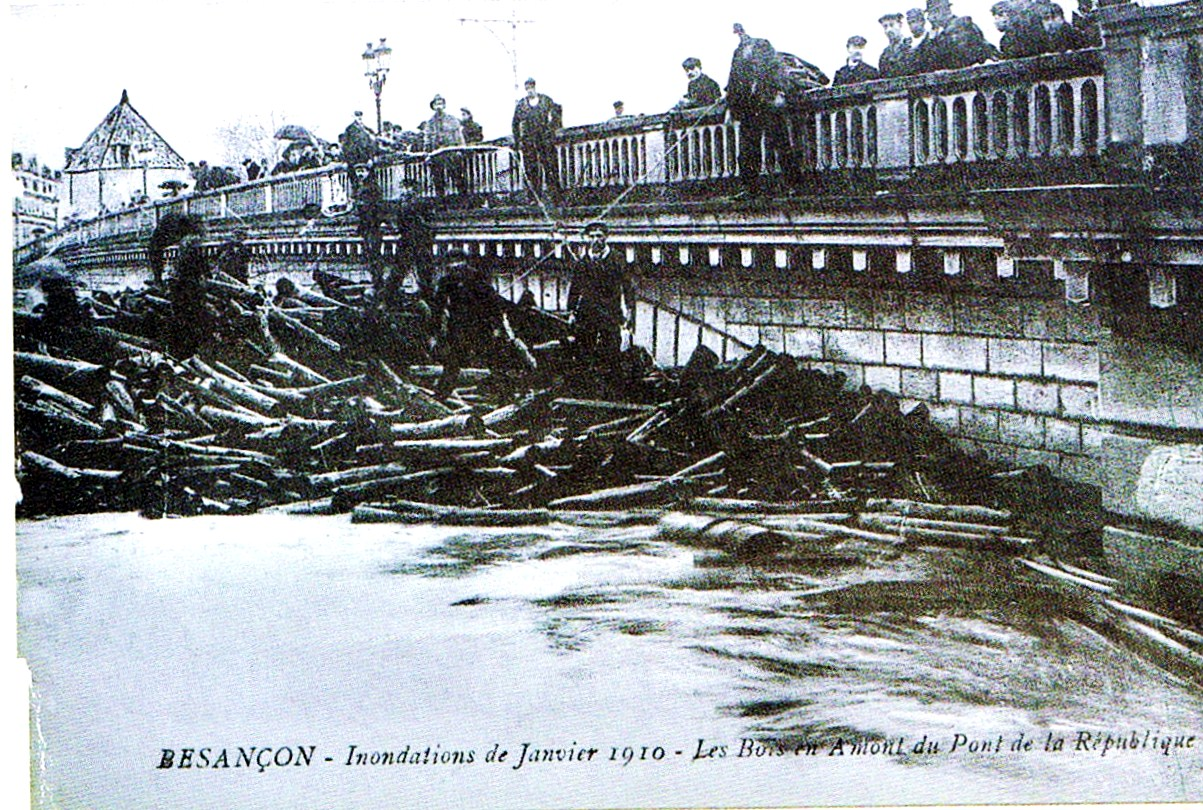
Wood from paper mills accumulates on the République bridge.

At 8:00 p.m., the water level of the river had risen to a point that the République Bridge was completely submerged. This resulted in the flooding of the Rue des Remparts, which can be referred to as a secondary watercourse. The flooding extended from the bridge, covering the Rue de la République up to the Vaxelaire stores. This development affected the Rue d'Alsace and Rue de Lorraine, as well as the Square Saint-Amour and Rue Gambetta. At 9:00 a.m., the authorities declared that this flood would undoubtedly exceed the magnitude of the 1882 flood, establishing itself as the most significant in the city's historical record. After this declaration, it became evident that the opportunity for the retrieval or safeguarding of potentially salvageable items had already elapsed, and that the implementation of the preservation measures that ought to have been executed had been overlooked. At this juncture, the river had begun to traverse the apertures in the ramparts that had been created for the Amathay railway passage, exhibiting increasingly robust currents.

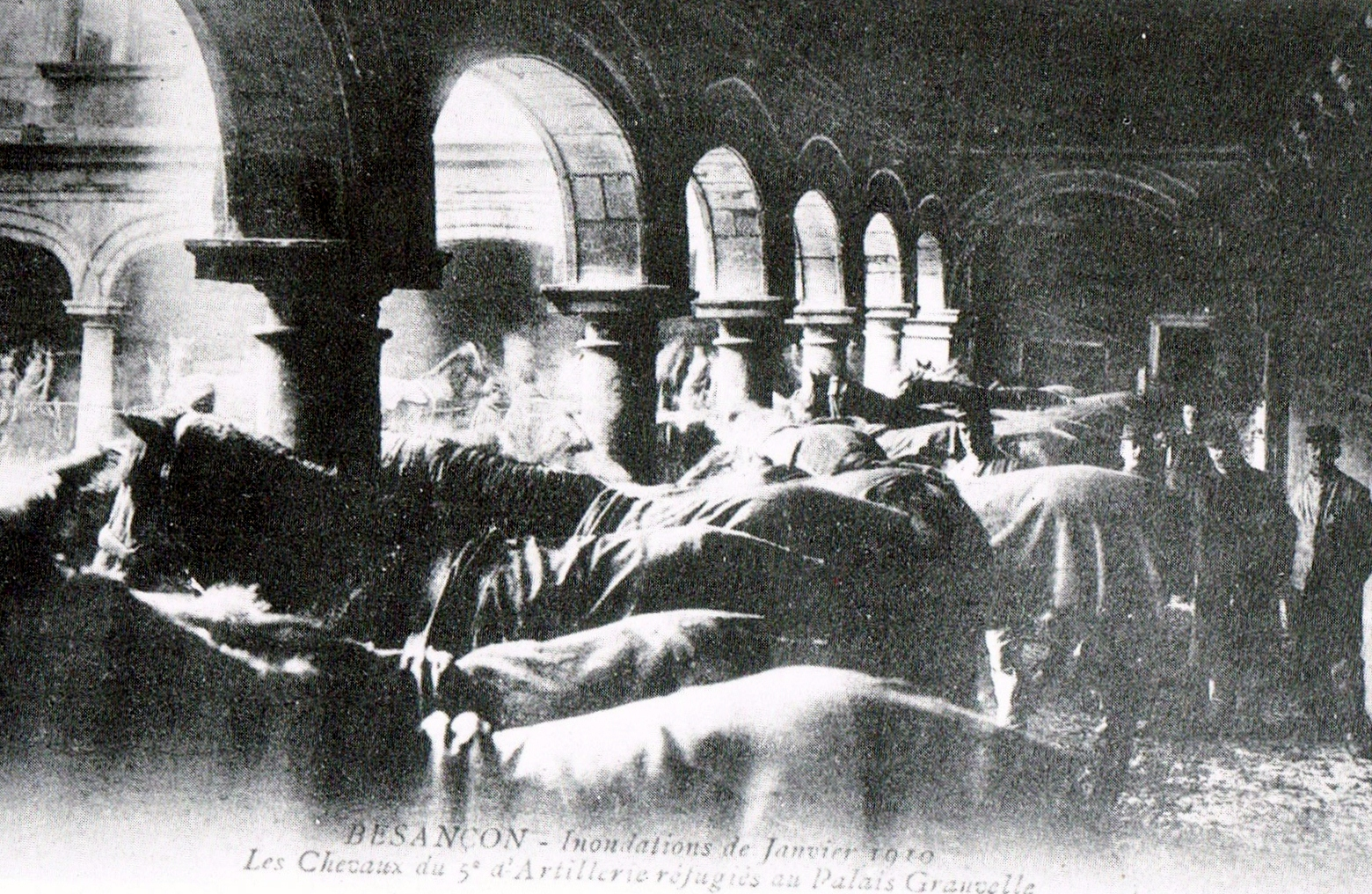
Horses at the Palais Granvelle.

The vessels utilized by washerwomen were imperiled, yet the majority were successfully rescued in the final moments. However, the vessel from Bregille became grounded at Micaud, while the Tarragnoz boat collided with the Velotte bridge piers, resulting in its submersion. The stables of the 5th Artillery Regiment's barracks experienced a sudden inundation, prompting a rapid evacuation of the equines, which were inundated with water reaching up to their chests, to Granvelle Palace and the Abattoir Square. Most commercial establishments were closed, and the recently constructed central post office was inundated with 60 centimeters of turbid water. During the nighttime hours, printing presses were rendered inoperable, thereby impeding the distribution of newspapers—except Le Petit Comtois, which was able to produce a provisional half-format edition.

=== Friday, January 21 ===
==== Midnight - 7 a.m. ====
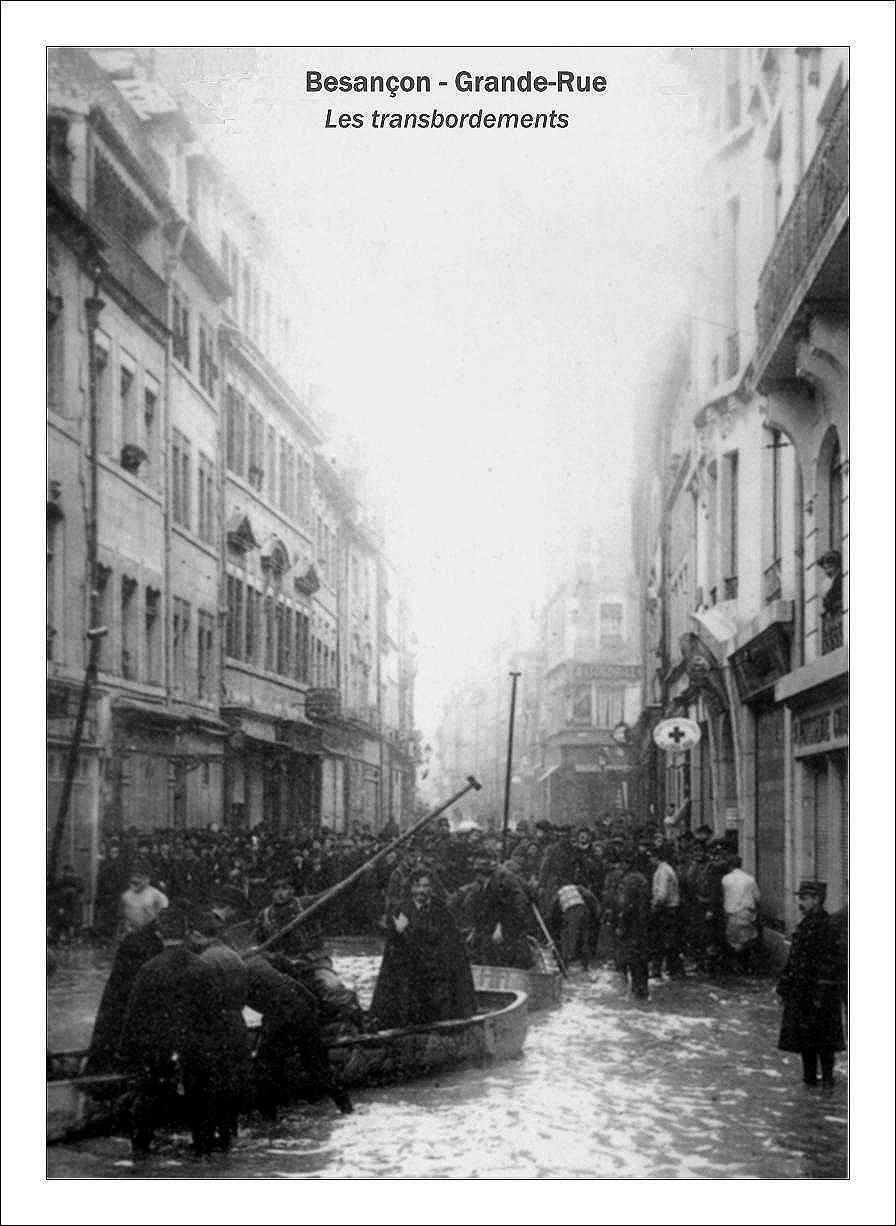
Engineering transshipments.

As the city succumbed to the encroaching tides, the disruption of essential services, including gas supply and public lighting, heightened the prevailing atmosphere of disorder. The faint glow of torches provided illumination, guiding vigilant watchmen as they navigated the flooded streets, shrouded in darkness and mist. Meanwhile, a contingent of soldiers undertook a patrol of the relatively unscathed regions, accompanied by these intrepid watchmen. In the absence of electricity, residents improvised by placing various forms of illumination, including lanterns, kerosene lamps, acetylene lamps, and bicycle lanterns, in their windows to illuminate the now-dimmed streets. The engineering corps intervened even in the most severely affected zones, using artillery prolonged, which enabled the regiment to transport boats to Rue des Granges, Rue du Lycée, Grande Rue, and Rue de la République to rescue distressed residents and facilitate urgent evacuations. (Note: Gavignet & Estavoyer 1989, p. 166)

Le Figaro published an article in its Friday edition reporting on the flood in Besançon, which the meteorological reports predicted would persist, and the news received from all directions is disheartening, as these forecasts were accurate. This time, there are fatalities, and the situation is particularly severe in eastern France, especially in the Doubs region. In Besançon and the surrounding areas, the destruction is extensive, communication lines are down, and unless there is an immediate, albeit improbable, shift in conditions, a major disaster is imminent. Then, the newspaper provided in-depth coverage of the Franc-Comtois capital, highlighting the radical measures taken in response to the crisis. The bridges over the Doubs are under military guard, with only the Battant Bridge allowing for stationary presence, and strict circulation restrictions on the others. Several residents have been forced to evacuate their homes as the river continues to rise, now reaching seven meters above the low-water mark. The flooding has rendered the electric plant inoperable, while the Doubs has carried away a substantial quantity of wood, valued at over a million, from paper mills. The current is also sweeping numerous animals under the bridges, and communications between Montbéliard and Voujeaucourt have been cut off. By the evening, conditions had further deteriorated, as indicated by an alarming report from Besançon: artillery caissons were being deployed to rescue residents from flooded streets, the water was rising at a rate of sixteen centimeters per hour, and snow was falling.

At 3:00 a.m., the flood peak was recorded at 9.57 meters at the Saint-Paul mill, with unofficial measurements indicating heights of up to 10.10 meters in other locations. The inundation was so severe that army cannons were deployed near the Battant bridge, ready to destroy it if the water level continued to rise. The floodwaters submerged several meters of the high school wall, raising the water level by 1.24 meters compared to the 1882 benchmark. At this location, the Doubs River recorded a rise of 53 centimeters. The inundation reached chest-height levels in the streets of Gustave-Courbet and Boucheries. At the Battant bridge, a substantial accumulation of wood from the Novillars paper mills led to a significant blockage, causing the Doubs water level to rise 1.50 meters above its upstream and downstream levels. This event raised concerns about the structural integrity of the bridge, as the water level surpassed the 1882 flood record by 72 centimeters, according to measurements at the Saint-Paul mill.

==== 7 a.m. - beginning of the recession ====
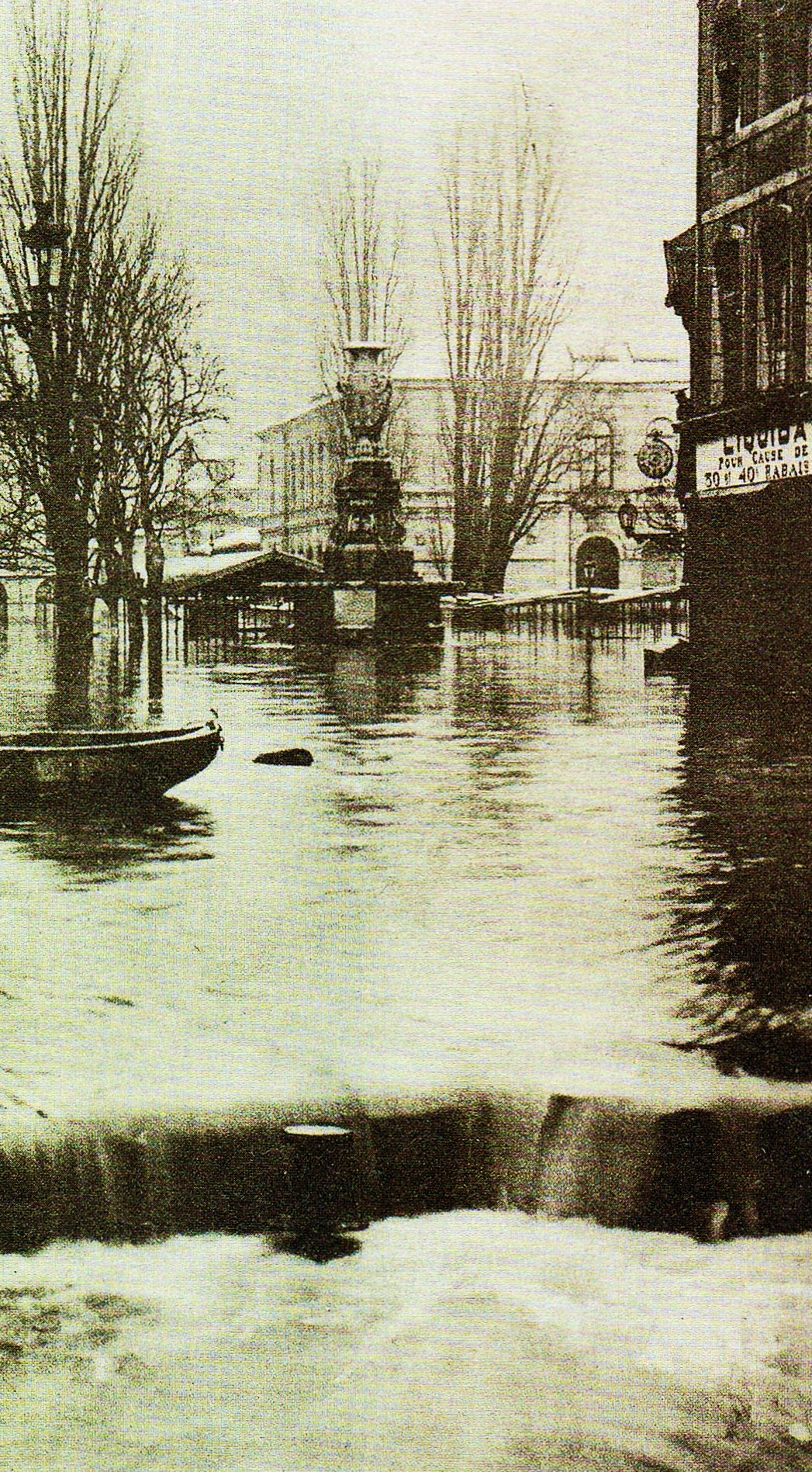
The Place de la Révolution, certainly during the floods.

In the morning, a special correspondent for the newspaper Le Matin published an eloquent article that brought the country's attention to the situation in Besançon. The article described the city as "Besançon, hacked into a multitude of segments by the sudden rise of the Doubs, a gloomy Venice with impassable lagoons. The plains are littered with animal carcasses as if after a fierce slaughterhouse scene. Houses are gutted, decapitated, and thoroughly ransacked." "Unimaginable scenes of anguish occur, but also acts of heroism." Starting at 7 a.m., the water began to recede, gradually retreating from the ground floors of buildings around Saint-Amour Square. Residents who had taken refuge on the upper floors received supplies and assistance from soldiers and firefighters, supported by concerned civilians.

Despite the ongoing economic downturn, the water level remained a significant concern at 11 a.m., particularly in Lorraine Street, Saint-Amour Square, and the girls' high school, where the kitchens, dining halls, and offices were submerged under a meter of water. By 2 p.m., Pointune Street was still inundated with nearly a meter and a half of water. A temporary lake formed, encompassing the areas of Chamars, the School of Medicine, Saint-Jacques Hospital, and the streets of Orme and Arbalète, extending up to the courthouse. Consequently, efforts shifted toward the restoration of the city's infrastructure, businesses, and industries. Although water persisted in the streets, the Doubs gradually receded.

=== Following days ===
On Saturday, January 22, at 7:00 a.m., the flood level was recorded at 7.27 meters. By Sunday at the same time, it had receded to 5.98 meters, and by Monday, it had decreased to 4.65 meters. On Saturday, the Gas and Electricity Company placed candles in streetlamps, and damage assessments began by the weekend. By the beginning of the following week, the waters had almost entirely receded, and the city initiated an inventory of the initial damages, which amounted to at least 75,000 francs at the time. (Note: Gavignet & Estavoyer 1989, p. 171) A municipal decree mandated the disinfection of streets with copper sulfate, and waste sites were treated with quicklime and cresyl. In the days that followed, the waters had nearly disappeared, and by January 25, urgent repair work began. (Note: Gavignet & Estavoyer 1989, p. 172) The community of Besançon demonstrated remarkable resilience, with many residents offering to assist in the cleanup and reconstruction efforts.

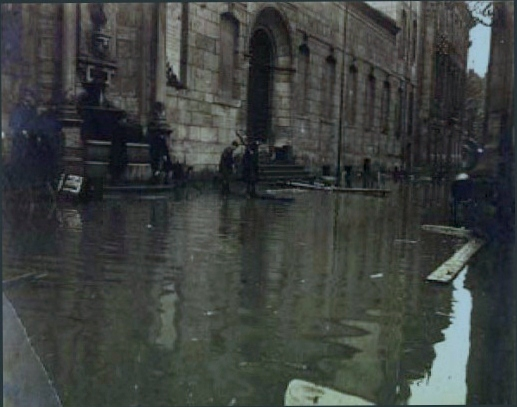
Rue du Lycée, in recession.

On January 26, the deputies of Doubs secured a budget of two million francs to address the reconstruction work. The municipality expressed gratitude to all rescue personnel, offering them a reward of 600 francs per person, and conveyed sympathy to the flood victims. To provide financial assistance to those who had lost everything, several balls and concerts were organized. As reconstruction efforts progressed, controversy arose, with authorities facing criticism for perceived shortcomings, particularly the lack of emergency services during and after the flood to inspect homes and locate potential victims. The most intense criticisms surfaced in the days following the event through media outlets. Nevertheless, daily life gradually resumed its normal course. Commercial establishments reopened, the director of Victor-Hugo High School announced that students would resume classes soon, and the recently renovated streets regained their usual vibrancy.

However, the full restoration of Besançon to its previous state would take several more months, with the city requiring over six months to nearly erase the traces of this historic flood, which remains ingrained in the memories of many inhabitants. To mark a symbolic fresh start, the city welcomed President of the Republic Armand Fallières in August, commemorating the occasion with official ceremonies and popular festivities.

== Assessment and consequences of the flood ==
=== Extent and measures of the flood ===
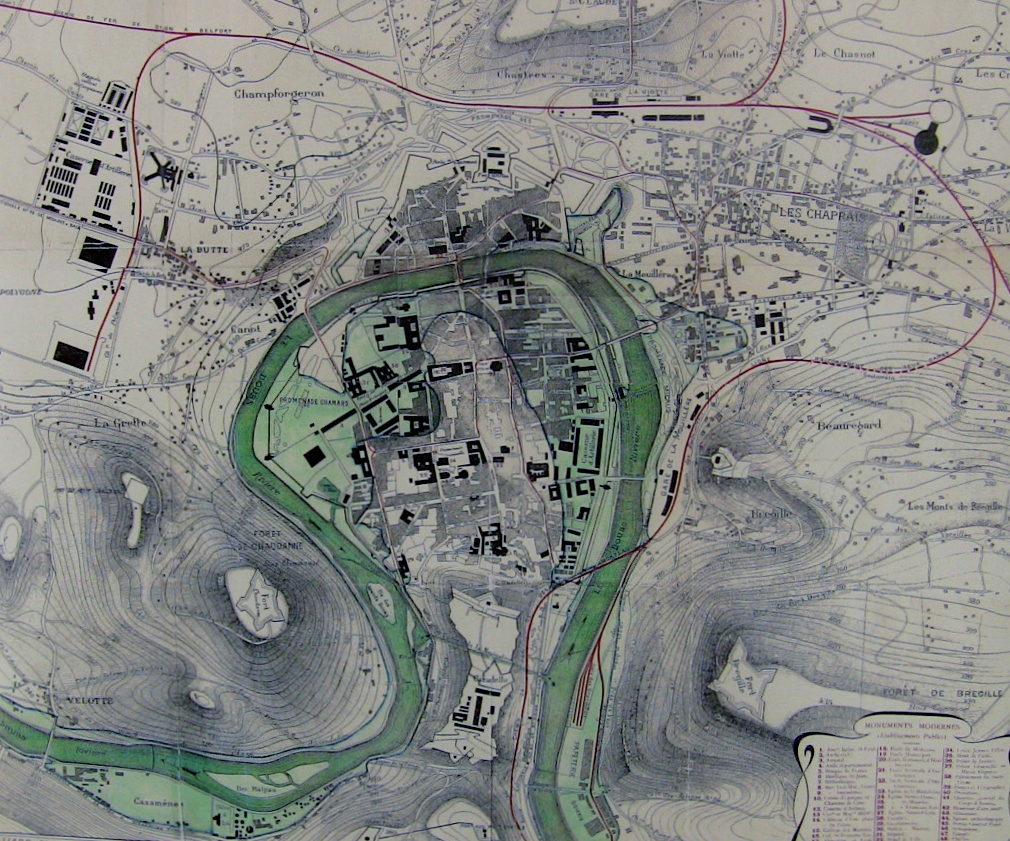
Period plan of the city under water.

Flooded areas on a map of today's city.

This flood was characterized as exceptional, with half of the city of Besançon experiencing varying degrees of impact, often resulting in floodwaters reaching heights of nearly one and a half meters. At the peak of the disaster, the water level attained 9.57 meters at the Saint-Paul Mill gauge on January 21 at 3 a.m., with a flow rate estimated between 1,400 and 1,610 cubic meters per second—exceeding the typical value of 730 cubic meters per second for a flood with a two-year recurrence period.

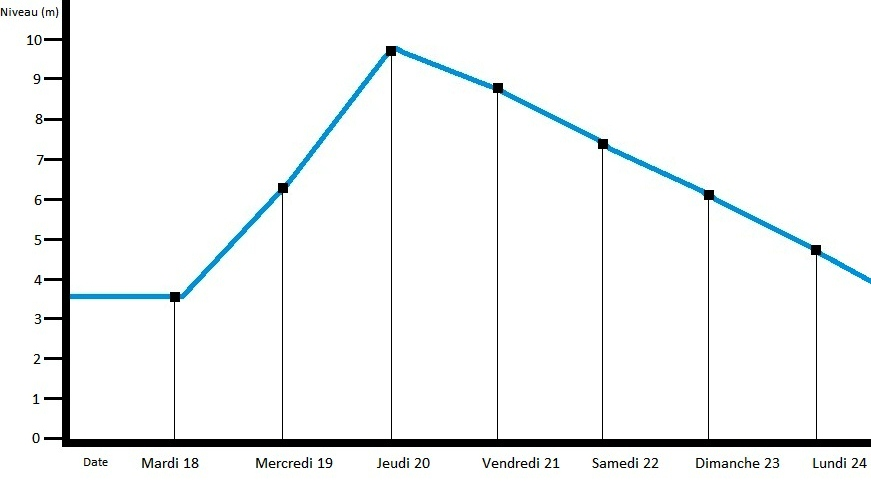
Graph of flood levels in Besançon, between Tuesday 18th and Monday 24th.

The deluge engulfed numerous districts, including La Boucle (with its heart and soul, along with Chamars, the Gare d'Eau, Rivotte, Tarragnoz, and La Mouillère, though Saint-Jean experienced comparatively minor inundation), Battant, and Velotte. The floodwaters even reached the periphery of the Chaprais neighborhood. In his report from September 1910, the civil engineer for the Doubs department described the impact of the floodwaters: "For several days, nearly half of the city was submerged by water, which in some neighborhoods rose 1.50 meters above street level" (Jones, 1910). The extent of this flood was thus significant and unprecedented.

Official heights recorded at the Moulin Saint-Paul navigation scale
Tuesday 18th	Wednesday 19th	Thursday 20th	Friday 21st	Saturday 22nd	Sunday 23rd	Monday 24th
7h: 3.48 m	7h: 3.88 m 23h: 5.96 m	5h: 6.90 m 7h: 7.25 m 9h: 7.52 m 15h: 8.40 m 17h: 8.68 m 23h: 9.32 m	3h: 9.57 m 7h: 9.20 m 16h: 8.50 m	7h: 7.27 m	7h: 5.98 m	19h: 4.65 m

=== Impact of the flood ===
The flood had an economic impact and caused substantial damage, but the human toll was lower than expected. According to various documents, period articles, and accounts, the capital of Franche-Comté, Besançon, did not experience any loss of life, in contrast to the city of Dole and several other municipalities upstream and downstream, which were more severely affected. The total cost of the damage caused by the flood in Besançon alone was estimated at nearly two million francs at the time, equivalent to approximately 6.5 million euros based on INSEE values. The municipality and the State had to invest heavily to rebuild the Franche-Comté capital, and telegrams were even launched to launch subscription campaigns to support the most vulnerable while waiting for work to resume.

On January 29, 1910, L'Illustration published a special issue: "Almost as much as in Paris and its suburbs along the Seine, the deluge of recent days has caused disasters, disrupted communications, and profoundly troubled the lives of provincial populations. Unable to present scenes or depictions for all regions and localities affected—which would, in any case, be repetitive—we limit ourselves to reproducing a few striking and typical examples of the effects of the flood in Auxerre, Troyes, Besançon, and Chambéry."

==== Economic impact ====
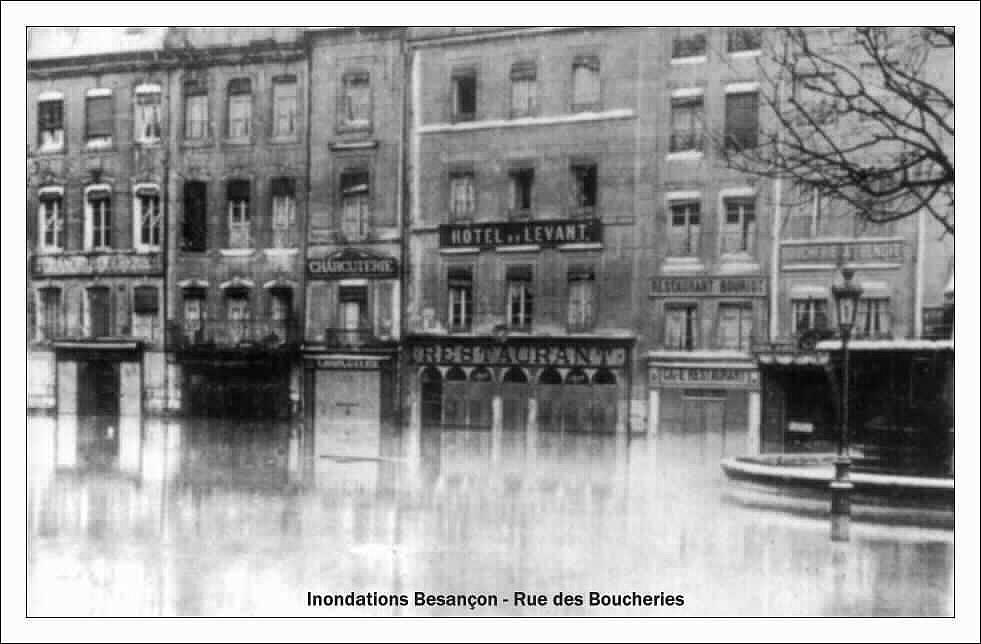
Hotel du Levant under water.

The impact on economic activities was significant but not catastrophic, as businesses in the city faced considerable disruption during the flood. Many of Besançon's major industrial facilities were undamaged; however, their immediate reopening was impeded by a shortage of gas or electricity. The only significant disruptions were observed at the large silk factory in Prés de Vaux and the neighboring paper mill, which were completely halted after being flooded. The Novillars paper mill suffered the most substantial impact, with a loss of 35,000 cubic meters of wood, estimated to be valued at one million francs at the time. Numerous small and medium-sized enterprises suffered substantial damage, including the hotels Messageries, Halles, Couronne, Vuillermoz, and Levant; the restaurants Mouget and Brochet-Delcey; the grocery stores Marotte and Jeanney; and the butcher shops Benoît and Meyer.

The economic impact of the flood was extensive, with numerous businesses experiencing significant losses. Regey and Scheck, for instance, suffered "dry" losses in soap and sugar, while Gainsmandel's drugstore lost over 20,000 francs worth of equipment. The hardware store Burdin's inventory was submerged under two meters of water, while the prominent clothing store Vawelaire and Pignot experienced similar flooding. The hotels Europe and Postes were covered in silty mud. (Note: Gavignet & Estavoyer 1989, p. 170) The lumber stocks of Girardot and Grest were swept into the Doubs, and the general tobacco warehouse was completely ruined. Many other stores were devastated, and as the floodwaters receded, the ground was strewn with goods—sugar, soap, fine hosiery, haberdashery items, liquors, and shoes—scattered across the streets. Some businesses experienced a surge in activity, leading to a shortage of goods. This increase in demand was not significant, but it did benefit some businesses, allowing them to expand their operations.

==== Impact on infrastructure and other areas ====
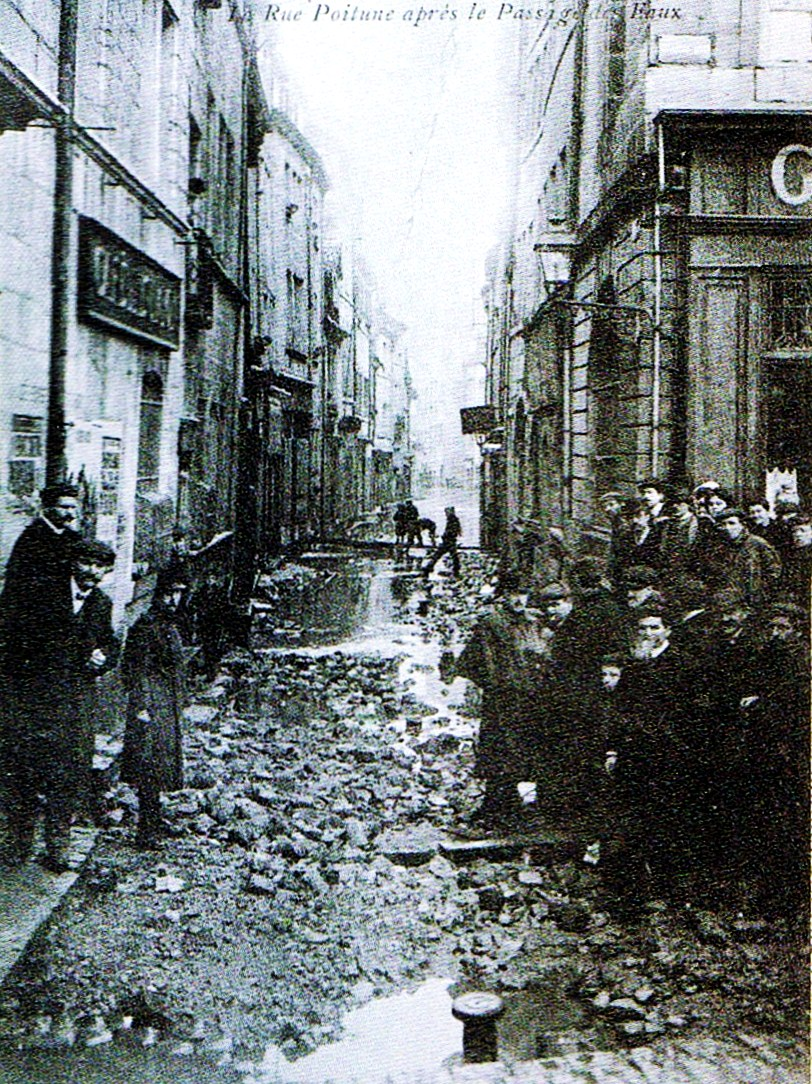
Rue Claude-Pouillet after the flood.

The material damage incurred was substantial. The canal beneath the Citadel suffered damage, the embankment near the Tarragnoz lock experienced erosion over a depth of more than two meters, and the primary gas pipeline was completely exposed along the Lyon road. Numerous streets were severely damaged, including Claude-Pouillet Street, which experienced a depression of over a meter, leaving no cobblestone intact. This raised concerns about the stability of nearby buildings. A similar situation was observed on Remparts, Bregille, and Rivotte streets, which were likened to dried riverbeds. Numerous buildings were wrecked, and several houses in La Boucle and Battant had to be urgently shored up. Beyond structural damage, the entire process of restoring streets, homes, and buildings, including clearing out flooded basements, was necessary.

Many basements in the La Boucle district were inundated, and the municipal authorities offered to remove damaged furniture free of charge, provided it was placed on the street. The municipality also undertook the task of clearing the silt deposited by the Doubs, debris, water-damaged objects, and spoiled goods. The Museum of Fine Arts and Archaeology lost precious textiles, and sarcophagi were damaged. The Applied Arts Museum and the market halls experienced inundation, with water levels reaching 60 centimeters, while the Saint-Esprit Temple was nearly completely submerged, with two meters of water inside. Financial institutions were compelled to assess the contents of safes located in flooded basements. There were reports of a stone staircase being torn away by the force of the floodwaters. Furthermore, a laundromat was destroyed, and numerous others required extensive repairs.

=== A preventable disaster? ===
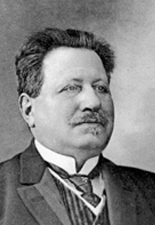
Alexandre Grosjean, mayor of Besançon from 1906 to 1912.

For local media outlets and a considerable number of residents, the substantial ramifications of the flood might have been mitigated to a certain extent. Although this event transpired under unique and specific conditions, the absence of adequate preparation and a sequence of unanticipated occurrences contributed to the residents' discontent, leading them to demand explanations from the authorities. As the assessment process unfolded, the press conveyed the concerns of the inhabitants and documented the operational shortcomings. The primary issue was the series of increasingly severe flood warnings, which did not allow residents sufficient time to implement effective protective measures. It was not until two alerts had been issued that the authorities finally declared the occurrence of a flood surpassing the highest recorded water levels. Moreover, the disruption of telegraphic communications with downstream municipalities impeded the dissemination of public information regarding the progression of the flood, engendering a state of complete uncertainty and amplifying residents' fears.

The second malfunction was attributed to the absence of a barrier at the ramparts' opening. Despite the width of these structures exceeding 10 meters, they featured openings that permitted the tramway to traverse, offering no protection, particularly in the vicinity of the Bregille Bridge, a vulnerable area of the city during such disasters. The quay posterns remained open during the flood, the scheduled repair of the Battant Bridge arches was not executed, the sewer system had not been modernized for an extended period, and the authorities did not dispatch rescue teams to inspect houses during or after the flood to ascertain potential victims. Furthermore, various structures along the river, beginning at Battant bridge, induced significant turbulence, compelling the Doubs to carve out a secondary channel along Claude-Pouillet Street. This phenomenon exacerbated the situation near Saint-Jacques Hospital, extending as far as the Bregille Bridge due to the impact of Bastion 17 and the Republic Bridge, thus leading to further damage.

Nonetheless, a plan for flood management structures had been developed, which could have significantly mitigated the impact of this unprecedented flood. However, it was never implemented. Alexandre Grosjean (1851–1922), mayor of the city from 1906 to 1912, defended himself as best he could, citing financial difficulties as well as the state's failure to fulfill financial commitments for the restoration of strategic points in the city during floods.

== Analysis and measures taken since 1910 ==
=== A rare flood ===
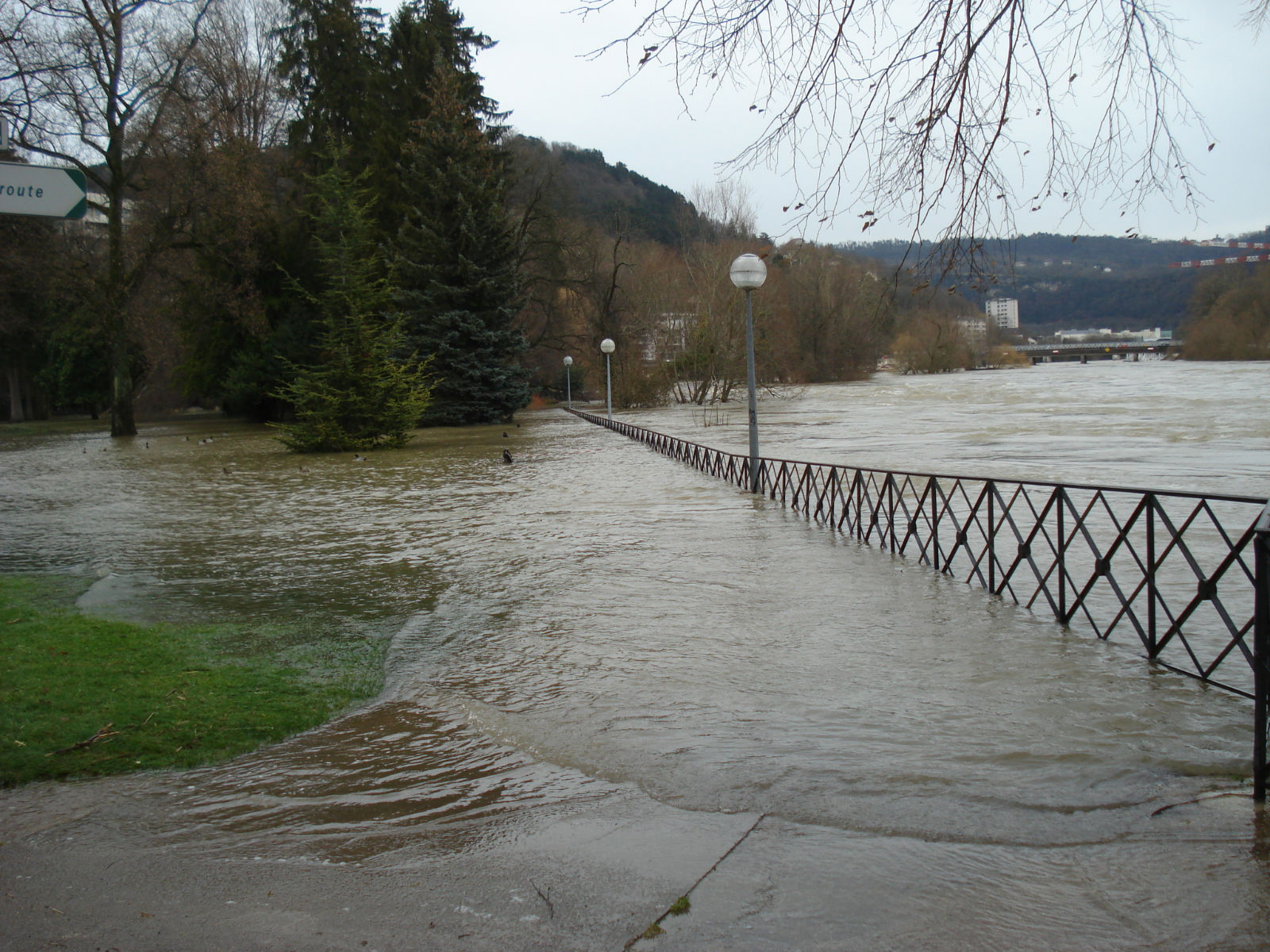
Flooding at Promenade Micaud, December 8, 2010.

Besançon, in collaboration with experts from the Hydrology and Natural Risks Department of the Regional Environment Directorate, has conducted a comprehensive analysis of the potential for a new flood of a similar magnitude to that experienced in 1910. This analysis has involved identifying necessary measures to mitigate the impact of such an event. The Franche-Comté capital has experienced other floods in 1955, 1970, 1983, 1990, and 1999, but none were as severe as the 1910 flood. However, expert Yannick Cadet is certain that another disaster of the same magnitude is more than likely. He elaborated that the unpredictability of this phenomenon, which he terms "100-year flood", renders effective prediction impossible. However, Cadet has proposed several measures to mitigate the impact of such events within the city.

In 2004, the French publication Le Point published an article on the subject of the potential for future occurrences of the 1910 flood in the Doubs region. The article, based on the findings of the Regional Environment Directorate, assessed the likelihood of such an event, concluding that while the calculation models are indisputable, the volumes considered in the study are somewhat excessive. A review of the 1910 flood, the most significant in Besançon's history, reveals that the maximum recorded volume was 1,610 m^{3}/s. The multi-arched Battant bridge played a pivotal role in diverting the floodwaters into the Boucle by acting as a barrier. However, the study is based on a value of 1,750 m^{3}/s, which raises the water level by nearly one meter compared to 1910. This is particularly significant given that the city's bridges were rebuilt after the war and no longer allow for the same dispersion of floodwaters.

In response to the potential for a recurrence of the 1910 flood, André Bachoc, the head of the Regional Directorate for the Environment, stated that this value is a precautionary measure. He further noted that, similar to the situation in Besançon, numerous cities in France and worldwide are exposed to this type of risk and are considering solutions to mitigate the phenomenon. This is particularly evident in the Île-de-France region, where a new historic rise of the Seine is a distinct possibility.

=== Flood studies and prevention measures ===
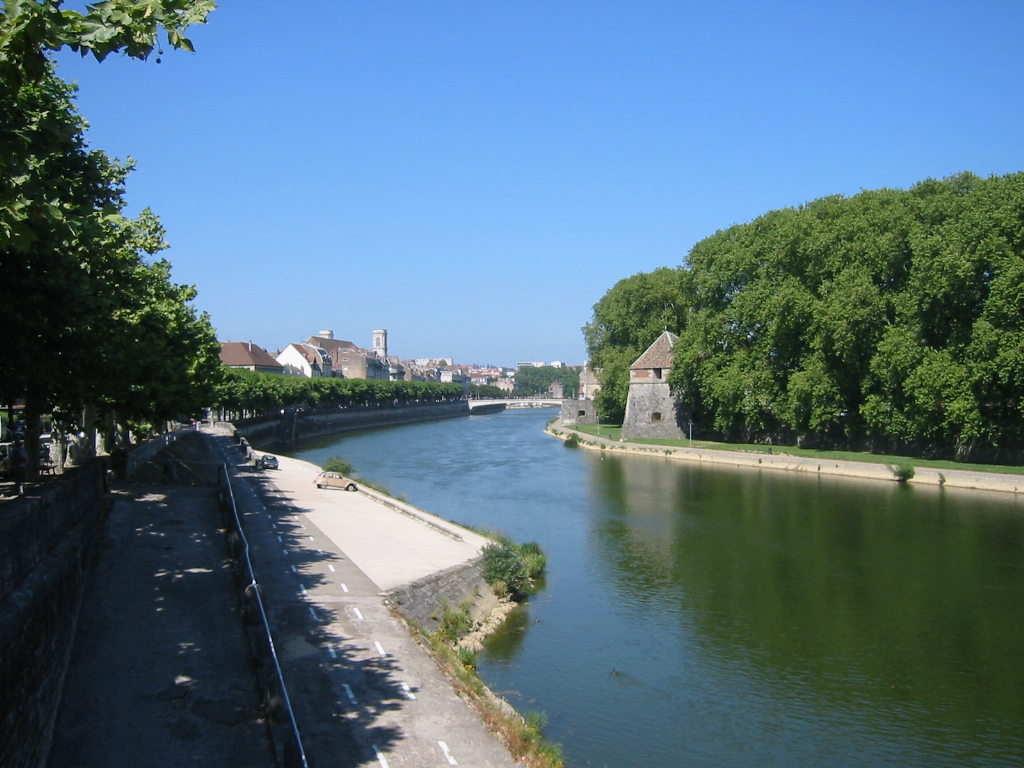
Le Doubs at Battant, 2006.

According to the study conducted by the Regional Environment Directorate, expert Yannick Cadet recommends that Besançon implement proactive measures to mitigate the risk of flooding. These measures include the construction of embankments and dikes, which, while not guaranteed to prevent a flood of the same magnitude as the 1910 event, could minimize the risk of significant damage. Cadet emphasizes the importance of raising awareness among residents as the most effective defense against a potential catastrophe of this nature. Developing a Flood Risk Prevention Plan (PPRI) for the municipalities along the Doubs, particularly Besançon, is identified as a crucial point in the study.

Besançon has already implemented a risk management plan that integrates flood heights and water speeds along the Deluz-Avanne-Aveney section. This plan establishes a local urban development strategy, accompanied by a stringent set of guidelines for flood-prone areas and requirements for existing structures to mitigate infrastructure vulnerability. For instance, La Rodia has been elevated by 2.5 meters above ground level to adhere to the stipulated flood level requirements. Complementary measures have been planned to protect the Îlot Pasteur from floods, as well as for the rehabilitation of the Saint-Jacques Hospital.

The municipality has established an alert system that distributes information about anticipated or imminent water level rises to thousands of Bisontins via telephone. The municipality is considering additional preventive measures, including studies to design hydraulic structures aimed at protecting La Boucle and its population from potential flood risks. Additionally, plans are being explored for the construction of anti-flood walls on the left bank of the Doubs, upstream from the Bregille Bridge, as well as the deployment of removable cofferdams to temporarily block low points along the bank or pedestrian pathways.

== Exhibitions and archives ==
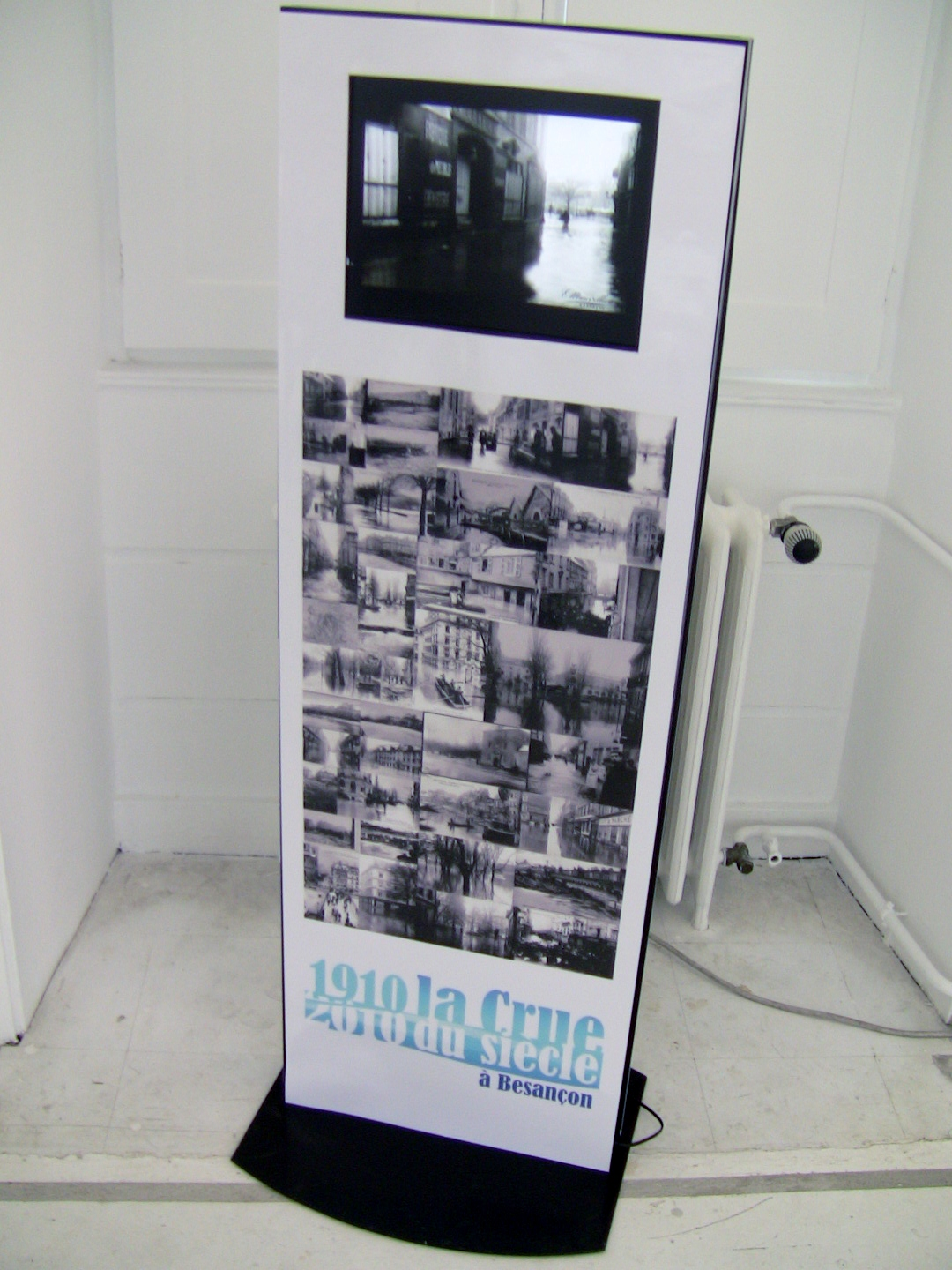
An interactive panel at the 2010 show.

=== Exhibitions ===
The 1910 flood was the subject of an extensive local study, followed by an exhibition held from January 21 to February 6, 2010, at the exhibition hall of the Besançon City Hall. Visitors to the exhibition could view approximately thirty-period photographs, accompanied by captions and a large floor map that precisely illustrated the flood-affected areas. Furthermore, display panels were installed in seventeen outdoor locations from January 21 to 28 to showcase the extent of the flooding in La Boucle.

=== Photographic archives ===
A corpus of photographs was produced during the disaster, constituting an impressively exhaustive archive. Although the 1882 flood is often regarded as analogous to that of 1910, the technological advancements of the 20th century enabled widespread documentation of the event. Photographers of the time confronted inclement weather conditions, including low temperatures and heavy rainfall, and even the perils posed by the strong currents. They were acutely aware of the historical importance of the event and committed to returning to their studios with a collection of photographs depicting the inundated streets of Besançon.

Many postcards were published, not only depicting the event but also, in some cases, featuring descriptive text on the reverse side to document the magnitude of the phenomenon. The selection and digitization of the most photographs were conducted by the Regional Directorate for the Environment (DIREN), with the support of the departmental and municipal archives. These images were subsequently displayed in exhibitions and disseminated online.

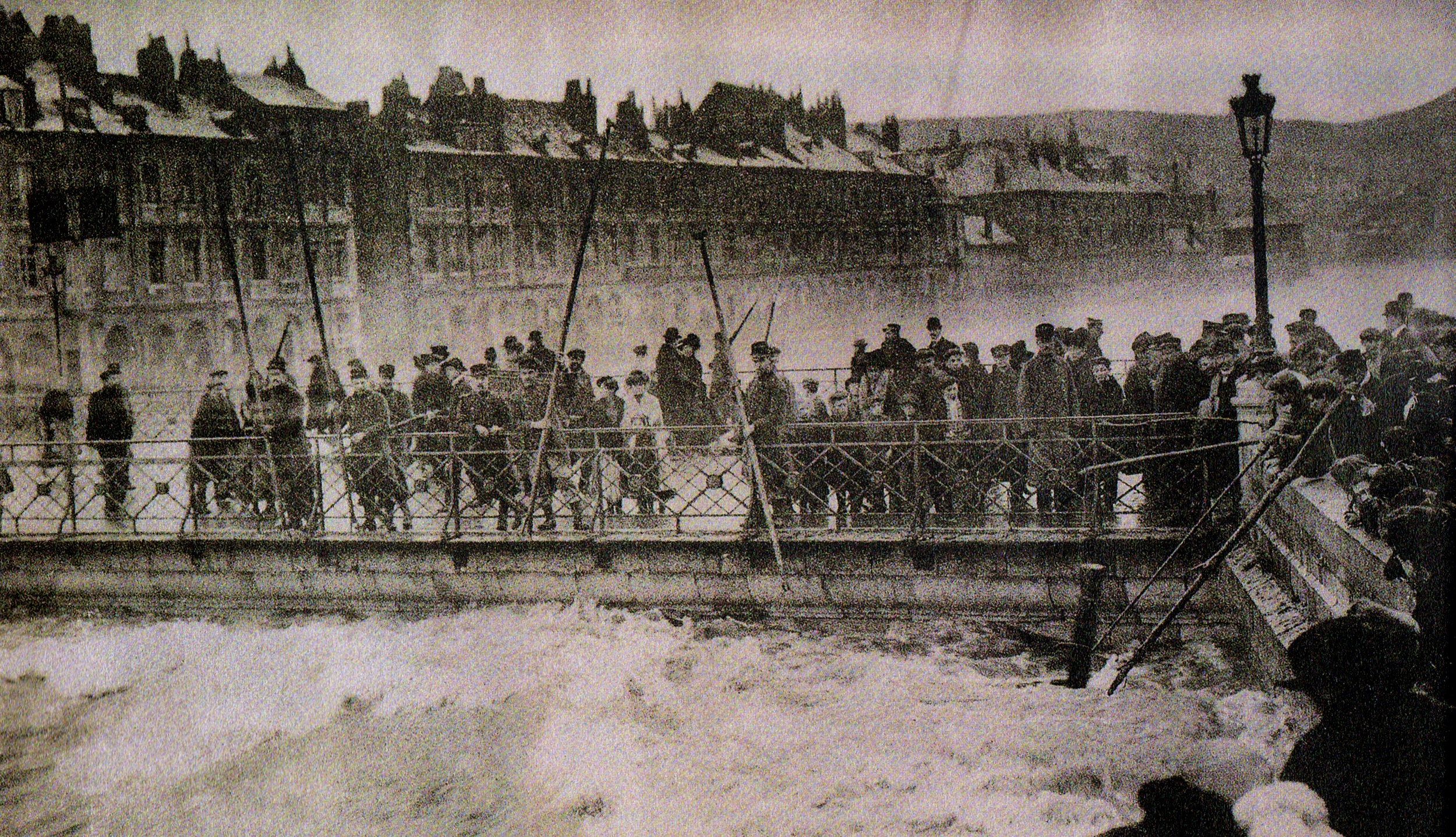
Battant bridge, the January, 21st 1910.

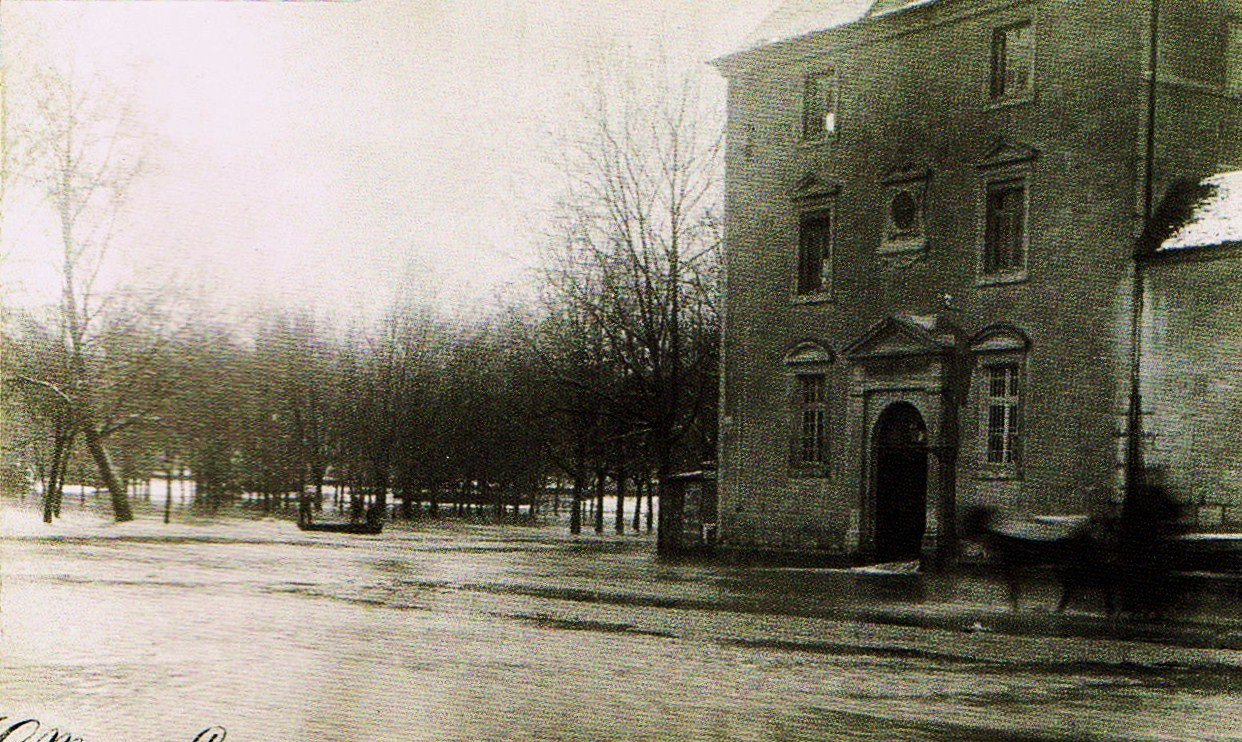
Saint-Jacques place.

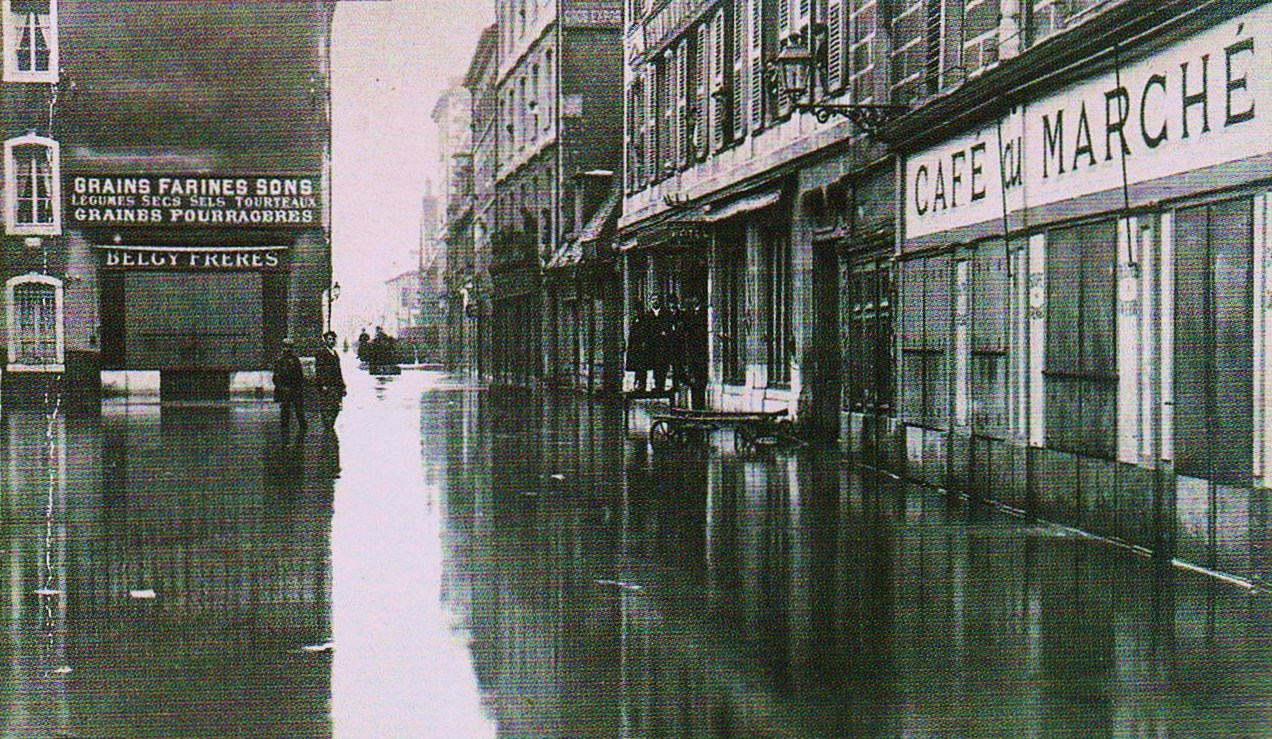
The Révolution place.

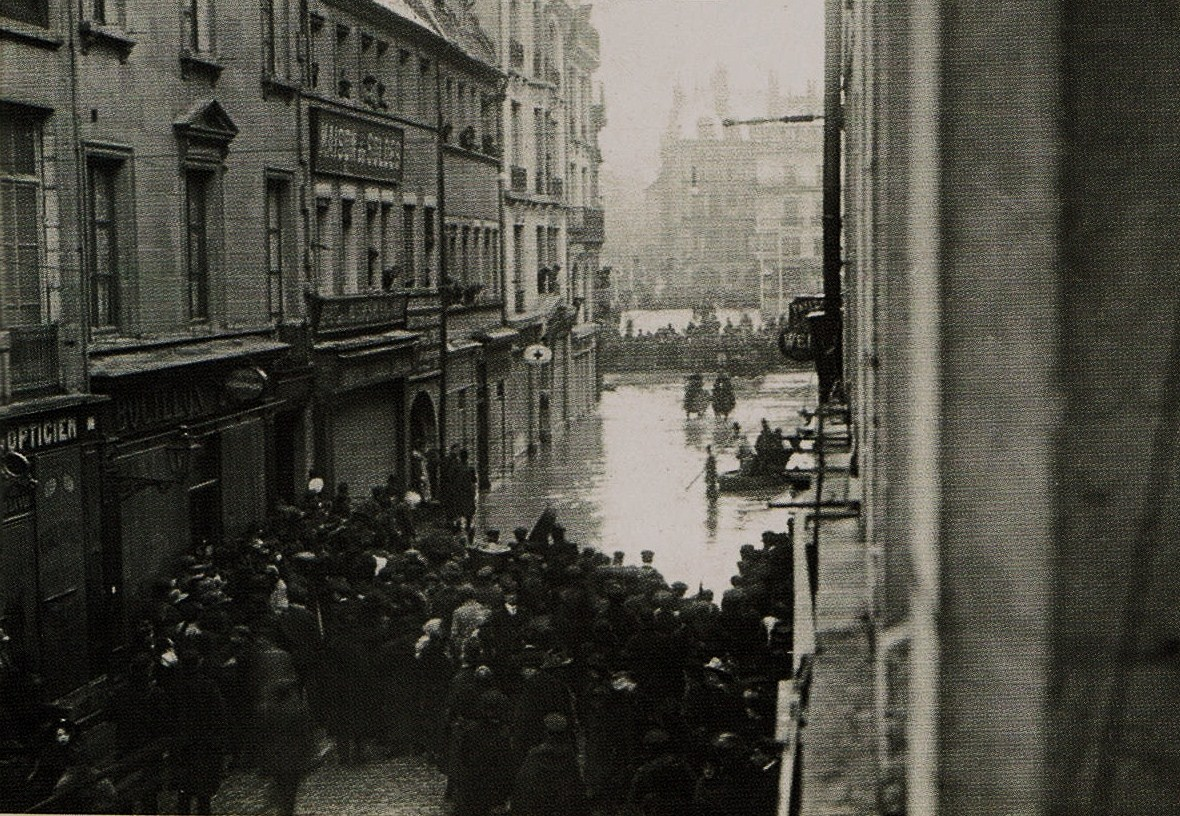
Great street of Besançon, in the beginning of the flood.

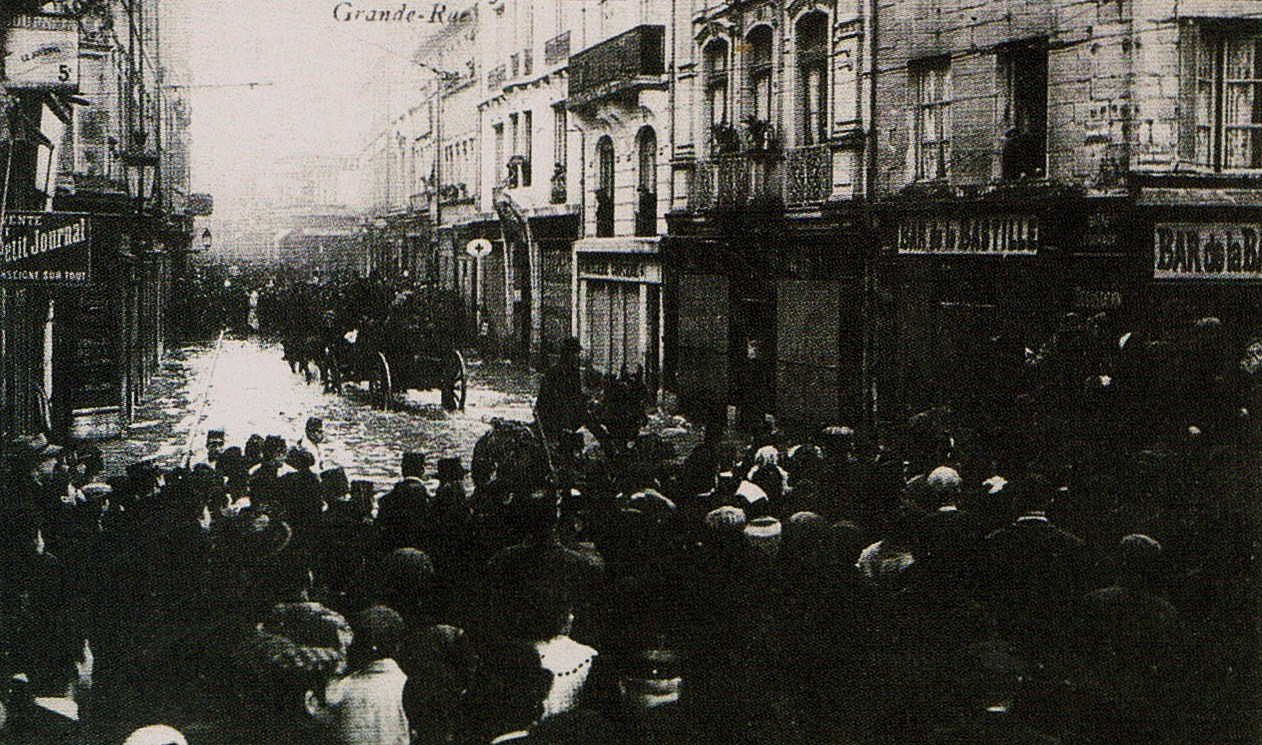
Great street of Besançon, in the beginning of the flood.

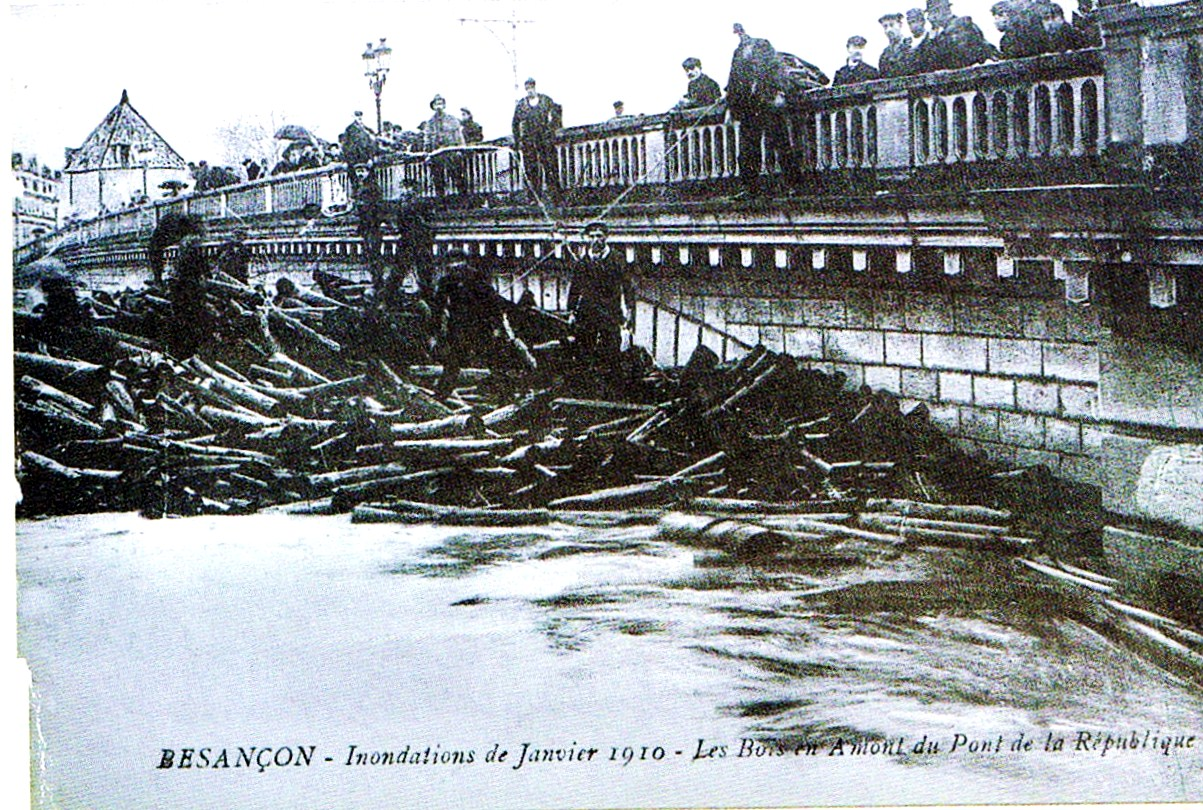
République bridge.

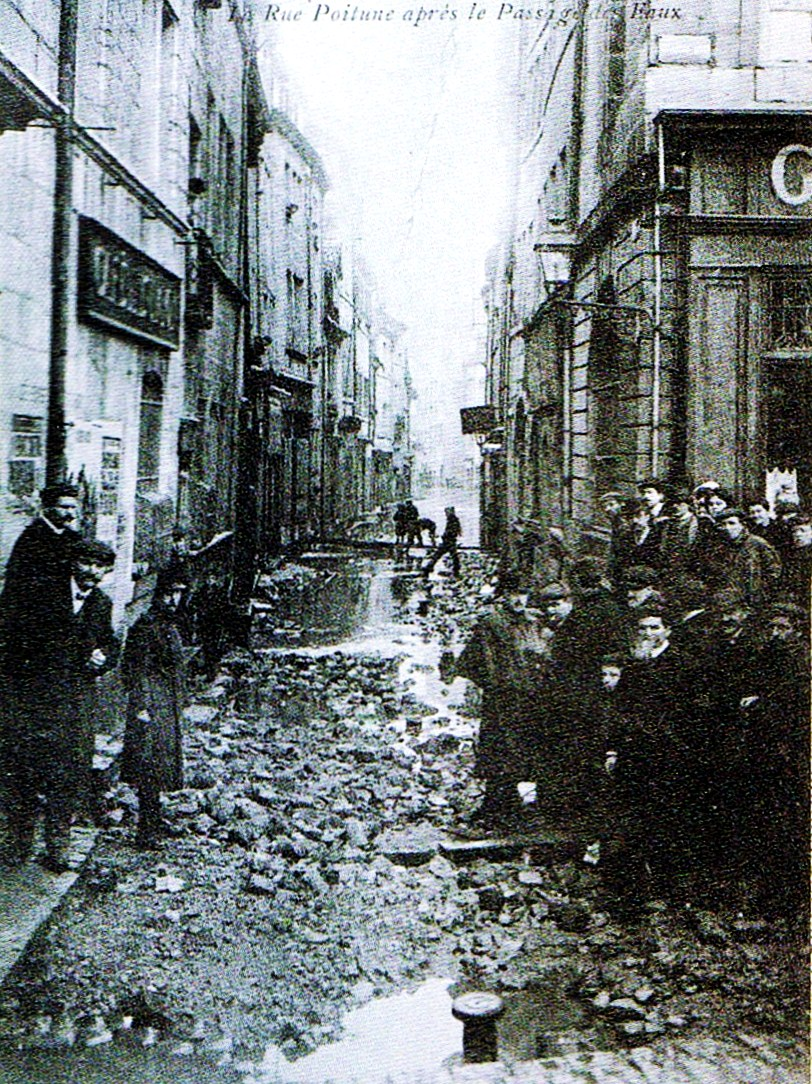
Claude Pouillet street, in the flood recession.

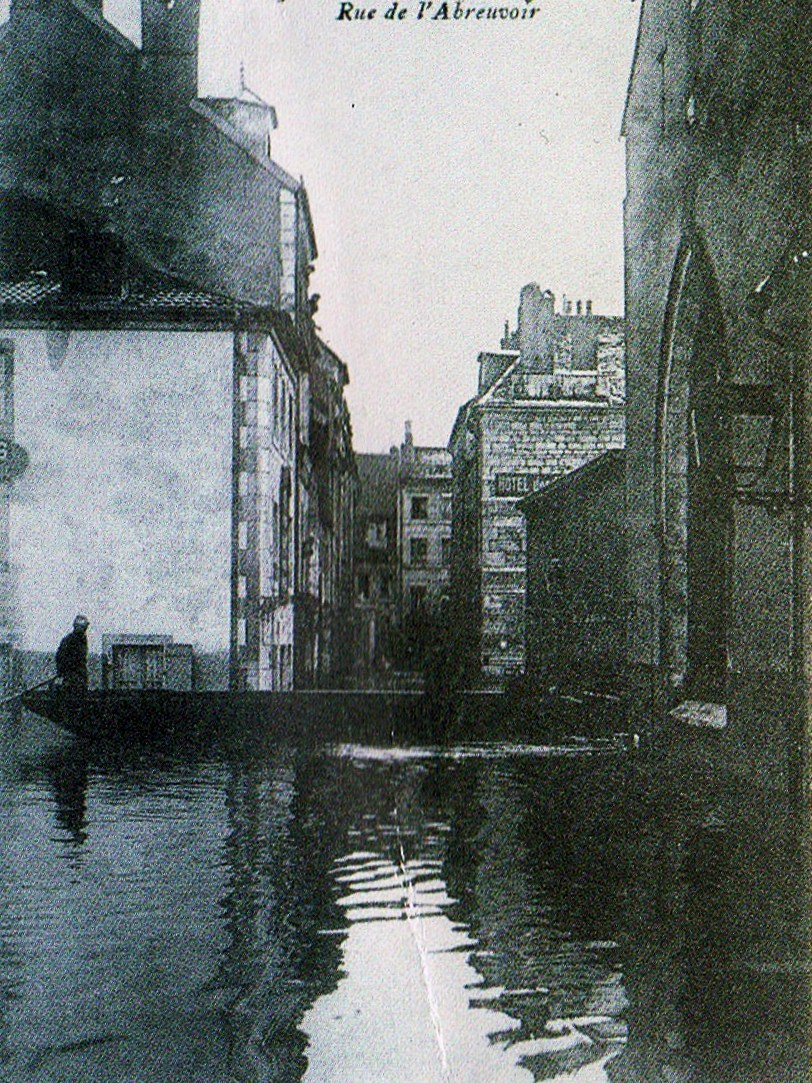
Jean Petit street.

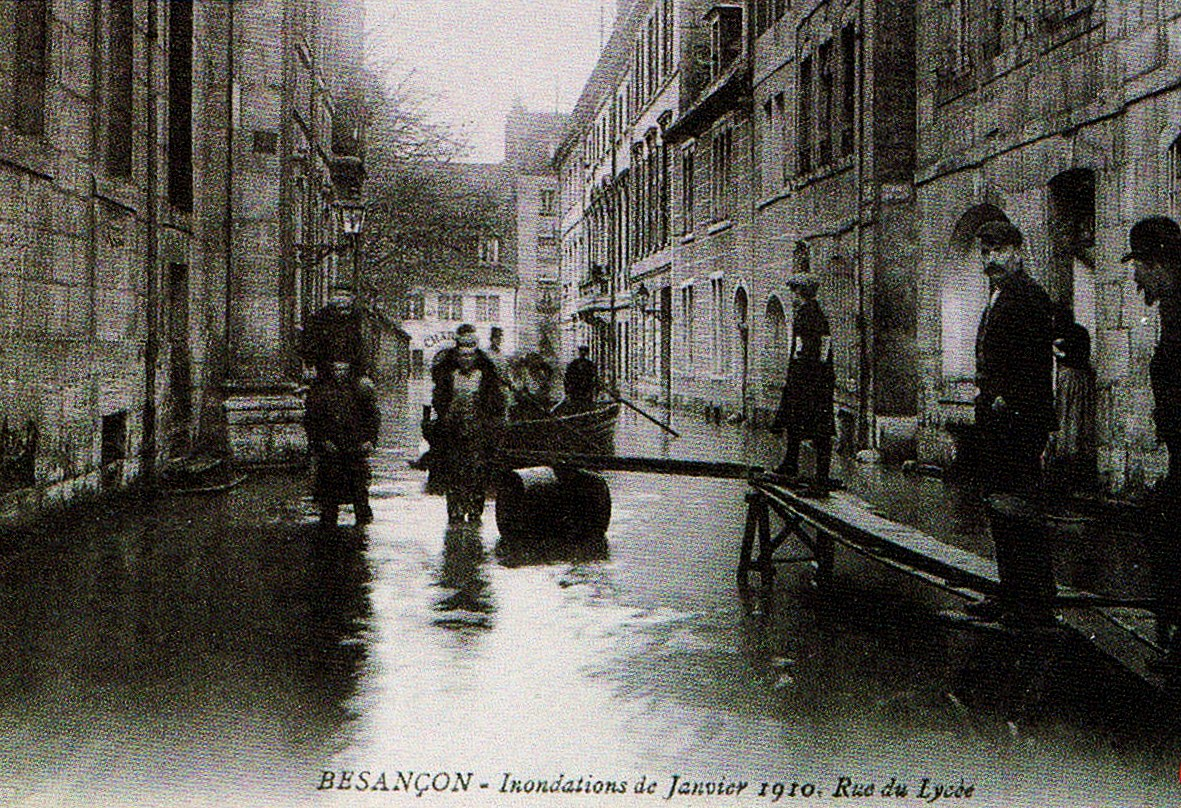
Lyceum street.

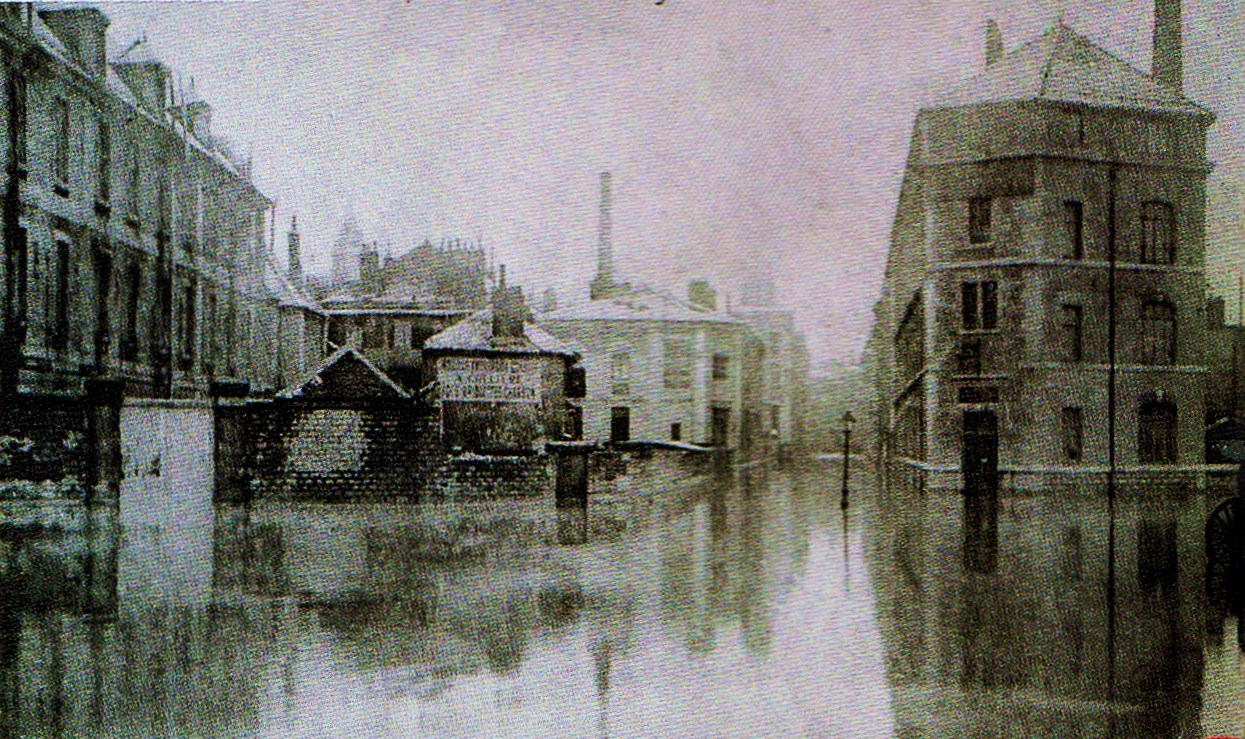
Gambetta street.

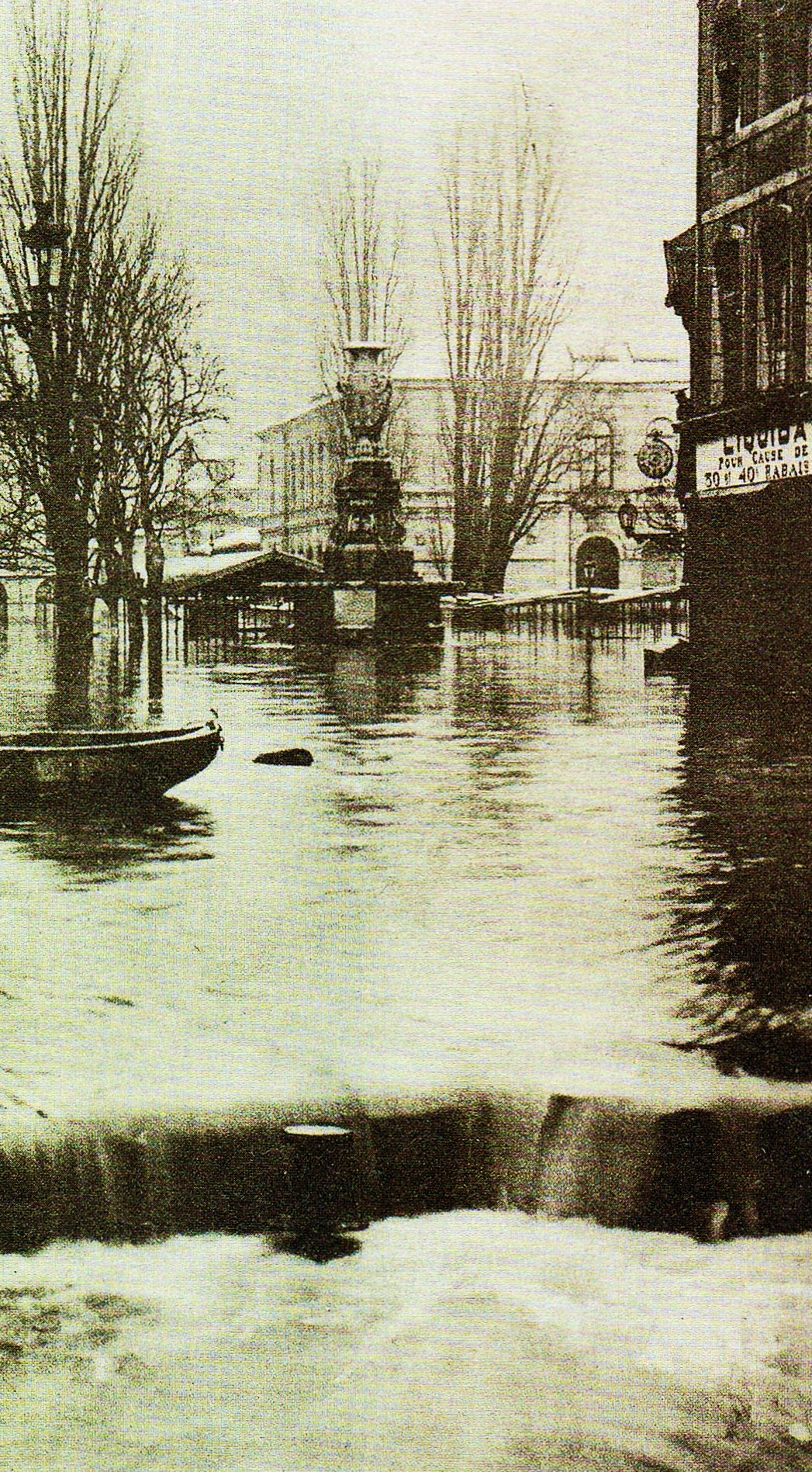
The Revolution place .

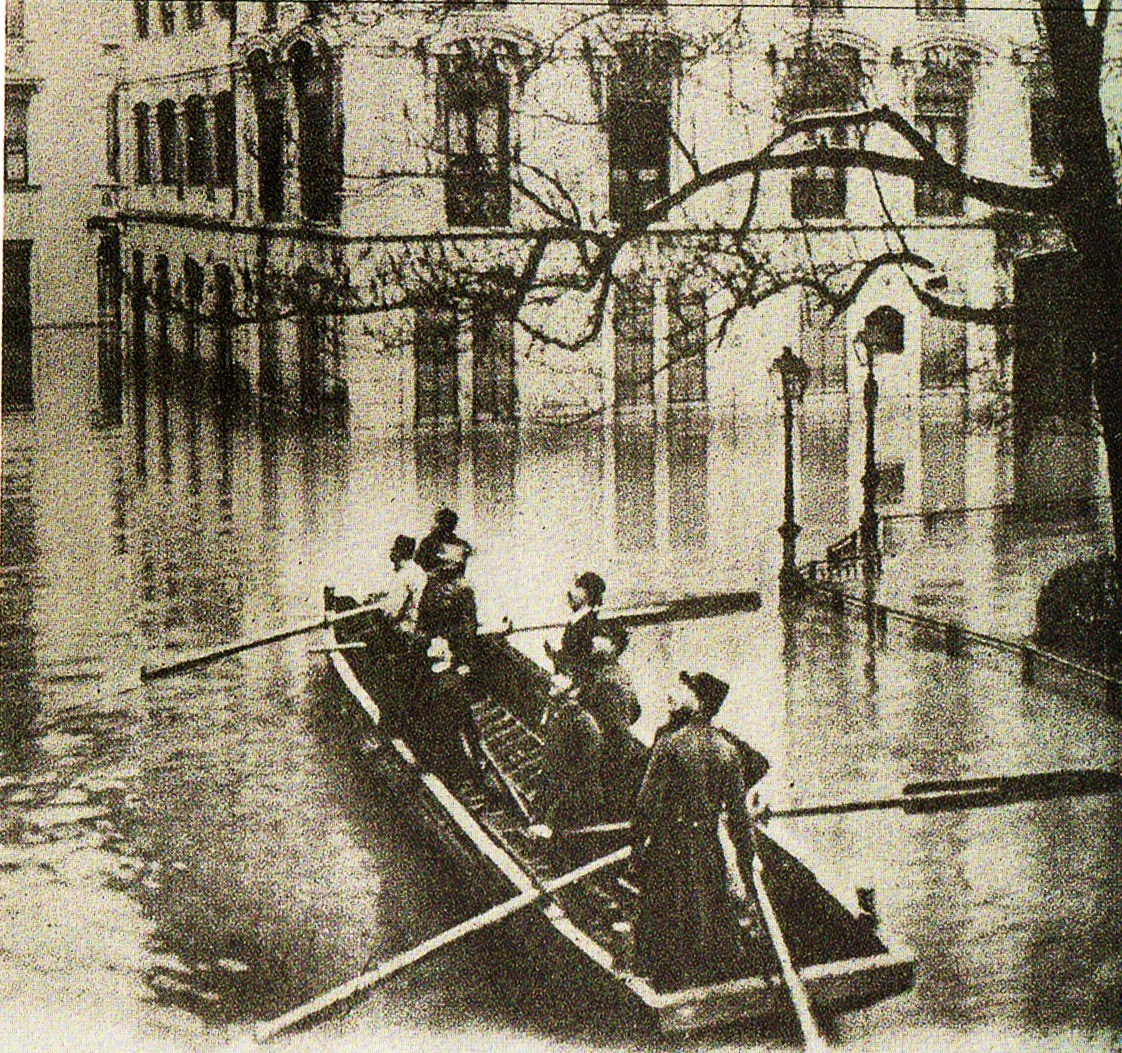
The love square.

== See also ==
- Doubs
- January 1910 Doubs river flood
- 1910 Great Flood of Paris
- 100-year flood
- Disaster
- Timeline of Besançon

== Sources ==
- Defrasne, Jean (1990). Histoire d'une ville, Besançon: le temps retrouvé (in French). University of Michigan: Cêtre. ISBN 2-901040-90-X.
- Gavignet, Jean-Pierre; Estavoyer, Lyonel (1989). Besançon autrefois (in French). Le Coteau: Horvath. ISBN 2-7171-0685-5.
- Gibert, André (1930). Les Études rhodaniennes (in French).
- Communiqué officiel de la ville de Besançon (PDF)
