= Novillars =

- Commune
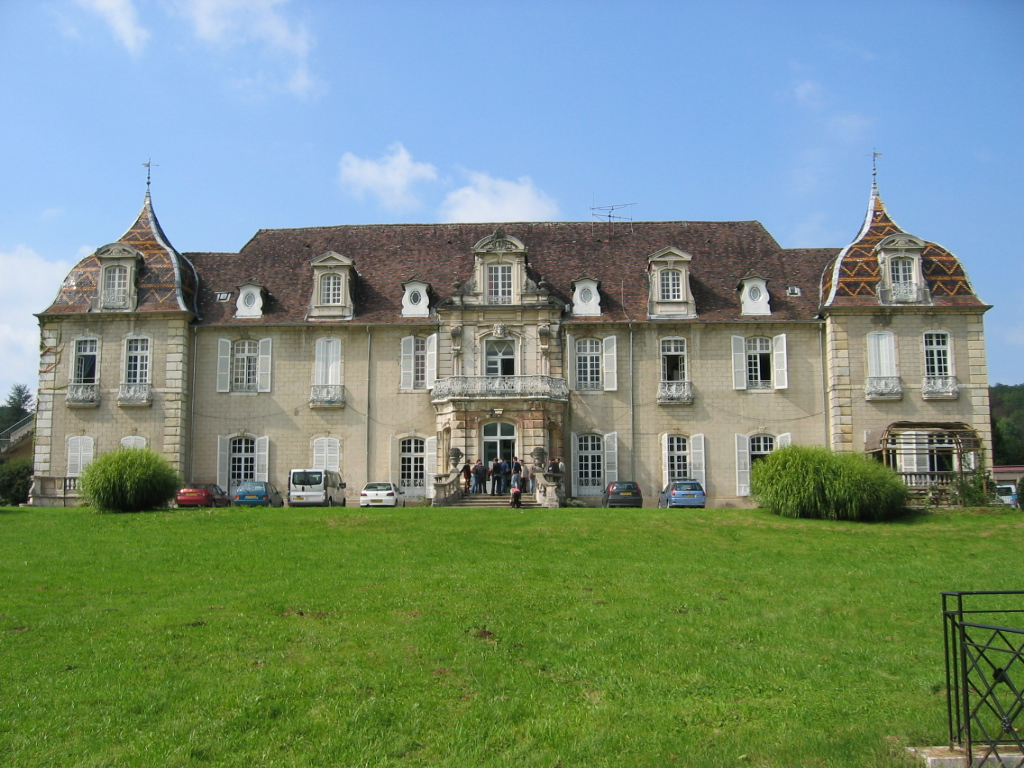
- Château de Novillars

- Coat of arms
- Location of Novillars
- Location within France Location within Bourgogne-Franche-Comté
- Coordinates: 47°17′11″N 6°07′49″E
- Country: France
- Region: Bourgogne-Franche-Comté
- Department: Doubs
- Arrondissement: Besançon
- Canton: Besançon-5
- Intercommunality: Grand Besançon Métropole

Government
  - Mayor (2024–2026): Lionel Philippe
- Area^{1}: 2.02 km^{2} (0.78 sq mi)
- Highest elevation: 335 m (1,099 ft)
- Lowest elevation: 244 m (801 ft)
- Population (2023): 1,334
  - Density: 660/km^{2} (1,710/sq mi)
- Time zone: UTC+01:00 (CET)
  - Summer (DST): UTC+02:00 (CEST)
- INSEE/Postal code: 25429 /25220
- ^{1} French Land Register data, which excludes lakes, ponds, glaciers > 1 km^{2} (0.386 sq mi or 247 acres) and river estuaries.

Novillars (French pronunciation: [nɔvilaʁ]) is a commune in the Doubs department in the Bourgogne-Franche-Comté region in eastern France.

== Geography ==
Noviallars lies 7 km (4.3 mi) northeast of Besançon.

== Population ==
Historical population
Year	Pop.	±% p.a.
1968	613	—
1975	1,803	+16.66%
1982	1,663	−1.15%
1990	1,610	−0.40%
1999	1,486	−0.89%
2007	1,612	+1.02%
2012	1,541	−0.90%
2017	1,501	−0.52%
2023	1,334	−1.95%
Source: INSEE

The opening of a psychiatric hospital in 1968 tripled the population of the village.

== See also ==
- Communes of the Doubs department
