= Lavans-lès-Dole =

Commune in Bourgogne-Franche-Comté, France

- Commune
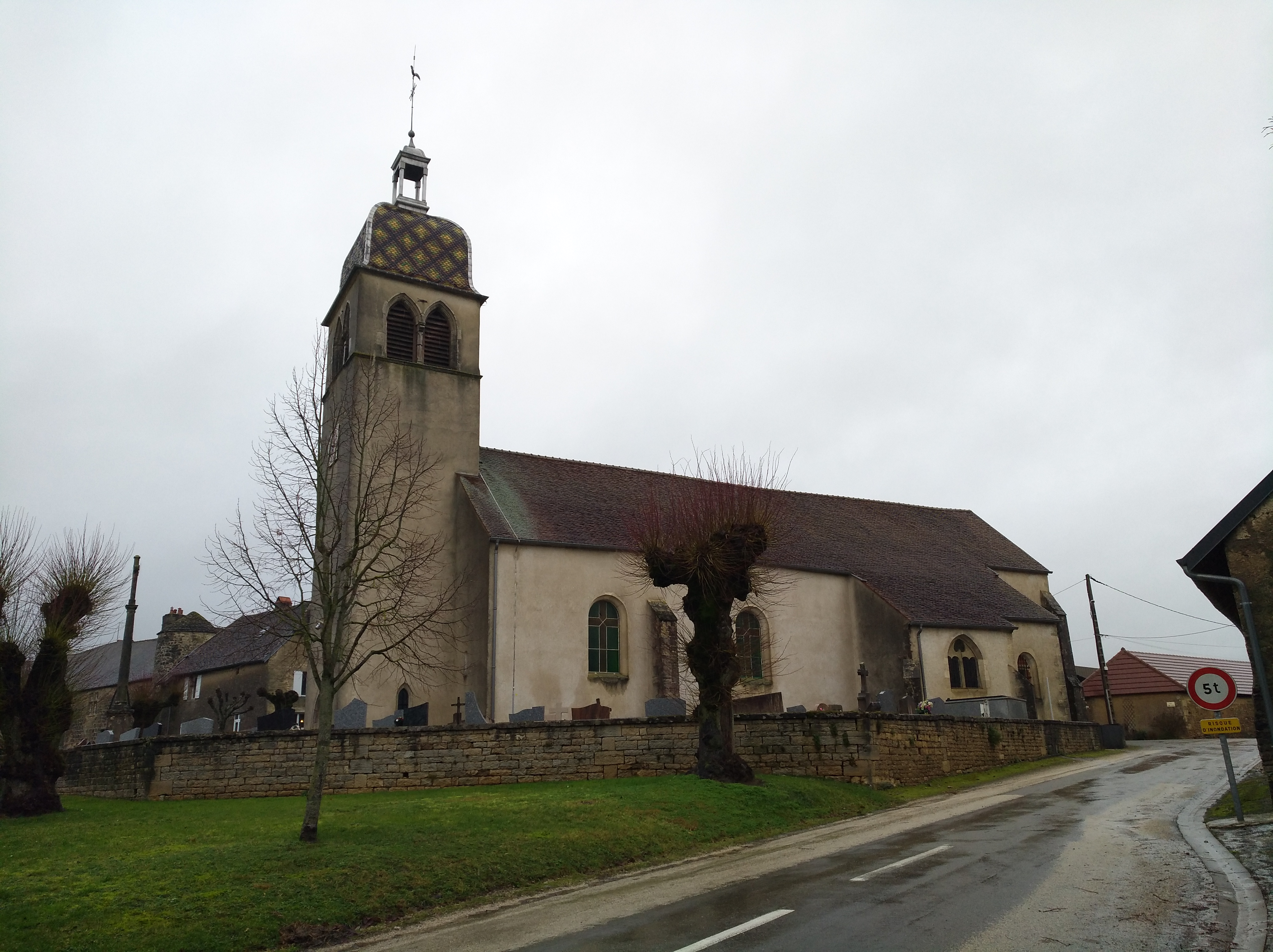
- The church in Lavans-lès-Dole

- Coat of arms
- Location of Lavans-lès-Dole
- Location within France Location within Bourgogne-Franche-Comté
- Coordinates: 47°09′23″N 5°37′39″E
- Country: France
- Region: Bourgogne-Franche-Comté
- Department: Jura
- Arrondissement: Dole
- Canton: Authume
- Intercommunality: CA Grand Dole

Government
  - Mayor (2020–2026): Micheline Henry
- Area^{1}: 10.27 km^{2} (3.97 sq mi)
- Highest elevation: 266 m (873 ft)
- Lowest elevation: 205 m (673 ft)
- Population (2023): 323
  - Density: 31.5/km^{2} (81.5/sq mi)
- Time zone: UTC+01:00 (CET)
  - Summer (DST): UTC+02:00 (CEST)
- INSEE/Postal code: 39285 /39700
- ^{1} French Land Register data, which excludes lakes, ponds, glaciers > 1 km^{2} (0.386 sq mi or 247 acres) and river estuaries.

Lavans-lès-Dole (French pronunciation: [lavɑ̃ le dɔl], literally Lavans near Dole) is a commune in the Jura department in Bourgogne-Franche-Comté in eastern France.

== Population ==
Historical population
Year	Pop.	±% p.a.
1968	176	—
1975	182	+0.48%
1982	231	+3.46%
1990	242	+0.58%
1999	265	+1.01%
2007	323	+2.50%
2012	336	+0.79%
2017	324	−0.72%
2023	323	−0.05%
Source: INSEE

== See also ==
- Communes of the Jura department
