= Charette-Varennes =

- Commune
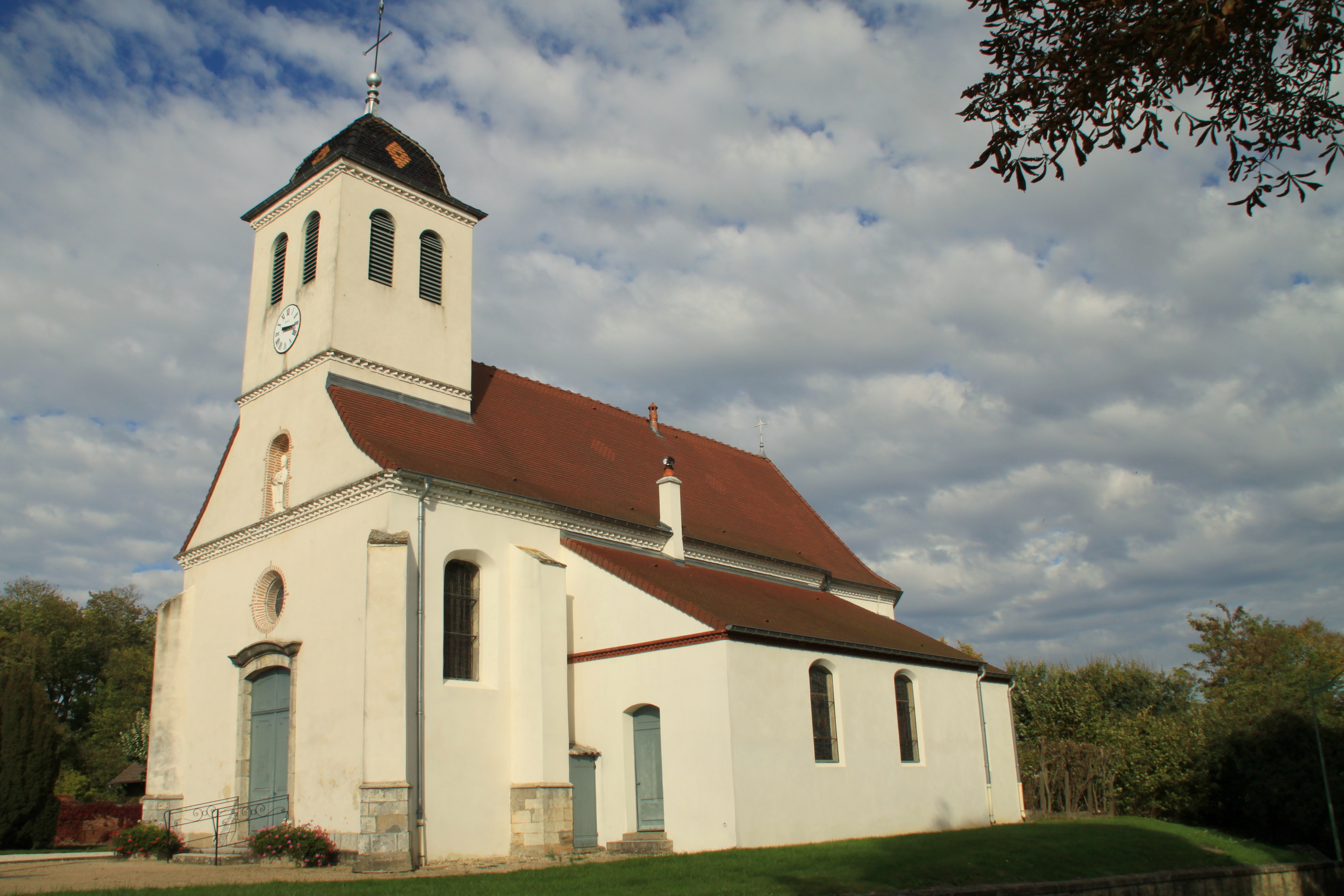
- The church in Charette
- Location of Charette-Varennes
- Location within France Location within Bourgogne-Franche-Comté
- Coordinates: 46°54′45″N 5°12′00″E
- Country: France
- Region: Bourgogne-Franche-Comté
- Department: Saône-et-Loire
- Arrondissement: Louhans
- Canton: Pierre-de-Bresse
- Area^{1}: 16.47 km^{2} (6.36 sq mi)
- Elevation: 191 m (627 ft)
- Highest elevation: 196 m (643 ft)
- Lowest elevation: 173 m (568 ft)
- Population (2023): 430
  - Density: 26/km^{2} (68/sq mi)
- Time zone: UTC+01:00 (CET)
  - Summer (DST): UTC+02:00 (CEST)
- INSEE/Postal code: 71101 /71270
- ^{1} French Land Register data, which excludes lakes, ponds, glaciers > 1 km^{2} (0.386 sq mi or 247 acres) and river estuaries.

Charette-Varennes (French pronunciation: [ʃaʁɛt vaʁɛn]) is a commune in the Saône-et-Loire department in the region of Bourgogne-Franche-Comté in eastern France.

== See also ==
- Communes of the Saône-et-Loire department
