= Deluz =

- Commune
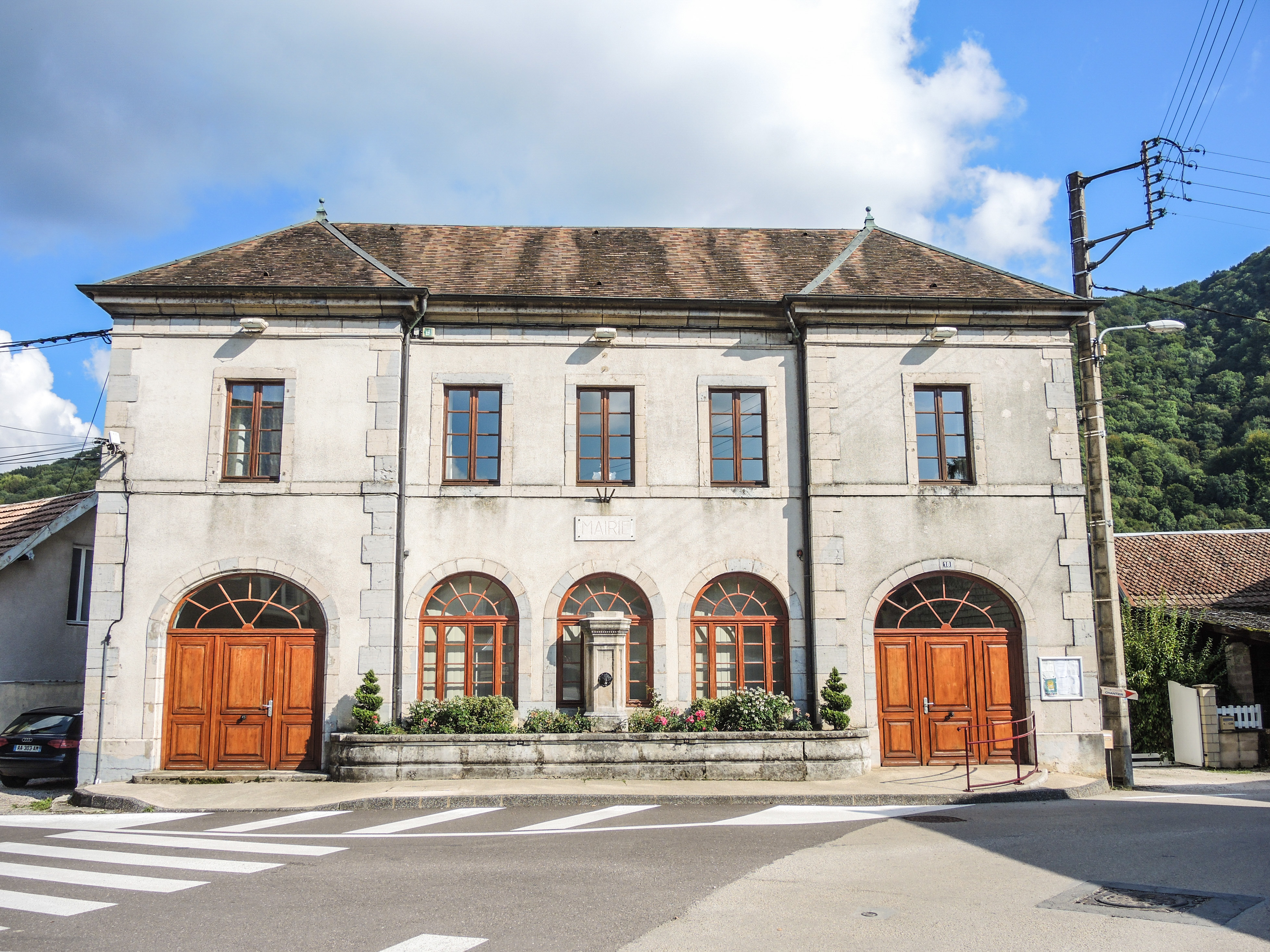
- The town hall in Deluz
- Location of Deluz
- Location within France Location within Bourgogne-Franche-Comté
- Coordinates: 47°17′43″N 6°12′05″E
- Country: France
- Region: Bourgogne-Franche-Comté
- Department: Doubs
- Arrondissement: Besançon
- Canton: Besançon-5
- Intercommunality: Grand Besançon Métropole

Government
  - Mayor (2020–2026): Sylvaine Barassi
- Area^{1}: 8.03 km^{2} (3.10 sq mi)
- Highest elevation: 581 m (1,906 ft)
- Lowest elevation: 247 m (810 ft)
- Population (2023): 630
  - Density: 78/km^{2} (200/sq mi)
- Time zone: UTC+01:00 (CET)
  - Summer (DST): UTC+02:00 (CEST)
- INSEE/Postal code: 25197 /25960
- ^{1} French Land Register data, which excludes lakes, ponds, glaciers > 1 km^{2} (0.386 sq mi or 247 acres) and river estuaries.

Deluz (French pronunciation: [dəly]) is a commune in the Doubs department in the Bourgogne-Franche-Comté region in eastern France.

The construction of the Rhône–Rhine Canal in 1821 created a narrow spit of land which, along with the water power from the weir, allowed the development of cloth spinning (1858–1872) and paper making (1873–1977). The abandoned buildings now house a small hydroelectric plant.

== Population ==
Historical population
Year	Pop.	±% p.a.
1968	646	—
1975	562	−1.97%
1982	706	+3.31%
1990	692	−0.25%
1999	693	+0.02%
2007	659	−0.63%
2012	628	−0.96%
2017	615	−0.42%
2023	630	+0.40%
Source: INSEE

== See also ==
- Communes of the Doubs department
