= Rougemontot =

- Commune
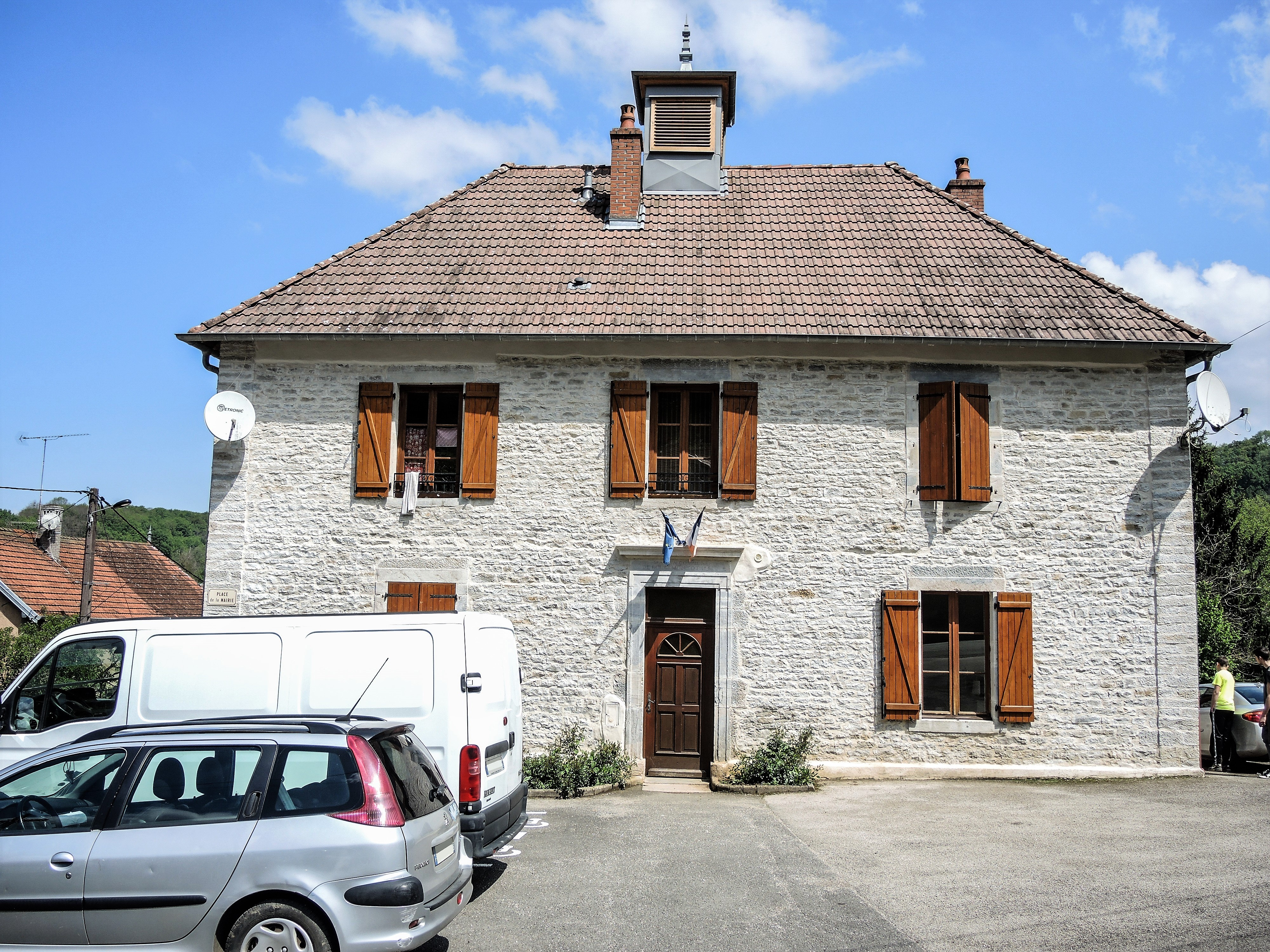
- The town hall in Rougemontot
- Location of Rougemontot
- Location within France Location within Bourgogne-Franche-Comté
- Coordinates: 47°23′54″N 6°15′48″E
- Country: France
- Region: Bourgogne-Franche-Comté
- Department: Doubs
- Arrondissement: Besançon
- Canton: Baume-les-Dames

Government
  - Mayor (2020–2026): Jacques Denis
- Area^{1}: 4.25 km^{2} (1.64 sq mi)
- Highest elevation: 474 m (1,555 ft)
- Lowest elevation: 244 m (801 ft)
- Population (2023): 87
  - Density: 20/km^{2} (53/sq mi)
- Time zone: UTC+01:00 (CET)
  - Summer (DST): UTC+02:00 (CEST)
- INSEE/Postal code: 25506 /25640
- ^{1} French Land Register data, which excludes lakes, ponds, glaciers > 1 km^{2} (0.386 sq mi or 247 acres) and river estuaries.

Rougemontot (French pronunciation: [ʁuʒmɔ̃to]) is a commune in the Doubs département in the Bourgogne-Franche-Comté region in eastern France.

== Geography ==
Rougemontot lies 18 km (11 mi) northeast of Marchaux.

== Population ==
Historical population
Year	Pop.	±% p.a.
1968	54	—
1975	59	+1.27%
1982	67	+1.83%
1990	67	+0.00%
1999	72	+0.80%
2007	93	+3.25%
2012	87	−1.32%
2017	95	+1.77%
2023	87	−1.46%
Source: INSEE

== See also ==
- Communes of the Doubs department
