= Grosbois =

- Commune
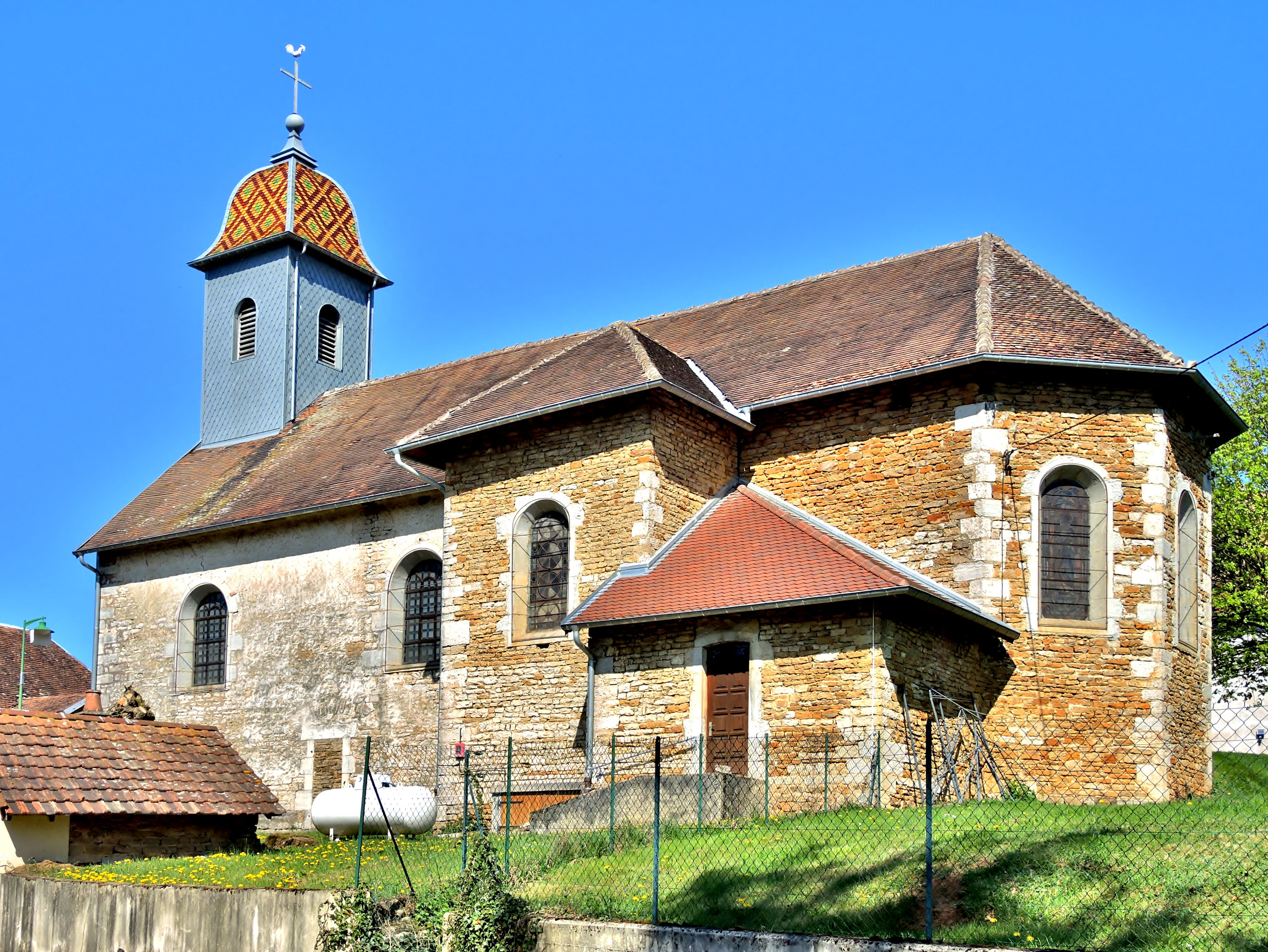
- The church in Grosbois

- Coat of arms
- Location of Grosbois
- Location within France Location within Bourgogne-Franche-Comté
- Coordinates: 47°20′40″N 6°18′25″E
- Country: France
- Region: Bourgogne-Franche-Comté
- Department: Doubs
- Arrondissement: Besançon
- Canton: Baume-les-Dames

Government
  - Mayor (2020–2026): Jean-Pierre Pernot
- Area^{1}: 2.96 km^{2} (1.14 sq mi)
- Highest elevation: 436 m (1,430 ft)
- Lowest elevation: 323 m (1,060 ft)
- Population (2023): 255
  - Density: 86.1/km^{2} (223/sq mi)
- Time zone: UTC+01:00 (CET)
  - Summer (DST): UTC+02:00 (CEST)
- INSEE/Postal code: 25298 /25110
- ^{1} French Land Register data, which excludes lakes, ponds, glaciers > 1 km^{2} (0.386 sq mi or 247 acres) and river estuaries.

Grosbois (French pronunciation: [ɡʁobwa]) is a commune in the Doubs department in the Bourgogne-Franche-Comté region in eastern France.

== Population ==
Historical population
Year	Pop.	±% p.a.
1968	79	—
1975	93	+2.36%
1982	108	+2.16%
1990	124	+1.74%
1999	191	+4.92%
2007	251	+3.47%
2012	224	−2.25%
2017	238	+1.22%
2023	255	+1.16%
Source: INSEE

== See also ==
- Communes of the Doubs department
