= Champlive =

- Commune
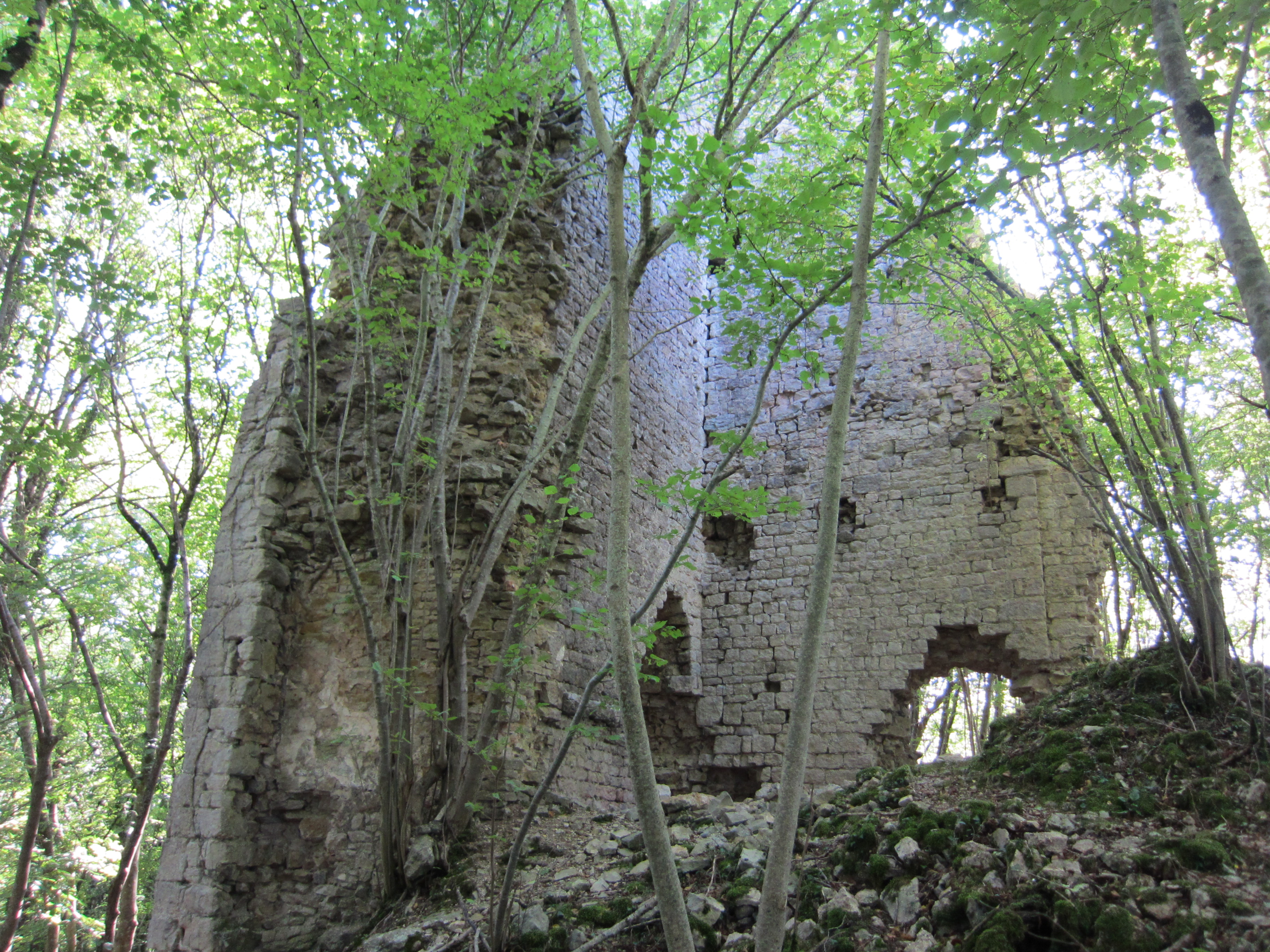
- Chateau of Vaite

- Coat of arms
- Location of Champlive
- Location within France Location within Bourgogne-Franche-Comté
- Coordinates: 47°17′23″N 6°14′49″E
- Country: France
- Region: Bourgogne-Franche-Comté
- Department: Doubs
- Arrondissement: Besançon
- Canton: Baume-les-Dames

Government
  - Mayor (2020–2026): Noëlle Lecomte
- Area^{1}: 8.2 km^{2} (3.2 sq mi)
- Highest elevation: 592 m (1,942 ft)
- Lowest elevation: 255 m (837 ft)
- Population (2023): 253
  - Density: 31/km^{2} (80/sq mi)
- Time zone: UTC+01:00 (CET)
  - Summer (DST): UTC+02:00 (CEST)
- INSEE/Postal code: 25116 /25360
- ^{1} French Land Register data, which excludes lakes, ponds, glaciers > 1 km^{2} (0.386 sq mi or 247 acres) and river estuaries.

Champlive (French pronunciation: [ʃɑ̃liv]) is a commune in the Doubs department in the Bourgogne-Franche-Comté region in eastern France.

== Population ==
Historical population
Year	Pop.	±% p.a.
1968	122	—
1975	127	+0.58%
1982	168	+4.08%
1990	192	+1.68%
1999	238	+2.42%
2007	261	+1.16%
2012	262	+0.08%
2017	248	−1.09%
2023	253	+0.33%
Source: INSEE

== See also ==
- Communes of the Doubs department
