= Adam-lès-Passavant =

- Commune
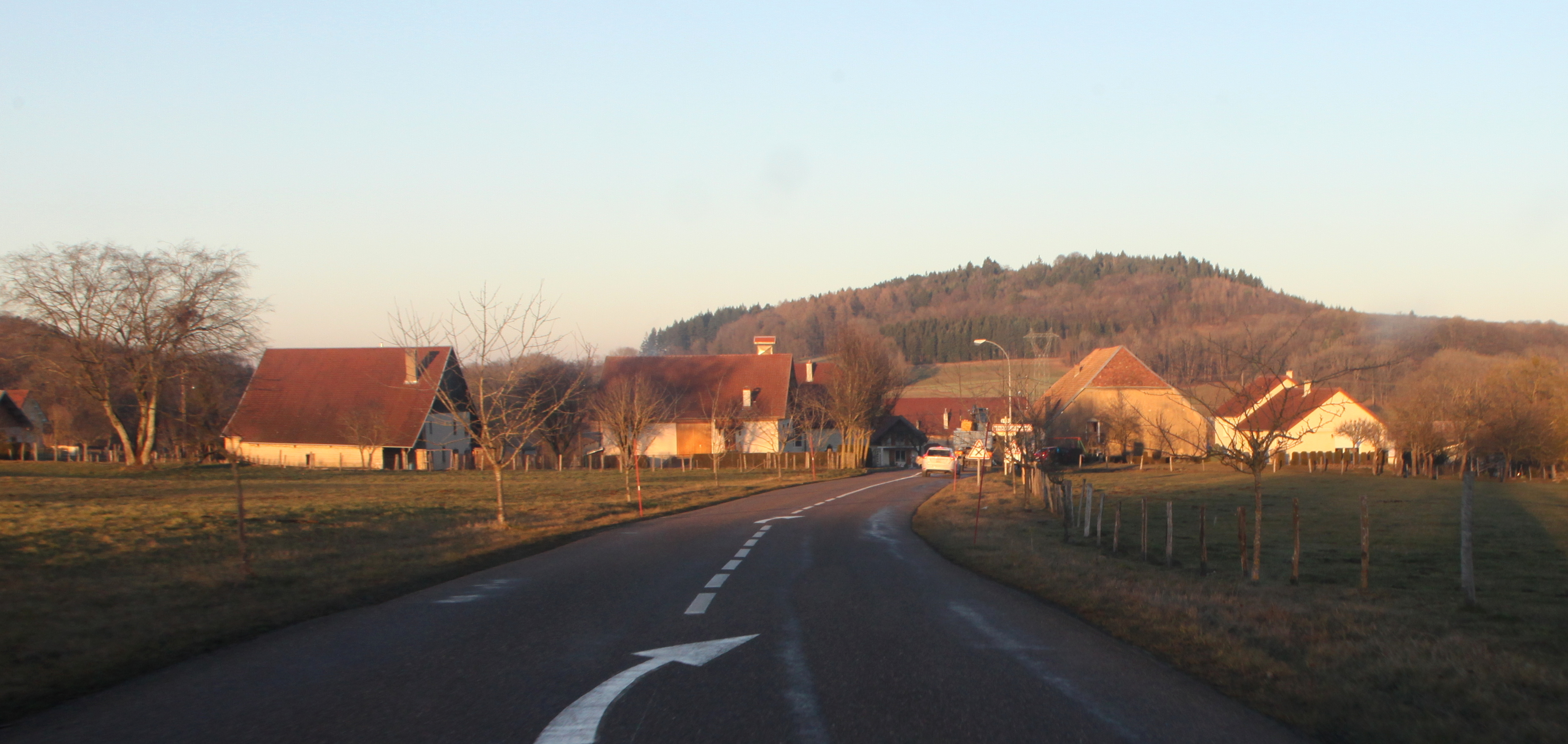
- A general view of Adam-lès-Passavant
- Location of Adam-lès-Passavant
- Location within France Location within Bourgogne-Franche-Comté
- Coordinates: 47°17′51″N 6°21′45″E
- Country: France
- Region: Bourgogne-Franche-Comté
- Department: Doubs
- Arrondissement: Besançon
- Canton: Baume-les-Dames
- Intercommunality: Doubs Baumois

Government
  - Mayor (2020–2026): Ghislaine Deleuze
- Area^{1}: 9.59 km^{2} (3.70 sq mi)
- Highest elevation: 561 m (1,841 ft)
- Lowest elevation: 310 m (1,020 ft)
- Population (2023): 88
  - Density: 9.2/km^{2} (24/sq mi)
- Time zone: UTC+01:00 (CET)
  - Summer (DST): UTC+02:00 (CEST)
- INSEE/Postal code: 25006 /25360
- ^{1} French Land Register data, which excludes lakes, ponds, glaciers > 1 km^{2} (0.386 sq mi or 247 acres) and river estuaries.

Adam-lès-Passavant (French pronunciation: [adɑ̃ lɛ pasavɑ̃], literally Adam near Passavant) is a commune in the Doubs department in the Bourgogne-Franche-Comté region in eastern France.

== Population ==
The inhabitants of Adam-lès-Passavant are known as Adams in French.

Historical population
Year	Pop.	±% p.a.
1968	65	—
1975	72	+1.47%
1982	71	−0.20%
1990	77	+1.02%
1999	77	+0.00%
2007	91	+2.11%
2012	100	+1.90%
2017	89	−2.30%
2023	88	−0.19%
Source: INSEE

== See also ==
- Communes of the Doubs department
