= Pouligney-Lusans =

- Commune
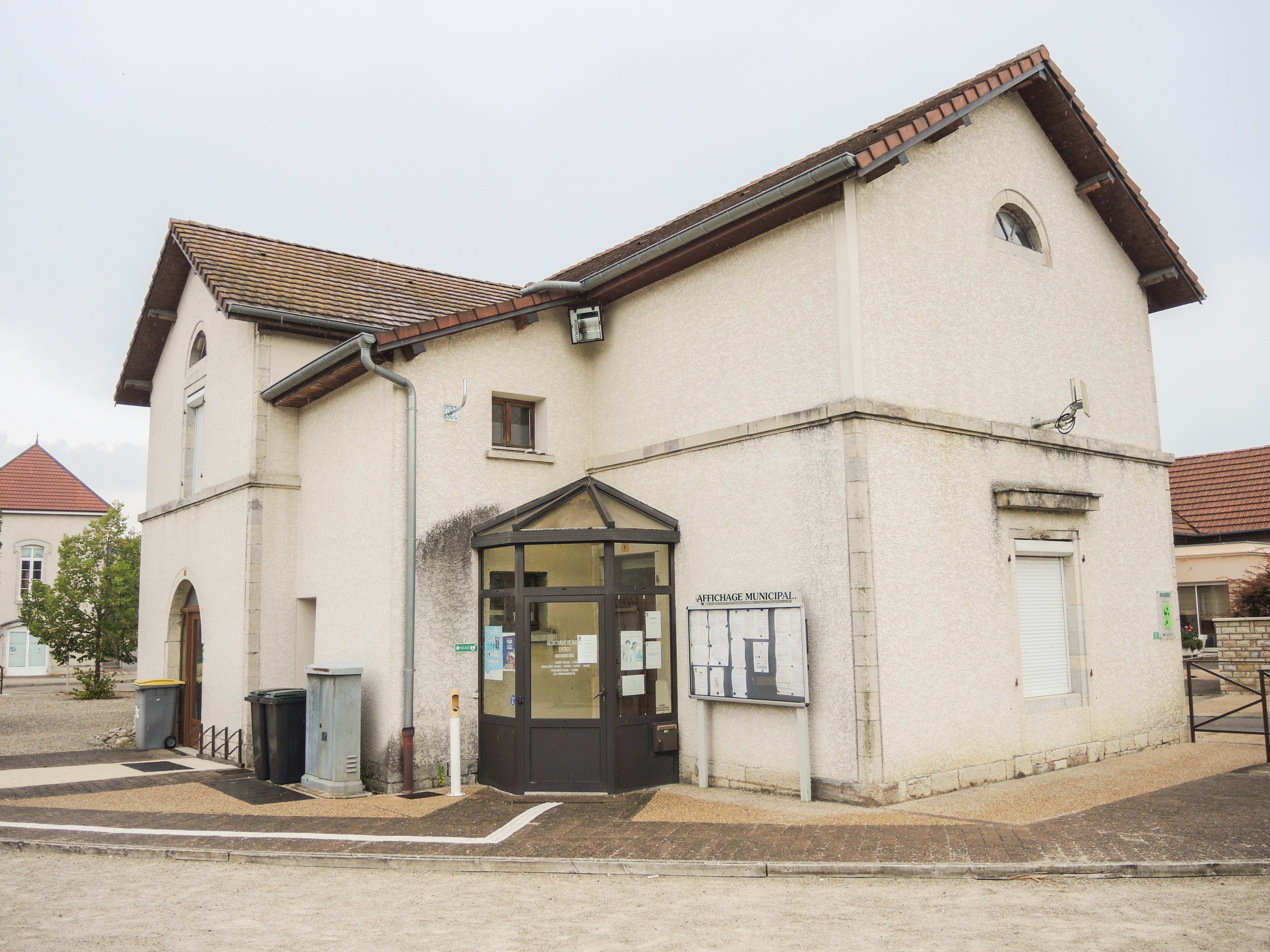
- The town hall in Pouligney
- Location of Pouligney-Lusans
- Location within France Location within Bourgogne-Franche-Comté
- Coordinates: 47°19′46″N 6°12′17″E
- Country: France
- Region: Bourgogne-Franche-Comté
- Department: Doubs
- Arrondissement: Besançon
- Canton: Baume-les-Dames

Government
  - Mayor (2023–2026): Frédéric Sikora
- Area^{1}: 11.6 km^{2} (4.5 sq mi)
- Highest elevation: 453 m (1,486 ft)
- Lowest elevation: 257 m (843 ft)
- Population (2023): 850
  - Density: 73/km^{2} (190/sq mi)
- Time zone: UTC+01:00 (CET)
  - Summer (DST): UTC+02:00 (CEST)
- INSEE/Postal code: 25468 /25640
- ^{1} French Land Register data, which excludes lakes, ponds, glaciers > 1 km^{2} (0.386 sq mi or 247 acres) and river estuaries.

Pouligney-Lusans (French pronunciation: [puliɲɛ lyzɑ̃]) is a commune in the Doubs department in the Bourgogne-Franche-Comté region in eastern France.

== Geography ==
The commune lies 3 km (1.9 mi) north of Roulans.

== Population ==
Historical population
| Year | Pop. | ±% p.a. |
|---|---|---|
| 1968 | 271 | — |
| 1975 | 326 | +2.67% |
| 1982 | 517 | +6.81% |
| 1990 | 625 | +2.40% |
| 1999 | 695 | +1.19% |
| 2007 | 745 | +0.87% |
| 2012 | 794 | +1.28% |
| 2017 | 850 | +1.37% |
| 2023 | 850 | +0.00% |
Source: INSEE

== See also ==
- Communes of the Doubs department
