= Villers-Grélot =

- Commune
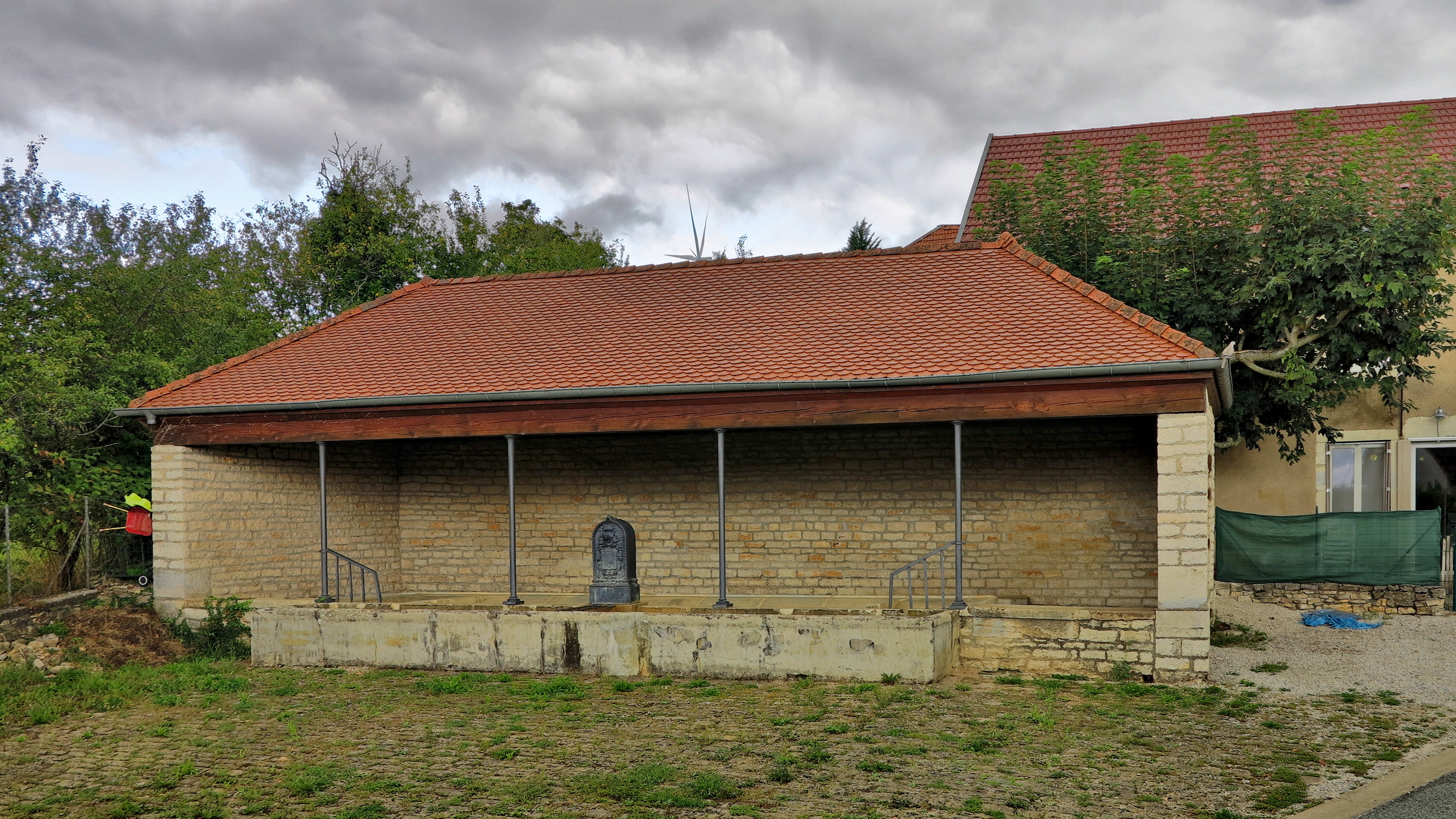
- The wash house in Villers-Grélot
- Location of Villers-Grélot
- Location within France Location within Bourgogne-Franche-Comté
- Coordinates: 47°21′27″N 6°13′39″E
- Country: France
- Region: Bourgogne-Franche-Comté
- Department: Doubs
- Arrondissement: Besançon
- Canton: Baume-les-Dames

Government
  - Mayor (2020–2026): Pascal Chaffiotte
- Area^{1}: 7.02 km^{2} (2.71 sq mi)
- Highest elevation: 509 m (1,670 ft)
- Lowest elevation: 335 m (1,099 ft)
- Population (2023): 152
  - Density: 21.7/km^{2} (56.1/sq mi)
- Time zone: UTC+01:00 (CET)
  - Summer (DST): UTC+02:00 (CEST)
- INSEE/Postal code: 25624 /25640
- ^{1} French Land Register data, which excludes lakes, ponds, glaciers > 1 km^{2} (0.386 sq mi or 247 acres) and river estuaries.

Villers-Grélot (French pronunciation: [vilɛʁ ɡʁelo]) is a commune in the Doubs department in the Bourgogne-Franche-Comté region in eastern France.

== Population ==
Historical population
Year	Pop.	±% p.a.
1968	73	—
1975	82	+1.67%
1982	101	+3.02%
1990	103	+0.25%
1999	117	+1.43%
2007	152	+3.33%
2012	154	+0.26%
2017	152	−0.26%
2023	152	+0.00%
Source: INSEE

== See also ==
- Communes of the Doubs department
