= Fourbanne =

- Commune
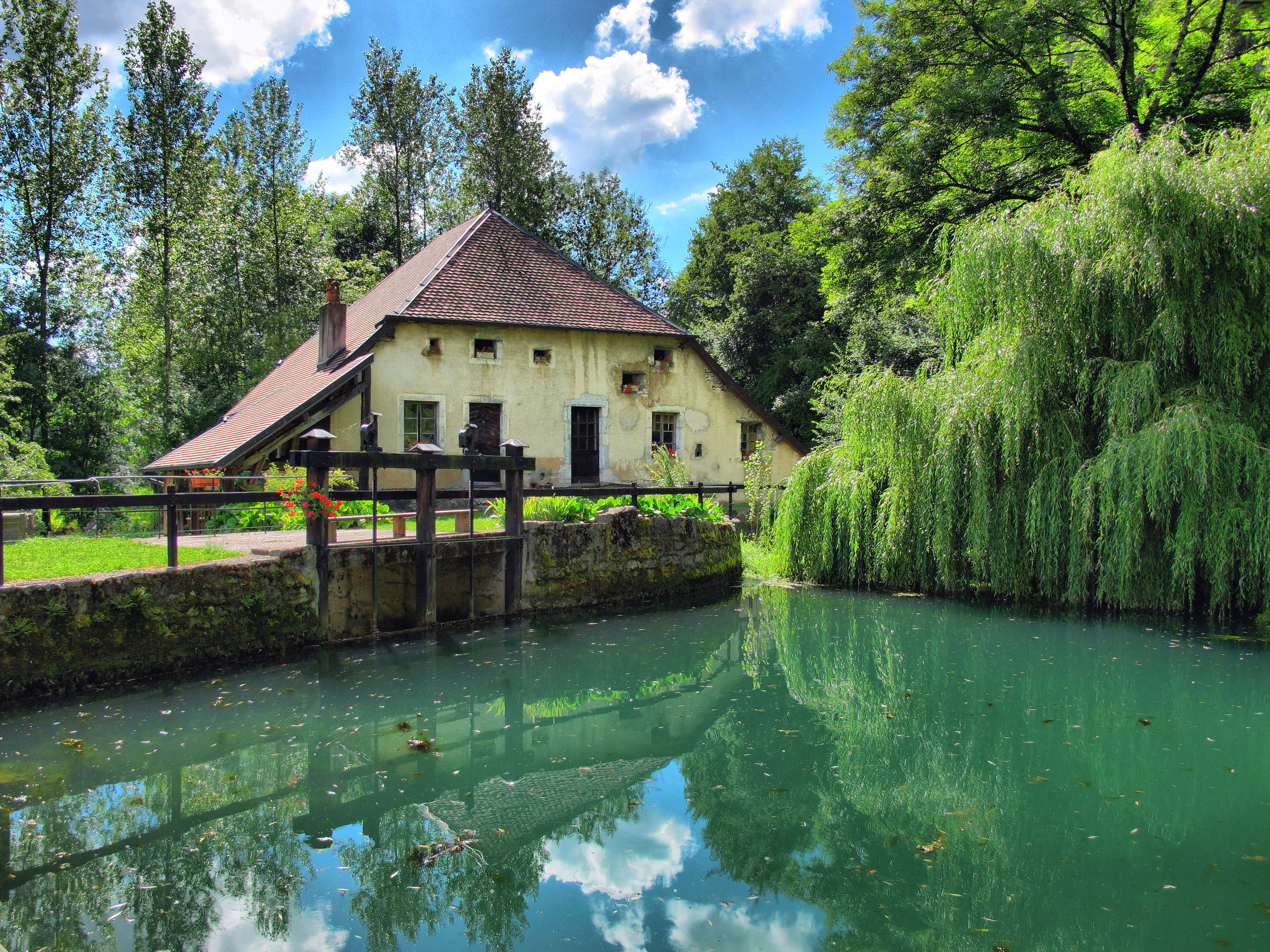
- The mill in Fourbanne
- Location of Fourbanne
- Location within France Location within Bourgogne-Franche-Comté
- Coordinates: 47°19′54″N 6°18′15″E
- Country: France
- Region: Bourgogne-Franche-Comté
- Department: Doubs
- Arrondissement: Besançon
- Canton: Baume-les-Dames

Government
  - Mayor (2020–2026): Laëtitia Journot
- Area^{1}: 1.97 km^{2} (0.76 sq mi)
- Highest elevation: 386 m (1,266 ft)
- Lowest elevation: 255 m (837 ft)
- Population (2023): 155
  - Density: 78.7/km^{2} (204/sq mi)
- Time zone: UTC+01:00 (CET)
  - Summer (DST): UTC+02:00 (CEST)
- INSEE/Postal code: 25251 /25110
- ^{1} French Land Register data, which excludes lakes, ponds, glaciers > 1 km^{2} (0.386 sq mi or 247 acres) and river estuaries.

Fourbanne (French pronunciation: [fuʁban]) is a commune in the Doubs department in the Bourgogne-Franche-Comté region in eastern France.

== Population ==
Historical population
Year	Pop.	±% p.a.
1968	38	—
1975	38	+0.00%
1982	64	+7.73%
1990	60	−0.80%
1999	96	+5.36%
2007	165	+7.00%
2012	174	+1.07%
2017	173	−0.12%
2023	155	−1.81%
Source: INSEE

== See also ==
- Communes of the Doubs department
