= Franey =

- Commune
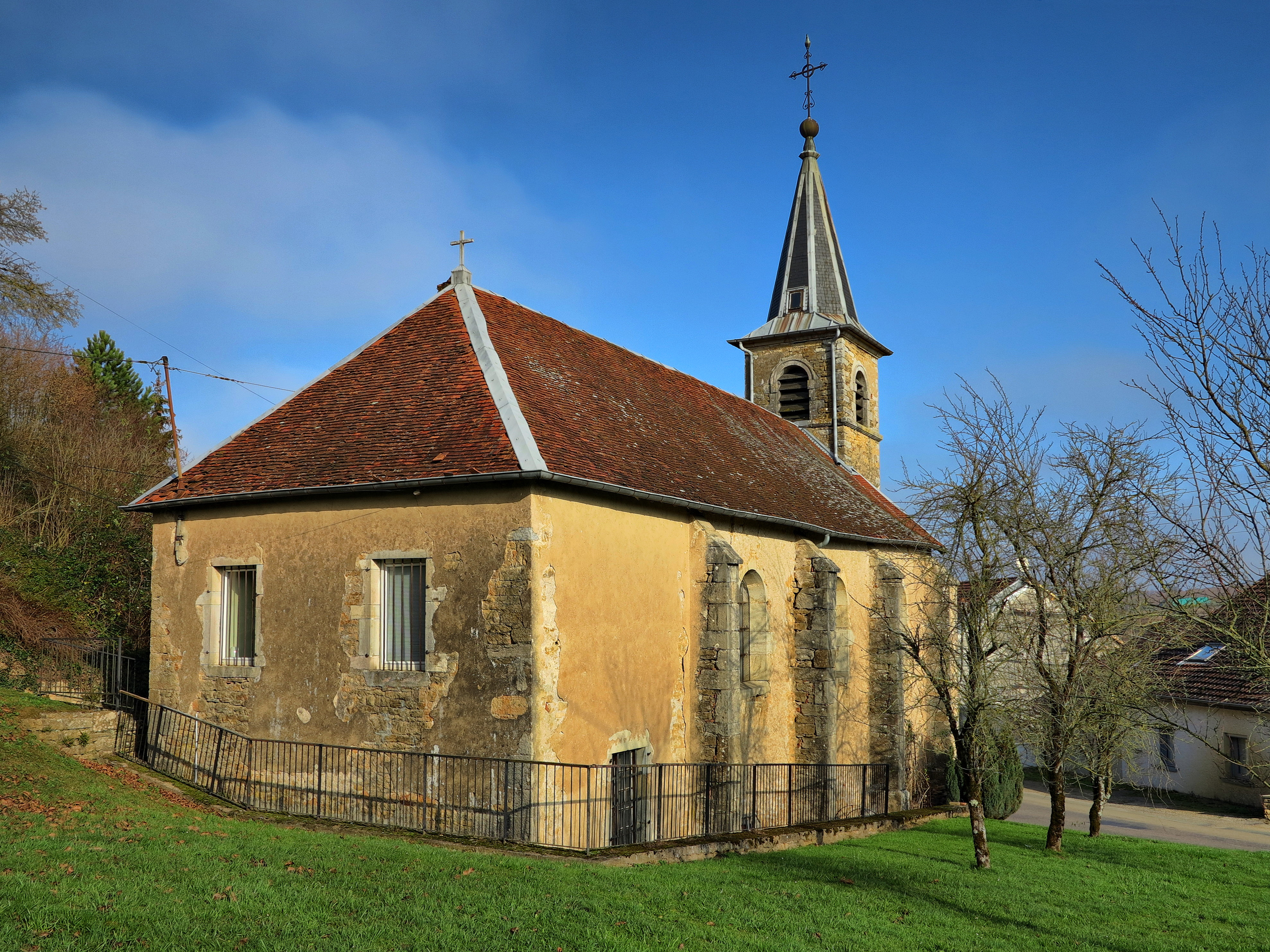
- The church-town hall in Franey
- Location of Franey
- Location within France Location within Bourgogne-Franche-Comté
- Coordinates: 47°15′45″N 5°49′07″E
- Country: France
- Region: Bourgogne-Franche-Comté
- Department: Doubs
- Arrondissement: Besançon
- Canton: Saint-Vit

Government
  - Mayor (2020–2026): Christophe Dobro
- Area^{1}: 3.38 km^{2} (1.31 sq mi)
- Highest elevation: 287 m (942 ft)
- Lowest elevation: 205 m (673 ft)
- Population (2023): 263
  - Density: 77.8/km^{2} (202/sq mi)
- Time zone: UTC+01:00 (CET)
  - Summer (DST): UTC+02:00 (CEST)
- INSEE/Postal code: 25257 /25170
- ^{1} French Land Register data, which excludes lakes, ponds, glaciers > 1 km^{2} (0.386 sq mi or 247 acres) and river estuaries.

Franey (French pronunciation: [fʁanɛ]) is a commune in the Doubs department in the Bourgogne-Franche-Comté region in eastern France.

== Population ==
Historical population
Year	Pop.	±% p.a.
1968	130	—
1975	131	+0.11%
1982	131	+0.00%
1990	180	+4.05%
1999	239	+3.20%
2007	279	+1.95%
2012	295	+1.12%
2017	272	−1.61%
2023	263	−0.56%
Source: INSEE

== See also ==
- Communes of the Doubs department
