= Silley-Bléfond =

- Commune
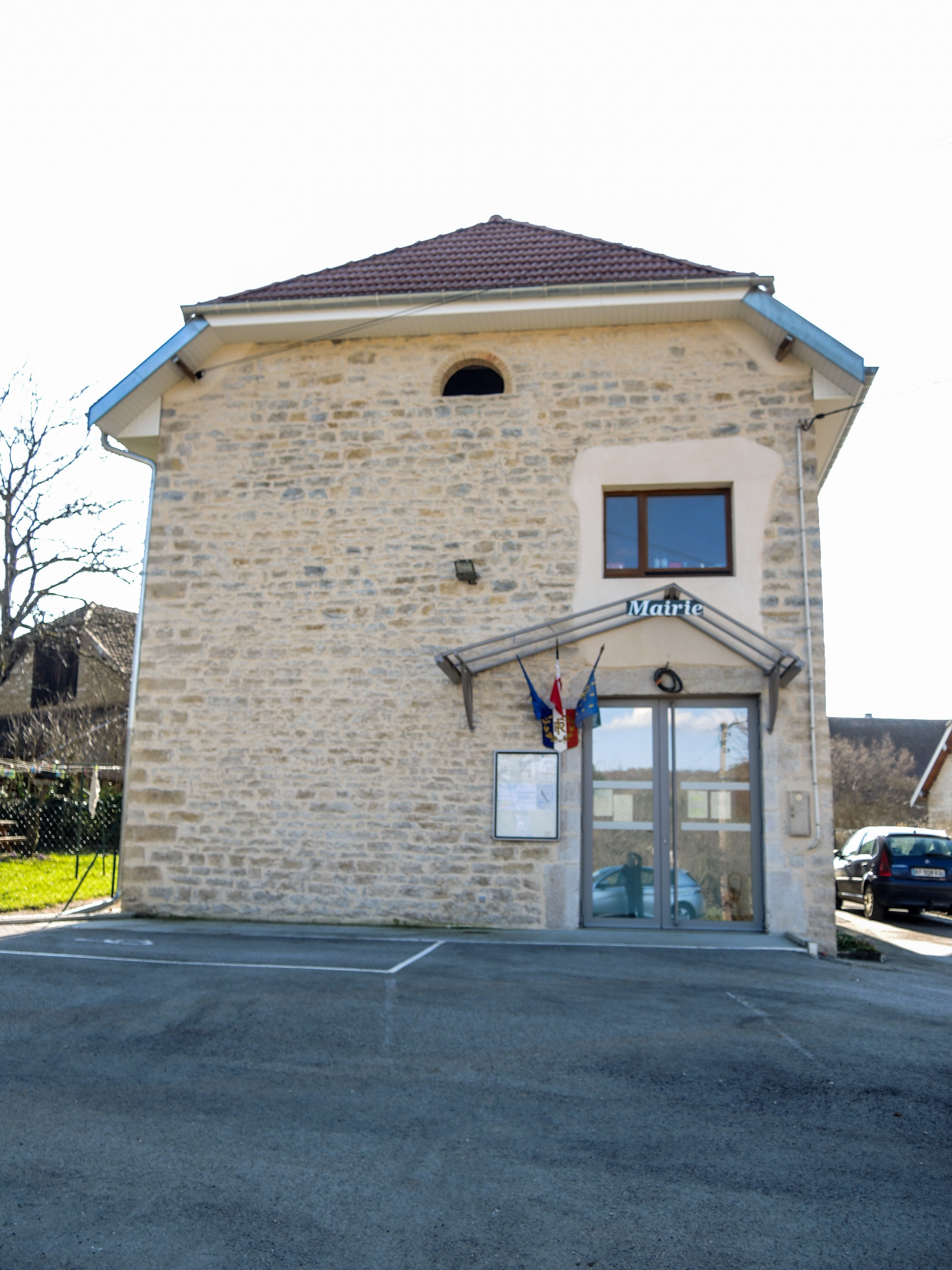
- The town hall in Silley-Bléfond
- Location of Silley-Bléfond
- Location within France Location within Bourgogne-Franche-Comté
- Coordinates: 47°19′27″N 6°19′37″E
- Country: France
- Region: Bourgogne-Franche-Comté
- Department: Doubs
- Arrondissement: Besançon
- Canton: Baume-les-Dames

Government
  - Mayor (2020–2026): Jean-Pierre Comte
- Area^{1}: 4.34 km^{2} (1.68 sq mi)
- Highest elevation: 569 m (1,867 ft)
- Lowest elevation: 290 m (950 ft)
- Population (2023): 54
  - Density: 12/km^{2} (32/sq mi)
- Time zone: UTC+01:00 (CET)
  - Summer (DST): UTC+02:00 (CEST)
- INSEE/Postal code: 25546 /25110
- ^{1} French Land Register data, which excludes lakes, ponds, glaciers > 1 km^{2} (0.386 sq mi or 247 acres) and river estuaries.

Silley-Bléfond (French pronunciation: [sijɛ blefɔ̃]) is a commune in the Doubs department in the Bourgogne-Franche-Comté region in eastern France.

== Geography ==
The commune lies 5 km (3.1 mi) southwest of Baume-les-Dames.

== Population ==
Historical population
Year	Pop.	±% p.a.
1968	62	—
1975	57	−1.19%
1982	57	+0.00%
1990	47	−2.38%
1999	59	+2.56%
2007	71	+2.34%
2012	61	−2.99%
2017	56	−1.70%
2023	54	−0.60%
Source: INSEE

== See also ==
- Communes of the Doubs department
