= Tallans =

- Commune
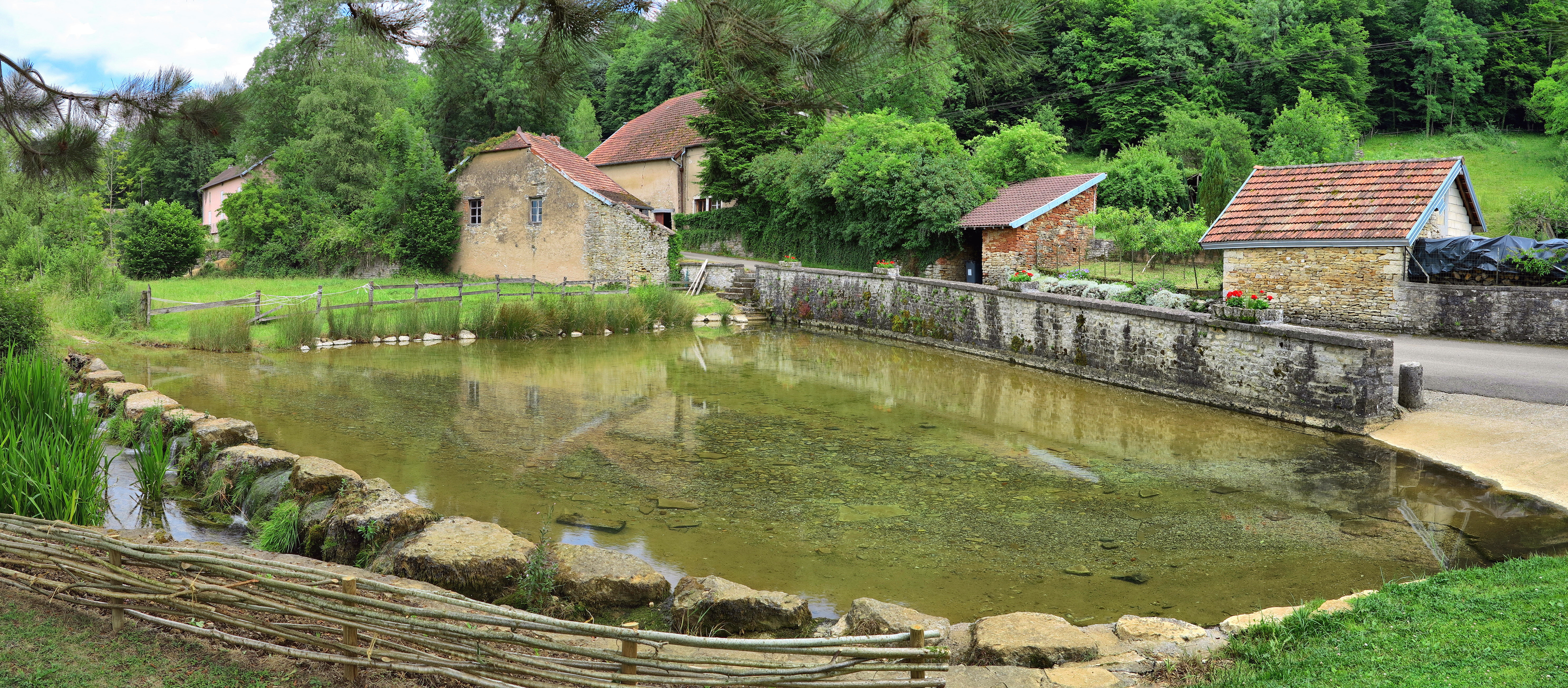
- The spring in Tallans
- Location of Tallans
- Location within France Location within Bourgogne-Franche-Comté
- Coordinates: 47°25′16″N 6°17′20″E
- Country: France
- Region: Bourgogne-Franche-Comté
- Department: Doubs
- Arrondissement: Besançon
- Canton: Baume-les-Dames
- Intercommunality: Deux Vallées Vertes

Government
  - Mayor (2022–2026): Marie Hélène Evrard
- Area^{1}: 4.05 km^{2} (1.56 sq mi)
- Highest elevation: 431 m (1,414 ft)
- Lowest elevation: 245 m (804 ft)
- Population (2023): 47
  - Density: 12/km^{2} (30/sq mi)
- Time zone: UTC+01:00 (CET)
  - Summer (DST): UTC+02:00 (CEST)
- INSEE/Postal code: 25556 /25680
- ^{1} French Land Register data, which excludes lakes, ponds, glaciers > 1 km^{2} (0.386 sq mi or 247 acres) and river estuaries.

Tallans (French pronunciation: [talɑ̃]) is a commune in the Doubs department in the Bourgogne-Franche-Comté region in eastern France.

== Geography ==
Tallans lies 10 km (6.2 mi) southwest of Rougemont.

== Population ==
Historical population
Year	Pop.	±% p.a.
1968	13	—
1975	20	+6.35%
1982	31	+6.46%
1990	25	−2.65%
1999	26	+0.44%
2007	33	+3.02%
2012	50	+8.67%
2017	47	−1.23%
2023	47	+0.00%
Source: INSEE

== See also ==
- Communes of the Doubs department
