= Mésandans =

- Commune
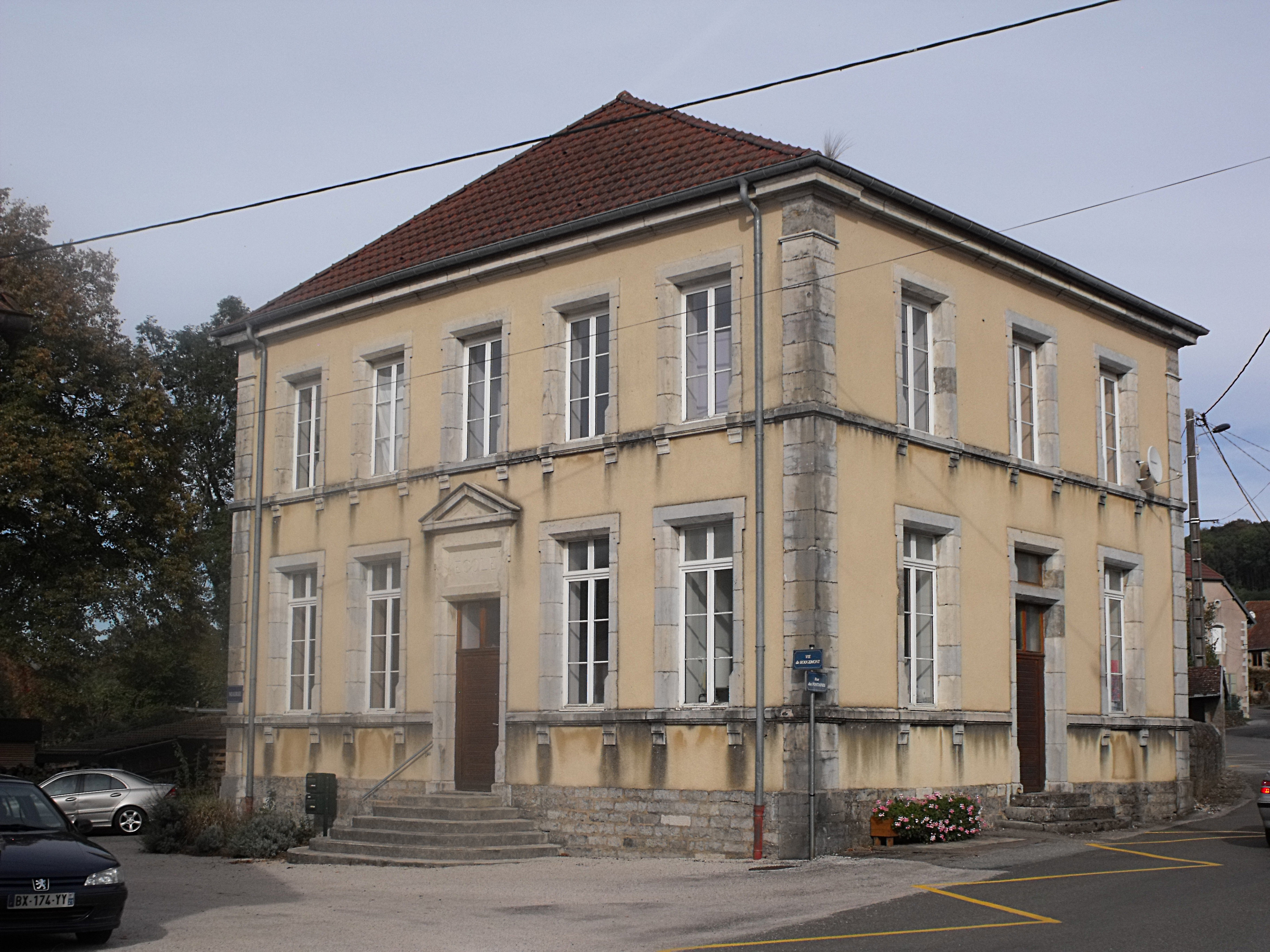
- The school in Mésandans
- Location of Mésandans
- Location within France Location within Bourgogne-Franche-Comté
- Coordinates: 47°25′54″N 6°22′11″E
- Country: France
- Region: Bourgogne-Franche-Comté
- Department: Doubs
- Arrondissement: Besançon
- Canton: Baume-les-Dames

Government
  - Mayor (2020–2026): Joseph Cuenot
- Area^{1}: 5.66 km^{2} (2.19 sq mi)
- Highest elevation: 467 m (1,532 ft)
- Lowest elevation: 305 m (1,001 ft)
- Population (2023): 233
  - Density: 41.2/km^{2} (107/sq mi)
- Time zone: UTC+01:00 (CET)
  - Summer (DST): UTC+02:00 (CEST)
- INSEE/Postal code: 25377 /25680
- ^{1} French Land Register data, which excludes lakes, ponds, glaciers > 1 km^{2} (0.386 sq mi or 247 acres) and river estuaries.

Mésandans (French pronunciation: [mezɑ̃dɑ̃]) is a commune in the Doubs département in the Bourgogne-Franche-Comté region in eastern France.

== Geography ==
The commune lies 7 km (4.3 mi) south of Rougemont.

== Population ==
Historical population
Year	Pop.	±% p.a.
1968	110	—
1975	98	−1.64%
1982	89	−1.37%
1990	105	+2.09%
1999	121	+1.59%
2007	148	+2.55%
2012	215	+7.75%
2017	222	+0.64%
2023	233	+0.81%
Source: INSEE

== See also ==
- Communes of the Doubs department
