= Recologne, Doubs =

Recologne
- Commune
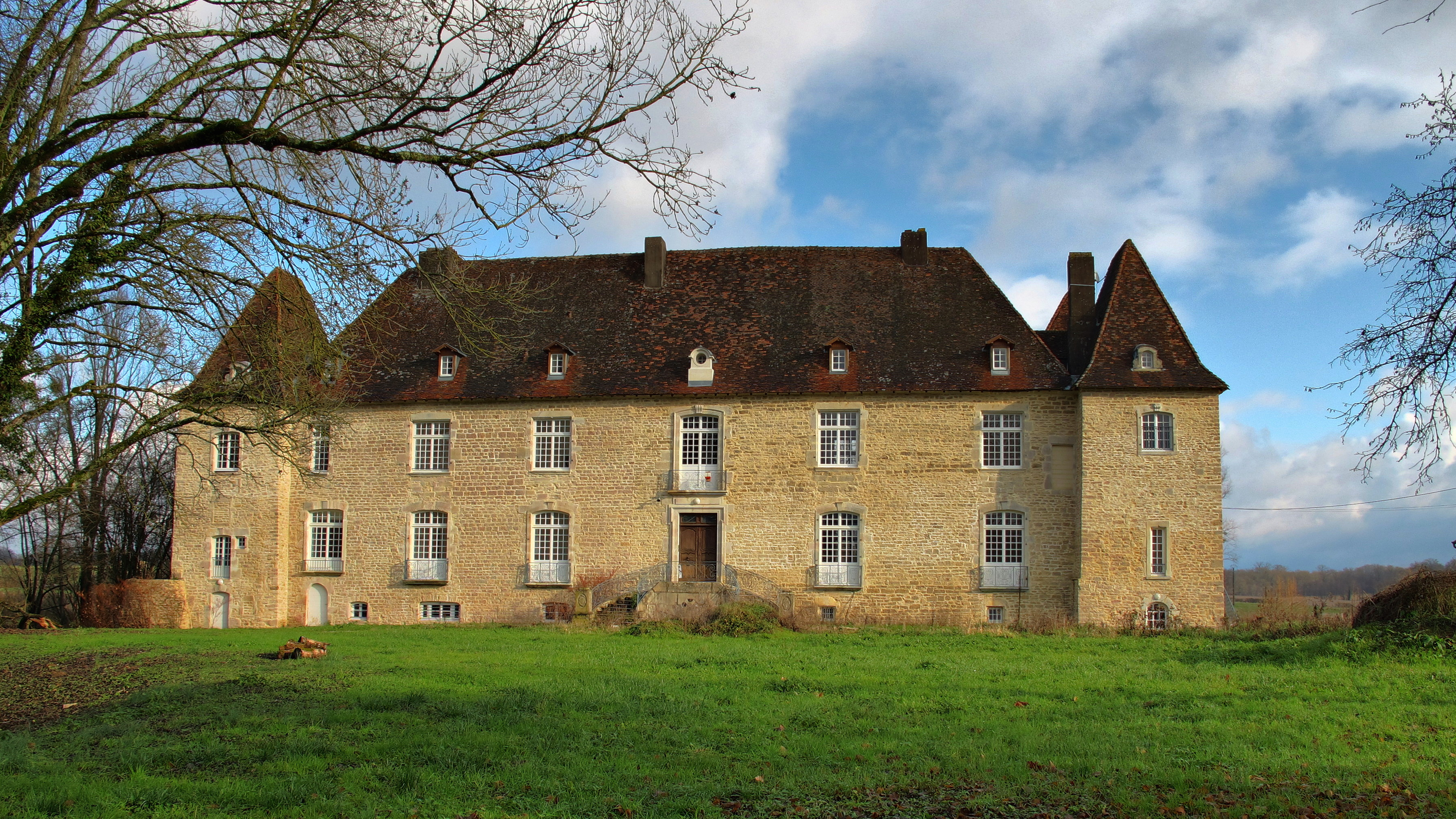
- The chateau in Recologne

- Coat of arms
- Location of Recologne
- Location within France Location within Bourgogne-Franche-Comté
- Coordinates: 47°16′25″N 5°49′51″E
- Country: France
- Region: Bourgogne-Franche-Comté
- Department: Doubs
- Arrondissement: Besançon
- Canton: Saint-Vit

Government
  - Mayor (2023–2026): Daniel Meyer
- Area^{1}: 6.78 km^{2} (2.62 sq mi)
- Elevation: 230 m (750 ft)
- Highest elevation: 268 m (879 ft)
- Lowest elevation: 201 m (659 ft)
- Population (2023): 730
  - Density: 110/km^{2} (280/sq mi)
- Time zone: UTC+01:00 (CET)
  - Summer (DST): UTC+02:00 (CEST)
- INSEE/Postal code: 25482 /25170
- ^{1} French Land Register data, which excludes lakes, ponds, glaciers > 1 km^{2} (0.386 sq mi or 247 acres) and river estuaries.

Recologne (French pronunciation: [ʁəkɔlɔɲ]) is a commune in the Doubs département in the Bourgogne-Franche-Comté region in eastern France.

== Population ==
Historical population
Year	Pop.	±% p.a.
1968	256	—
1975	337	+4.01%
1982	392	+2.18%
1990	482	+2.62%
1999	508	+0.59%
2007	551	+1.02%
2012	616	+2.26%
2017	653	+1.17%
2023	730	+1.88%
Source: INSEE

== See also ==
- Communes of the Doubs department
