= Ollans =

- Commune
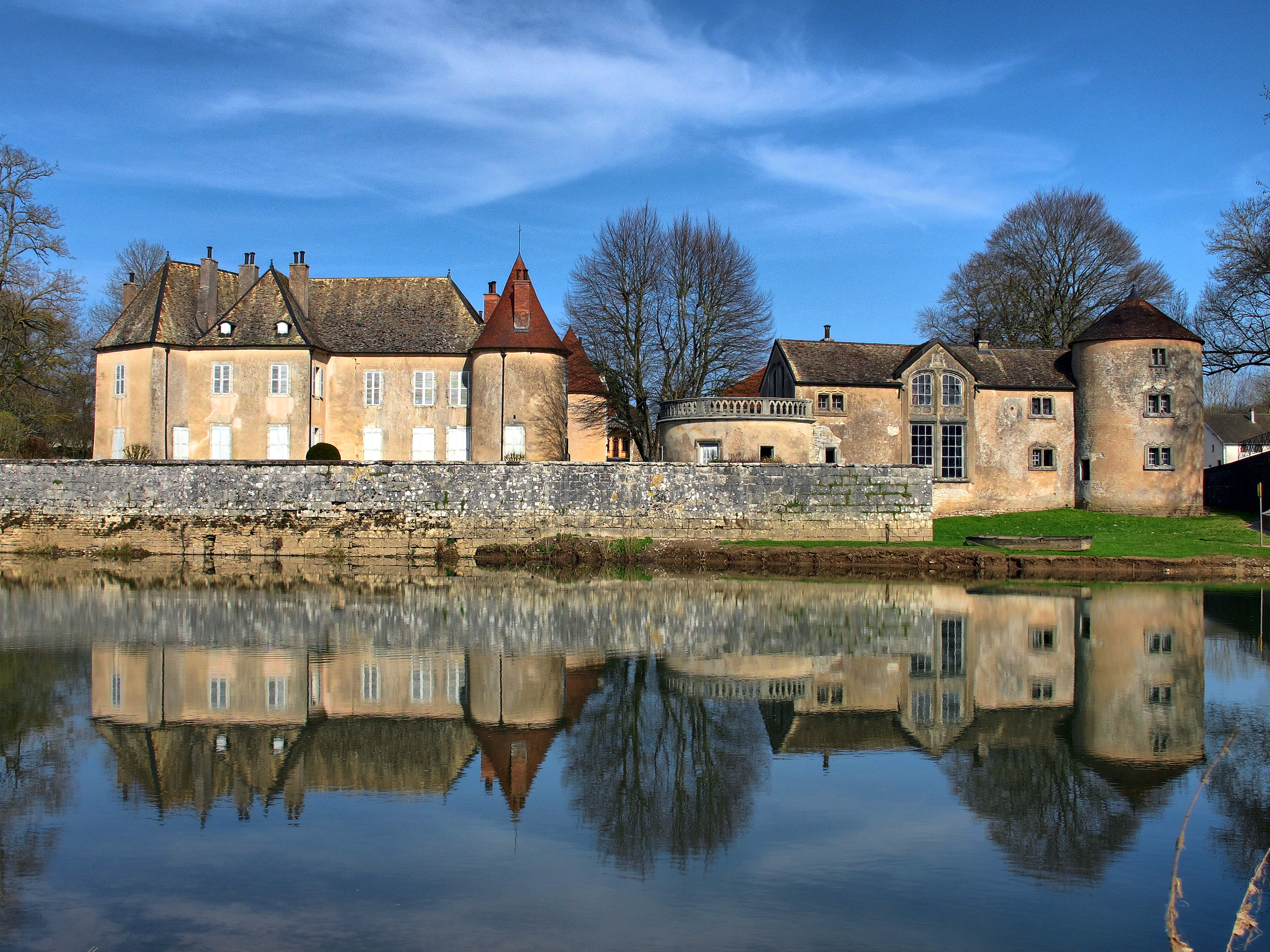
- Chateau

- Coat of arms
- Location of Ollans
- Location within France Location within Bourgogne-Franche-Comté
- Coordinates: 47°25′06″N 6°14′44″E
- Country: France
- Region: Bourgogne-Franche-Comté
- Department: Doubs
- Arrondissement: Besançon
- Canton: Baume-les-Dames

Government
  - Mayor (2020–2026): Michel Lab
- Area^{1}: 2.31 km^{2} (0.89 sq mi)
- Highest elevation: 297 m (974 ft)
- Lowest elevation: 234 m (768 ft)
- Population (2023): 43
  - Density: 19/km^{2} (48/sq mi)
- Time zone: UTC+01:00 (CET)
  - Summer (DST): UTC+02:00 (CEST)
- INSEE/Postal code: 25430 /25640
- ^{1} French Land Register data, which excludes lakes, ponds, glaciers > 1 km^{2} (0.386 sq mi or 247 acres) and river estuaries.

Ollans (French pronunciation: [ɔlɑ̃]) is a commune in the Doubs department in the Bourgogne-Franche-Comté region in eastern France.

== Geography ==
Ollans lies 20 km (12 mi) north of Marchaux on the border of the department of Haute-Saône. It is situated on the Ognon, which forms the border between the two departments.

== Population ==
Historical population
Year	Pop.	±% p.a.
1968	45	—
1975	55	+2.91%
1982	52	−0.80%
1990	53	+0.24%
1999	54	+0.21%
2007	44	−2.53%
2012	41	−1.40%
2017	39	−1.00%
2023	43	+1.64%
Source: INSEE

== See also ==
- Communes of the Doubs department
