= La Bretenière, Doubs =

La Bretenière
- Commune
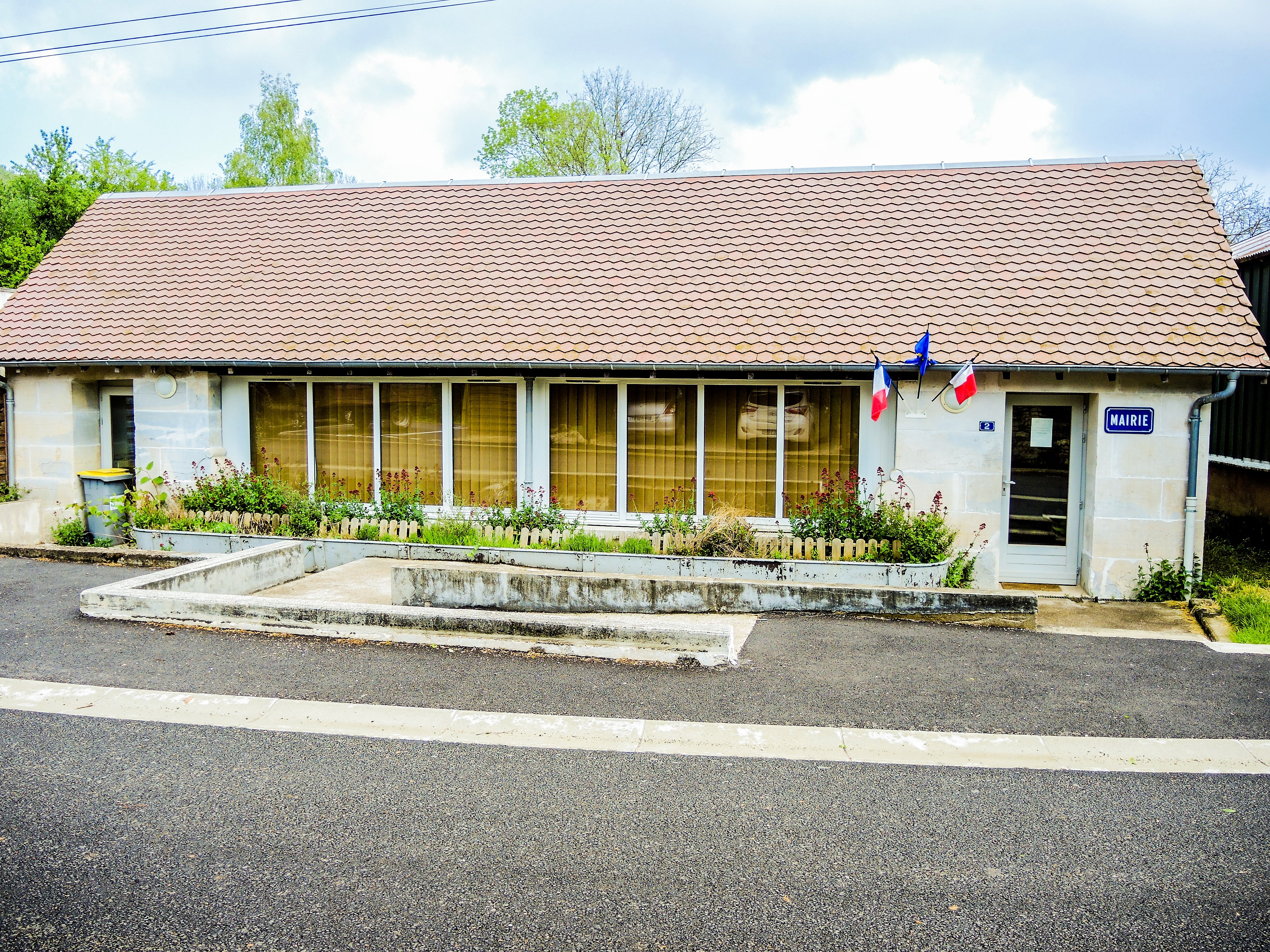
- The town hall in La Bretenière
- Location of La Bretenière
- Location within France Location within Bourgogne-Franche-Comté
- Coordinates: 47°22′54″N 6°16′31″E
- Country: France
- Region: Bourgogne-Franche-Comté
- Department: Doubs
- Arrondissement: Besançon
- Canton: Baume-les-Dames

Government
  - Mayor (2020–2026): Gilbert Labe
- Area^{1}: 4.16 km^{2} (1.61 sq mi)
- Highest elevation: 445 m (1,460 ft)
- Lowest elevation: 309 m (1,014 ft)
- Population (2023): 74
  - Density: 18/km^{2} (46/sq mi)
- Time zone: UTC+01:00 (CET)
  - Summer (DST): UTC+02:00 (CEST)
- INSEE/Postal code: 25092 /25640
- ^{1} French Land Register data, which excludes lakes, ponds, glaciers > 1 km^{2} (0.386 sq mi or 247 acres) and river estuaries.

La Bretenière (French pronunciation: [la bʁətnjɛʁ]) is a commune in the Doubs department in the Bourgogne-Franche-Comté region in eastern France.

== Population ==
Historical population
Year	Pop.	±% p.a.
1968	50	—
1975	47	−0.88%
1982	59	+3.30%
1990	56	−0.65%
1999	61	+0.95%
2007	65	+0.80%
2012	60	−1.59%
2017	71	+3.42%
2023	74	+0.69%
Source: INSEE

== See also ==
- Communes of the Doubs department
