= Fontenelle-Montby =

- Commune
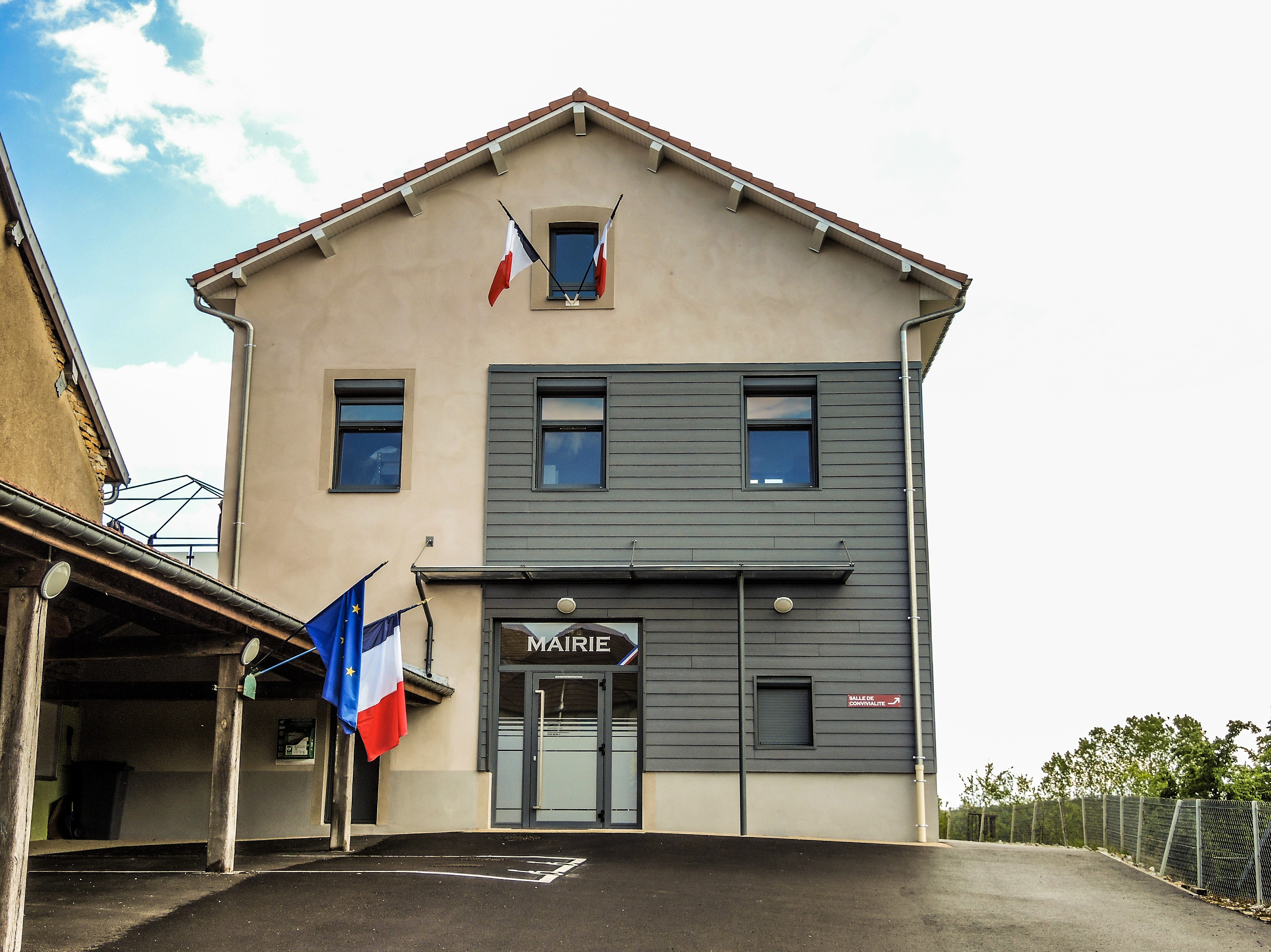
- The town hall in Fontenelle-Montby
- Location of Fontenelle-Montby
- Location within France Location within Bourgogne-Franche-Comté
- Coordinates: 47°27′01″N 6°24′54″E
- Country: France
- Region: Bourgogne-Franche-Comté
- Department: Doubs
- Arrondissement: Besançon
- Canton: Baume-les-Dames
- Intercommunality: Deux Vallées Vertes

Government
  - Mayor (2022–2026): Pierre Rupp
- Area^{1}: 6.65 km^{2} (2.57 sq mi)
- Highest elevation: 470 m (1,540 ft)
- Lowest elevation: 394 m (1,293 ft)
- Population (2023): 84
  - Density: 13/km^{2} (33/sq mi)
- Time zone: UTC+01:00 (CET)
  - Summer (DST): UTC+02:00 (CEST)
- INSEE/Postal code: 25247 /25340
- ^{1} French Land Register data, which excludes lakes, ponds, glaciers > 1 km^{2} (0.386 sq mi or 247 acres) and river estuaries.

Fontenelle-Montby is a commune in the Doubs department in the Bourgogne-Franche-Comté region in eastern France.

== Population ==
Historical population
Year	Pop.	±% p.a.
1968	134	—
1975	118	−1.80%
1982	104	−1.79%
1990	106	+0.24%
1999	90	−1.80%
2007	108	+2.31%
2012	105	−0.56%
2017	92	−2.61%
2023	84	−1.50%
Source: INSEE

== See also ==
- Communes of the Doubs department
