= Montivernage =

- Commune
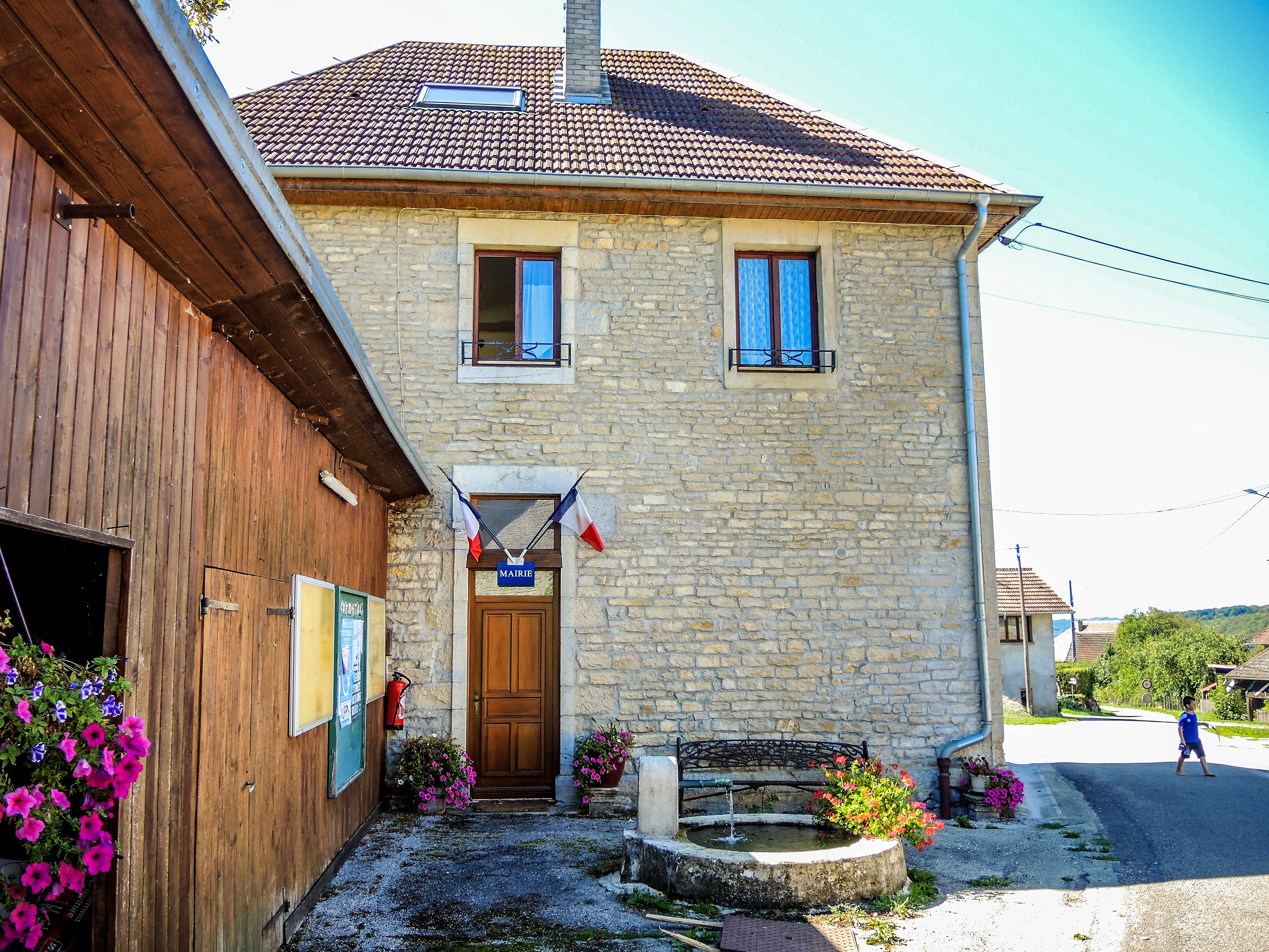
- The town hall in Montivernage
- Location of Montivernage
- Location within France Location within Bourgogne-Franche-Comté
- Coordinates: 47°19′06″N 6°25′41″E
- Country: France
- Region: Bourgogne-Franche-Comté
- Department: Doubs
- Arrondissement: Besançon
- Canton: Baume-les-Dames

Government
  - Mayor (2020–2026): Gérard Pahin-Mourot
- Area^{1}: 3.34 km^{2} (1.29 sq mi)
- Highest elevation: 541 m (1,775 ft)
- Lowest elevation: 390 m (1,280 ft)
- Population (2023): 27
  - Density: 8.1/km^{2} (21/sq mi)
- Time zone: UTC+01:00 (CET)
  - Summer (DST): UTC+02:00 (CEST)
- INSEE/Postal code: 25401 /25110
- ^{1} French Land Register data, which excludes lakes, ponds, glaciers > 1 km^{2} (0.386 sq mi or 247 acres) and river estuaries.

Montivernage (French pronunciation: [mɔ̃tivɛʁnaʒ]) is a commune in the Doubs department in the Bourgogne-Franche-Comté region in eastern France.

== Geography ==
Montivernage lies 13 km (8.1 mi) east of Baume-les-Dames.

== Population ==
Historical population
Year	Pop.	±% p.a.
1968	56	—
1975	55	−0.26%
1982	48	−1.93%
1990	38	−2.88%
1999	40	+0.57%
2007	32	−2.75%
2012	27	−3.34%
2017	28	+0.73%
2023	27	−0.60%
Source: INSEE

== See also ==
- Communes of the Doubs department
