= Châtillon-Guyotte =

- Commune
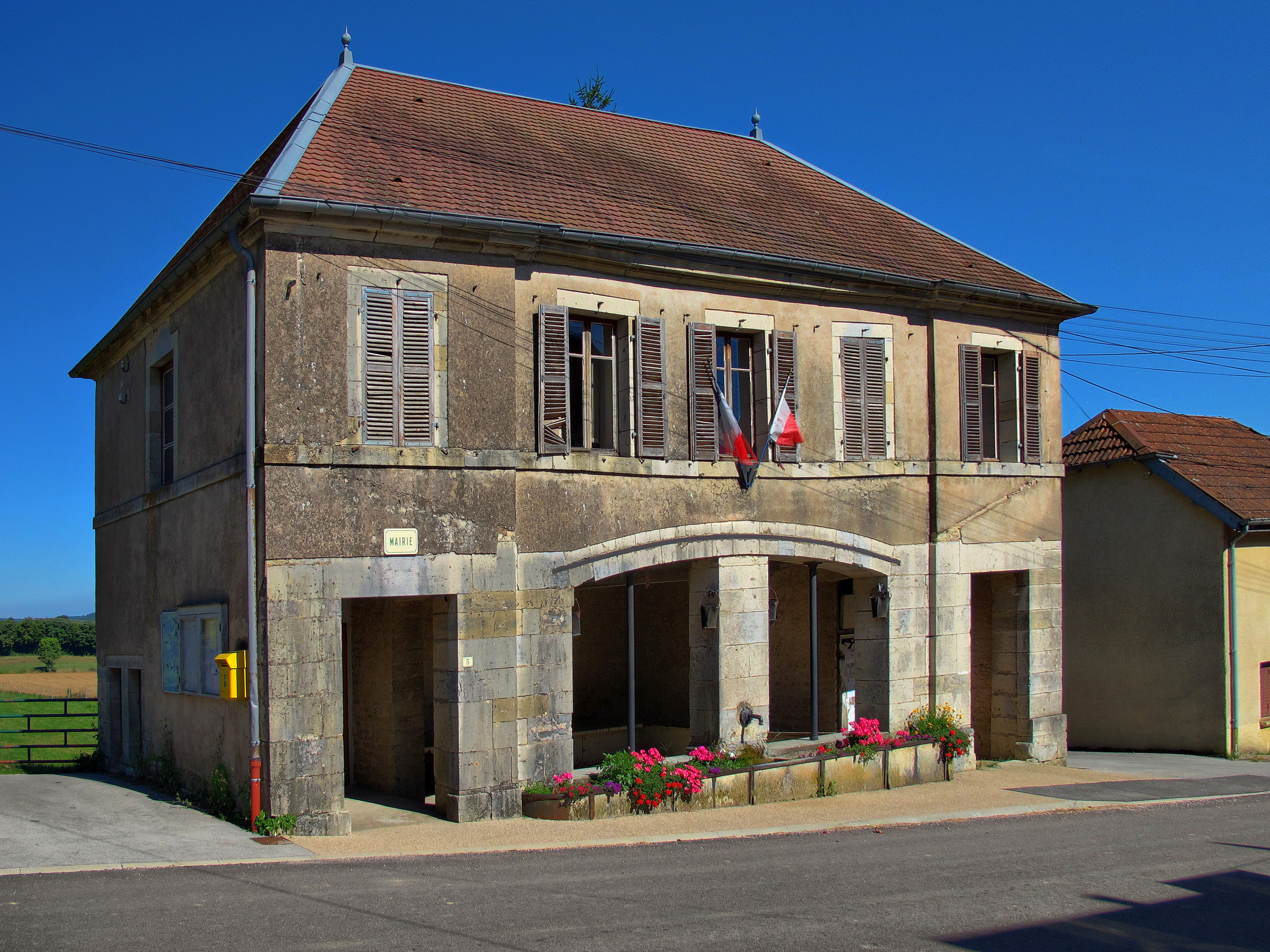
- The town hall in Châtillon-Guyotte
- Location of Châtillon-Guyotte
- Location within France Location within Bourgogne-Franche-Comté
- Coordinates: 47°19′54″N 6°10′10″E
- Country: France
- Region: Bourgogne-Franche-Comté
- Department: Doubs
- Arrondissement: Besançon
- Canton: Baume-les-Dames

Government
  - Mayor (2020–2026): Charlotte Converset
- Area^{1}: 4.44 km^{2} (1.71 sq mi)
- Highest elevation: 460 m (1,510 ft)
- Lowest elevation: 257 m (843 ft)
- Population (2023): 141
  - Density: 31.8/km^{2} (82.2/sq mi)
- Time zone: UTC+01:00 (CET)
  - Summer (DST): UTC+02:00 (CEST)
- INSEE/Postal code: 25132 /25640
- ^{1} French Land Register data, which excludes lakes, ponds, glaciers > 1 km^{2} (0.386 sq mi or 247 acres) and river estuaries.

Châtillon-Guyotte (French pronunciation: [ʃatijɔ̃ ɡɥijɔt]) is a commune in the Doubs department in the Bourgogne-Franche-Comté region in eastern France.

== Population ==
Historical population
Year	Pop.	±% p.a.
1968	65	—
1975	61	−0.90%
1982	87	+5.20%
1990	96	+1.24%
1999	110	+1.52%
2007	145	+3.51%
2012	129	−2.31%
2017	129	+0.00%
2023	141	+1.49%
Source: INSEE

== See also ==
- Communes of the Doubs department
