= Arrondissement of Besançon =

Coordinates: 47.25°N 6.03°E

Besançon
- Arrondissement
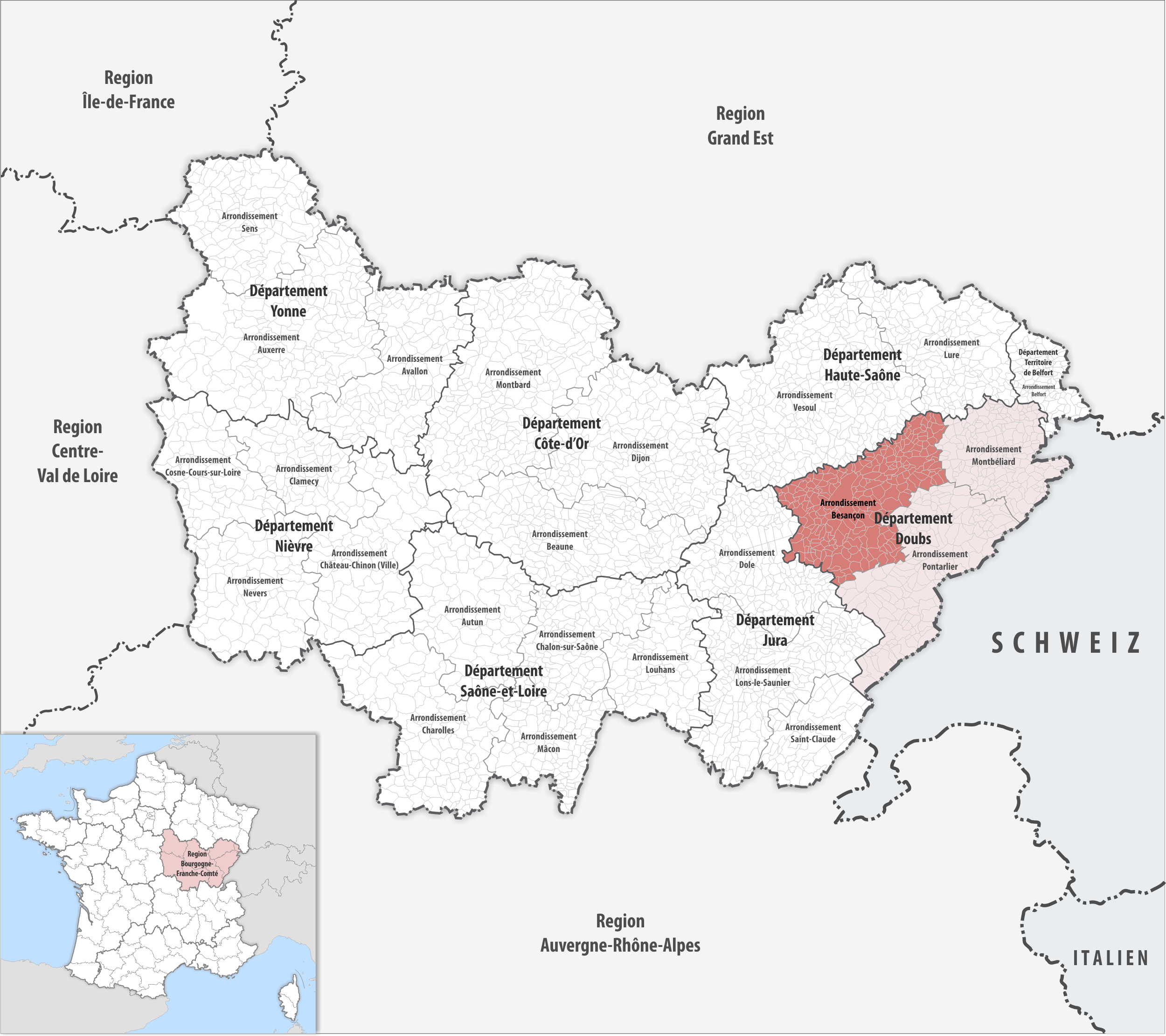
- Location within the region Bourgogne-Franche-Comté
- Country: France
- Region: Bourgogne-Franche-Comté
- Department: Doubs
- No. of communes: {{{nbcomm}}}
- Area: 1,926.4 km^{2} (743.8 sq mi)
- Population (2023): 253,337
  - Density: 131.51/km^{2} (340.60/sq mi)
- INSEE code: 251

The arrondissement of Besançon is an arrondissement of France in the Doubs department in the Bourgogne-Franche-Comté region. It has 252 communes. Its population is 253,510 (2021), and its area is 1,926.4 km^{2} (743.8 sq mi).

== Composition ==
The communes of the arrondissement of Besançon, and their INSEE codes, are:

1. Abbans-Dessous (25001)
2. Abbans-Dessus (25002)
3. Abbenans (25003)
4. Adam-lès-Passavant (25006)
5. Aïssey (25009)
6. Amagney (25014)
7. Amancey (25015)
8. Amathay-Vésigneux (25016)
9. Amondans (25017)
10. Arc-et-Senans (25021)
11. Audeux (25030)
12. Autechaux (25032)
13. Les Auxons (25035)
14. Avanne-Aveney (25036)
15. Avilley (25038)
16. Bartherans (25044)
17. Battenans-les-Mines (25045)
18. Baume-les-Dames (25047)
19. Berthelange (25055)
20. Besançon (25056)
21. Beure (25058)
22. Blarians (25065)
23. Bolandoz (25070)
24. Bonnal (25072)
25. Bonnay (25073)
26. Bouclans (25078)
27. Boussières (25084)
28. Braillans (25086)
29. Breconchaux (25088)
30. Brères (25090)
31. La Bretenière (25092)
32. Bretigney-Notre-Dame (25094)
33. Buffard (25098)
34. Burgille (25101)
35. Busy (25103)
36. By (25104)
37. Byans-sur-Doubs (25105)
38. Cademène (25106)
39. Cendrey (25107)
40. Cessey (25109)
41. Chalèze (25111)
42. Chalezeule (25112)
43. Champagney (25115)
44. Champlive (25116)
45. Champoux (25117)
46. Champvans-les-Moulins (25119)
47. Chantrans (25120)
48. Charnay (25126)
49. Chassagne-Saint-Denis (25129)
50. Châteauvieux-les-Fossés (25130)
51. Châtillon-Guyotte (25132)
52. Châtillon-le-Duc (25133)
53. Chaucenne (25136)
54. Chay (25143)
55. Chemaudin et Vaux (25147)
56. Chenecey-Buillon (25149)
57. Chevigney-sur-l'Ognon (25150)
58. La Chevillotte (25152)
59. Chevroz (25153)
60. Chouzelot (25154)
61. Cléron (25155)
62. Corcelle-Mieslot (25163)
63. Corcelles-Ferrières (25162)
64. Corcondray (25164)
65. Côtebrune (25166)
66. Courcelles (25171)
67. Courchapon (25172)
68. Crouzet-Migette (25180)
69. Cubrial (25181)
70. Cubry (25182)
71. Cusance (25183)
72. Cuse-et-Adrisans (25184)
73. Cussey-sur-Lison (25185)
74. Cussey-sur-l'Ognon (25186)
75. Dammartin-les-Templiers (25189)
76. Dannemarie-sur-Crète (25195)
77. Deluz (25197)
78. Déservillers (25199)
79. Devecey (25200)
80. Durnes (25208)
81. Échay (25209)
82. Échevannes (25211)
83. École-Valentin (25212)
84. L'Écouvotte (25215)
85. Émagny (25217)
86. Épeugney (25220)
87. Esnans (25221)
88. Éternoz-Vallée-du-Lison (25223)
89. Étrabonne (25225)
90. Ferrières-les-Bois (25235)
91. Fertans (25236)
92. Flagey (25241)
93. Flagey-Rigney (25242)
94. Fontain (25245)
95. Fontenelle-Montby (25247)
96. Fontenotte (25249)
97. Fourbanne (25251)
98. Fourg (25253)
99. Franey (25257)
100. Franois (25258)
101. Geneuille (25265)
102. Gennes (25267)
103. Germondans (25269)
104. Gevresin (25270)
105. Glamondans (25273)
106. Gondenans-les-Moulins (25277)
107. Gondenans-Montby (25276)
108. Gonsans (25278)
109. Gouhelans (25279)
110. Goux-sous-Landet (25283)
111. Grandfontaine (25287)
112. Grosbois (25298)
113. Guillon-les-Bains (25299)
114. Guyans-Durnes (25300)
115. L'Hôpital-du-Grosbois (25305)
116. Huanne-Montmartin (25310)
117. Hyèvre-Magny (25312)
118. Hyèvre-Paroisse (25313)
119. Jallerange (25317)
120. Laissey (25323)
121. Lanans (25324)
122. Lantenne-Vertière (25326)
123. Larnod (25328)
124. Lavans-Quingey (25330)
125. Lavans-Vuillafans (25331)
126. Lavernay (25332)
127. Liesle (25336)
128. Lizine (25338)
129. Lods (25339)
130. Lombard (25340)
131. Lomont-sur-Crête (25341)
132. Longeville (25346)
133. Luxiol (25354)
134. Malans (25359)
135. Malbrans (25360)
136. Mamirolle (25364)
137. Marchaux-Chaudefontaine (25368)
138. Mazerolles-le-Salin (25371)
139. Mercey-le-Grand (25374)
140. Mérey-Vieilley (25376)
141. Mésandans (25377)
142. Mesmay (25379)
143. Miserey-Salines (25381)
144. Moncey (25382)
145. Moncley (25383)
146. Mondon (25384)
147. Montagney-Servigney (25385)
148. Montfaucon (25395)
149. Montferrand-le-Château (25397)
150. Montgesoye (25400)
151. Montivernage (25401)
152. Montmahoux (25404)
153. Montrond-le-Château (25406)
154. Les Monts-Ronds (25375)
155. Montussaint (25408)
156. Morre (25410)
157. Le Moutherot (25414)
158. Mouthier-Haute-Pierre (25415)
159. Myon (25416)
160. Naisey-les-Granges (25417)
161. Nancray (25418)
162. Nans (25419)
163. Nans-sous-Sainte-Anne (25420)
164. Noironte (25427)
165. Novillars (25429)
166. Ollans (25430)
167. Ornans (25434)
168. Osse (25437)
169. Osselle-Routelle (25438)
170. Ougney-Douvot (25439)
171. Palantine (25443)
172. Palise (25444)
173. Paroy (25445)
174. Passavant (25446)
175. Pelousey (25448)
176. Pessans (25450)
177. Pirey (25454)
178. Placey (25455)
179. Pont-les-Moulins (25465)
180. Pouilley-Français (25466)
181. Pouilley-les-Vignes (25467)
182. Pouligney-Lusans (25468)
183. Puessans (25472)
184. Pugey (25473)
185. Le Puy (25474)
186. Quingey (25475)
187. Rancenay (25477)
188. Recologne (25482)
189. Rennes-sur-Loue (25488)
190. Reugney (25489)
191. Rigney (25490)
192. Rignosot (25491)
193. Rillans (25492)
194. Roche-lez-Beaupré (25495)
195. Rognon (25498)
196. Romain (25499)
197. Ronchaux (25500)
198. Roset-Fluans (25502)
199. Rougemont (25505)
200. Rougemontot (25506)
201. Rouhe (25507)
202. Roulans (25508)
203. Ruffey-le-Château (25510)
204. Rurey (25511)
205. Sainte-Anne (25513)
206. Saint-Hilaire (25518)
207. Saint-Juan (25520)
208. Saint-Vit (25527)
209. Samson (25528)
210. Saône (25532)
211. Saules (25535)
212. Sauvagney (25536)
213. Scey-Maisières (25537)
214. Séchin (25538)
215. Serre-les-Sapins (25542)
216. Servin (25544)
217. Silley-Amancey (25545)
218. Silley-Bléfond (25546)
219. Tallans (25556)
220. Tallenay (25557)
221. Tarcenay-Foucherans (25558)
222. Thise (25560)
223. Thoraise (25561)
224. Thurey-le-Mont (25563)
225. Torpes (25564)
226. La Tour-de-Sçay (25566)
227. Tournans (25567)
228. Trépot (25569)
229. Tressandans (25570)
230. Trouvans (25572)
231. Uzelle (25574)
232. Vaire (25575)
233. Le Val (25460)
234. Val-de-Roulans (25579)
235. Valleroy (25582)
236. Vaudrivillers (25590)
237. Velesmes-Essarts (25594)
238. Venise (25598)
239. Vennans (25599)
240. Vergranne (25602)
241. Verne (25604)
242. La Vèze (25611)
243. Vieilley (25612)
244. Viéthorey (25613)
245. Villars-Saint-Georges (25616)
246. Villers-Buzon (25622)
247. Villers-Grélot (25624)
248. Villers-Saint-Martin (25626)
249. Voillans (25629)
250. Voires (25630)
251. Vorges-les-Pins (25631)
252. Vuillafans (25633)

== History ==
The arrondissement of Besançon was created in 1800. In 2009 the two cantons of Pierrefontaine-les-Varans and Vercel-Villedieu-le-Camp that previously belonged to the arrondissement of Besançon were added to the arrondissement of Pontarlier.

As a result of the reorganisation of the cantons of France which came into effect in 2015, the borders of the cantons are no longer related to the borders of the arrondissements. The cantons of the arrondissement of Besançon were, as of January 2015:

1. Amancey
2. Audeux
3. Baume-les-Dames
4. Besançon-Est
5. Besançon-Nord-Est
6. Besançon-Nord-Ouest
7. Besançon-Ouest
8. Besançon-Planoise
9. Besançon-Sud
10. Boussières
11. Marchaux
12. Ornans
13. Quingey
14. Rougemont
15. Roulans
