= Esnans =

- Commune
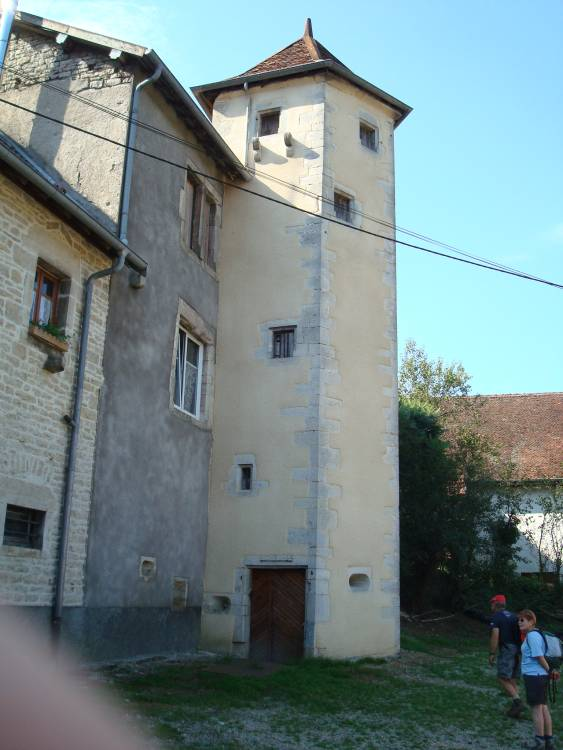
- Chateau-farm
- Location of Esnans
- Location within France Location within Bourgogne-Franche-Comté
- Coordinates: 47°20′23″N 6°19′31″E
- Country: France
- Region: Bourgogne-Franche-Comté
- Department: Doubs
- Arrondissement: Besançon
- Canton: Baume-les-Dames

Government
  - Mayor (2020–2026): Joëlle Maj
- Area^{1}: 3.72 km^{2} (1.44 sq mi)
- Elevation: 360 m (1,180 ft)
- Highest elevation: 588 m (1,929 ft)
- Lowest elevation: 259 m (850 ft)
- Population (2023): 65
  - Density: 17/km^{2} (45/sq mi)
- Time zone: UTC+01:00 (CET)
  - Summer (DST): UTC+02:00 (CEST)
- INSEE/Postal code: 25221 /25110
- ^{1} French Land Register data, which excludes lakes, ponds, glaciers > 1 km^{2} (0.386 sq mi or 247 acres) and river estuaries.

Esnans (French pronunciation: [enɑ̃]) is a commune in the Doubs department in the Bourgogne-Franche-Comté region in eastern France.

== Population ==
Historical population
Year	Pop.	±% p.a.
1968	31	—
1975	37	+2.56%
1982	40	+1.12%
1990	39	−0.32%
1999	43	+1.09%
2007	46	+0.85%
2012	37	−4.26%
2017	68	+12.94%
2023	65	−0.75%
Source: INSEE

== See also ==
- Communes of the Doubs department
