= Blarians =

- Commune
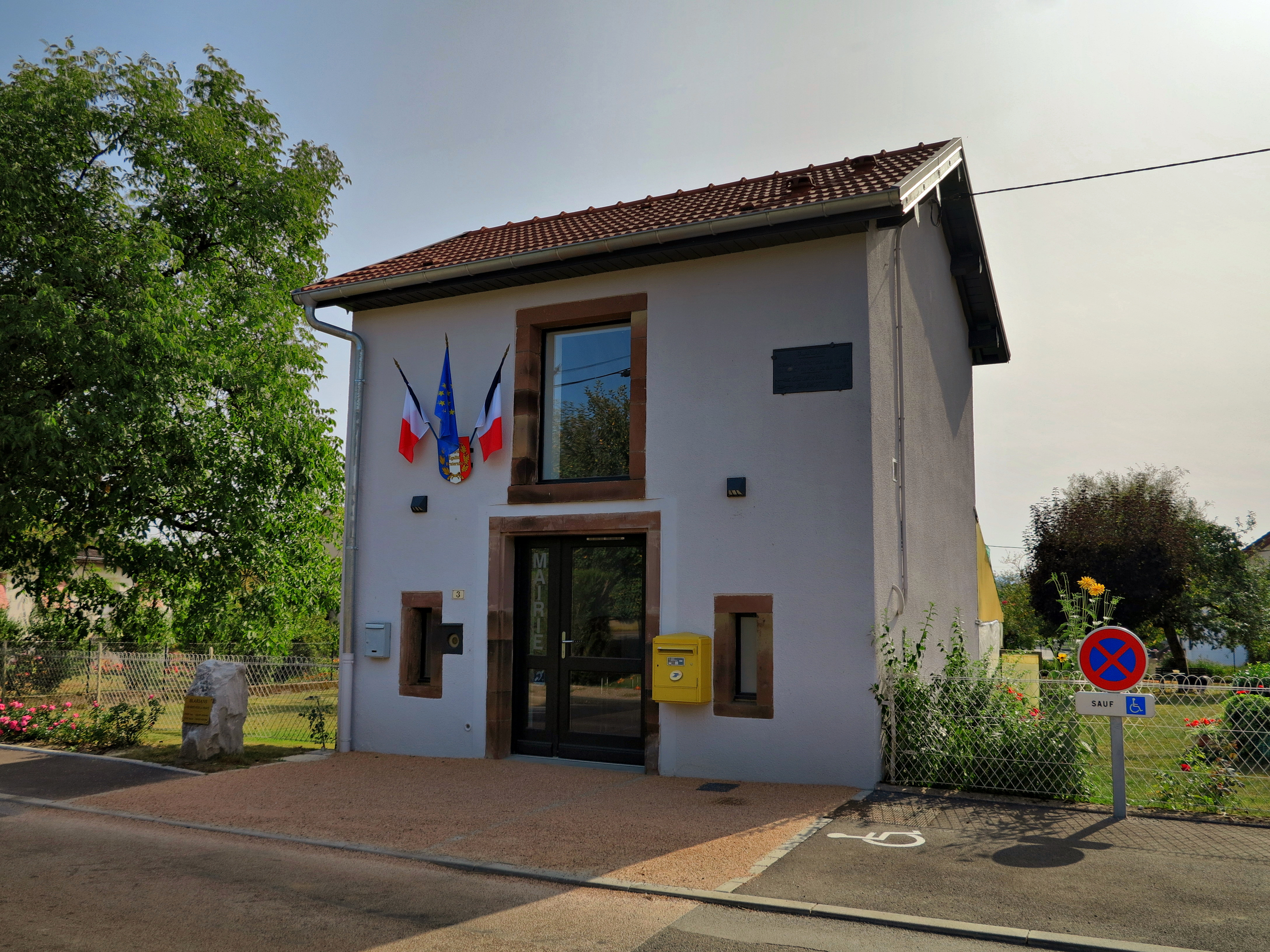
- The town hall in Blarians

- Coat of arms
- Location of Blarians
- Location within France Location within Bourgogne-Franche-Comté
- Coordinates: 47°24′44″N 6°10′50″E
- Country: France
- Region: Bourgogne-Franche-Comté
- Department: Doubs
- Arrondissement: Besançon
- Canton: Baume-les-Dames

Government
  - Mayor (2024–2026): Florent Casasola
- Area^{1}: 0.89 km^{2} (0.34 sq mi)
- Highest elevation: 267 m (876 ft)
- Lowest elevation: 227 m (745 ft)
- Population (2023): 56
  - Density: 63/km^{2} (160/sq mi)
- Time zone: UTC+01:00 (CET)
  - Summer (DST): UTC+02:00 (CEST)
- INSEE/Postal code: 25065 /25640
- ^{1} French Land Register data, which excludes lakes, ponds, glaciers > 1 km^{2} (0.386 sq mi or 247 acres) and river estuaries.

Blarians (French pronunciation: [blaʁjɑ̃]) is a commune in the Doubs department in the Bourgogne-Franche-Comté region in eastern France.

== Population ==
Historical population
Year	Pop.	±% p.a.
1968	35	—
1975	39	+1.56%
1982	57	+5.57%
1990	47	−2.38%
1999	42	−1.24%
2007	45	+0.87%
2012	58	+5.21%
2017	57	−0.35%
2023	56	−0.29%
Source: INSEE

== Geography ==
Blarians is a small commune: its municipal area covers 0.89 square kilometers, ranging between 227 and 267 meters elevation. It is bounded on the northern, western, and southern sides by the river Ognon. It lies 22 km (14 mi) northeast of Besançon.

== See also ==
- Communes of the Doubs department
