= Gondenans-Montby =

- Commune
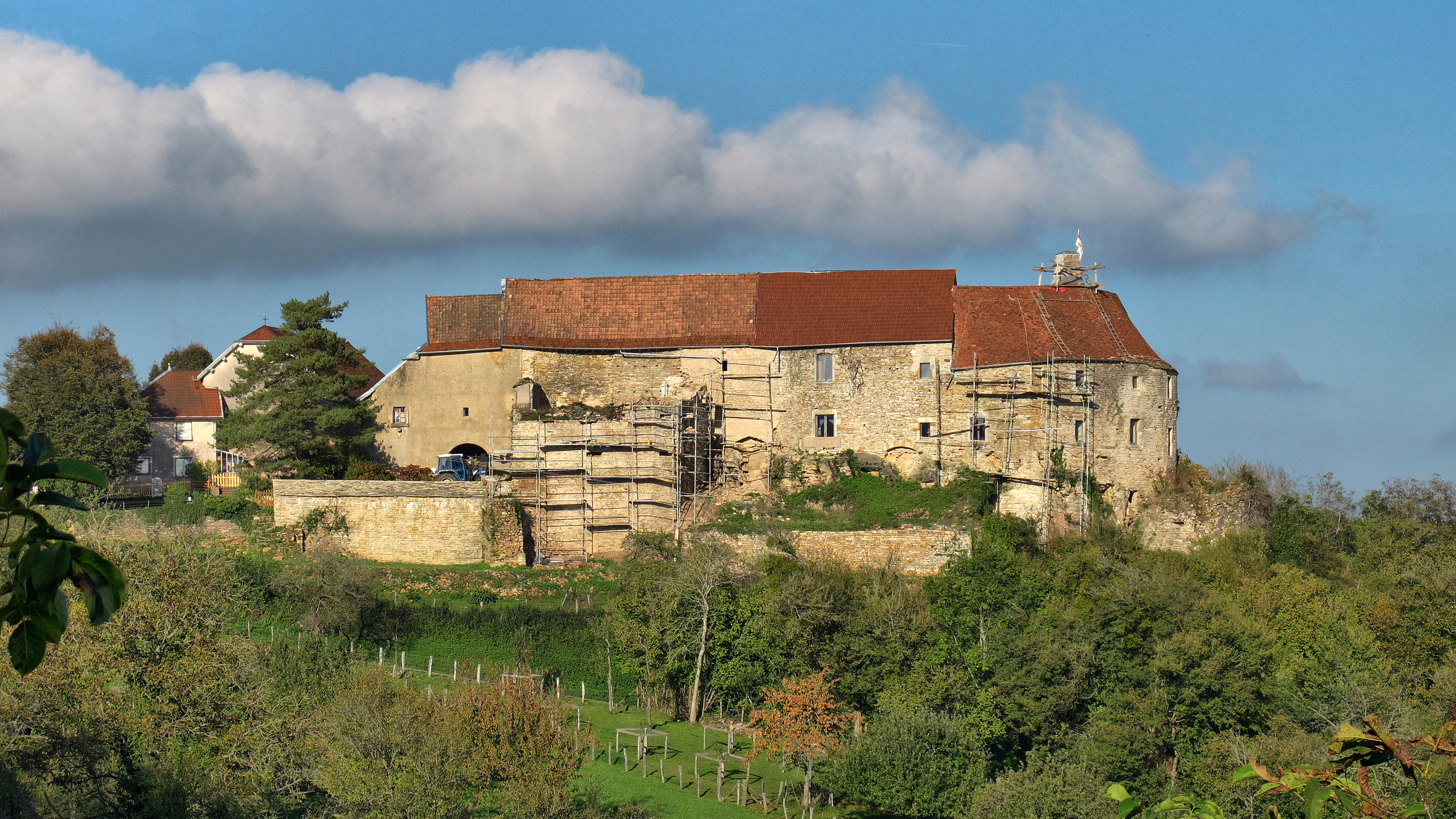
- The chateau in Montby
- Location of Gondenans-Montby
- Location within France Location within Bourgogne-Franche-Comté
- Coordinates: 47°26′01″N 6°27′12″E
- Country: France
- Region: Bourgogne-Franche-Comté
- Department: Doubs
- Arrondissement: Besançon
- Canton: Baume-les-Dames

Government
  - Mayor (2020–2026): Alain Girardot
- Area^{1}: 11.78 km^{2} (4.55 sq mi)
- Highest elevation: 494 m (1,621 ft)
- Lowest elevation: 318 m (1,043 ft)
- Population (2023): 161
  - Density: 13.7/km^{2} (35.4/sq mi)
- Time zone: UTC+01:00 (CET)
  - Summer (DST): UTC+02:00 (CEST)
- INSEE/Postal code: 25276 /25340
- ^{1} French Land Register data, which excludes lakes, ponds, glaciers > 1 km^{2} (0.386 sq mi or 247 acres) and river estuaries.

Gondenans-Montby (French pronunciation: [ɡɔ̃dnɑ̃ mɔ̃bi]) is a commune in the Doubs department in the Bourgogne-Franche-Comté region in eastern France.

== Population ==
Historical population
Year	Pop.	±% p.a.
1968	177	—
1975	169	−0.66%
1982	198	+2.29%
1990	195	−0.19%
1999	175	−1.20%
2007	169	−0.44%
2012	172	+0.35%
2017	175	+0.35%
2023	161	−1.38%
Source: INSEE

== See also ==
- Communes of the Doubs department
