= Lomont-sur-Crête =

- Commune
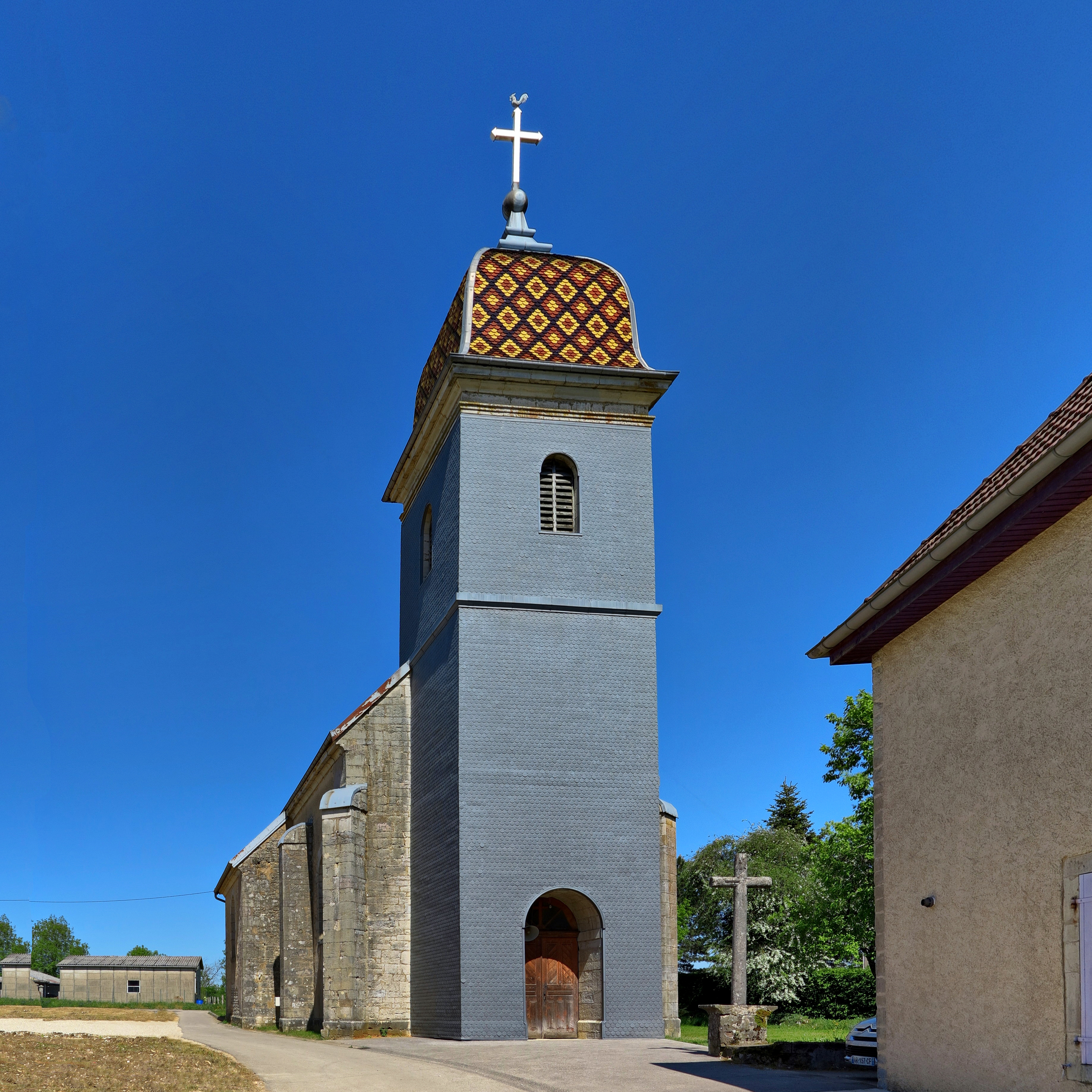
- The church in Lomont-sur-Crête
- Location of Lomont-sur-Crête
- Location within France Location within Bourgogne-Franche-Comté
- Coordinates: 47°20′21″N 6°25′57″E
- Country: France
- Region: Bourgogne-Franche-Comté
- Department: Doubs
- Arrondissement: Besançon
- Canton: Baume-les-Dames

Government
  - Mayor (2020–2026): Claude Devillers
- Area^{1}: 9.79 km^{2} (3.78 sq mi)
- Highest elevation: 562 m (1,844 ft)
- Lowest elevation: 380 m (1,250 ft)
- Population (2023): 170
  - Density: 17/km^{2} (45/sq mi)
- Time zone: UTC+01:00 (CET)
  - Summer (DST): UTC+02:00 (CEST)
- INSEE/Postal code: 25341 /25110
- ^{1} French Land Register data, which excludes lakes, ponds, glaciers > 1 km^{2} (0.386 sq mi or 247 acres) and river estuaries.

Lomont-sur-Crête (French pronunciation: [lɔmɔ̃ syʁ kʁɛt], literally Lomont on Ridge) is a commune in the Doubs department in the Bourgogne-Franche-Comté region in eastern France.

== Population ==
Historical population
Year	Pop.	±% p.a.
1968	118	—
1975	120	+0.24%
1982	138	+2.02%
1990	155	+1.46%
1999	155	+0.00%
2007	158	+0.24%
2012	166	+0.99%
2017	171	+0.60%
2023	170	−0.10%
Source: INSEE

== Economy ==
A third of the village is involved in agriculture. It also has the only cheese factory in the canton that produces Comté, a hard cheese made from cow's milk that is similar to Gruyère.

== See also ==
- Communes of the Doubs department
