= Rurey =

- Commune
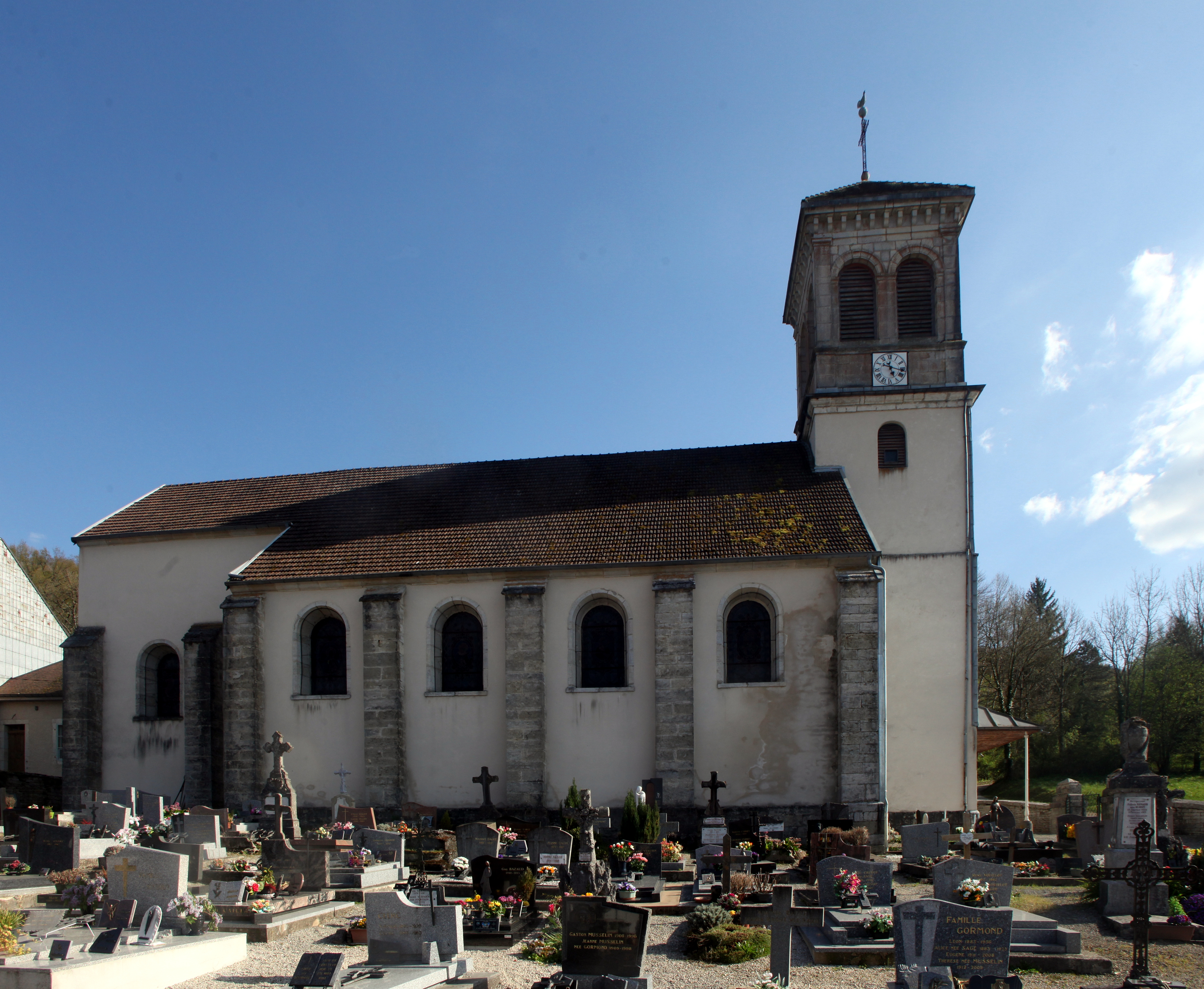
- The church in Rurey
- Location of Rurey
- Location within France Location within Bourgogne-Franche-Comté
- Coordinates: 47°05′50″N 6°00′35″E
- Country: France
- Region: Bourgogne-Franche-Comté
- Department: Doubs
- Arrondissement: Besançon
- Canton: Saint-Vit
- Intercommunality: Loue-Lison

Government
  - Mayor (2020–2026): Alain Monnier
- Area^{1}: 14.77 km^{2} (5.70 sq mi)
- Highest elevation: 520 m (1,710 ft)
- Lowest elevation: 285 m (935 ft)
- Population (2023): 354
  - Density: 24.0/km^{2} (62.1/sq mi)
- Time zone: UTC+01:00 (CET)
  - Summer (DST): UTC+02:00 (CEST)
- INSEE/Postal code: 25511 /25290
- ^{1} French Land Register data, which excludes lakes, ponds, glaciers > 1 km^{2} (0.386 sq mi or 247 acres) and river estuaries.

Rurey (French pronunciation: [ʁyʁɛ]) is a commune in the Doubs department in the Bourgogne-Franche-Comté region in eastern France.

== Geography ==
Rurey lies 14 km (8.7 mi) east of Quingey in the valley of the Loue between Ornans and Quingey.

== Population ==
Historical population
Year	Pop.	±% p.a.
1968	183	—
1975	154	−2.43%
1982	189	+2.97%
1990	227	+2.32%
1999	282	+2.44%
2007	316	+1.43%
2012	327	+0.69%
2017	340	+0.78%
2023	354	+0.67%
Source: INSEE

== See also ==
- Communes of the Doubs department
