= Cuse-et-Adrisans =

- Commune
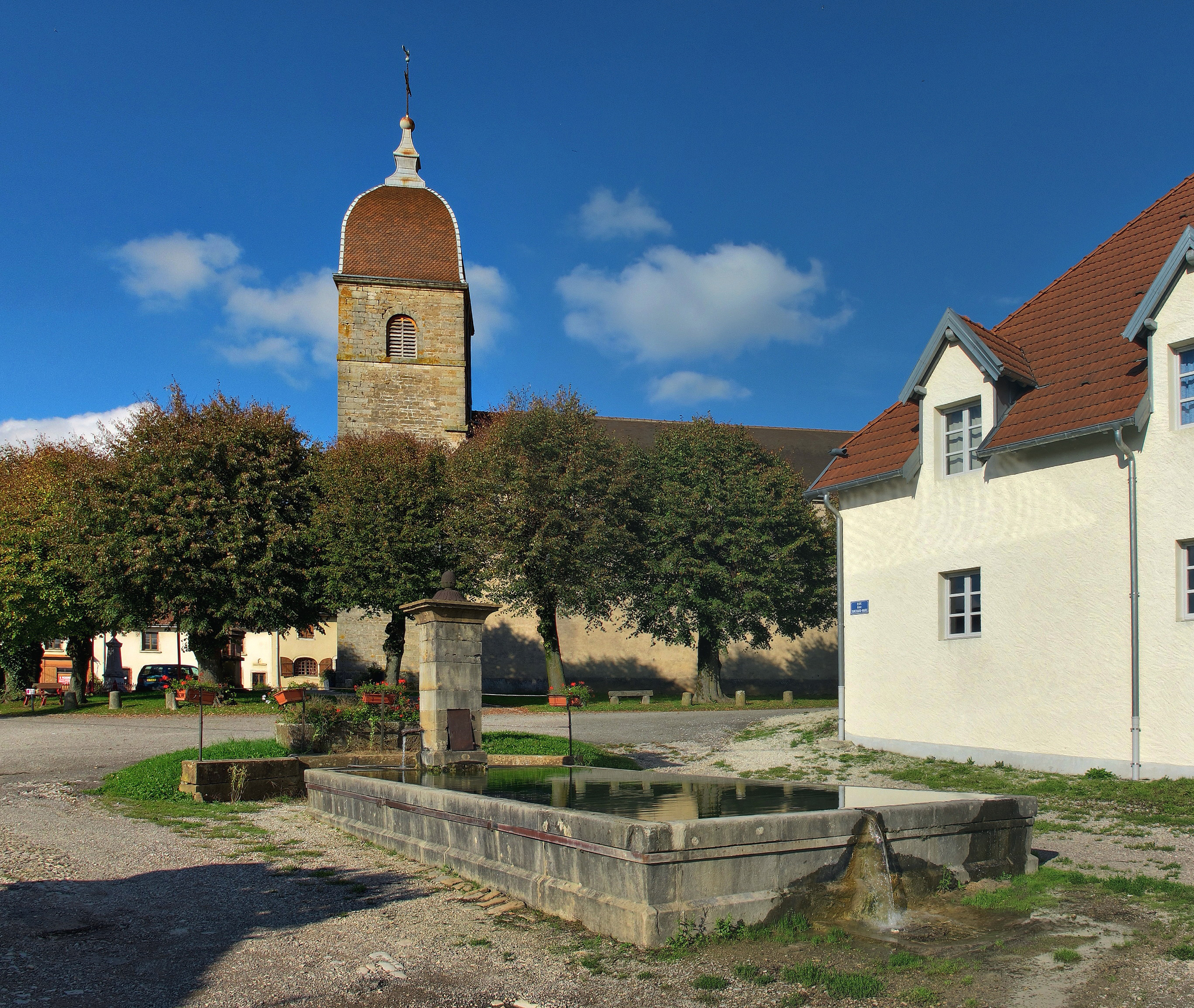
- The fountain and church in Cuse-et-Adrisans
- Location of Cuse-et-Adrisans
- Location within France Location within Bourgogne-Franche-Comté
- Coordinates: 47°28′49″N 6°23′29″E
- Country: France
- Region: Bourgogne-Franche-Comté
- Department: Doubs
- Arrondissement: Besançon
- Canton: Baume-les-Dames

Government
  - Mayor (2024–2026): Virginie Maurivard
- Area^{1}: 5.42 km^{2} (2.09 sq mi)
- Highest elevation: 425 m (1,394 ft)
- Lowest elevation: 259 m (850 ft)
- Population (2023): 274
  - Density: 50.6/km^{2} (131/sq mi)
- Time zone: UTC+01:00 (CET)
  - Summer (DST): UTC+02:00 (CEST)
- INSEE/Postal code: 25184 /25680
- ^{1} French Land Register data, which excludes lakes, ponds, glaciers > 1 km^{2} (0.386 sq mi or 247 acres) and river estuaries.

Cuse-et-Adrisans (French pronunciation: [kyz e adʁizɑ̃]) is a commune in the Doubs department in the Bourgogne-Franche-Comté region in eastern France.

== Population ==
Historical population
Year	Pop.	±% p.a.
1968	204	—
1975	182	−1.62%
1982	169	−1.05%
1990	175	+0.44%
1999	209	+1.99%
2007	248	+2.16%
2012	282	+2.60%
2017	284	+0.14%
2023	274	−0.60%
Source: INSEE

== See also ==
- Communes of the Doubs department
