= Osse, Doubs =

Osse
- Commune
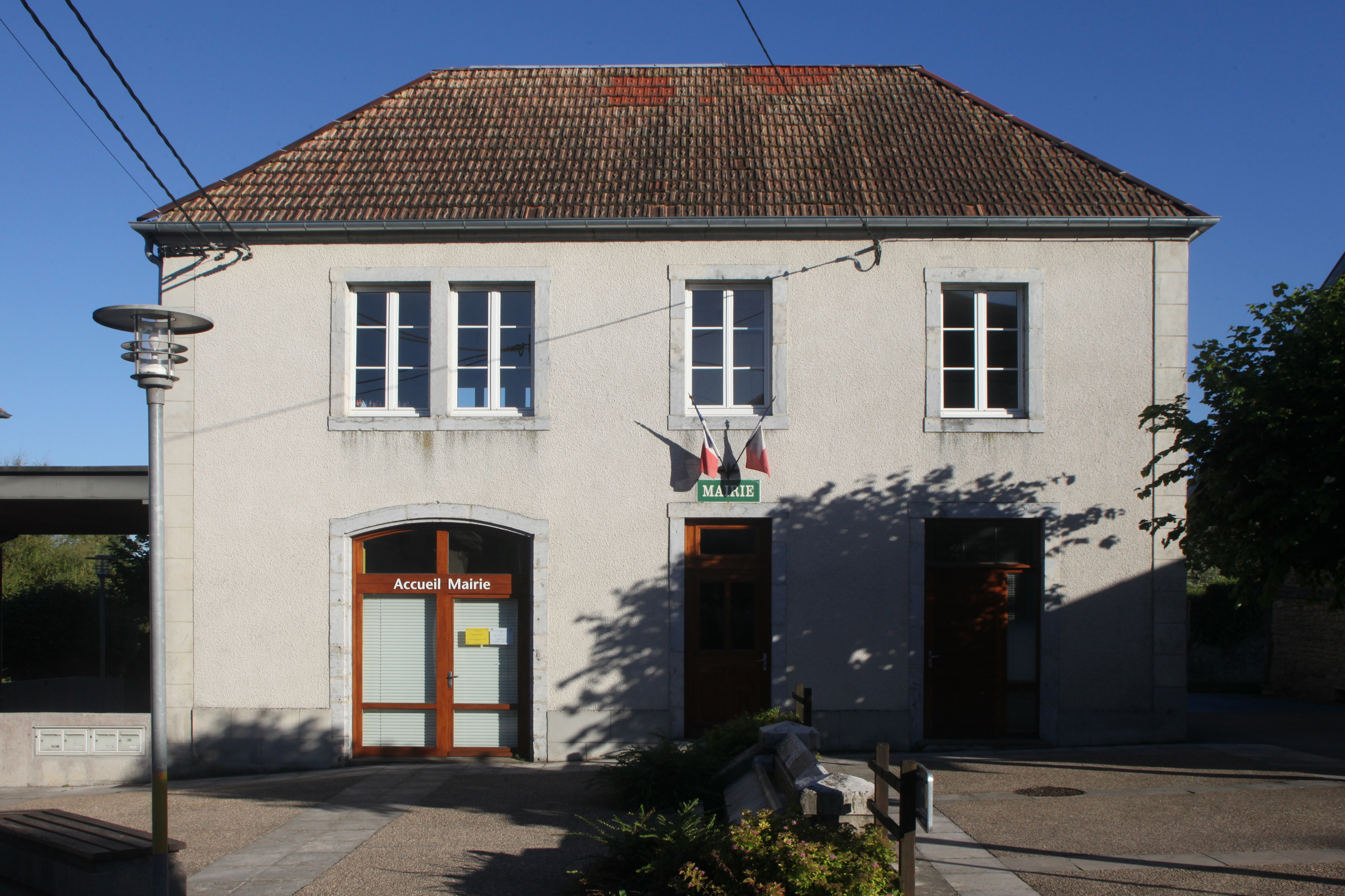
- The town hall in Osse

- Coat of arms
- Location of Osse
- Location within France Location within Bourgogne-Franche-Comté
- Coordinates: 47°16′04″N 6°12′49″E
- Country: France
- Region: Bourgogne-Franche-Comté
- Department: Doubs
- Arrondissement: Besançon
- Canton: Baume-les-Dames

Government
  - Mayor (2020–2026): Charles Piquard
- Area^{1}: 8.21 km^{2} (3.17 sq mi)
- Highest elevation: 565 m (1,854 ft)
- Lowest elevation: 392 m (1,286 ft)
- Population (2023): 372
  - Density: 45.3/km^{2} (117/sq mi)
- Time zone: UTC+01:00 (CET)
  - Summer (DST): UTC+02:00 (CEST)
- INSEE/Postal code: 25437 /25360
- ^{1} French Land Register data, which excludes lakes, ponds, glaciers > 1 km^{2} (0.386 sq mi or 247 acres) and river estuaries.

Osse (French pronunciation: [ɔs]) is a commune in the Doubs department in the Bourgogne-Franche-Comté region in eastern France.

== Population ==
Historical population
Year	Pop.	±% p.a.
1968	130	—
1975	162	+3.19%
1982	251	+6.45%
1990	267	+0.78%
1999	298	+1.23%
2007	317	+0.78%
2012	335	+1.11%
2017	323	−0.73%
2023	372	+2.38%
Source: INSEE

== See also ==
- Communes of the Doubs department
