= Dammartin-les-Templiers =

- Commune
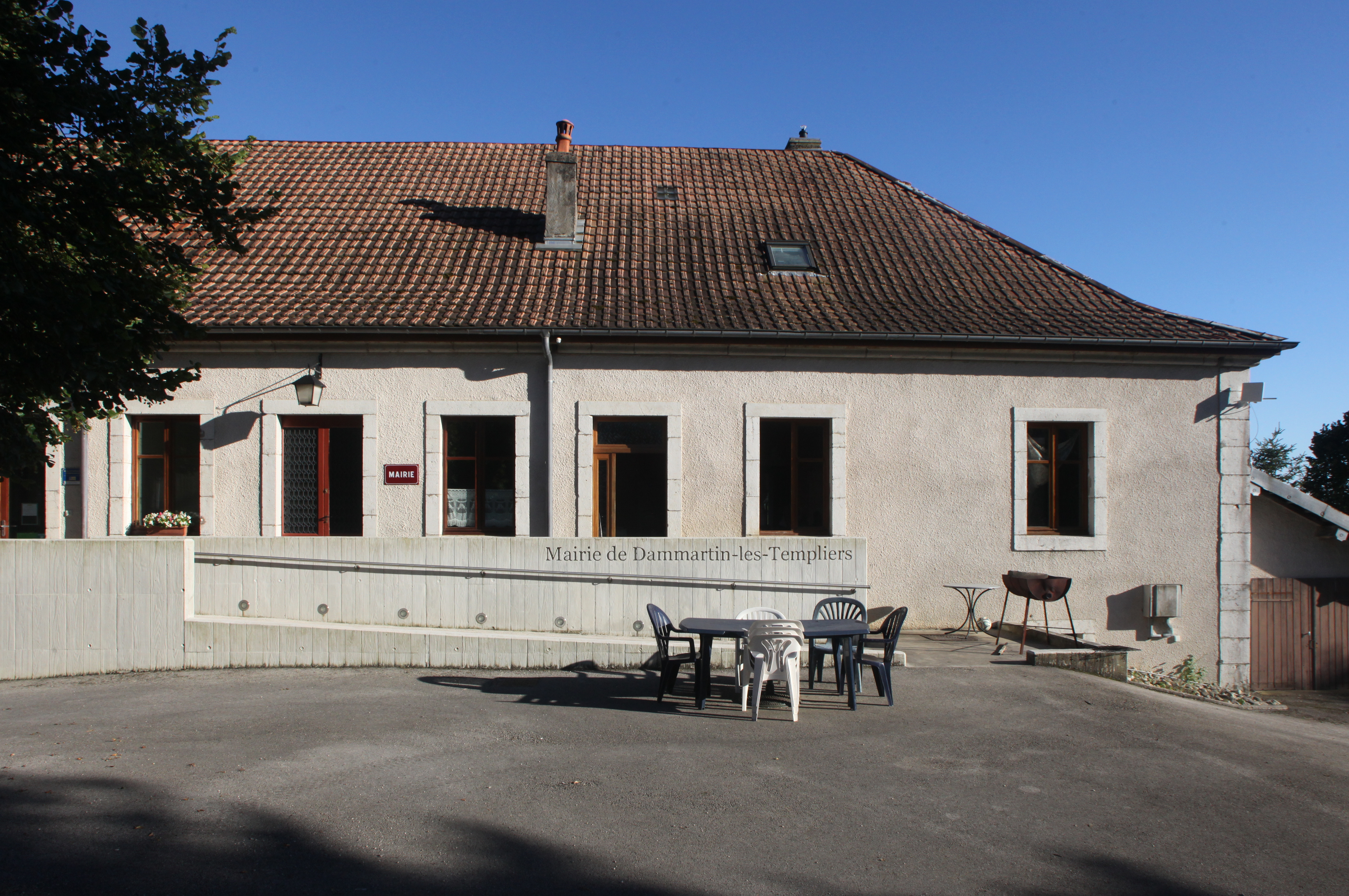
- The town hall in Dammartin-les-Templiers

- Coat of arms
- Location of Dammartin-les-Templiers
- Location within France Location within Bourgogne-Franche-Comté
- Coordinates: 47°17′29″N 6°16′04″E
- Country: France
- Region: Bourgogne-Franche-Comté
- Department: Doubs
- Arrondissement: Besançon
- Canton: Baume-les-Dames
- Intercommunality: Doubs Baumois

Government
  - Mayor (2020–2026): Martine Perrot
- Area^{1}: 9.91 km^{2} (3.83 sq mi)
- Highest elevation: 570 m (1,870 ft)
- Lowest elevation: 369 m (1,211 ft)
- Population (2023): 218
  - Density: 22.0/km^{2} (57.0/sq mi)
- Time zone: UTC+01:00 (CET)
  - Summer (DST): UTC+02:00 (CEST)
- INSEE/Postal code: 25189 /25110
- ^{1} French Land Register data, which excludes lakes, ponds, glaciers > 1 km^{2} (0.386 sq mi or 247 acres) and river estuaries.

Dammartin-les-Templiers (French pronunciation: [damaʁtɛ̃ le tɑ̃plije]) is a commune in the Doubs department in the Bourgogne-Franche-Comté region in eastern France.

== Population ==
Historical population
Year	Pop.	±% p.a.
1968	144	—
1975	120	−2.57%
1982	132	+1.37%
1990	174	+3.51%
1999	191	+1.04%
2007	194	+0.19%
2012	211	+1.69%
2017	197	−1.36%
2023	218	+1.70%
Source: INSEE

== See also ==
- Communes of the Doubs department
