= Montussaint =

- Commune
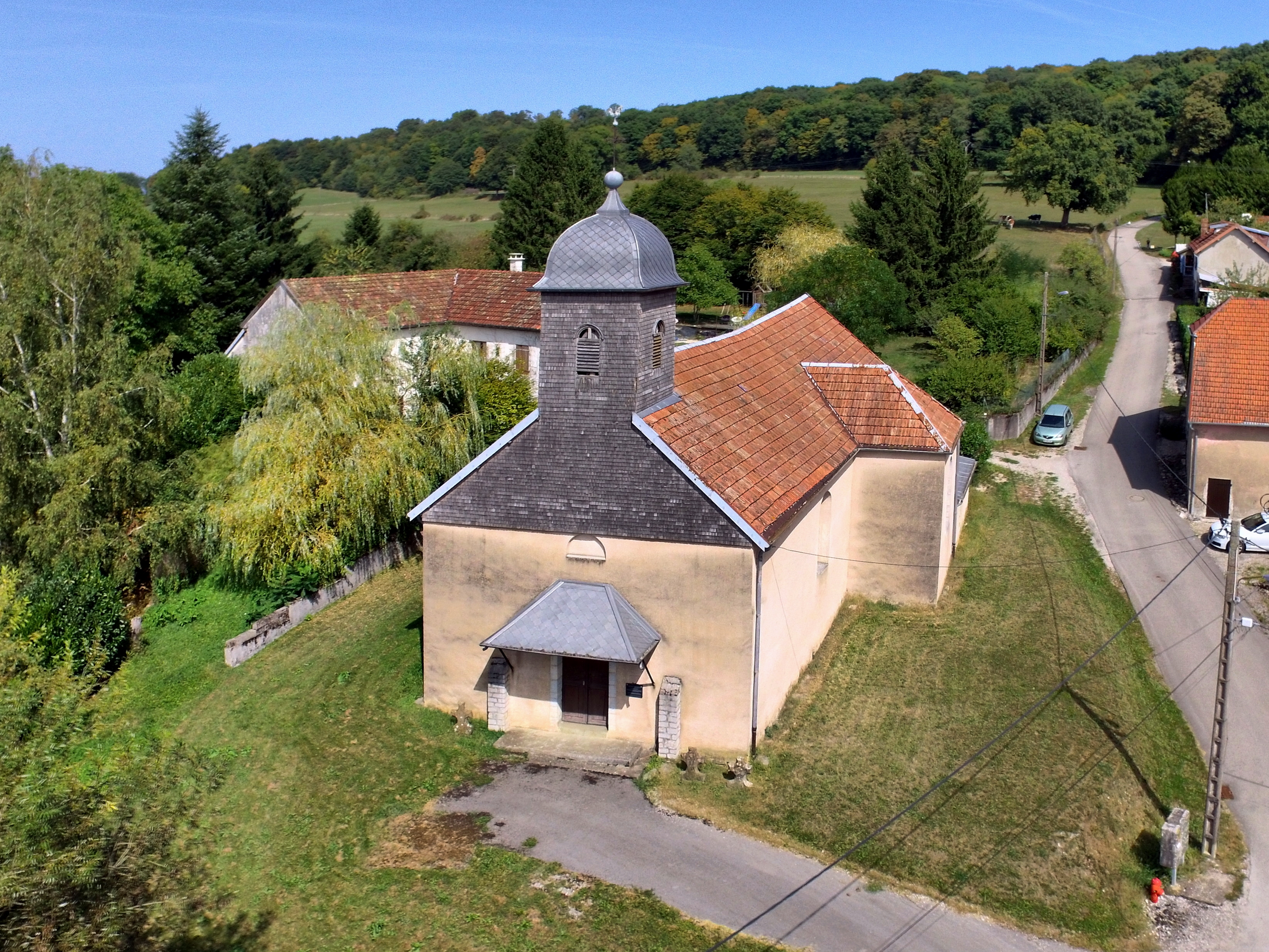
- The church in Montussaint
- Location of Montussaint
- Location within France Location within Bourgogne-Franche-Comté
- Coordinates: 47°26′03″N 6°17′35″E
- Country: France
- Region: Bourgogne-Franche-Comté
- Department: Doubs
- Arrondissement: Besançon
- Canton: Baume-les-Dames

Government
  - Mayor (2023–2026): Alexandre Chaillet
- Area^{1}: 3.04 km^{2} (1.17 sq mi)
- Highest elevation: 399 m (1,309 ft)
- Lowest elevation: 249 m (817 ft)
- Population (2023): 54
  - Density: 18/km^{2} (46/sq mi)
- Time zone: UTC+01:00 (CET)
  - Summer (DST): UTC+02:00 (CEST)
- INSEE/Postal code: 25408 /25680
- ^{1} French Land Register data, which excludes lakes, ponds, glaciers > 1 km^{2} (0.386 sq mi or 247 acres) and river estuaries.

Montussaint (French pronunciation: [mɔ̃tysɛ̃]) is a commune in the Doubs department in the Bourgogne-Franche-Comté region in eastern France.

== Geography ==
Montussaint lies 8 km (5.0 mi) from Rougemont on the boundary of the department of Haute-Saône in the valley of the Ognon. The Ognon forms the boundary between the two departments.

== Population ==
Historical population
Year	Pop.	±% p.a.
1968	92	—
1975	67	−4.43%
1982	65	−0.43%
1990	58	−1.41%
1999	55	−0.59%
2007	64	+1.91%
2012	68	+1.22%
2017	58	−3.13%
2023	54	−1.18%
Source: INSEE

== See also ==
- Communes of the Doubs department
