= La Tour-de-Sçay =

- Commune
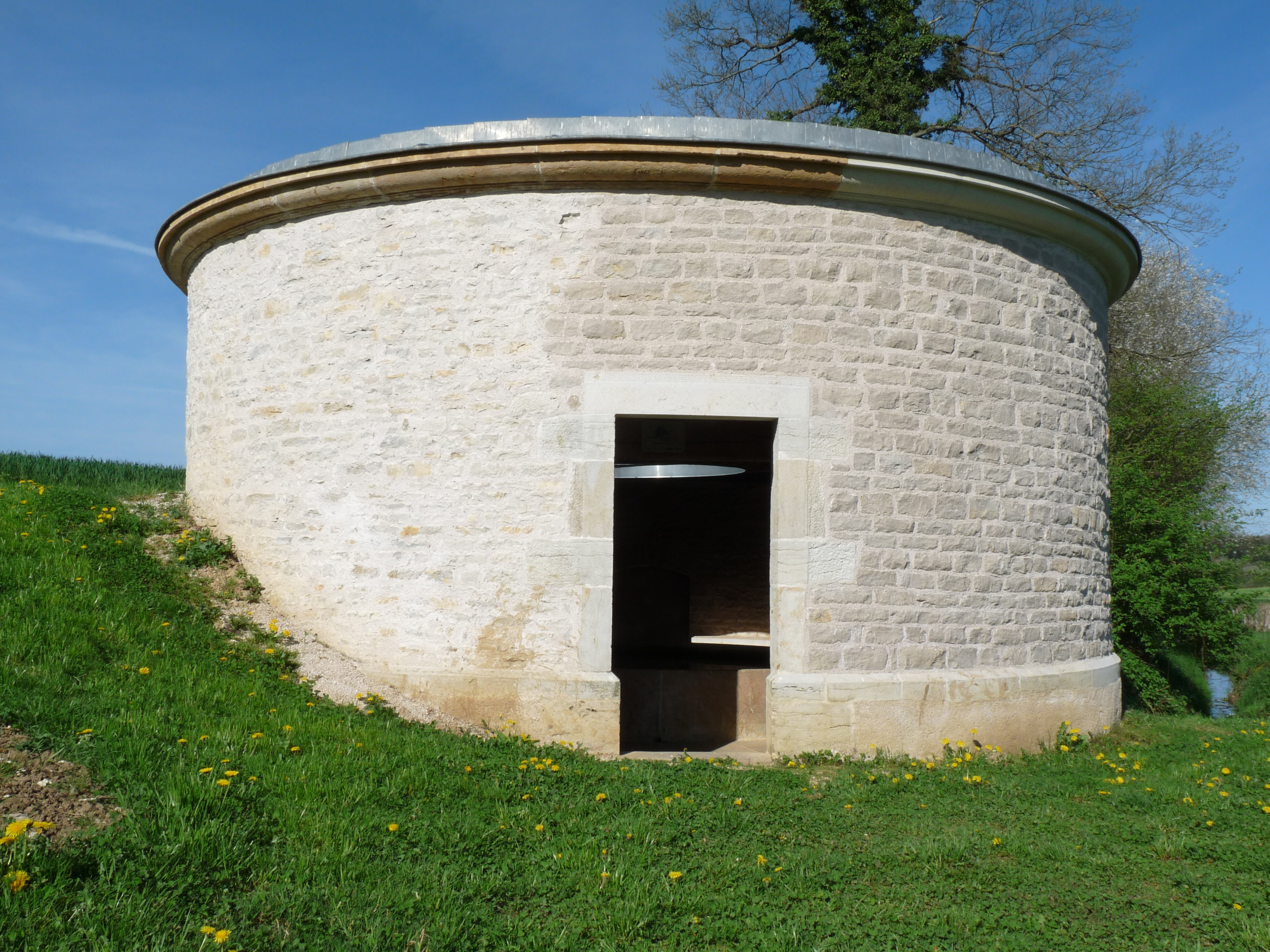
- The wash house in La Tour-de-Sçay
- Location of La Tour-de-Sçay
- Location within France Location within Bourgogne-Franche-Comté
- Coordinates: 47°23′14″N 6°13′37″E
- Country: France
- Region: Bourgogne-Franche-Comté
- Department: Doubs
- Arrondissement: Besançon
- Canton: Baume-les-Dames

Government
  - Mayor (2020–2026): Françoise Bride
- Area^{1}: 8.82 km^{2} (3.41 sq mi)
- Highest elevation: 495 m (1,624 ft)
- Lowest elevation: 253 m (830 ft)
- Population (2023): 315
  - Density: 35.7/km^{2} (92.5/sq mi)
- Time zone: UTC+01:00 (CET)
  - Summer (DST): UTC+02:00 (CEST)
- INSEE/Postal code: 25566 /25640
- ^{1} French Land Register data, which excludes lakes, ponds, glaciers > 1 km^{2} (0.386 sq mi or 247 acres) and river estuaries.

La Tour-de-Sçay (French pronunciation: [la tuʁ də sɛ]) is a commune in the Doubs department in the Bourgogne-Franche-Comté region in eastern France.

== Geography ==
The commune lies 16 km (9.9 mi) northeast of Marchaux.

== Population ==
Historical population
Year	Pop.	±% p.a.
1968	141	—
1975	199	+5.05%
1982	207	+0.56%
1990	219	+0.71%
1999	222	+0.15%
2007	244	+1.19%
2012	246	+0.16%
2017	297	+3.84%
2023	315	+0.99%
Source: INSEE

== See also ==
- Communes of the Doubs department
