= Sauvagney =

- Commune
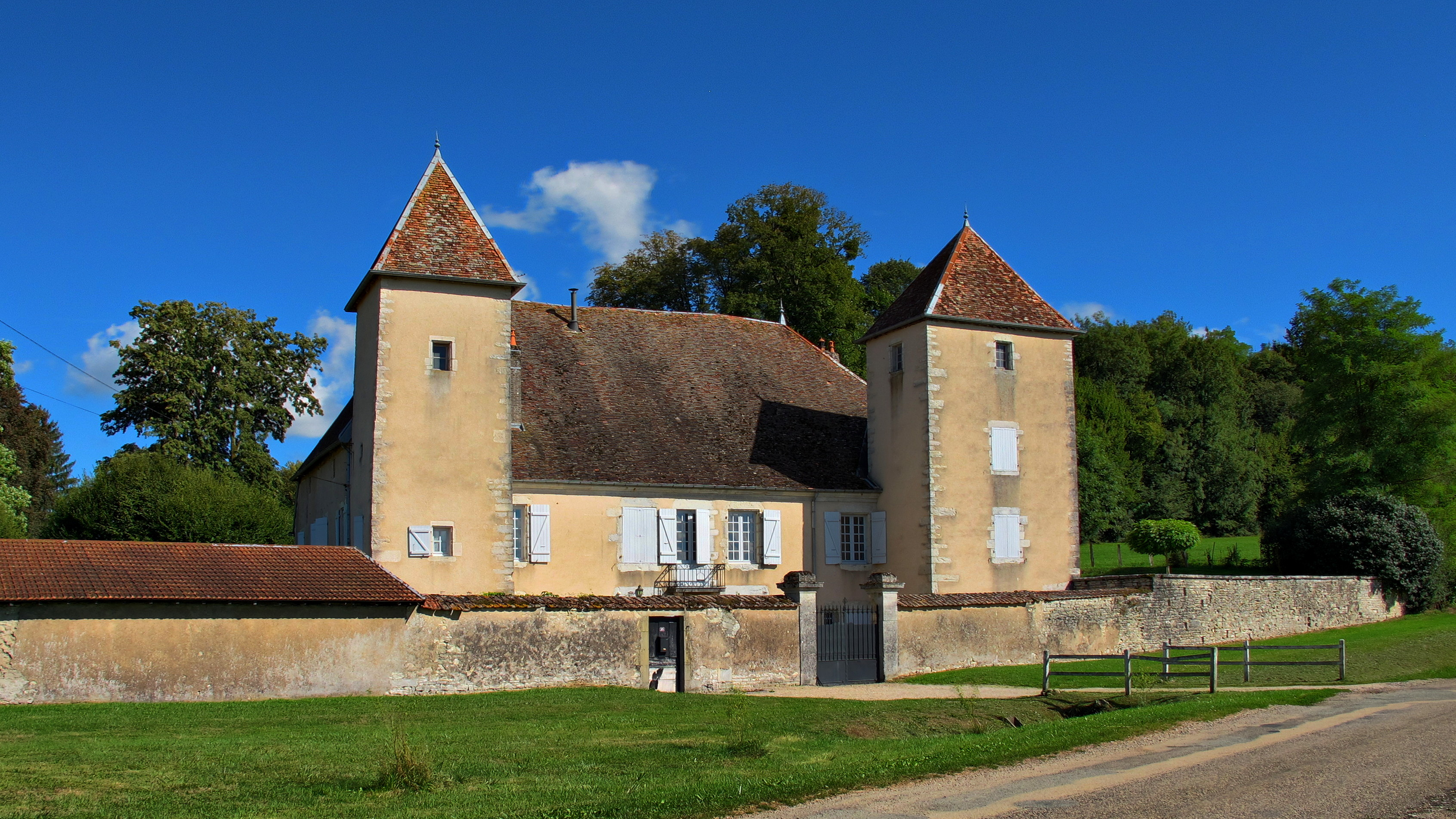
- The chateau in Sauvagney
- Location of Sauvagney
- Location within France Location within Bourgogne-Franche-Comté
- Coordinates: 47°19′28″N 5°54′16″E
- Country: France
- Region: Bourgogne-Franche-Comté
- Department: Doubs
- Arrondissement: Besançon
- Canton: Saint-Vit

Government
  - Mayor (2020–2026): Pascal Ducret
- Area^{1}: 3.95 km^{2} (1.53 sq mi)
- Highest elevation: 251 m (823 ft)
- Lowest elevation: 204 m (669 ft)
- Population (2023): 196
  - Density: 49.6/km^{2} (129/sq mi)
- Time zone: UTC+01:00 (CET)
  - Summer (DST): UTC+02:00 (CEST)
- INSEE/Postal code: 25536 /25170
- ^{1} French Land Register data, which excludes lakes, ponds, glaciers > 1 km^{2} (0.386 sq mi or 247 acres) and river estuaries.

Sauvagney (French pronunciation: [sovaɲɛ]) is a commune in the Doubs department in the Bourgogne-Franche-Comté region in eastern France.

== Geography ==
Sauvagney lies 5 km (3.1 mi) southwest of Émagny.

== Population ==
Historical population
Year	Pop.	±% p.a.
1968	98	—
1975	107	+1.26%
1982	119	+1.53%
1990	148	+2.76%
1999	165	+1.22%
2007	156	−0.70%
2012	157	+0.13%
2017	185	+3.34%
2023	196	+0.97%
Source: INSEE

== See also ==
- Communes of the Doubs department
