= Paroy =

Paroy is the name of two communes in France:

- Paroy, Doubs
- Paroy, Seine-et-Marne

== See also ==
- Paroy-en-Othe, in the Yonne département
- Paroy-sur-Saulx, in the Haute-Marne département
- Paroy-sur-Tholon, in the Yonne département
