= Courchapon =

- Commune
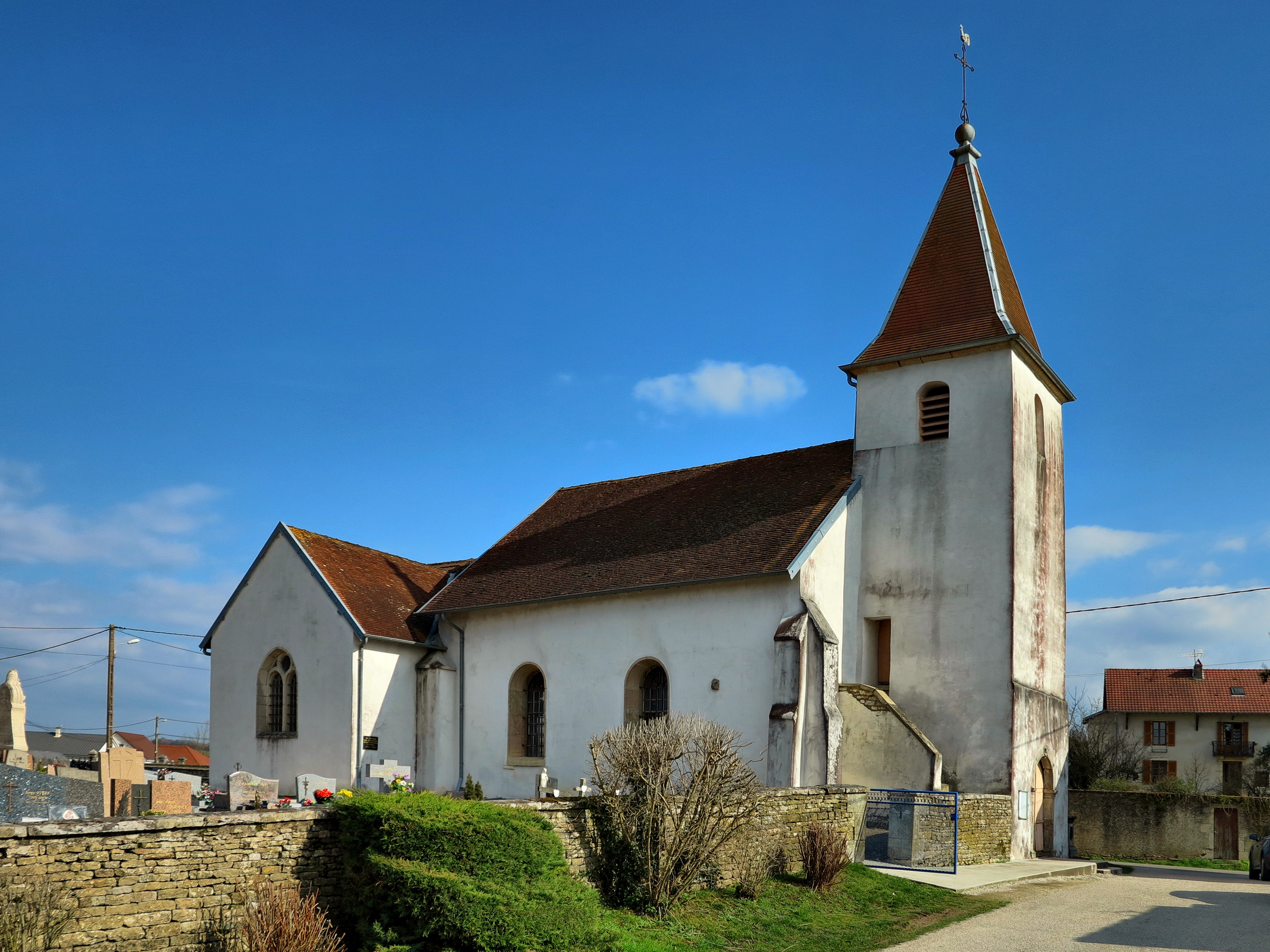
- The church in Courchapon
- Location of Courchapon
- Location within France Location within Bourgogne-Franche-Comté
- Coordinates: 47°15′52″N 5°44′52″E
- Country: France
- Region: Bourgogne-Franche-Comté
- Department: Doubs
- Arrondissement: Besançon
- Canton: Saint-Vit

Government
  - Mayor (2020–2026): Patrick Humbert
- Area^{1}: 5.31 km^{2} (2.05 sq mi)
- Highest elevation: 332 m (1,089 ft)
- Lowest elevation: 198 m (650 ft)
- Population (2023): 247
  - Density: 46.5/km^{2} (120/sq mi)
- Time zone: UTC+01:00 (CET)
  - Summer (DST): UTC+02:00 (CEST)
- INSEE/Postal code: 25172 /25170
- ^{1} French Land Register data, which excludes lakes, ponds, glaciers > 1 km^{2} (0.386 sq mi or 247 acres) and river estuaries.

Courchapon (French pronunciation: [kuʁʃapɔ̃]) is a commune in the Doubs department in the Bourgogne-Franche-Comté region in eastern France.

== Population ==
Historical population
Year	Pop.	±% p.a.
1968	75	—
1975	97	+3.74%
1982	89	−1.22%
1990	124	+4.23%
1999	140	+1.36%
2007	166	+2.15%
2012	180	+1.63%
2017	218	+3.91%
2023	247	+2.10%
Source: INSEE

== See also ==
- Communes of the Doubs department
