= Lavernay =

- Commune
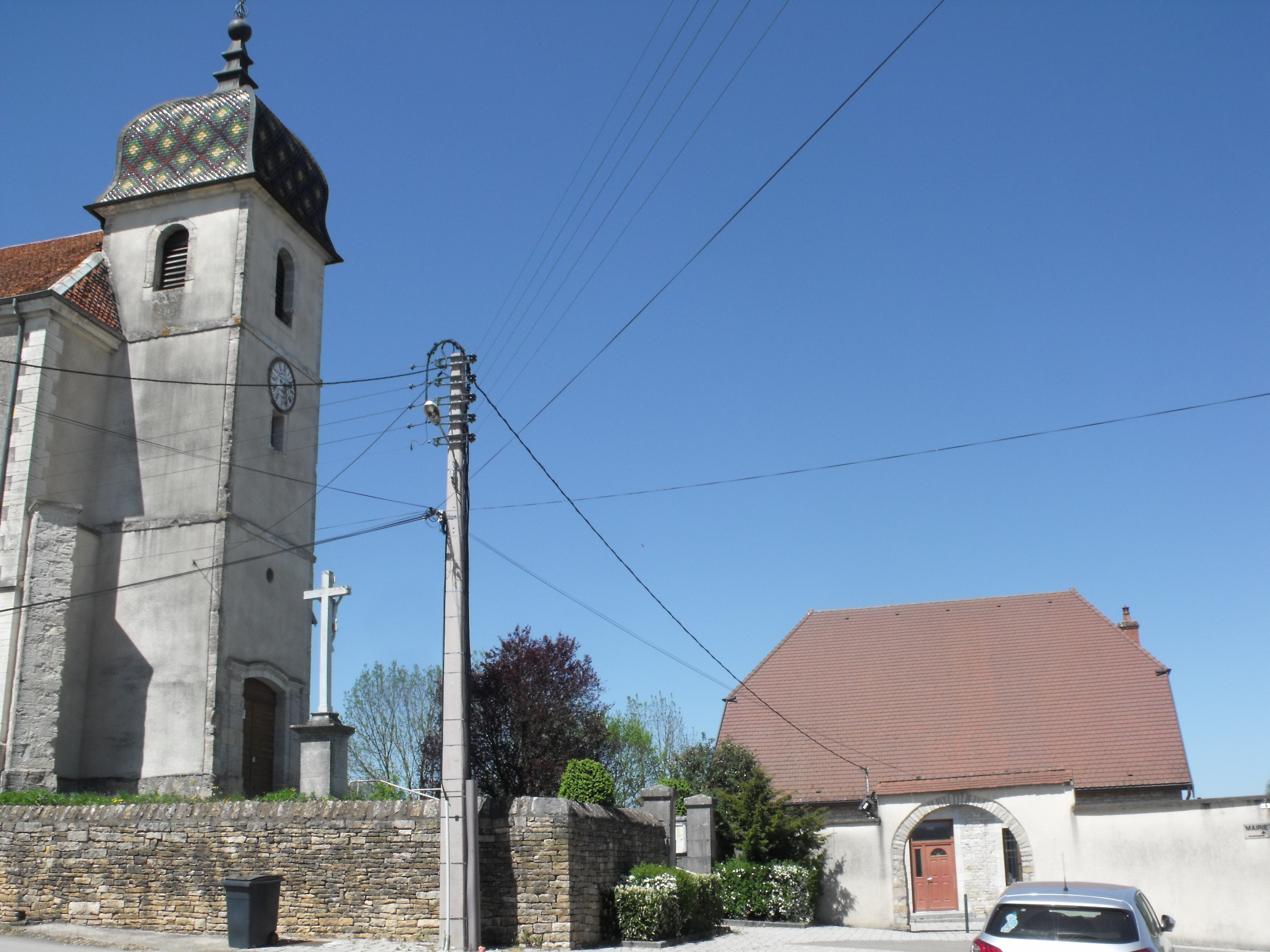
- The church and town hall in Lavernay

- Coat of arms
- Location of Lavernay
- Location within France Location within Bourgogne-Franche-Comté
- Coordinates: 47°14′50″N 5°49′06″E
- Country: France
- Region: Bourgogne-Franche-Comté
- Department: Doubs
- Arrondissement: Besançon
- Canton: Saint-Vit

Government
  - Mayor (2020–2026): Alain Pelot
- Area^{1}: 7.74 km^{2} (2.99 sq mi)
- Highest elevation: 287 m (942 ft)
- Lowest elevation: 210 m (690 ft)
- Population (2023): 589
  - Density: 76.1/km^{2} (197/sq mi)
- Time zone: UTC+01:00 (CET)
  - Summer (DST): UTC+02:00 (CEST)
- INSEE/Postal code: 25332 /25170
- ^{1} French Land Register data, which excludes lakes, ponds, glaciers > 1 km^{2} (0.386 sq mi or 247 acres) and river estuaries.

Lavernay (French pronunciation: [lavɛʁnɛ]) is a commune in the Doubs département in the Bourgogne-Franche-Comté region in eastern France.

== Geography ==
The commune is situated 15 km (9.3 mi) southwest of Besançon.

== Population ==
Historical population
Year	Pop.	±% p.a.
1968	240	—
1975	227	−0.79%
1982	264	+2.18%
1990	401	+5.36%
1999	431	+0.80%
2007	563	+3.40%
2012	580	+0.60%
2017	576	−0.14%
2023	589	+0.37%
Source: INSEE

The inhabitants of the commune are called Lavernois in French.

== See also ==
- Communes of the Doubs department
