= Chouzelot =

- Commune
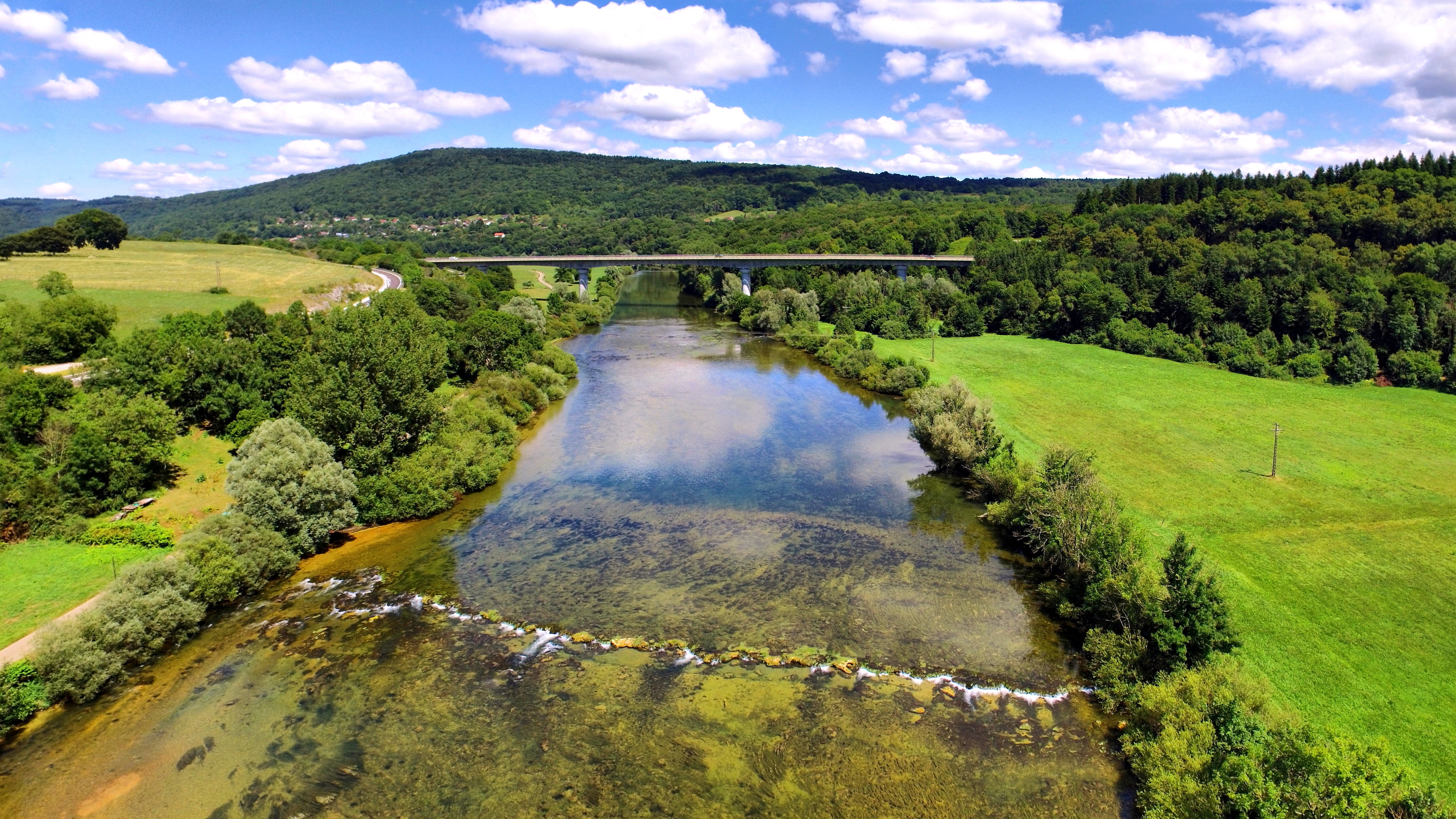
- The bridge over the Loue in Chouzelot
- Location of Chouzelot
- Location within France Location within Bourgogne-Franche-Comté
- Coordinates: 47°06′28″N 5°53′39″E
- Country: France
- Region: Bourgogne-Franche-Comté
- Department: Doubs
- Arrondissement: Besançon
- Canton: Saint-Vit
- Intercommunality: Loue-Lison

Government
  - Mayor (2020–2026): Christian Mesnier
- Area^{1}: 6.41 km^{2} (2.47 sq mi)
- Highest elevation: 499 m (1,637 ft)
- Lowest elevation: 262 m (860 ft)
- Population (2023): 249
  - Density: 38.8/km^{2} (101/sq mi)
- Time zone: UTC+01:00 (CET)
  - Summer (DST): UTC+02:00 (CEST)
- INSEE/Postal code: 25154 /25440
- ^{1} French Land Register data, which excludes lakes, ponds, glaciers > 1 km^{2} (0.386 sq mi or 247 acres) and river estuaries.

Chouzelot is a commune in the Doubs department in the Bourgogne-Franche-Comté region in eastern France.

== Population ==
Historical population
Year	Pop.	±% p.a.
1968	187	—
1975	201	+1.04%
1982	219	+1.23%
1990	239	+1.10%
1999	263	+1.07%
2007	311	+2.12%
2012	276	−2.36%
2017	269	−0.51%
2023	249	−1.28%
Source: INSEE

== See also ==
- Communes of the Doubs department
