= Berthelange =

- Commune
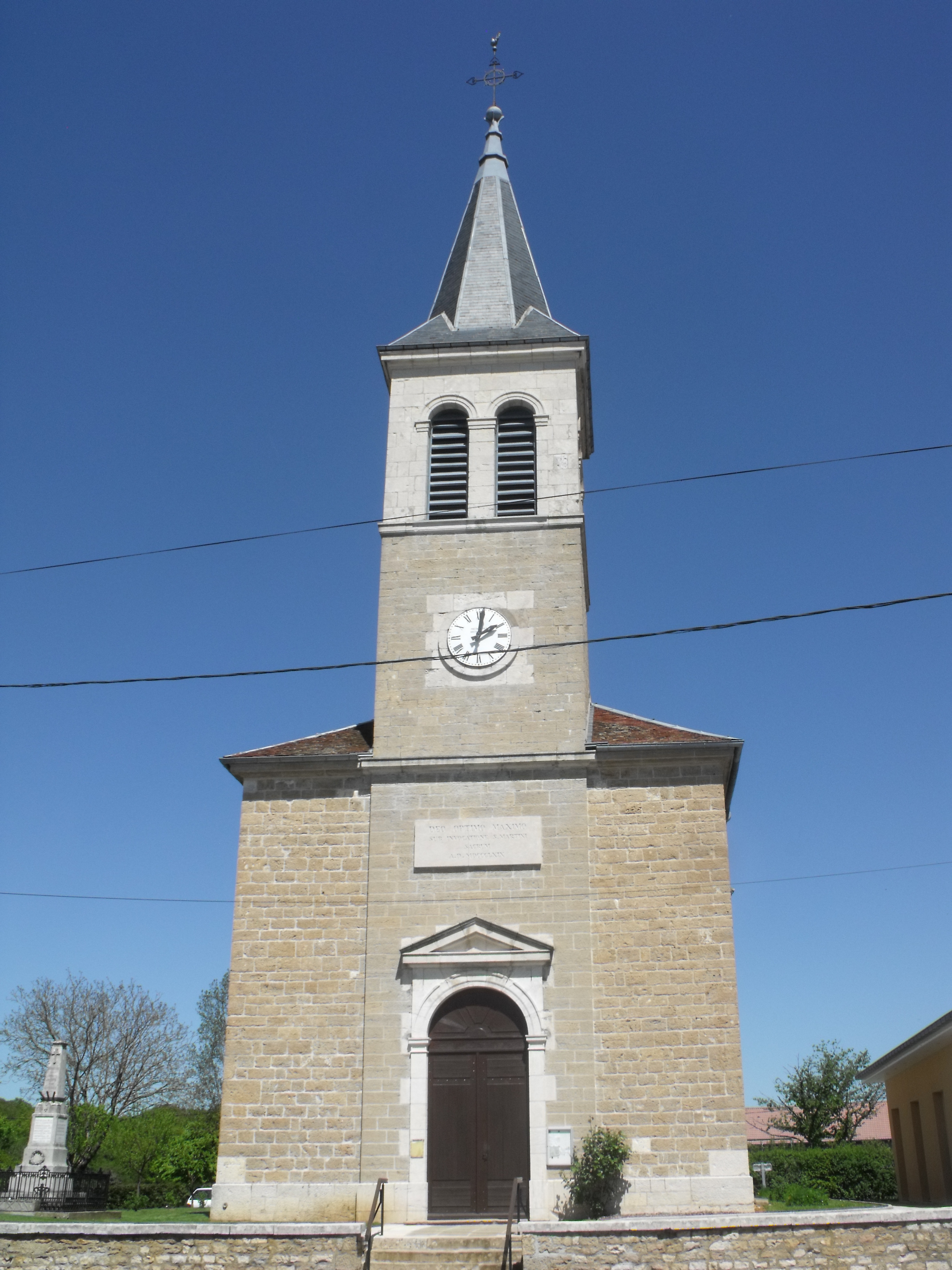
- The church in Berthelange
- Location of Berthelange
- Location within France Location within Bourgogne-Franche-Comté
- Coordinates: 47°11′55″N 5°46′48″E
- Country: France
- Region: Bourgogne-Franche-Comté
- Department: Doubs
- Arrondissement: Besançon
- Canton: Saint-Vit

Government
  - Mayor (2020–2026): Marc Dupont
- Area^{1}: 4.07 km^{2} (1.57 sq mi)
- Highest elevation: 294 m (965 ft)
- Lowest elevation: 234 m (768 ft)
- Population (2023): 354
  - Density: 87.0/km^{2} (225/sq mi)
- Time zone: UTC+01:00 (CET)
  - Summer (DST): UTC+02:00 (CEST)
- INSEE/Postal code: 25055 /25410
- ^{1} French Land Register data, which excludes lakes, ponds, glaciers > 1 km^{2} (0.386 sq mi or 247 acres) and river estuaries.

Berthelange (French pronunciation: [bɛʁtəlɑ̃ʒ]) is a commune in the Doubs department in the Bourgogne-Franche-Comté region in eastern France.

== Population ==
Historical population
Year	Pop.	±% p.a.
1968	104	—
1975	112	+1.06%
1982	169	+6.05%
1990	193	+1.67%
1999	210	+0.94%
2007	260	+2.71%
2012	291	+2.28%
2017	330	+2.55%
2023	354	+1.18%
Source: INSEE

== See also ==
- Communes of the Doubs department
