= Mercey-le-Grand =

- Commune
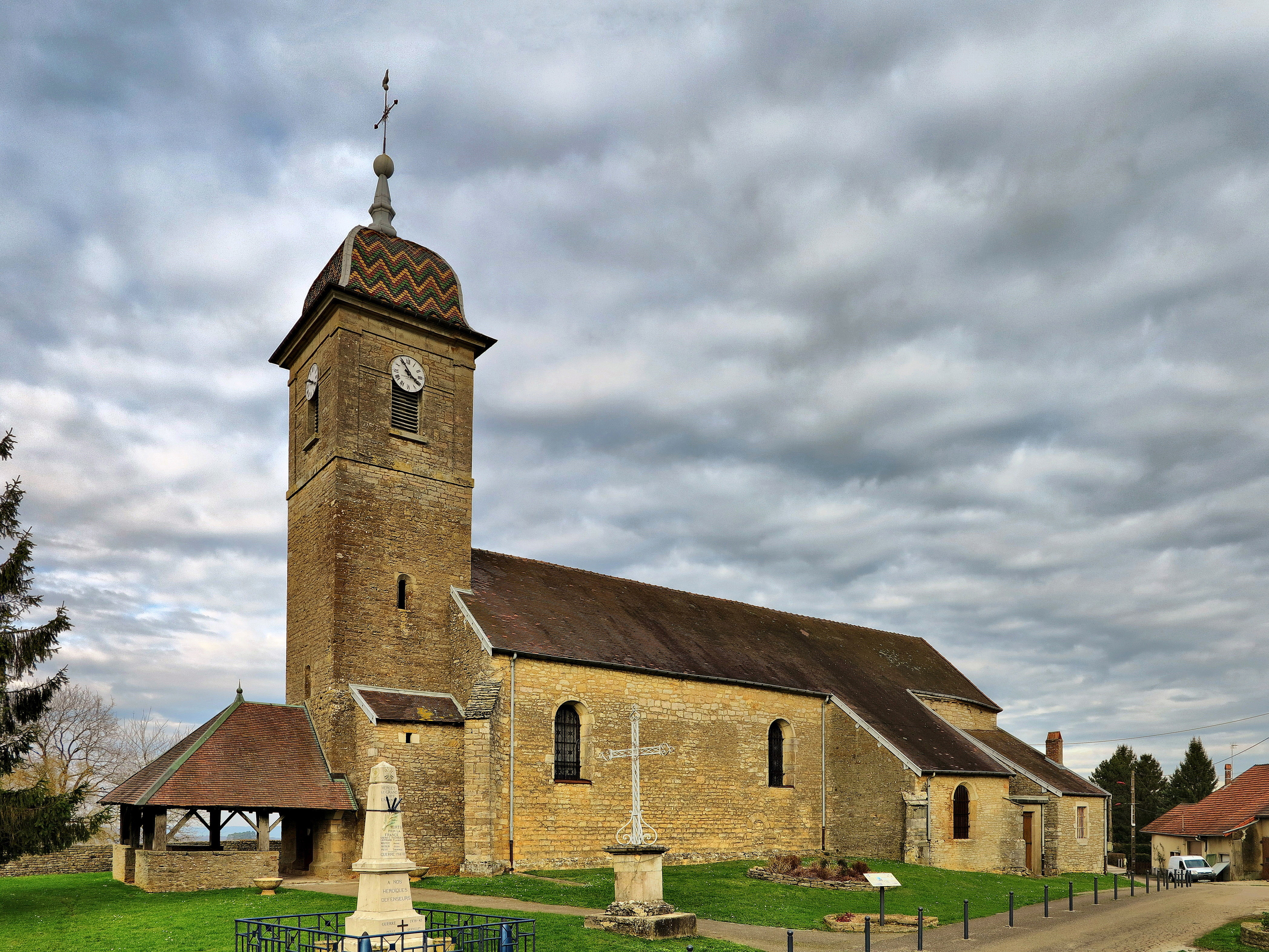
- The church in Mercey-le-Grand
- Location of Mercey-le-Grand
- Location within France Location within Bourgogne-Franche-Comté
- Coordinates: 47°13′03″N 5°44′21″E
- Country: France
- Region: Bourgogne-Franche-Comté
- Department: Doubs
- Arrondissement: Besançon
- Canton: Saint-Vit

Government
  - Mayor (2020–2026): Didier Aubry
- Area^{1}: 6.56 km^{2} (2.53 sq mi)
- Highest elevation: 302 m (991 ft)
- Lowest elevation: 229 m (751 ft)
- Population (2023): 520
  - Density: 79/km^{2} (210/sq mi)
- Time zone: UTC+01:00 (CET)
  - Summer (DST): UTC+02:00 (CEST)
- INSEE/Postal code: 25374 /25410
- ^{1} French Land Register data, which excludes lakes, ponds, glaciers > 1 km^{2} (0.386 sq mi or 247 acres) and river estuaries.

Mercey-le-Grand (French pronunciation: [mɛʁsɛ lə ɡʁɑ̃]) is a commune in the Doubs department in the Bourgogne-Franche-Comté region in eastern France.

== Geography ==
The commune lies 26 km (16 mi) west of Besançon.

== Population ==
Historical population
Year	Pop.	±% p.a.
1968	207	—
1975	213	+0.41%
1982	338	+6.82%
1990	366	+1.00%
1999	408	+1.21%
2007	452	+1.29%
2012	502	+2.12%
2017	542	+1.55%
2023	520	−0.69%
Source: INSEE

== See also ==
- Communes of the Doubs department
