= Burgille =

- Commune
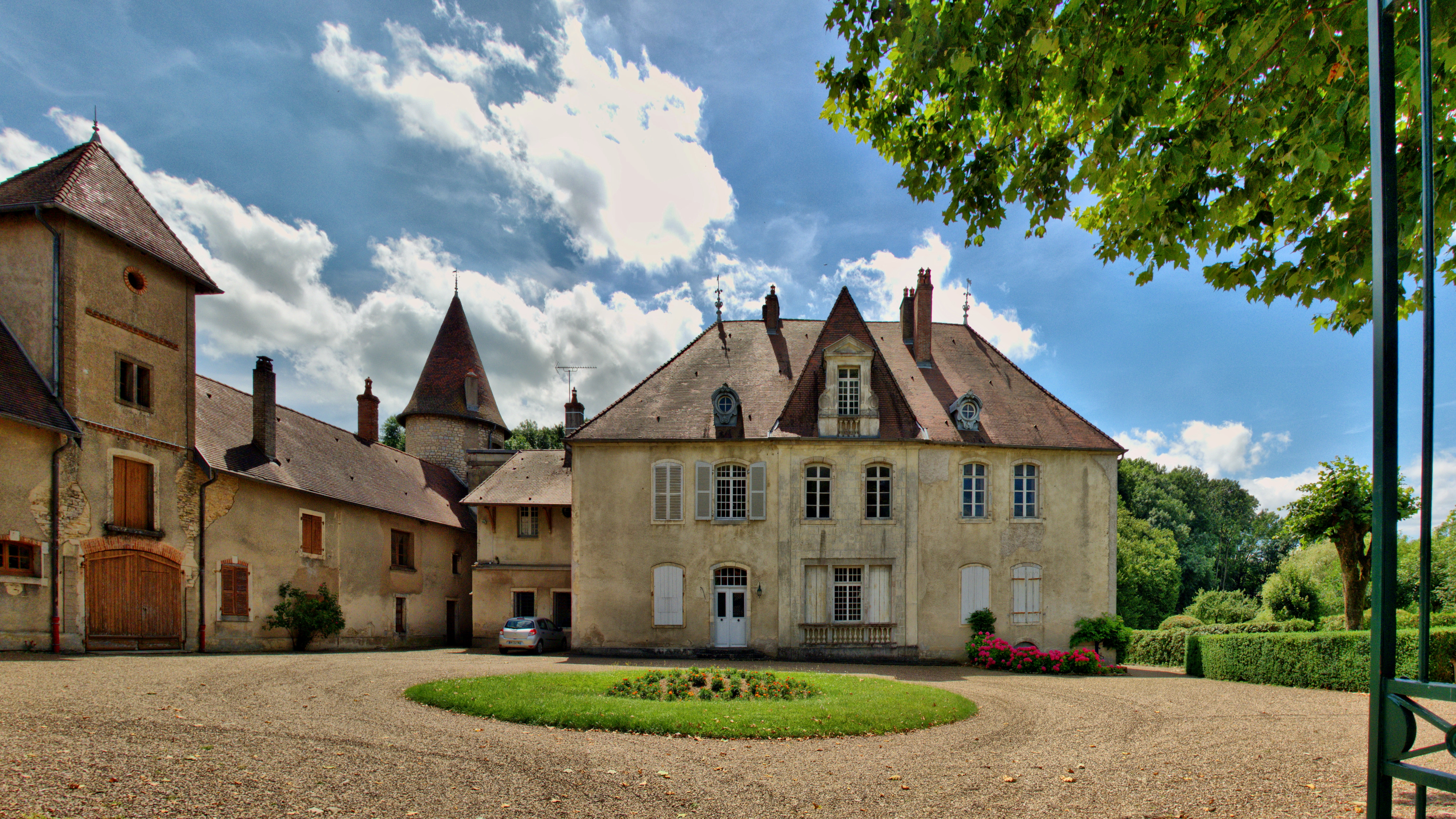
- The chateau in Burgille
- Location of Burgille
- Location within France Location within Bourgogne-Franche-Comté
- Coordinates: 47°16′07″N 5°46′34″E
- Country: France
- Region: Bourgogne-Franche-Comté
- Department: Doubs
- Arrondissement: Besançon
- Canton: Saint-Vit

Government
  - Mayor (2020–2026): Thierry Decosterd
- Area^{1}: 9.28 km^{2} (3.58 sq mi)
- Highest elevation: 315 m (1,033 ft)
- Lowest elevation: 199 m (653 ft)
- Population (2023): 562
  - Density: 60.6/km^{2} (157/sq mi)
- Time zone: UTC+01:00 (CET)
  - Summer (DST): UTC+02:00 (CEST)
- INSEE/Postal code: 25101 /25170
- ^{1} French Land Register data, which excludes lakes, ponds, glaciers > 1 km^{2} (0.386 sq mi or 247 acres) and river estuaries.

Burgille (French pronunciation: [byʁʒij]) is a commune in the Doubs department in the Bourgogne-Franche-Comté region in eastern France.

== Population ==
Historical population
Year	Pop.	±% p.a.
1968	186	—
1975	202	+1.19%
1982	231	+1.93%
1990	250	+0.99%
1999	327	+3.03%
2007	444	+3.90%
2012	551	+4.41%
2017	565	+0.50%
2023	562	−0.09%
Source: INSEE

== See also ==
- Communes of the Doubs department
