= Palantine =

- Commune
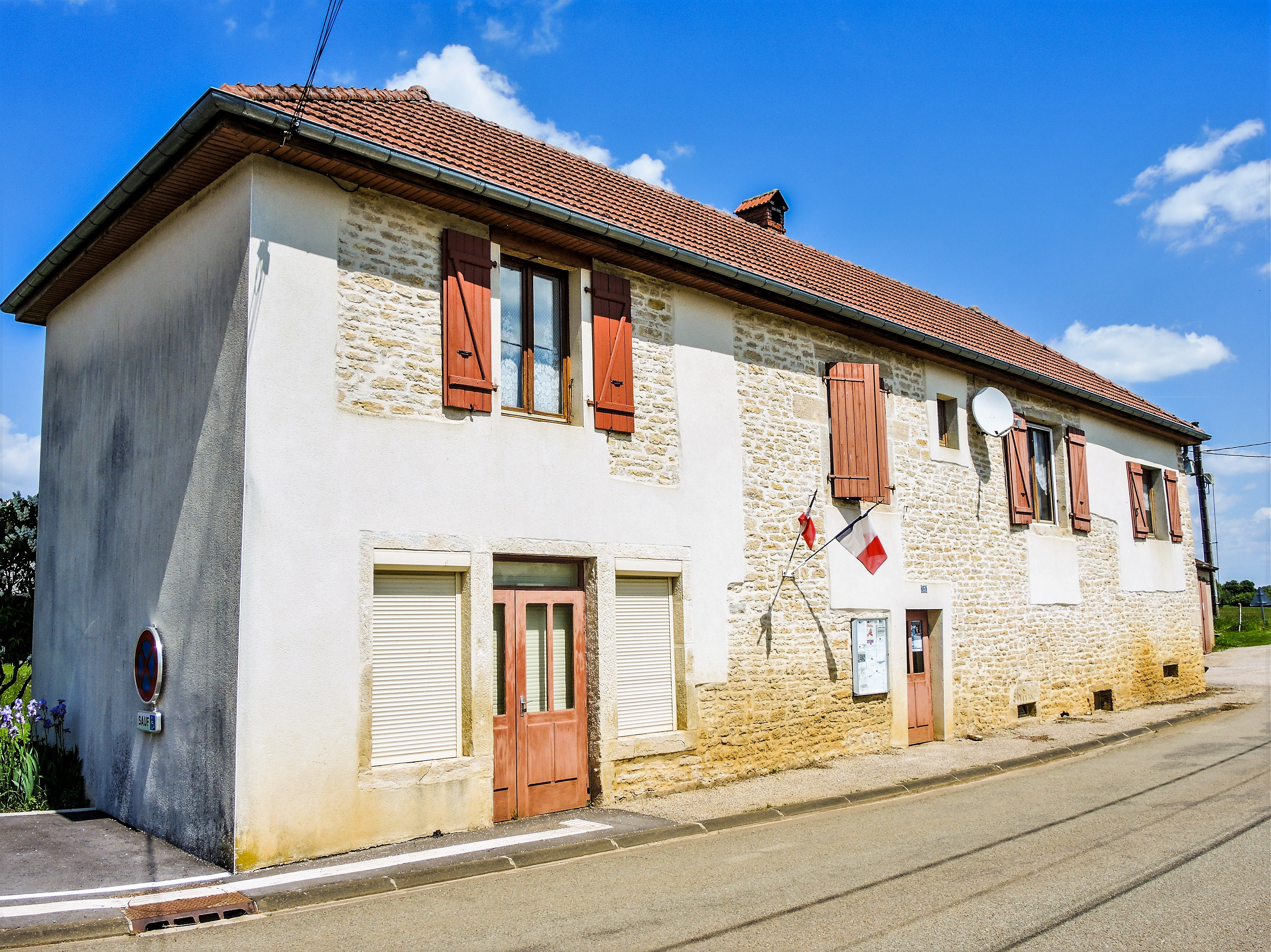
- The town hall in Palantine
- Location of Palantine
- Location within France Location within Bourgogne-Franche-Comté
- Coordinates: 47°05′23″N 5°56′37″E
- Country: France
- Region: Bourgogne-Franche-Comté
- Department: Doubs
- Arrondissement: Besançon
- Canton: Saint-Vit
- Intercommunality: Loue-Lison

Government
  - Mayor (2020–2026): Bernadette Faillenet
- Area^{1}: 4.31 km^{2} (1.66 sq mi)
- Highest elevation: 441 m (1,447 ft)
- Lowest elevation: 359 m (1,178 ft)
- Population (2023): 61
  - Density: 14/km^{2} (37/sq mi)
- Time zone: UTC+01:00 (CET)
  - Summer (DST): UTC+02:00 (CEST)
- INSEE/Postal code: 25443 /25440
- ^{1} French Land Register data, which excludes lakes, ponds, glaciers > 1 km^{2} (0.386 sq mi or 247 acres) and river estuaries.

Palantine (French pronunciation: [palɑ̃tin]) is a commune in the Doubs department in the Bourgogne-Franche-Comté region in eastern France.

== Population ==
Historical population
Year	Pop.	±% p.a.
1968	33	—
1975	30	−1.35%
1982	38	+3.43%
1990	40	+0.64%
1999	36	−1.16%
2007	36	+0.00%
2012	56	+9.24%
2017	72	+5.15%
2023	61	−2.73%
Source: INSEE

== See also ==
- Communes of the Doubs department
