= Buffard =

- Commune
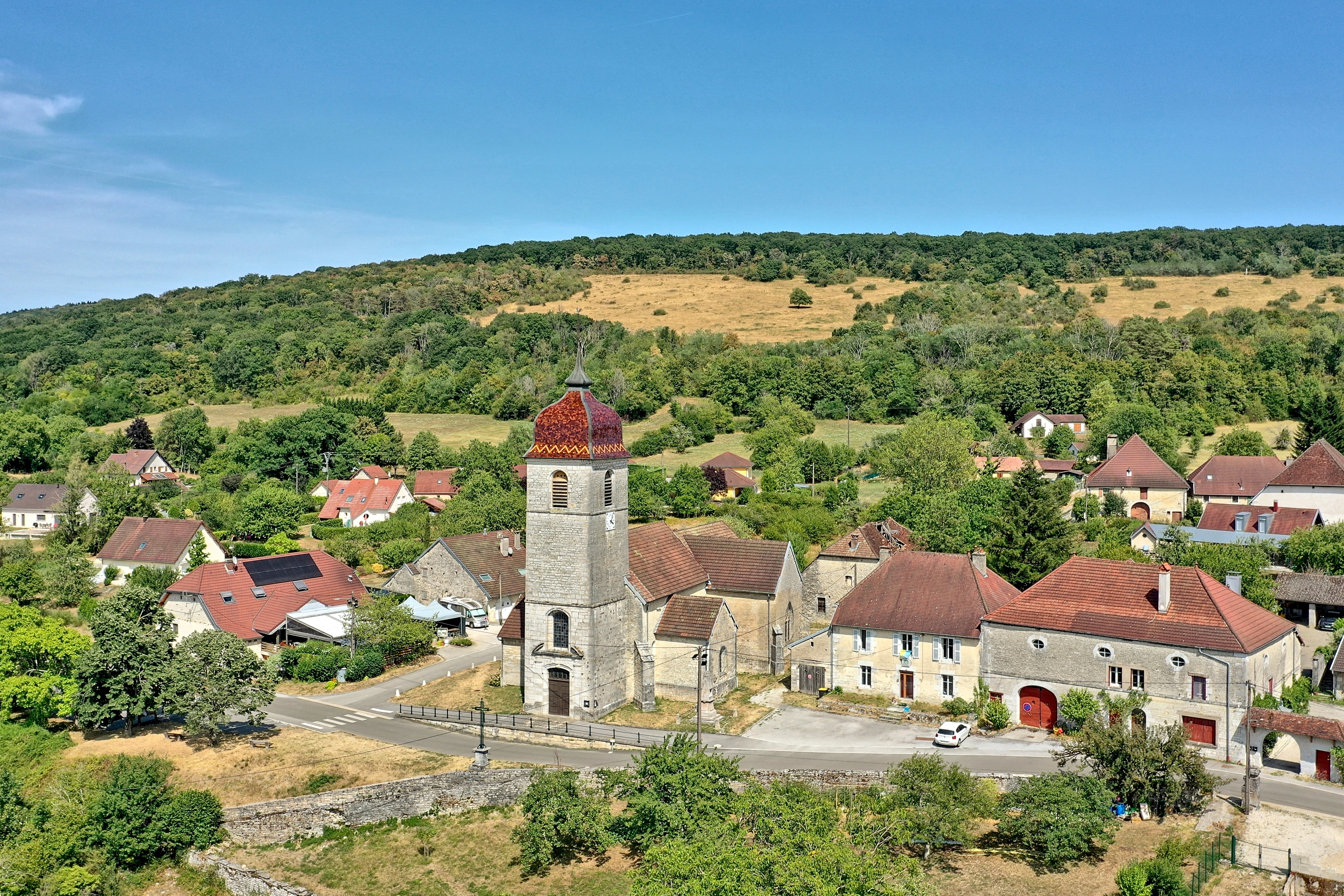
- The church in Buffard
- Location of Buffard
- Location within France Location within Bourgogne-Franche-Comté
- Coordinates: 47°02′15″N 5°49′32″E
- Country: France
- Region: Bourgogne-Franche-Comté
- Department: Doubs
- Arrondissement: Besançon
- Canton: Saint-Vit
- Intercommunality: Loue-Lison

Government
  - Mayor (2020–2026): Joëlle Maurice
- Area^{1}: 8.1 km^{2} (3.1 sq mi)
- Highest elevation: 450 m (1,480 ft)
- Lowest elevation: 236 m (774 ft)
- Population (2023): 187
  - Density: 23/km^{2} (60/sq mi)
- Time zone: UTC+01:00 (CET)
  - Summer (DST): UTC+02:00 (CEST)
- INSEE/Postal code: 25098 /25440
- ^{1} French Land Register data, which excludes lakes, ponds, glaciers > 1 km^{2} (0.386 sq mi or 247 acres) and river estuaries.

Buffard (French pronunciation: [byfaʁ]) is a commune in the Doubs department in the Bourgogne-Franche-Comté region in eastern France.

== Population ==
Historical population
| Year | Pop. | ±% p.a. |
|---|---|---|
| 1968 | 149 | — |
| 1975 | 110 | −4.24% |
| 1982 | 126 | +1.96% |
| 1990 | 147 | +1.95% |
| 1999 | 135 | −0.94% |
| 2007 | 159 | +2.07% |
| 2012 | 155 | −0.51% |
| 2017 | 169 | +1.74% |
| 2023 | 187 | +1.70% |
Source: INSEE

== Personalities ==
Armand-Émile Mathey-Doret (born 1853 in Besançon, Doubs – 1931 in Buffard) was the only French artist to be allowed by Queen Victoria to make pictures of her. He received the French Legion of Honor in 1901. He was elected Mayor circa 1908. His art-works are at the following museums held at the Hermitage Museum (Lord Warton), Le Louvre (portrait de Charles 1er d'Angleterre / Ruppert de bavière et son frère), and Windsor Castle (Rubens).

== See also ==
- Communes of the Doubs department
