= Canton of Saint-Vit =

Coordinates: 47.18°N 5.81°E

The canton of Saint-Vit is an administrative division of the Doubs department, eastern France. It was created at the French canton reorganisation which came into effect in March 2015. Its seat is in Saint-Vit.

It consists of the following communes:

1. Abbans-Dessous
2. Abbans-Dessus
3. Arc-et-Senans
4. Bartherans
5. Berthelange
6. Brères
7. Buffard
8. Burgille
9. By
10. Byans-sur-Doubs
11. Cessey
12. Charnay
13. Chay
14. Chenecey-Buillon
15. Chevigney-sur-l'Ognon
16. Chouzelot
17. Corcelles-Ferrières
18. Corcondray
19. Courcelles
20. Courchapon
21. Cussey-sur-Lison
22. Échay
23. Émagny
24. Épeugney
25. Étrabonne
26. Ferrières-les-Bois
27. Fourg
28. Franey
29. Goux-sous-Landet
30. Jallerange
31. Lantenne-Vertière
32. Lavans-Quingey
33. Lavernay
34. Liesle
35. Lombard
36. Mercey-le-Grand
37. Mesmay
38. Moncley
39. Montrond-le-Château
40. Le Moutherot
41. Myon
42. Palantine
43. Paroy
44. Pessans
45. Placey
46. Pouilley-Français
47. Quingey
48. Recologne
49. Rennes-sur-Loue
50. Ronchaux
51. Roset-Fluans
52. Rouhe
53. Ruffey-le-Château
54. Rurey
55. Saint-Vit
56. Samson
57. Sauvagney
58. Le Val
59. Velesmes-Essarts
60. Villars-Saint-Georges
61. Villers-Buzon
