= Placey =

- Commune
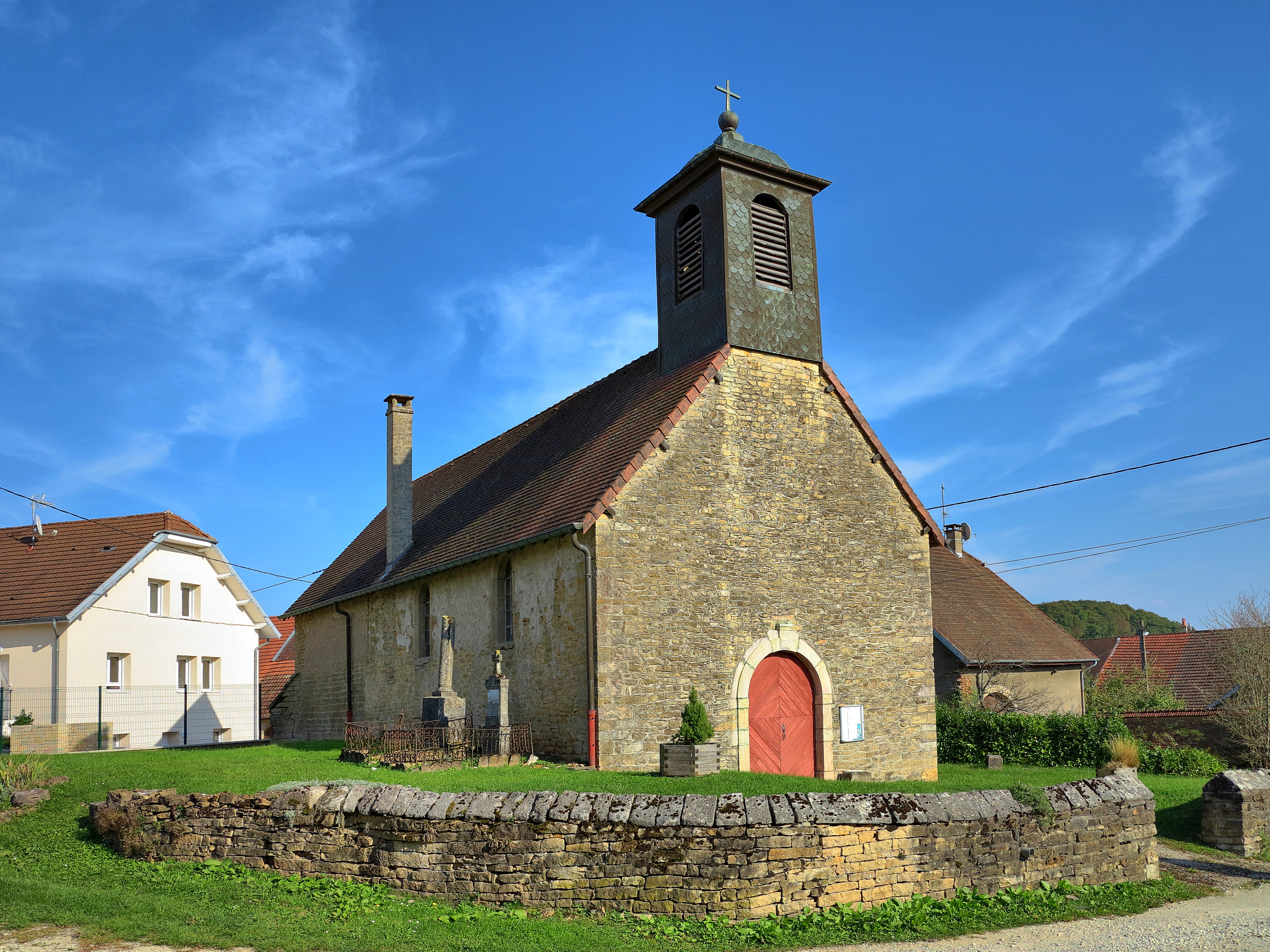
- The chapel in Placey

- Coat of arms
- Location of Placey
- Location within France Location within Bourgogne-Franche-Comté
- Coordinates: 47°15′39″N 5°50′51″E
- Country: France
- Region: Bourgogne-Franche-Comté
- Department: Doubs
- Arrondissement: Besançon
- Canton: Saint-Vit

Government
  - Mayor (2020–2026): Frédéric Reigney
- Area^{1}: 2.57 km^{2} (0.99 sq mi)
- Highest elevation: 281 m (922 ft)
- Lowest elevation: 215 m (705 ft)
- Population (2023): 197
  - Density: 76.7/km^{2} (199/sq mi)
- Time zone: UTC+01:00 (CET)
  - Summer (DST): UTC+02:00 (CEST)
- INSEE/Postal code: 25455 /25170
- ^{1} French Land Register data, which excludes lakes, ponds, glaciers > 1 km^{2} (0.386 sq mi or 247 acres) and river estuaries.

Placey (French pronunciation: [plasɛ]) is a commune in the Doubs department in the Bourgogne-Franche-Comté region in eastern France.

== Population ==
Historical population
Year	Pop.	±% p.a.
1968	70	—
1975	107	+6.25%
1982	151	+5.04%
1990	164	+1.04%
1999	165	+0.07%
2007	161	−0.31%
2012	159	−0.25%
2017	198	+4.48%
2023	197	−0.08%
Source: INSEE

== See also ==
- Communes of the Doubs department
