= Lantenne-Vertière =

- Commune
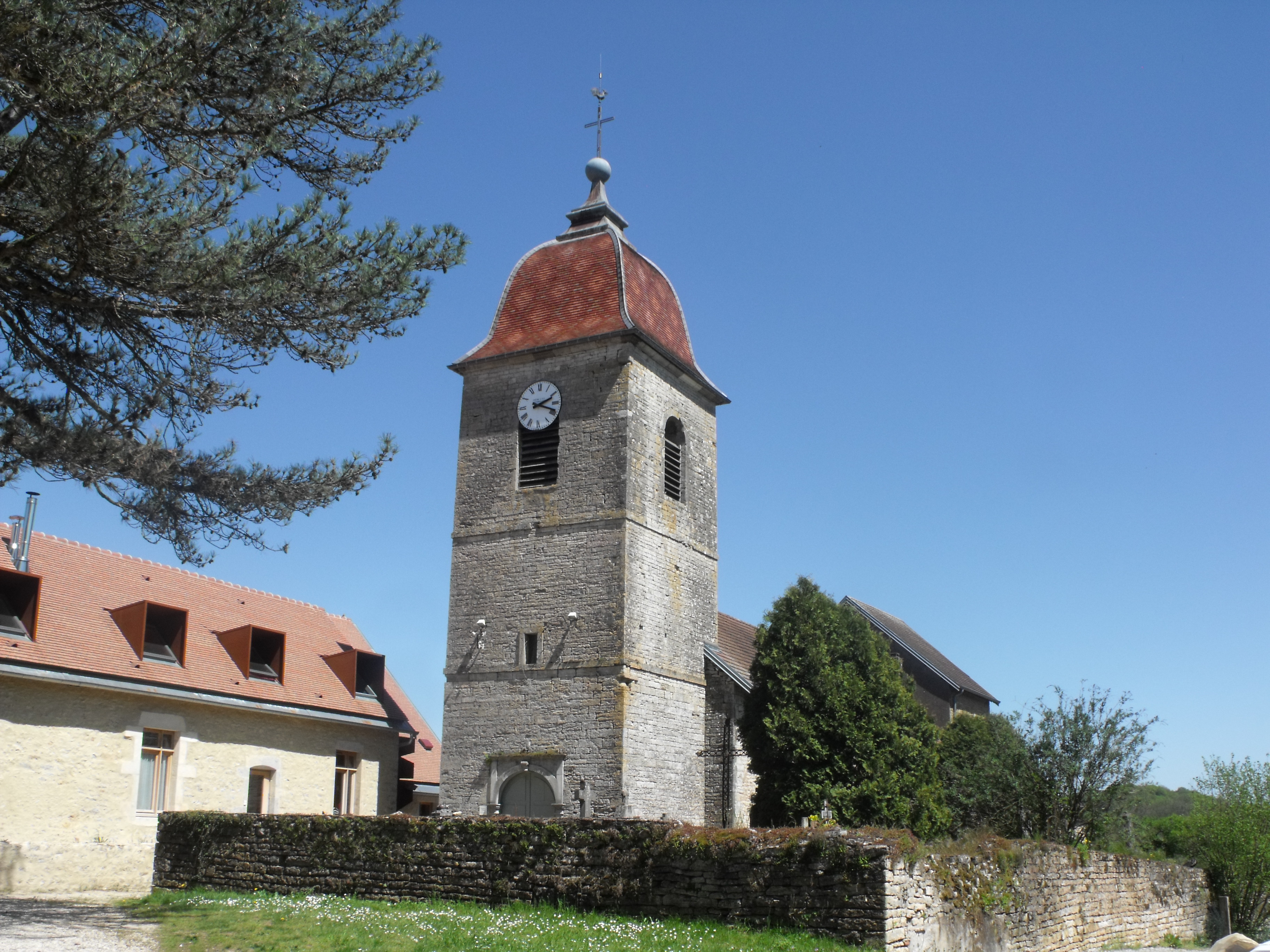
- The church in Lantenne-Vertière

- Coat of arms
- Location of Lantenne-Vertière
- Location within France Location within Bourgogne-Franche-Comté
- Coordinates: 47°14′00″N 5°46′46″E
- Country: France
- Region: Bourgogne-Franche-Comté
- Department: Doubs
- Arrondissement: Besançon
- Canton: Saint-Vit

Government
  - Mayor (2020–2026): Thierry Malesieux
- Area^{1}: 9.88 km^{2} (3.81 sq mi)
- Highest elevation: 311 m (1,020 ft)
- Lowest elevation: 221 m (725 ft)
- Population (2023): 562
  - Density: 56.9/km^{2} (147/sq mi)
- Time zone: UTC+01:00 (CET)
  - Summer (DST): UTC+02:00 (CEST)
- INSEE/Postal code: 25326 /25170
- ^{1} French Land Register data, which excludes lakes, ponds, glaciers > 1 km^{2} (0.386 sq mi or 247 acres) and river estuaries.

Lantenne-Vertière (French pronunciation: [lɑ̃tɛn vɛʁtjɛʁ]) is a commune in the Doubs department in the Bourgogne-Franche-Comté region in eastern France.

== History ==
The 17th-century castle was built in 1687 for the Lord of Vertière and then belonged to the Saint Claude family.

== Population ==
Historical population
Year	Pop.	±% p.a.
1968	272	—
1975	273	+0.05%
1982	277	+0.21%
1990	311	+1.46%
1999	458	+4.39%
2007	526	+1.75%
2012	534	+0.30%
2017	534	+0.00%
2023	562	+0.86%
Source: INSEE

== See also ==
- Communes of the Doubs department
