= Moncley =

- Commune
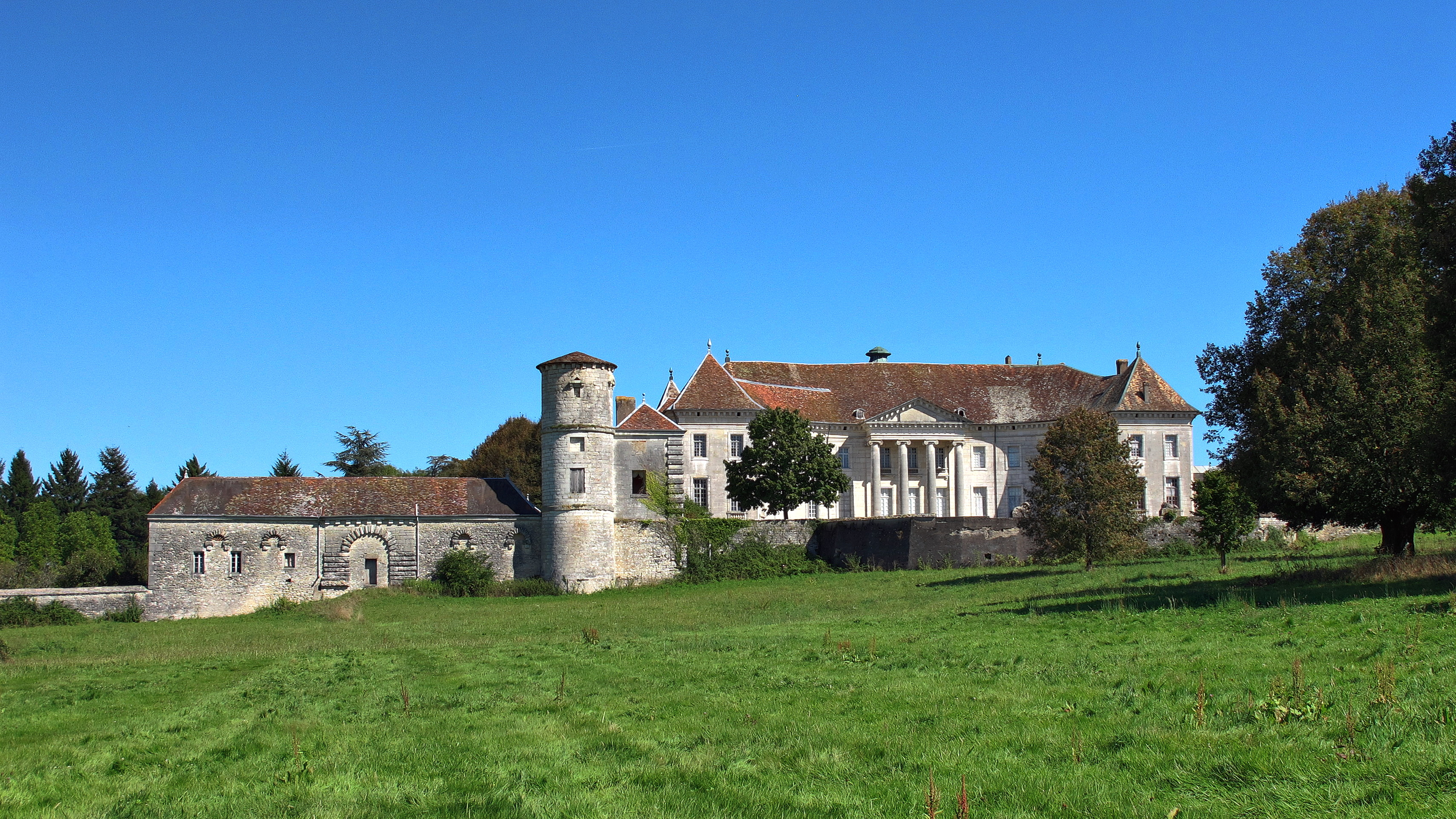
- Castle
- Location of Moncley
- Location within France Location within Bourgogne-Franche-Comté
- Coordinates: 47°18′33″N 5°53′33″E
- Country: France
- Region: Bourgogne-Franche-Comté
- Department: Doubs
- Arrondissement: Besançon
- Canton: Saint-Vit

Government
  - Mayor (2020–2026): Patrick Meutelet
- Area^{1}: 7.92 km^{2} (3.06 sq mi)
- Highest elevation: 255 m (837 ft)
- Lowest elevation: 204 m (669 ft)
- Population (2023): 308
  - Density: 38.9/km^{2} (101/sq mi)
- Time zone: UTC+01:00 (CET)
  - Summer (DST): UTC+02:00 (CEST)
- INSEE/Postal code: 25383 /25170
- ^{1} French Land Register data, which excludes lakes, ponds, glaciers > 1 km^{2} (0.386 sq mi or 247 acres) and river estuaries.

Moncley (French pronunciation: [mɔ̃klɛ]) is a commune in the Doubs department in the Bourgogne-Franche-Comté region in eastern France.

== Geography ==
Moncley lies 17 km (11 mi) northwest of Besançon in the valley of the Ognon. The river forms the boundary with the department of Haute-Saône.

== Population ==
Historical population
Year	Pop.	±% p.a.
1968	175	—
1975	168	−0.58%
1982	231	+4.65%
1990	221	−0.55%
1999	282	+2.75%
2007	331	+2.02%
2012	311	−1.24%
2017	280	−2.08%
2023	308	+1.60%
Source: INSEE

== See also ==
- Communes of the Doubs department
