= Corcondray =

- Commune
- Location of Corcondray
- Location within France Location within Bourgogne-Franche-Comté
- Coordinates: 47°13′53″N 5°49′35″E
- Country: France
- Region: Bourgogne-Franche-Comté
- Department: Doubs
- Arrondissement: Besançon
- Canton: Saint-Vit

Government
  - Mayor (2020–2026): Daniel Pouret
- Area^{1}: 5.38 km^{2} (2.08 sq mi)
- Highest elevation: 298 m (978 ft)
- Lowest elevation: 214 m (702 ft)
- Population (2023): 148
  - Density: 27.5/km^{2} (71.2/sq mi)
- Time zone: UTC+01:00 (CET)
  - Summer (DST): UTC+02:00 (CEST)
- INSEE/Postal code: 25164 /25410
- ^{1} French Land Register data, which excludes lakes, ponds, glaciers > 1 km^{2} (0.386 sq mi or 247 acres) and river estuaries.

Corcondray (French pronunciation: [kɔʁkɔ̃dʁɛ]) is a commune in the Doubs department in the Bourgogne-Franche-Comté region in eastern France.

== Population ==
Historical population
Year	Pop.	±% p.a.
1968	102	—
1975	108	+0.82%
1982	118	+1.27%
1990	127	+0.92%
1999	130	+0.26%
2007	117	−1.31%
2012	133	+2.60%
2017	144	+1.60%
2023	148	+0.46%
Source: INSEE

== See also ==
- Communes of the Doubs department
