= Chevigney-sur-l'Ognon =

- Commune
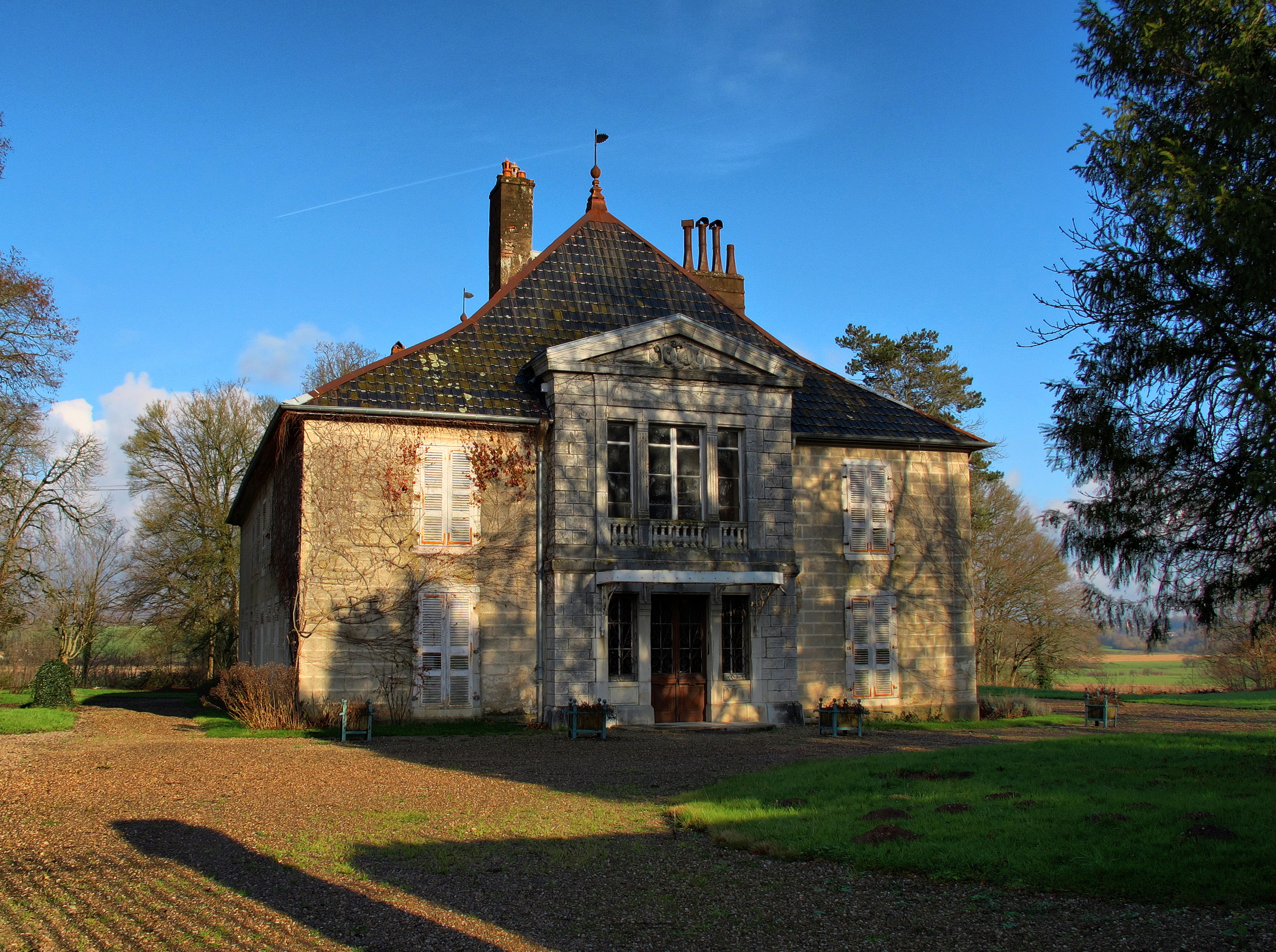
- The chateau in Chevigney-sur-l'Ognon
- Location of Chevigney-sur-l'Ognon
- Location within France Location within Bourgogne-Franche-Comté
- Coordinates: 47°17′55″N 5°50′20″E
- Country: France
- Region: Bourgogne-Franche-Comté
- Department: Doubs
- Arrondissement: Besançon
- Canton: Saint-Vit

Government
  - Mayor (2020–2026): Fabrice Bigot
- Area^{1}: 4.58 km^{2} (1.77 sq mi)
- Highest elevation: 241 m (791 ft)
- Lowest elevation: 202 m (663 ft)
- Population (2023): 296
  - Density: 64.6/km^{2} (167/sq mi)
- Time zone: UTC+01:00 (CET)
  - Summer (DST): UTC+02:00 (CEST)
- INSEE/Postal code: 25150 /25170
- ^{1} French Land Register data, which excludes lakes, ponds, glaciers > 1 km^{2} (0.386 sq mi or 247 acres) and river estuaries.

Chevigney-sur-l'Ognon (French pronunciation: [ʃəviɲɛ syʁ lɔɲɔ̃], literally Chevigney on the Ognon) is a commune in the Doubs department in the Bourgogne-Franche-Comté region in eastern France.

== Population ==
Historical population
Year	Pop.	±% p.a.
1968	95	—
1975	89	−0.93%
1982	212	+13.20%
1990	240	+1.56%
1999	240	+0.00%
2007	244	+0.21%
2012	238	−0.50%
2017	292	+4.17%
2023	296	+0.23%
Source: INSEE

== See also ==
- Ognon (Franche-Comté)
- Communes of the Doubs department
