= Mesmay =

- Commune
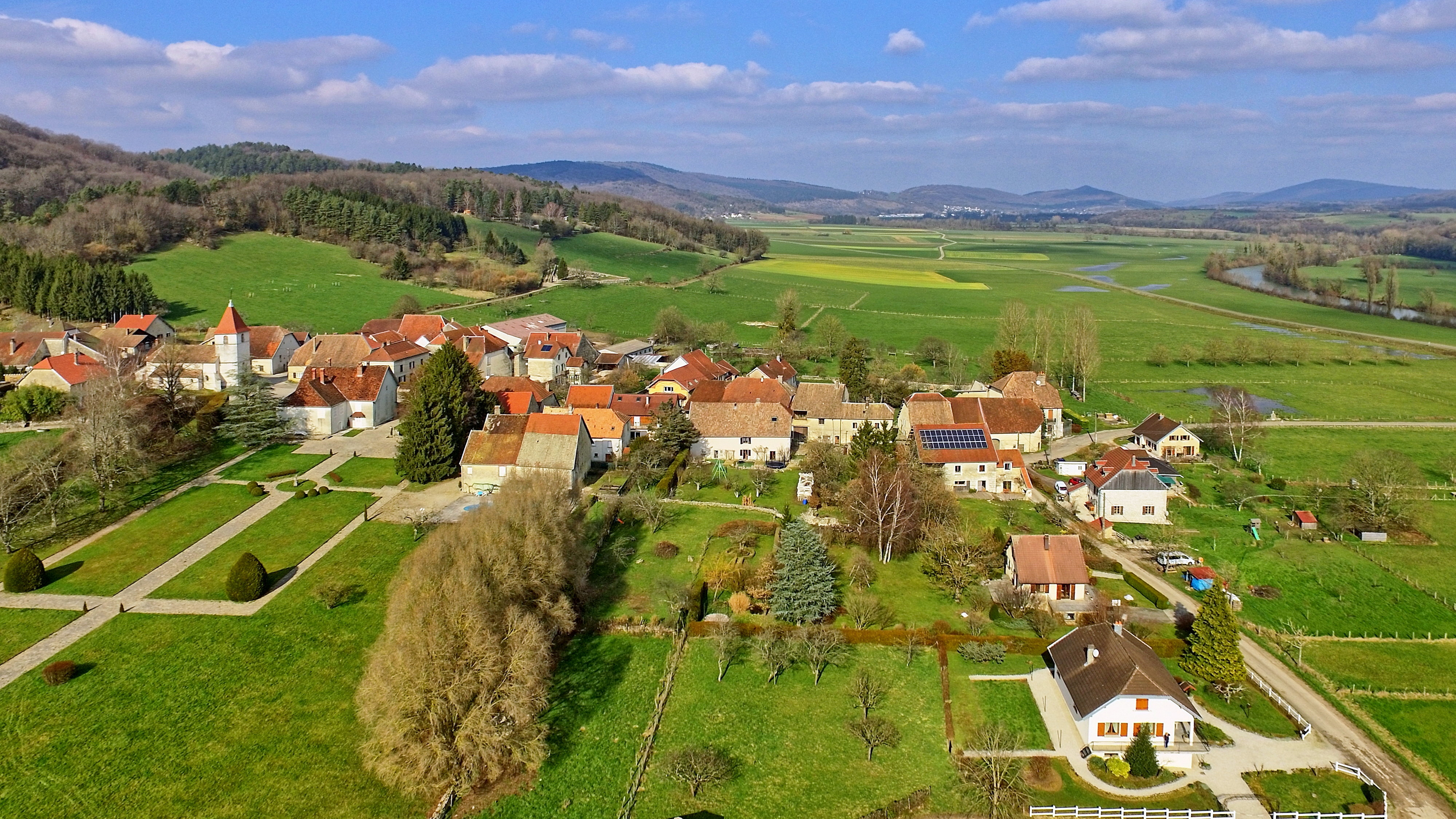
- A general view of Mesmay
- Location of Mesmay
- Location within France Location within Bourgogne-Franche-Comté
- Coordinates: 47°03′43″N 5°51′10″E
- Country: France
- Region: Bourgogne-Franche-Comté
- Department: Doubs
- Arrondissement: Besançon
- Canton: Saint-Vit
- Intercommunality: Loue-Lison

Government
  - Mayor (2020–2026): Jean-Louis Pogliano
- Area^{1}: 3.11 km^{2} (1.20 sq mi)
- Highest elevation: 436 m (1,430 ft)
- Lowest elevation: 253 m (830 ft)
- Population (2023): 67
  - Density: 22/km^{2} (56/sq mi)
- Time zone: UTC+01:00 (CET)
  - Summer (DST): UTC+02:00 (CEST)
- INSEE/Postal code: 25379 /25440
- ^{1} French Land Register data, which excludes lakes, ponds, glaciers > 1 km^{2} (0.386 sq mi or 247 acres) and river estuaries.

Mesmay (French pronunciation: [mɛmɛ]) is a commune in the Doubs department in the Bourgogne-Franche-Comté region in eastern France.

== Geography ==
The commune lies 6 km (3.7 mi) southwest of Quingey in the valley of the Loue River.

== Population ==
Historical population
Year	Pop.	±% p.a.
1968	73	—
1975	55	−3.96%
1982	63	+1.96%
1990	76	+2.37%
1999	71	−0.75%
2007	66	−0.91%
2012	70	+1.18%
2017	71	+0.28%
2023	67	−0.96%
Source: INSEE

== See also ==
- Communes of the Doubs department
