= Charnay, Doubs =

Charnay
- Commune
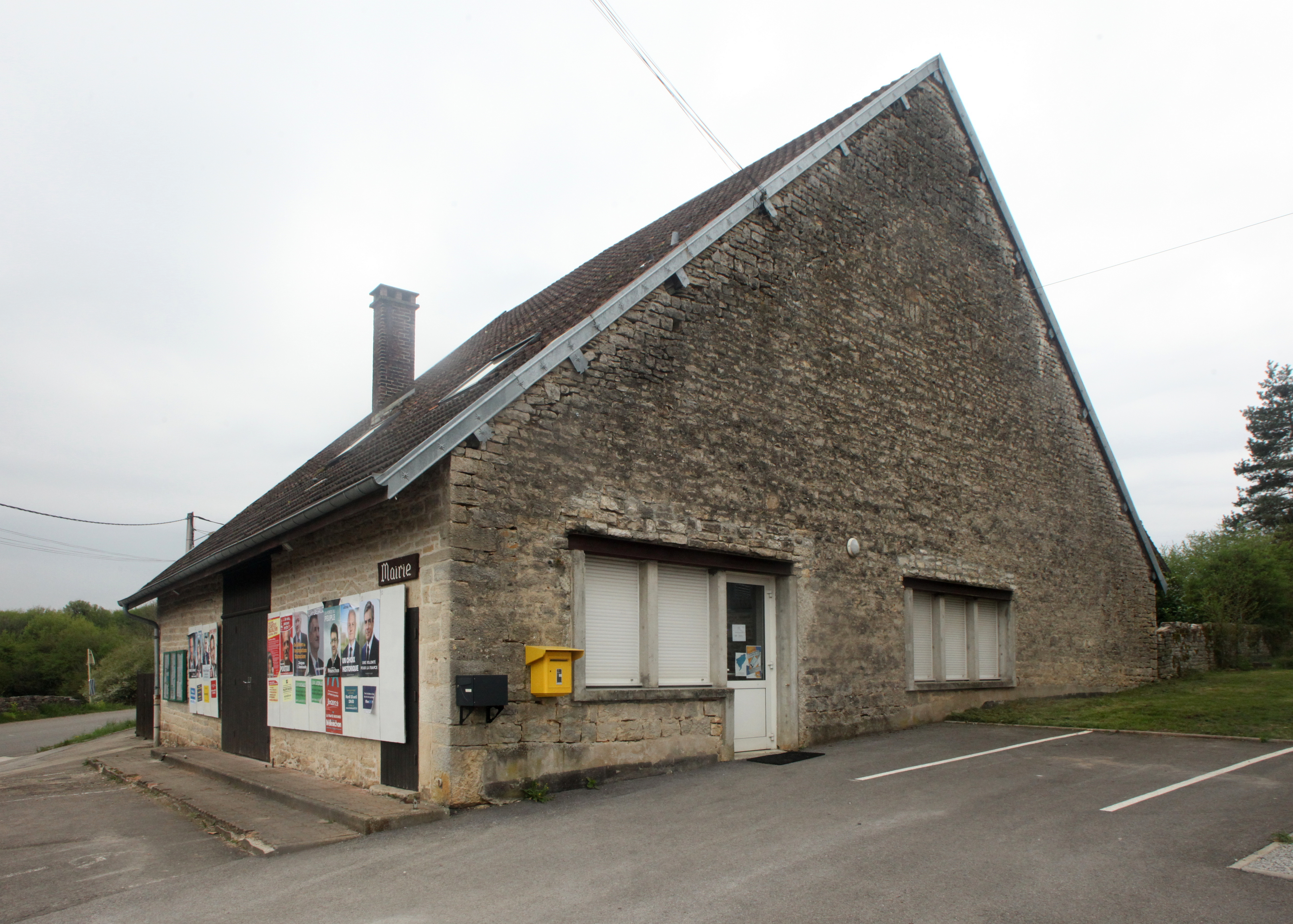
- The town hall in Charnay
- Location of Charnay
- Location within France Location within Bourgogne-Franche-Comté
- Coordinates: 47°07′42″N 5°57′21″E
- Country: France
- Region: Bourgogne-Franche-Comté
- Department: Doubs
- Arrondissement: Besançon
- Canton: Saint-Vit
- Intercommunality: Loue-Lison

Government
  - Mayor (2020–2026): Jean-Claude Stadelmann
- Area^{1}: 5.66 km^{2} (2.19 sq mi)
- Highest elevation: 484 m (1,588 ft)
- Lowest elevation: 273 m (896 ft)
- Population (2023): 467
  - Density: 82.5/km^{2} (214/sq mi)
- Time zone: UTC+01:00 (CET)
  - Summer (DST): UTC+02:00 (CEST)
- INSEE/Postal code: 25126 /25440
- ^{1} French Land Register data, which excludes lakes, ponds, glaciers > 1 km^{2} (0.386 sq mi or 247 acres) and river estuaries.

Charnay (French pronunciation: [ʃaʁnɛ]) is a commune in the Doubs department in the Bourgogne-Franche-Comté region in eastern France.

== Population ==
Historical population
Year	Pop.	±% p.a.
1968	85	—
1975	197	+12.76%
1982	381	+9.88%
1990	421	+1.26%
1999	429	+0.21%
2007	439	+0.29%
2012	471	+1.42%
2017	474	+0.13%
2023	467	−0.25%
Source: INSEE

== See also ==
- Communes of the Doubs department
