= Rouhe =

- Commune
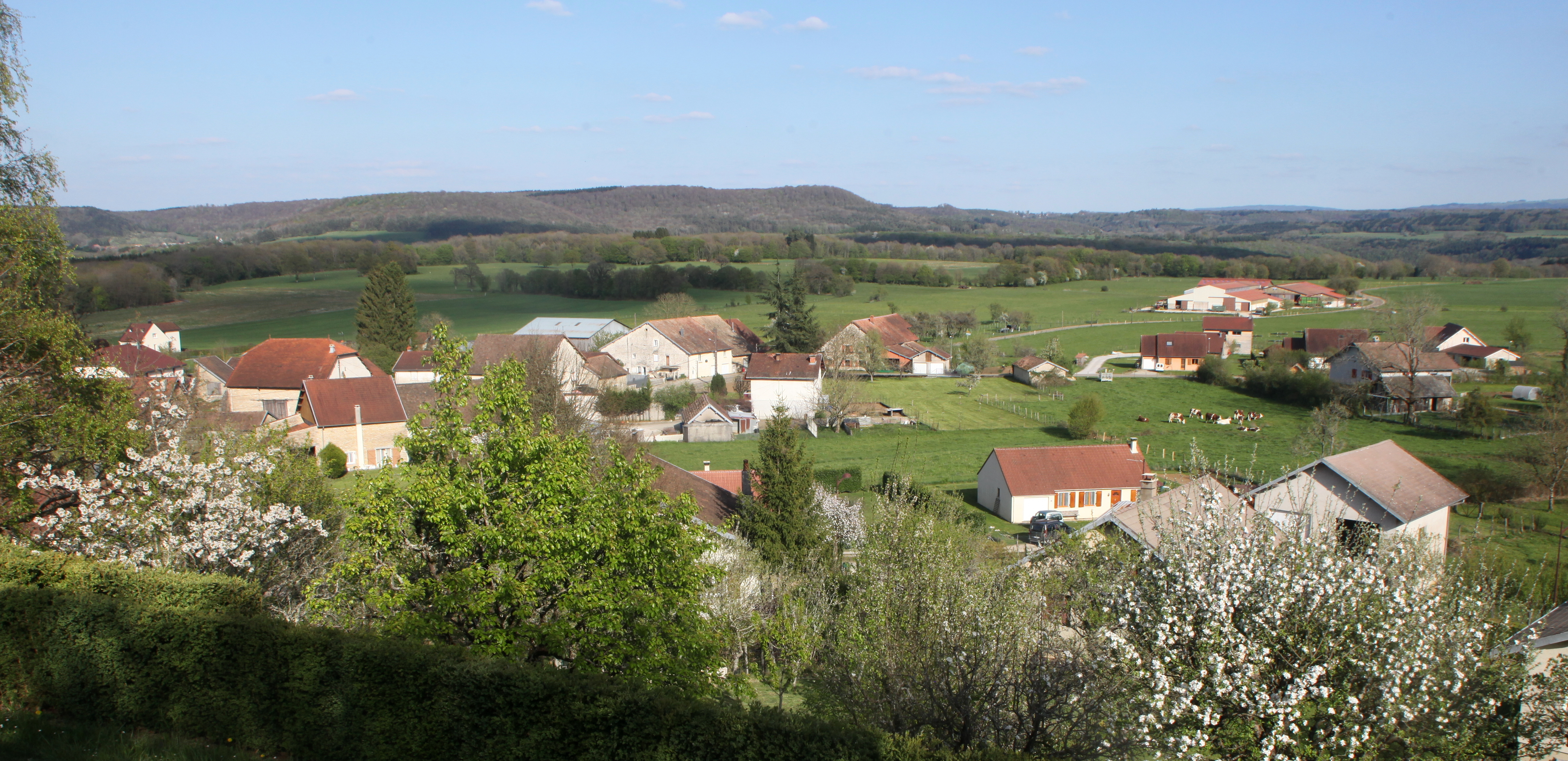
- A general view of Rouhe
- Location of Rouhe
- Location within France Location within Bourgogne-Franche-Comté
- Coordinates: 47°05′01″N 5°57′53″E
- Country: France
- Region: Bourgogne-Franche-Comté
- Department: Doubs
- Arrondissement: Besançon
- Canton: Saint-Vit
- Intercommunality: Loue-Lison

Government
  - Mayor (2020–2026): Marie-Christine Legain
- Area^{1}: 4.19 km^{2} (1.62 sq mi)
- Highest elevation: 472 m (1,549 ft)
- Lowest elevation: 285 m (935 ft)
- Population (2023): 87
  - Density: 21/km^{2} (54/sq mi)
- Time zone: UTC+01:00 (CET)
  - Summer (DST): UTC+02:00 (CEST)
- INSEE/Postal code: 25507 /25440
- ^{1} French Land Register data, which excludes lakes, ponds, glaciers > 1 km^{2} (0.386 sq mi or 247 acres) and river estuaries.

Rouhe is a commune in the Doubs department in the Bourgogne-Franche-Comté region in eastern France.

== Geography ==
Rouhe lies 25 km (16 mi) south of Besançon.

== Population ==
Historical population
Year	Pop.	±% p.a.
1968	62	—
1975	61	−0.23%
1982	58	−0.72%
1990	52	−1.36%
1999	73	+3.84%
2007	77	+0.67%
2012	87	+2.47%
2017	79	−1.91%
2023	87	+1.62%
Source: INSEE

== See also ==
- Communes of the Doubs department
