= Lombard, Doubs =

Lombard
- Commune
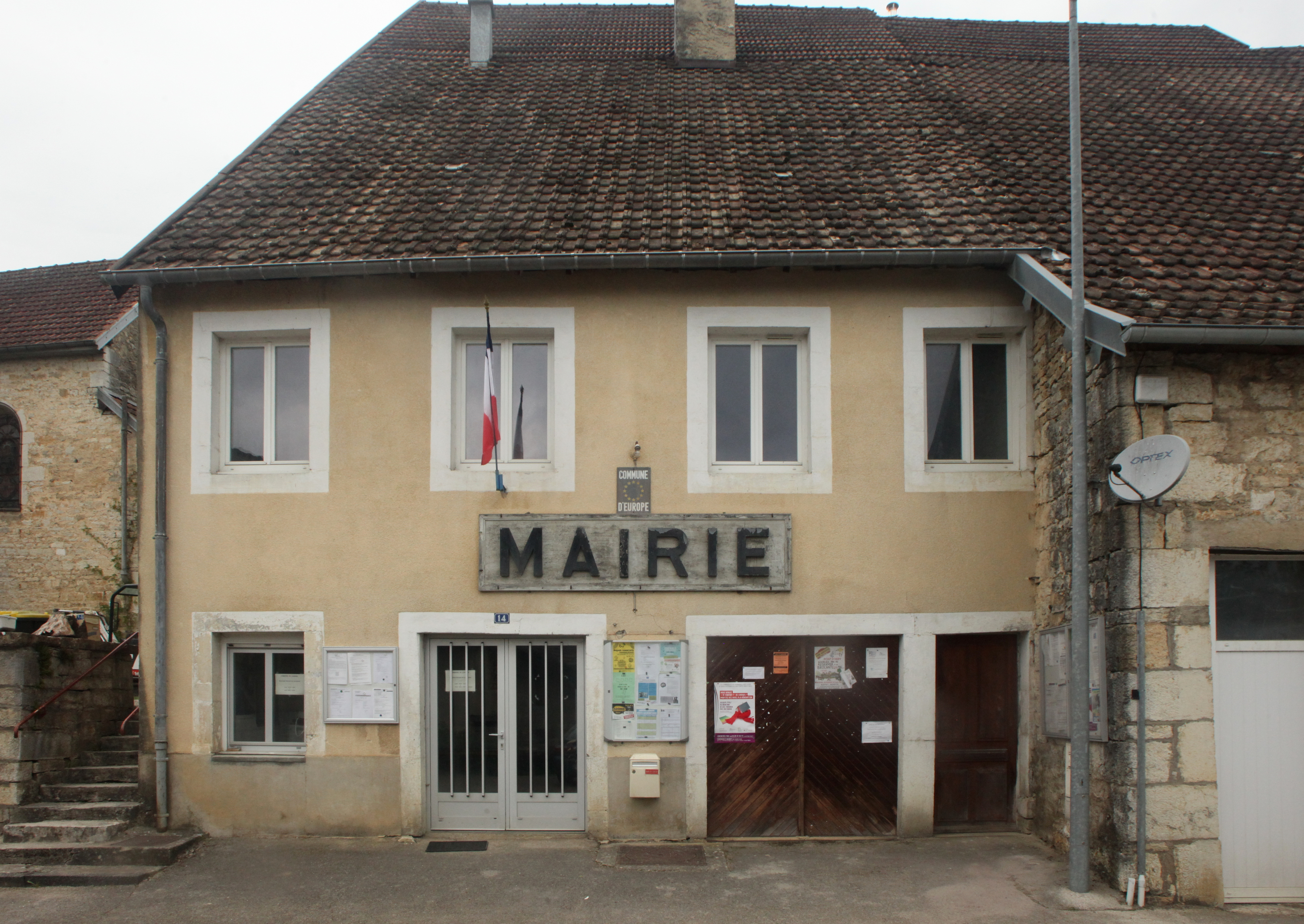
- The town hall in Lombard

- Coat of arms
- Location of Lombard
- Location within France Location within Bourgogne-Franche-Comté
- Coordinates: 47°04′41″N 5°51′15″E
- Country: France
- Region: Bourgogne-Franche-Comté
- Department: Doubs
- Arrondissement: Besançon
- Canton: Saint-Vit
- Intercommunality: Loue-Lison

Government
  - Mayor (2020–2026): Philippe Edme
- Area^{1}: 5.92 km^{2} (2.29 sq mi)
- Highest elevation: 493 m (1,617 ft)
- Lowest elevation: 252 m (827 ft)
- Population (2023): 195
  - Density: 32.9/km^{2} (85.3/sq mi)
- Time zone: UTC+01:00 (CET)
  - Summer (DST): UTC+02:00 (CEST)
- INSEE/Postal code: 25340 /25440
- ^{1} French Land Register data, which excludes lakes, ponds, glaciers > 1 km^{2} (0.386 sq mi or 247 acres) and river estuaries.

Lombard (French pronunciation: [lɔ̃baʁ]) is a commune in the Doubs department in the Bourgogne-Franche-Comté region in eastern France.

== Population ==
Historical population
Year	Pop.	±% p.a.
1968	145	—
1975	136	−0.91%
1982	146	+1.02%
1990	132	−1.25%
1999	153	+1.65%
2007	213	+4.22%
2012	216	+0.28%
2017	190	−2.53%
2023	195	+0.43%
Source: INSEE

== See also ==
- Communes of the Doubs department
