= Ruffey-le-Château =

- Commune
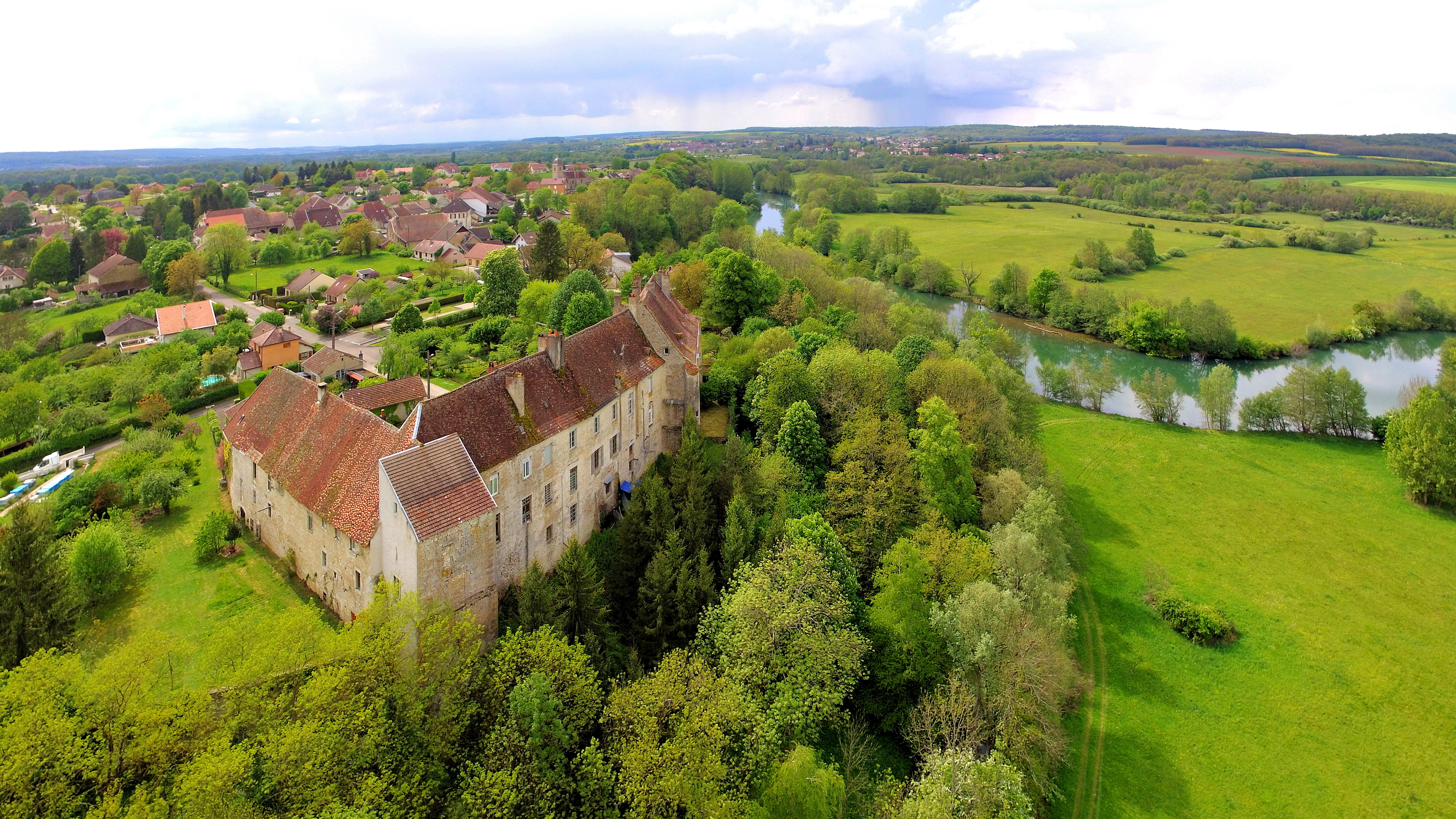
- The chateau on the bank of the Ognon river, in Ruffey-le-Château
- Location of Ruffey-le-Château
- Location within France Location within Bourgogne-Franche-Comté
- Coordinates: 47°17′18″N 5°47′57″E
- Country: France
- Region: Bourgogne-Franche-Comté
- Department: Doubs
- Arrondissement: Besançon
- Canton: Saint-Vit

Government
  - Mayor (2020–2026): Patricia Coquard
- Area^{1}: 7.25 km^{2} (2.80 sq mi)
- Highest elevation: 239 m (784 ft)
- Lowest elevation: 200 m (660 ft)
- Population (2023): 366
  - Density: 50.5/km^{2} (131/sq mi)
- Time zone: UTC+01:00 (CET)
  - Summer (DST): UTC+02:00 (CEST)
- INSEE/Postal code: 25510 /25170
- ^{1} French Land Register data, which excludes lakes, ponds, glaciers > 1 km^{2} (0.386 sq mi or 247 acres) and river estuaries.

Ruffey-le-Château (French pronunciation: [ʁyfɛ l(ə) ʃɑto]) is a commune in the Doubs department in the Bourgogne-Franche-Comté region in eastern France.

== Geography ==
The commune lies 20 km (12 mi) west of Besançon on the banks of the Ognon.

== Population ==
Historical population
Year	Pop.	±% p.a.
1968	84	—
1975	131	+6.55%
1982	163	+3.17%
1990	234	+4.62%
1999	275	+1.81%
2007	295	+0.88%
2012	324	+1.89%
2017	364	+2.36%
2023	366	+0.09%
Source: INSEE

== See also ==
- Communes of the Doubs department
