= Cessey =

- Commune
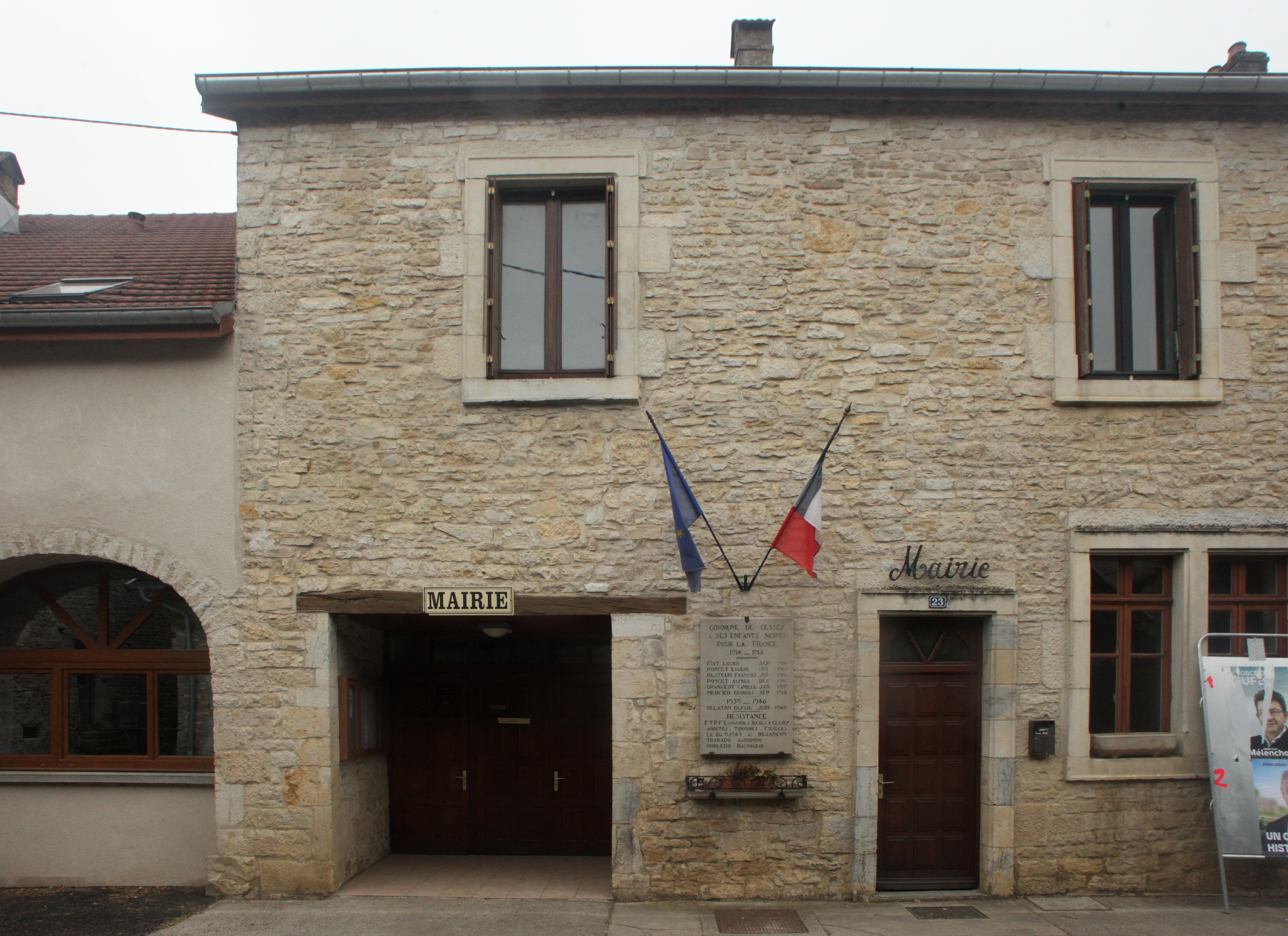
- The town hall in Cessey
- Location of Cessey
- Location within France Location within Bourgogne-Franche-Comté
- Coordinates: 47°06′34″N 5°54′54″E
- Country: France
- Region: Bourgogne-Franche-Comté
- Department: Doubs
- Arrondissement: Besançon
- Canton: Saint-Vit
- Intercommunality: Loue-Lison

Government
  - Mayor (2020–2026): Patrick Teles
- Area^{1}: 7.53 km^{2} (2.91 sq mi)
- Highest elevation: 534 m (1,752 ft)
- Lowest elevation: 263 m (863 ft)
- Population (2023): 326
  - Density: 43.3/km^{2} (112/sq mi)
- Time zone: UTC+01:00 (CET)
  - Summer (DST): UTC+02:00 (CEST)
- INSEE/Postal code: 25109 /25440
- ^{1} French Land Register data, which excludes lakes, ponds, glaciers > 1 km^{2} (0.386 sq mi or 247 acres) and river estuaries.

Cessey (French pronunciation: [sesɛ]) is a commune in the Doubs department in the Bourgogne-Franche-Comté region in eastern France.

== Population ==
Historical population
| Year | Pop. | ±% p.a. |
|---|---|---|
| 1968 | 62 | — |
| 1975 | 81 | +3.89% |
| 1982 | 175 | +11.63% |
| 1990 | 237 | +3.86% |
| 1999 | 288 | +2.19% |
| 2007 | 330 | +1.72% |
| 2012 | 345 | +0.89% |
| 2017 | 333 | −0.71% |
| 2023 | 326 | −0.35% |
Source: INSEE

== See also ==
- Communes of the Doubs department
