= Pessans =

- Commune
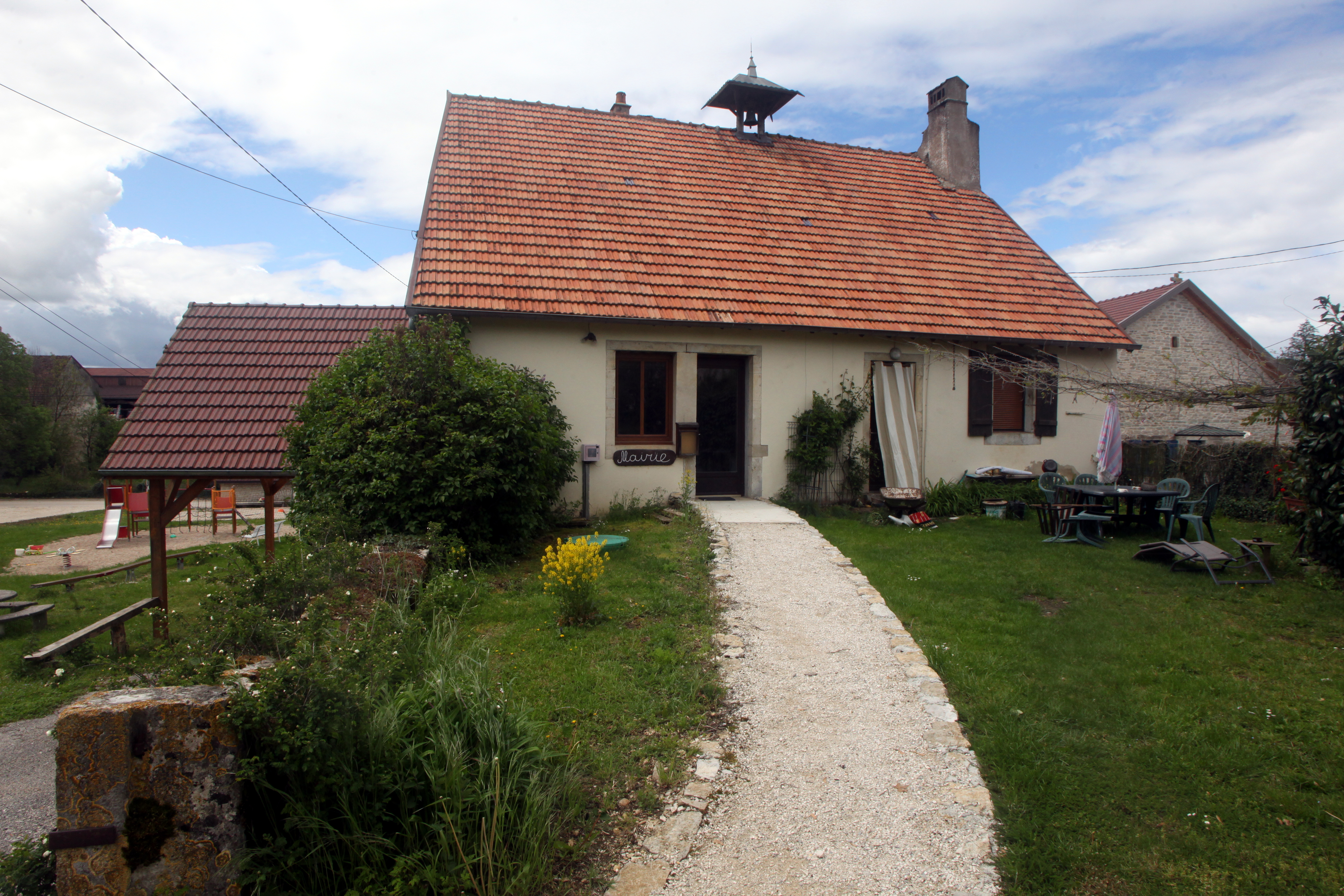
- The town hall in Pessans
- Location of Pessans
- Location within France Location within Bourgogne-Franche-Comté
- Coordinates: 47°04′15″N 5°52′59″E
- Country: France
- Region: Bourgogne-Franche-Comté
- Department: Doubs
- Arrondissement: Besançon
- Canton: Saint-Vit
- Intercommunality: Loue-Lison

Government
  - Mayor (2022–2026): Laetitia Rognon
- Area^{1}: 4.35 km^{2} (1.68 sq mi)
- Highest elevation: 555 m (1,821 ft)
- Lowest elevation: 255 m (837 ft)
- Population (2023): 89
  - Density: 20/km^{2} (53/sq mi)
- Time zone: UTC+01:00 (CET)
  - Summer (DST): UTC+02:00 (CEST)
- INSEE/Postal code: 25450 /25440
- ^{1} French Land Register data, which excludes lakes, ponds, glaciers > 1 km^{2} (0.386 sq mi or 247 acres) and river estuaries.

Pessans (French pronunciation: [pesɑ̃]) is a commune in the Doubs département in the Bourgogne-Franche-Comté region in eastern France.

== Population ==
Historical population
Year	Pop.	±% p.a.
1968	40	—
1975	33	−2.71%
1982	43	+3.85%
1990	51	+2.16%
1999	60	+1.82%
2007	72	+2.31%
2012	83	+2.88%
2017	87	+0.95%
2023	89	+0.38%
Source: INSEE

== See also ==
- Communes of the Doubs department
