= Corcelles-Ferrières =

- Commune
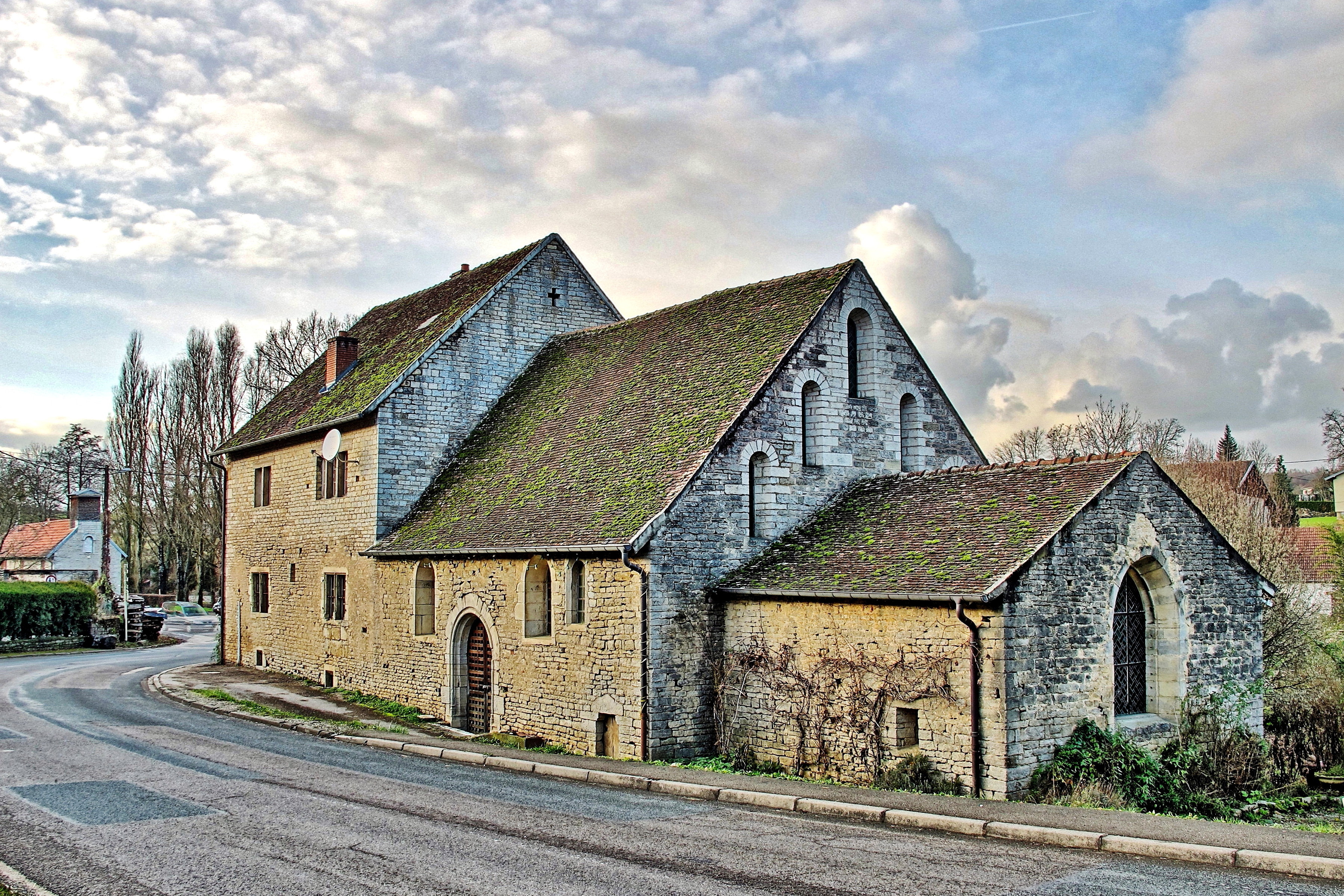
- The old abbey in Corcelles-Ferrières
- Location of Corcelles-Ferrières
- Location within France Location within Bourgogne-Franche-Comté
- Coordinates: 47°13′40″N 5°48′37″E
- Country: France
- Region: Bourgogne-Franche-Comté
- Department: Doubs
- Arrondissement: Besançon
- Canton: Saint-Vit

Government
  - Mayor (2020–2026): Florian Simon
- Area^{1}: 2.25 km^{2} (0.87 sq mi)
- Highest elevation: 270 m (890 ft)
- Lowest elevation: 217 m (712 ft)
- Population (2023): 214
  - Density: 95.1/km^{2} (246/sq mi)
- Time zone: UTC+01:00 (CET)
  - Summer (DST): UTC+02:00 (CEST)
- INSEE/Postal code: 25162 /25410
- ^{1} French Land Register data, which excludes lakes, ponds, glaciers > 1 km^{2} (0.386 sq mi or 247 acres) and river estuaries.

Corcelles-Ferrières (French pronunciation: [kɔʁsɛl fɛʁjɛʁ]) is a commune in the Doubs department in the Bourgogne-Franche-Comté region in eastern France.

== Population ==
Historical population
Year	Pop.	±% p.a.
1968	45	—
1975	56	+3.17%
1982	134	+13.27%
1990	156	+1.92%
1999	173	+1.16%
2007	191	+1.24%
2012	188	−0.32%
2017	200	+1.25%
2023	214	+1.13%
Source: INSEE

== See also ==
- Communes of the Doubs department
