= Épeugney =

- Commune
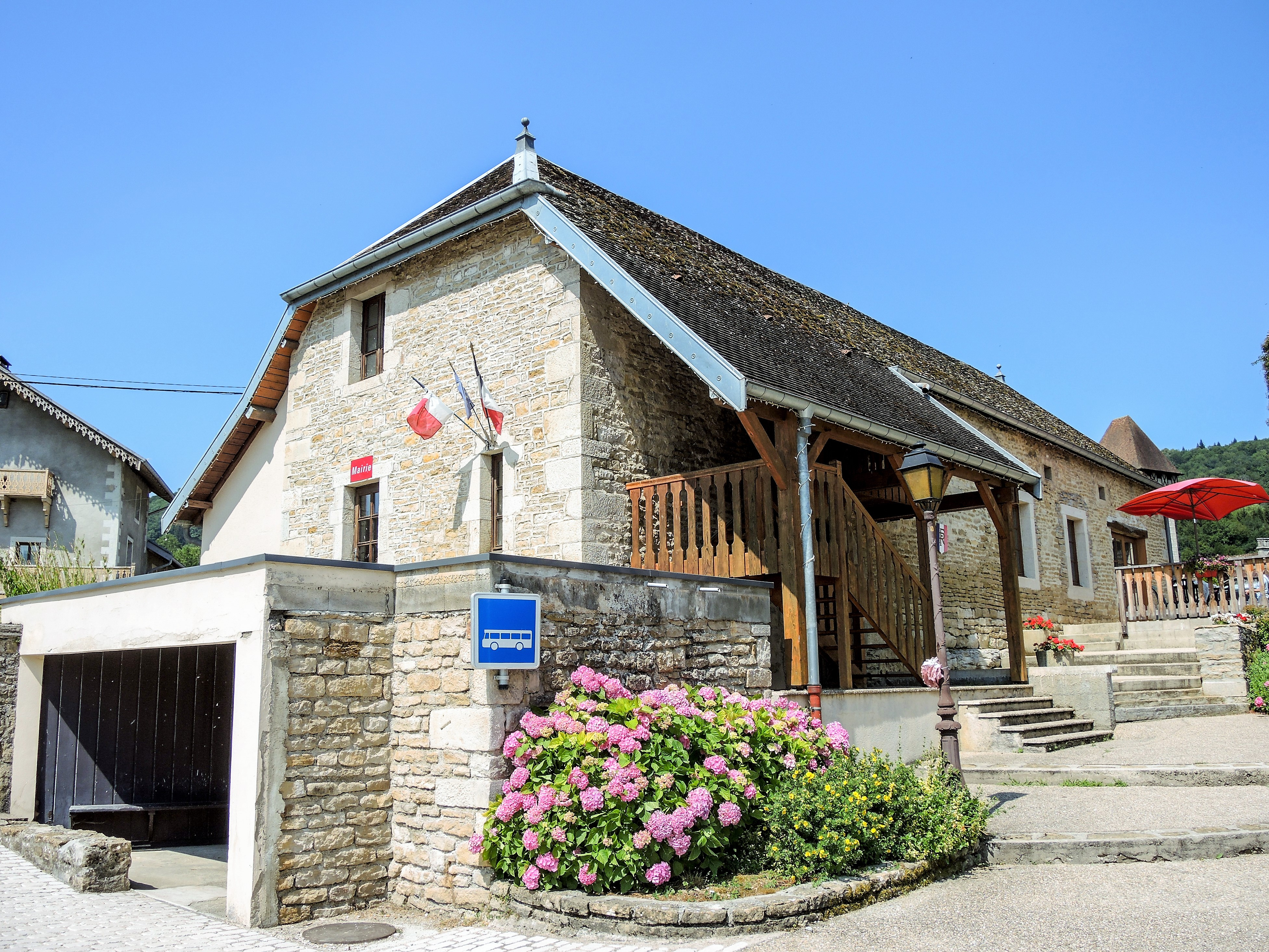
- The town hall in Épeugney

- Coat of arms
- Location of Épeugney
- Location within France Location within Bourgogne-Franche-Comté
- Coordinates: 47°07′06″N 6°01′31″E
- Country: France
- Region: Bourgogne-Franche-Comté
- Department: Doubs
- Arrondissement: Besançon
- Canton: Saint-Vit
- Intercommunality: Loue-Lison

Government
  - Mayor (2020–2026): Guillaume Aymonin
- Area^{1}: 13.95 km^{2} (5.39 sq mi)
- Elevation: 472 m (1,549 ft)
- Highest elevation: 525 m (1,722 ft)
- Lowest elevation: 387 m (1,270 ft)
- Population (2023): 590
  - Density: 42/km^{2} (110/sq mi)
- Time zone: UTC+01:00 (CET)
  - Summer (DST): UTC+02:00 (CEST)
- INSEE/Postal code: 25220 /25290
- ^{1} French Land Register data, which excludes lakes, ponds, glaciers > 1 km^{2} (0.386 sq mi or 247 acres) and river estuaries.

Épeugney (French pronunciation: [epøɲɛ]) is a commune in the Doubs department in the Bourgogne-Franche-Comté region in eastern France.

== Population ==
Historical population
Year	Pop.	±% p.a.
1968	228	—
1975	289	+3.44%
1982	346	+2.60%
1990	403	+1.92%
1999	456	+1.38%
2007	491	+0.93%
2012	555	+2.48%
2017	586	+1.09%
2023	590	+0.11%
Source: INSEE

== See also ==
- Communes of the Doubs department
