= Lavans-Quingey =

- Commune
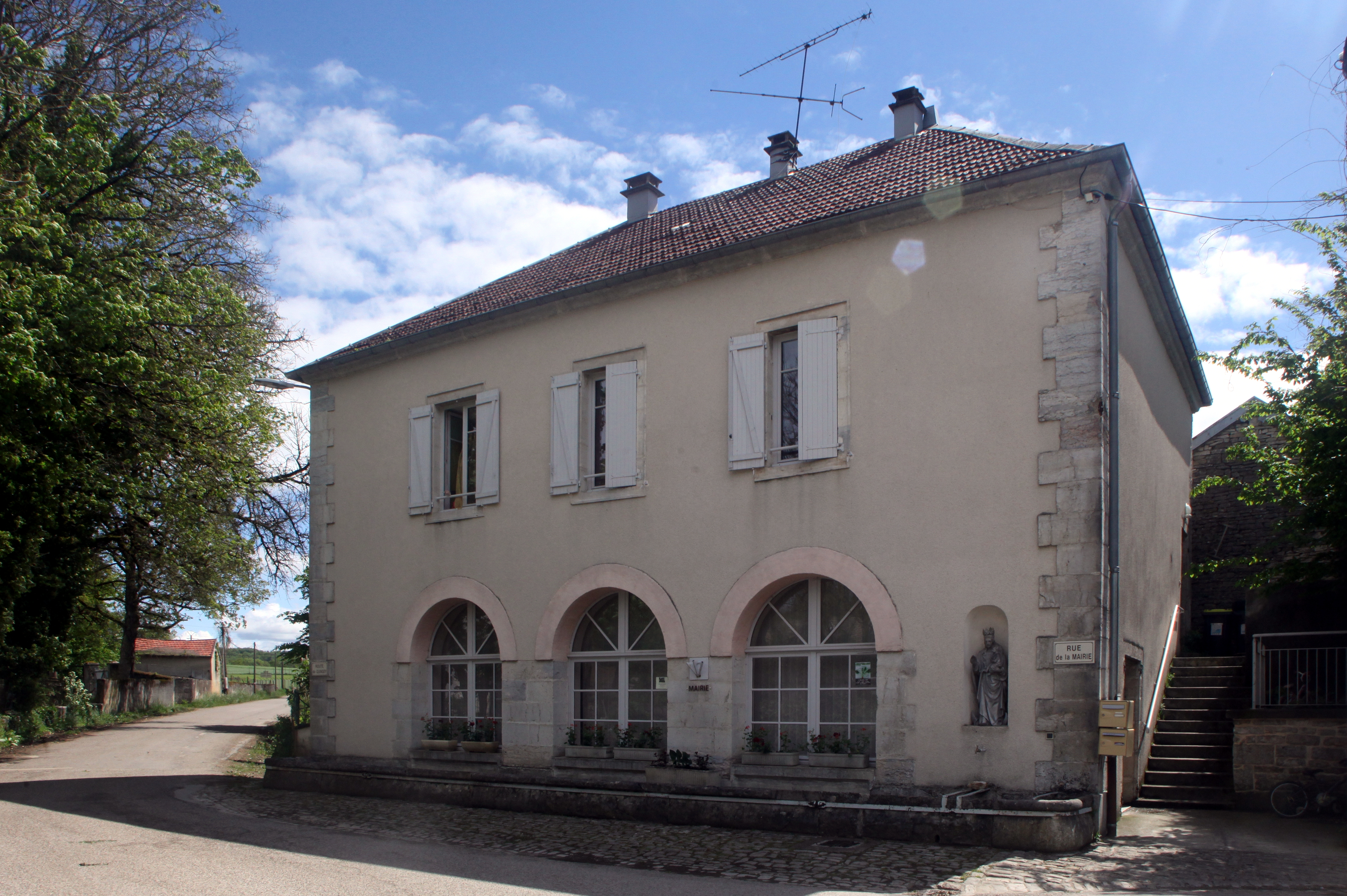
- The town hall in Lavans-Quingey
- Location of Lavans-Quingey
- Location within France Location within Bourgogne-Franche-Comté
- Coordinates: 47°05′23″N 5°52′39″E
- Country: France
- Region: Bourgogne-Franche-Comté
- Department: Doubs
- Arrondissement: Besançon
- Canton: Saint-Vit
- Intercommunality: Loue-Lison

Government
  - Mayor (2020–2026): Olivier Dard
- Area^{1}: 5.9 km^{2} (2.3 sq mi)
- Highest elevation: 521 m (1,709 ft)
- Lowest elevation: 258 m (846 ft)
- Population (2023): 188
  - Density: 32/km^{2} (83/sq mi)
- Time zone: UTC+01:00 (CET)
  - Summer (DST): UTC+02:00 (CEST)
- INSEE/Postal code: 25330 /25440
- ^{1} French Land Register data, which excludes lakes, ponds, glaciers > 1 km^{2} (0.386 sq mi or 247 acres) and river estuaries.

Lavans-Quingey (French pronunciation: [lavɑ̃ kɛ̃ʒɛ]) is a commune in the Doubs department in the Bourgogne-Franche-Comté region in eastern France.

== Population ==
Historical population
| Year | Pop. | ±% p.a. |
|---|---|---|
| 1968 | 92 | — |
| 1975 | 92 | +0.00% |
| 1982 | 98 | +0.91% |
| 1990 | 82 | −2.20% |
| 1999 | 112 | +3.52% |
| 2007 | 170 | +5.35% |
| 2012 | 200 | +3.30% |
| 2017 | 191 | −0.92% |
| 2023 | 188 | −0.26% |
Source: INSEE

== See also ==
- Communes of the Doubs department
