= Jallerange =

- Commune
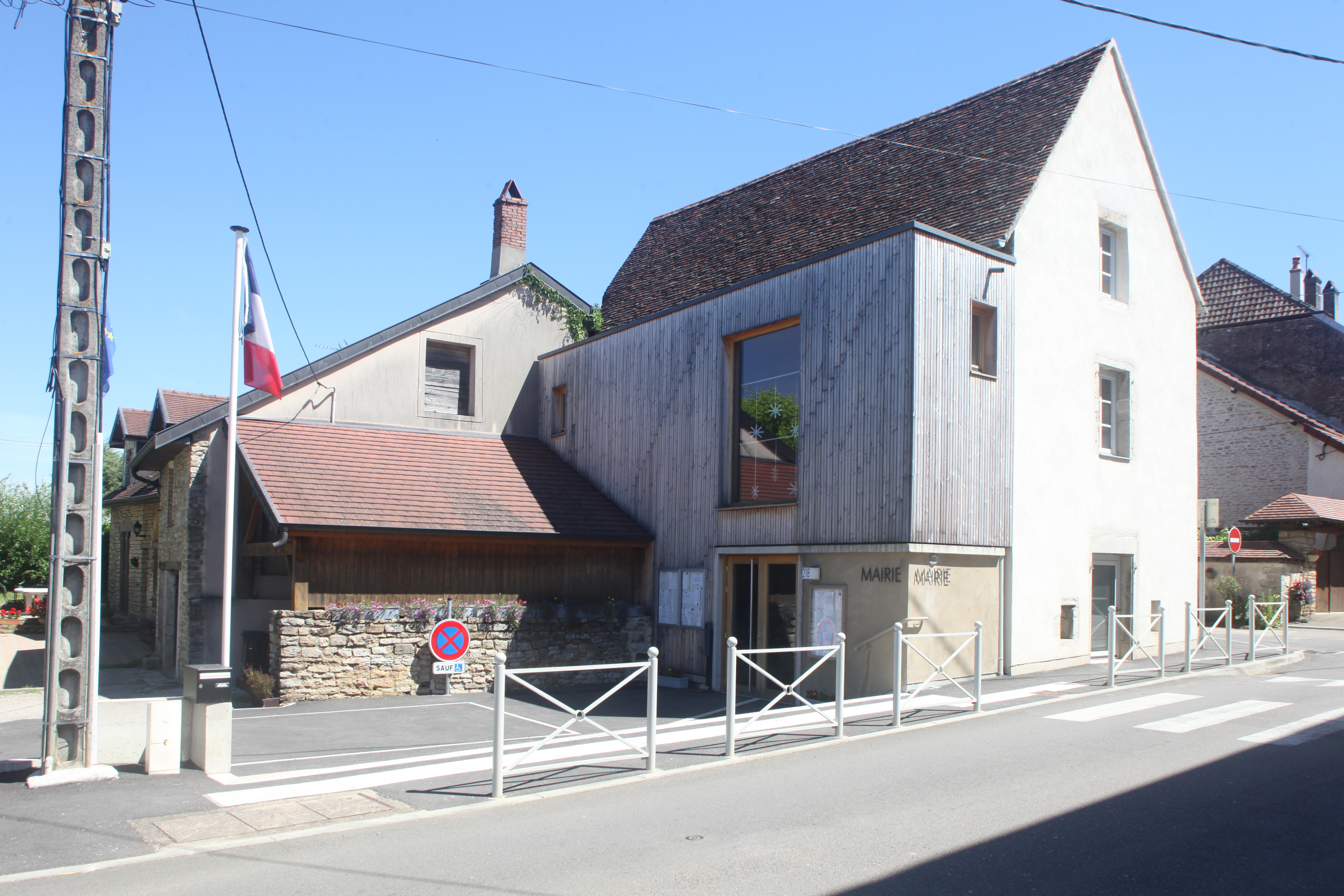
- The town hall in Jallerange

- Coat of arms
- Location of Jallerange
- Location within France Location within Bourgogne-Franche-Comté
- Coordinates: 47°15′18″N 5°43′03″E
- Country: France
- Region: Bourgogne-Franche-Comté
- Department: Doubs
- Arrondissement: Besançon
- Canton: Saint-Vit

Government
  - Mayor (2020–2026): Gilles Pinassaud
- Area^{1}: 5.41 km^{2} (2.09 sq mi)
- Highest elevation: 320 m (1,050 ft)
- Lowest elevation: 198 m (650 ft)
- Population (2023): 279
  - Density: 51.6/km^{2} (134/sq mi)
- Time zone: UTC+01:00 (CET)
  - Summer (DST): UTC+02:00 (CEST)
- INSEE/Postal code: 25317 /25170
- ^{1} French Land Register data, which excludes lakes, ponds, glaciers > 1 km^{2} (0.386 sq mi or 247 acres) and river estuaries.

Jallerange (French pronunciation: [ʒalʁɑ̃ʒ]) is a commune in the Doubs department in the Bourgogne-Franche-Comté region in eastern France.

== Geography ==
The commune is situated 26 km (16 mi) west of Besançon.

== History ==
An imposing Roman villa was discovered in 1771 by Claude Seguin, Seigneur de Jallerange. He created a magnificent garden designed by André Le Nôtre, which has been maintained in the same style for over 200 years.

== Population ==
Historical population
Year	Pop.	±% p.a.
1968	184	—
1975	170	−1.12%
1982	155	−1.31%
1990	145	−0.83%
1999	169	+1.72%
2007	210	+2.75%
2012	186	−2.40%
2017	260	+6.93%
2023	279	+1.18%
Source: INSEE

The inhabitants of the commune are called Joutereys in French.

== See also ==
- Communes of the Doubs department
