= Brères =

- Commune
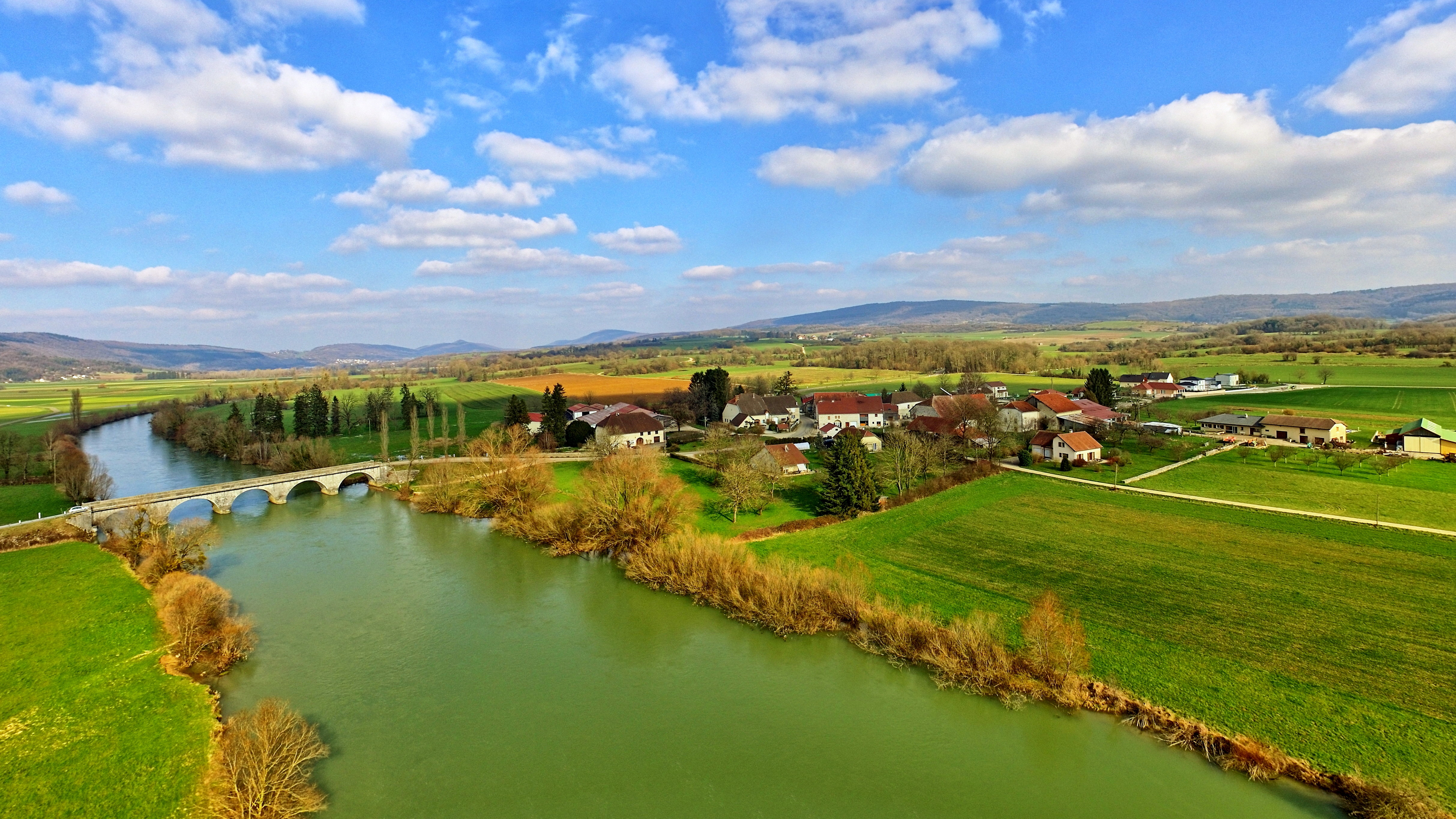
- A general view of Brères and the Loue river
- Location of Brères
- Location within France Location within Bourgogne-Franche-Comté
- Coordinates: 47°03′34″N 5°51′38″E
- Country: France
- Region: Bourgogne-Franche-Comté
- Department: Doubs
- Arrondissement: Besançon
- Canton: Saint-Vit
- Intercommunality: Loue-Lison

Government
  - Mayor (2020–2026): Henri Barbet
- Area^{1}: 2.15 km^{2} (0.83 sq mi)
- Highest elevation: 298 m (978 ft)
- Lowest elevation: 254 m (833 ft)
- Population (2023): 78
  - Density: 36/km^{2} (94/sq mi)
- Time zone: UTC+01:00 (CET)
  - Summer (DST): UTC+02:00 (CEST)
- INSEE/Postal code: 25090 /25440
- ^{1} French Land Register data, which excludes lakes, ponds, glaciers > 1 km^{2} (0.386 sq mi or 247 acres) and river estuaries.

Brères (French pronunciation: [bʁɛʁ]) is a commune in the Doubs department in the Bourgogne-Franche-Comté region in eastern France.

== Population ==
Historical population
Year	Pop.	±% p.a.
1968	32	—
1975	26	−2.92%
1982	24	−1.14%
1990	28	+1.95%
1999	35	+2.51%
2007	33	−0.73%
2012	47	+7.33%
2017	62	+5.70%
2023	78	+3.90%
Source: INSEE

== See also ==
- Communes of the Doubs department
