= Chay, Doubs =

Chay
- Commune
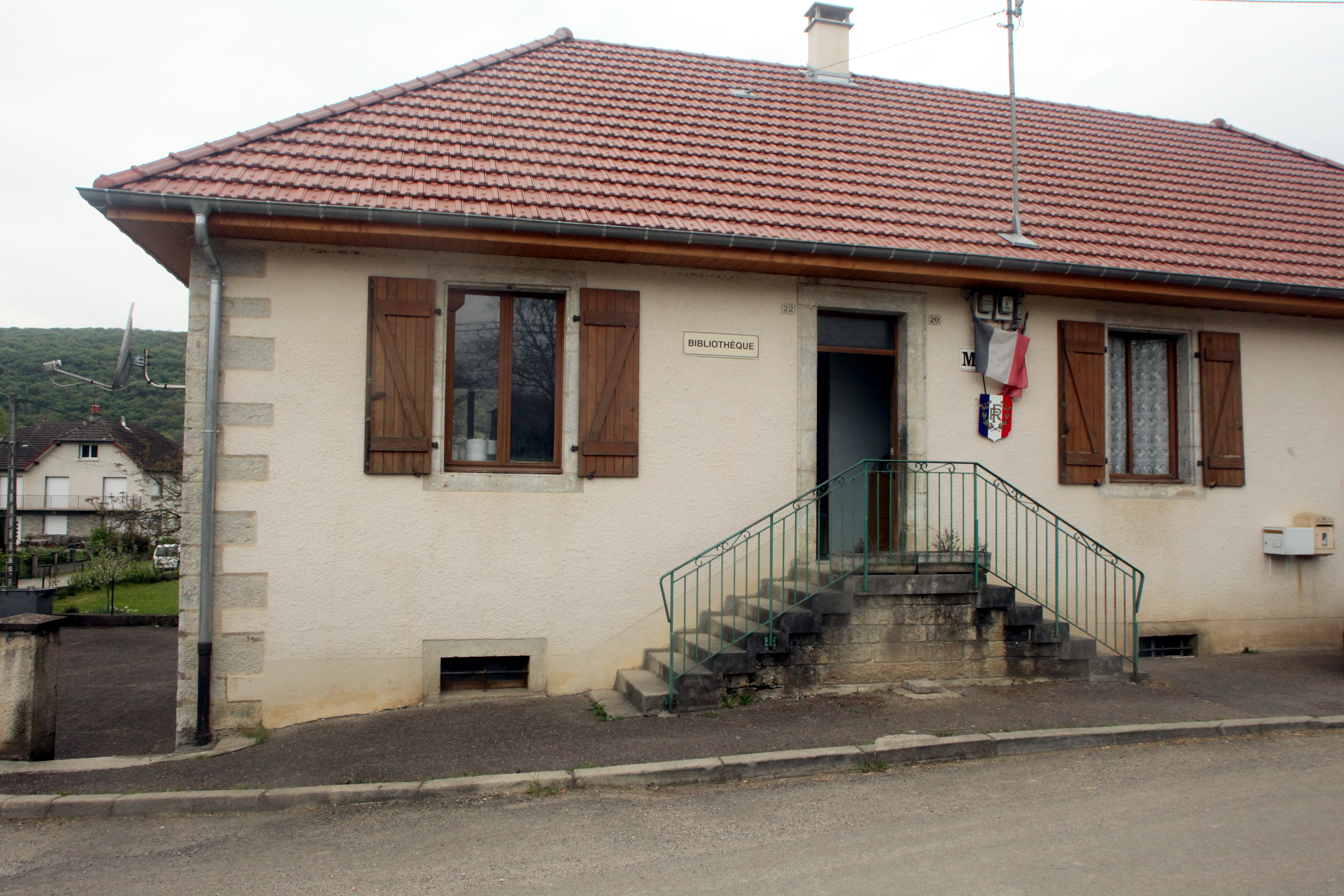
- The town hall in Chay
- Location of Chay
- Location within France Location within Bourgogne-Franche-Comté
- Coordinates: 47°02′08″N 5°51′42″E
- Country: France
- Region: Bourgogne-Franche-Comté
- Department: Doubs
- Arrondissement: Besançon
- Canton: Saint-Vit
- Intercommunality: Loue-Lison

Government
  - Mayor (2020–2026): Jean-Pierre Cunchon
- Area^{1}: 6.54 km^{2} (2.53 sq mi)
- Highest elevation: 502 m (1,647 ft)
- Lowest elevation: 245 m (804 ft)
- Population (2023): 194
  - Density: 29.7/km^{2} (76.8/sq mi)
- Time zone: UTC+01:00 (CET)
  - Summer (DST): UTC+02:00 (CEST)
- INSEE/Postal code: 25143 /25440
- ^{1} French Land Register data, which excludes lakes, ponds, glaciers > 1 km^{2} (0.386 sq mi or 247 acres) and river estuaries.

Chay (French pronunciation: [ʃaj]) is a commune in the Doubs department in the Bourgogne-Franche-Comté region in eastern France.

== Population ==
Historical population
Year	Pop.	±% p.a.
1968	117	—
1975	112	−0.62%
1982	126	+1.70%
1990	126	+0.00%
1999	141	+1.26%
2007	185	+3.45%
2012	200	+1.57%
2017	213	+1.27%
2023	194	−1.55%
Source: INSEE

== See also ==
- Communes of the Doubs department
