= Paroy, Doubs =

Paroy
- Commune
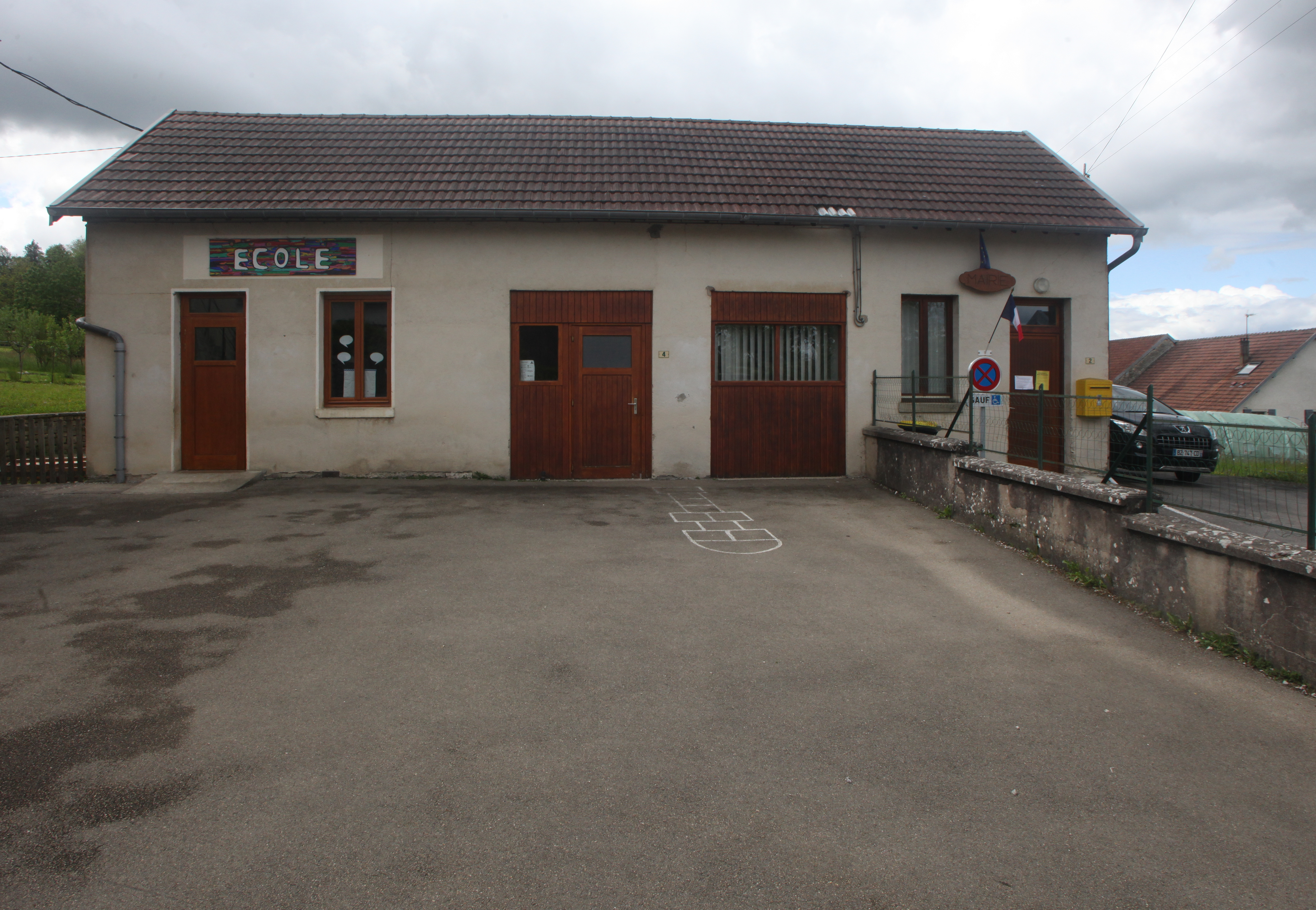
- The town hall and school in Paroy
- Location of Paroy
- Location within France Location within Bourgogne-Franche-Comté
- Coordinates: 47°02′38″N 5°52′56″E
- Country: France
- Region: Bourgogne-Franche-Comté
- Department: Doubs
- Arrondissement: Besançon
- Canton: Saint-Vit
- Intercommunality: Loue-Lison

Government
  - Mayor (2020–2026): Michel Chaussarot
- Area^{1}: 4.37 km^{2} (1.69 sq mi)
- Highest elevation: 572 m (1,877 ft)
- Lowest elevation: 276 m (906 ft)
- Population (2023): 116
  - Density: 26.5/km^{2} (68.8/sq mi)
- Time zone: UTC+01:00 (CET)
  - Summer (DST): UTC+02:00 (CEST)
- INSEE/Postal code: 25445 /25440
- ^{1} French Land Register data, which excludes lakes, ponds, glaciers > 1 km^{2} (0.386 sq mi or 247 acres) and river estuaries.

Paroy (French pronunciation: [paʁwa]) is a commune in the Doubs département in the Bourgogne-Franche-Comté region in eastern France.

== Population ==
Historical population
| Year | Pop. | ±% p.a. |
|---|---|---|
| 1968 | 80 | — |
| 1975 | 83 | +0.53% |
| 1982 | 93 | +1.64% |
| 1990 | 85 | −1.12% |
| 1999 | 96 | +1.36% |
| 2007 | 113 | +2.06% |
| 2012 | 120 | +1.21% |
| 2017 | 126 | +0.98% |
| 2023 | 116 | −1.37% |
Source: INSEE

== See also ==
- Communes of the Doubs department
