= Émagny =

- Commune
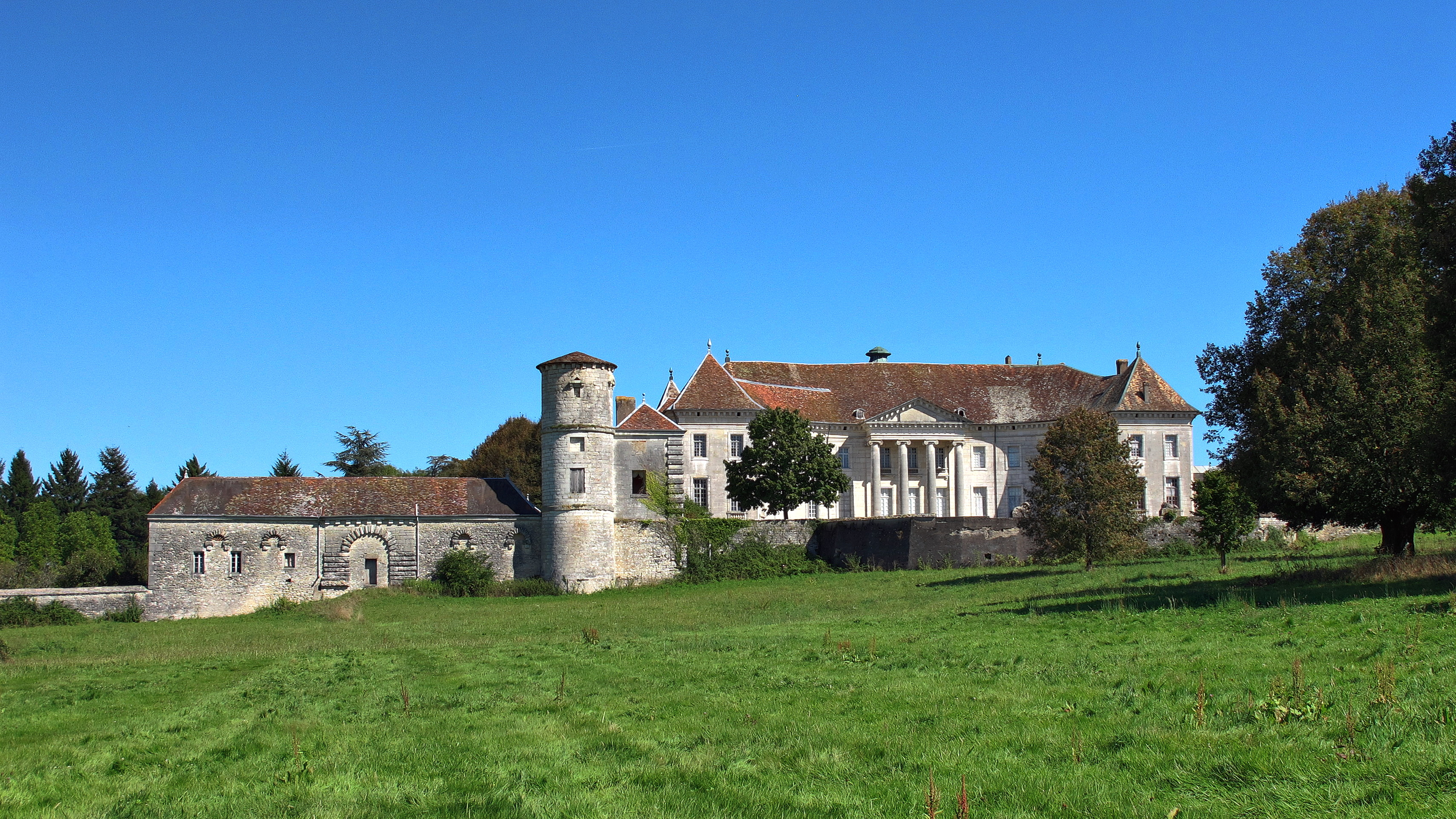
- Chateau of Moncley
- Location of Émagny
- Location within France Location within Bourgogne-Franche-Comté
- Coordinates: 47°18′43″N 5°52′12″E
- Country: France
- Region: Bourgogne-Franche-Comté
- Department: Doubs
- Arrondissement: Besançon
- Canton: Saint-Vit

Government
  - Mayor (2020–2026): Martial Dardelin
- Area^{1}: 5.15 km^{2} (1.99 sq mi)
- Elevation: 211 m (692 ft)
- Highest elevation: 248 m (814 ft)
- Lowest elevation: 202 m (663 ft)
- Population (2023): 629
  - Density: 122/km^{2} (316/sq mi)
- Time zone: UTC+01:00 (CET)
  - Summer (DST): UTC+02:00 (CEST)
- INSEE/Postal code: 25217 /25170
- ^{1} French Land Register data, which excludes lakes, ponds, glaciers > 1 km^{2} (0.386 sq mi or 247 acres) and river estuaries.

Émagny (French pronunciation: [emaɲi]) is a commune in the Doubs department in the Bourgogne-Franche-Comté region in eastern France.

== Population ==
Historical population
Year	Pop.	±% p.a.
1968	419	—
1975	411	−0.28%
1982	456	+1.50%
1990	511	+1.43%
1999	563	+1.08%
2007	605	+0.90%
2012	600	−0.17%
2017	594	−0.20%
2023	629	+0.96%
Source: INSEE

== See also ==
- Communes of the Doubs department
