= Battenans-les-Mines =

- Commune
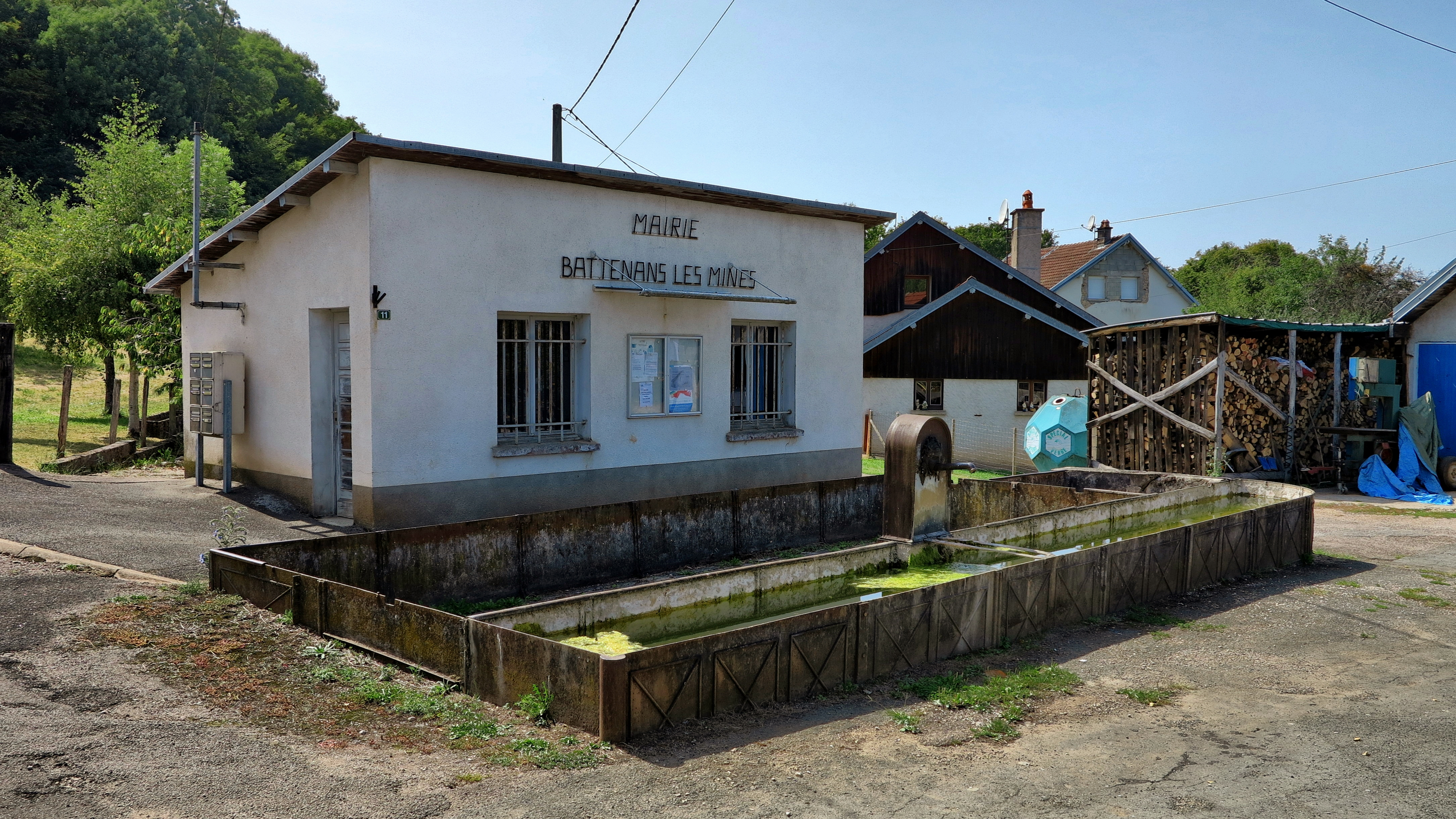
- The town hall in Battenans-les-Mines
- Location of Battenans-les-Mines
- Location within France Location within Bourgogne-Franche-Comté
- Coordinates: 47°24′38″N 6°16′09″E
- Country: France
- Region: Bourgogne-Franche-Comté
- Department: Doubs
- Arrondissement: Besançon
- Canton: Baume-les-Dames

Government
  - Mayor (2020–2026): Henri Petite
- Area^{1}: 2.78 km^{2} (1.07 sq mi)
- Highest elevation: 404 m (1,325 ft)
- Lowest elevation: 256 m (840 ft)
- Population (2023): 38
  - Density: 14/km^{2} (35/sq mi)
- Time zone: UTC+01:00 (CET)
  - Summer (DST): UTC+02:00 (CEST)
- INSEE/Postal code: 25045 /25640
- ^{1} French Land Register data, which excludes lakes, ponds, glaciers > 1 km^{2} (0.386 sq mi or 247 acres) and river estuaries.

Battenans-les-Mines (French pronunciation: [batnɑ̃ le min]) is a commune in the Doubs department in the Bourgogne-Franche-Comté region in eastern France.

== Population ==
Historical population
Year	Pop.	±% p.a.
1968	50	—
1975	41	−2.80%
1982	50	+2.88%
1990	48	−0.51%
1999	57	+1.93%
2007	55	−0.45%
2012	59	+1.41%
2017	54	−1.76%
2023	38	−5.69%
Source: INSEE

== See also ==
- Communes of the Doubs department
