= Voillans =

- Commune
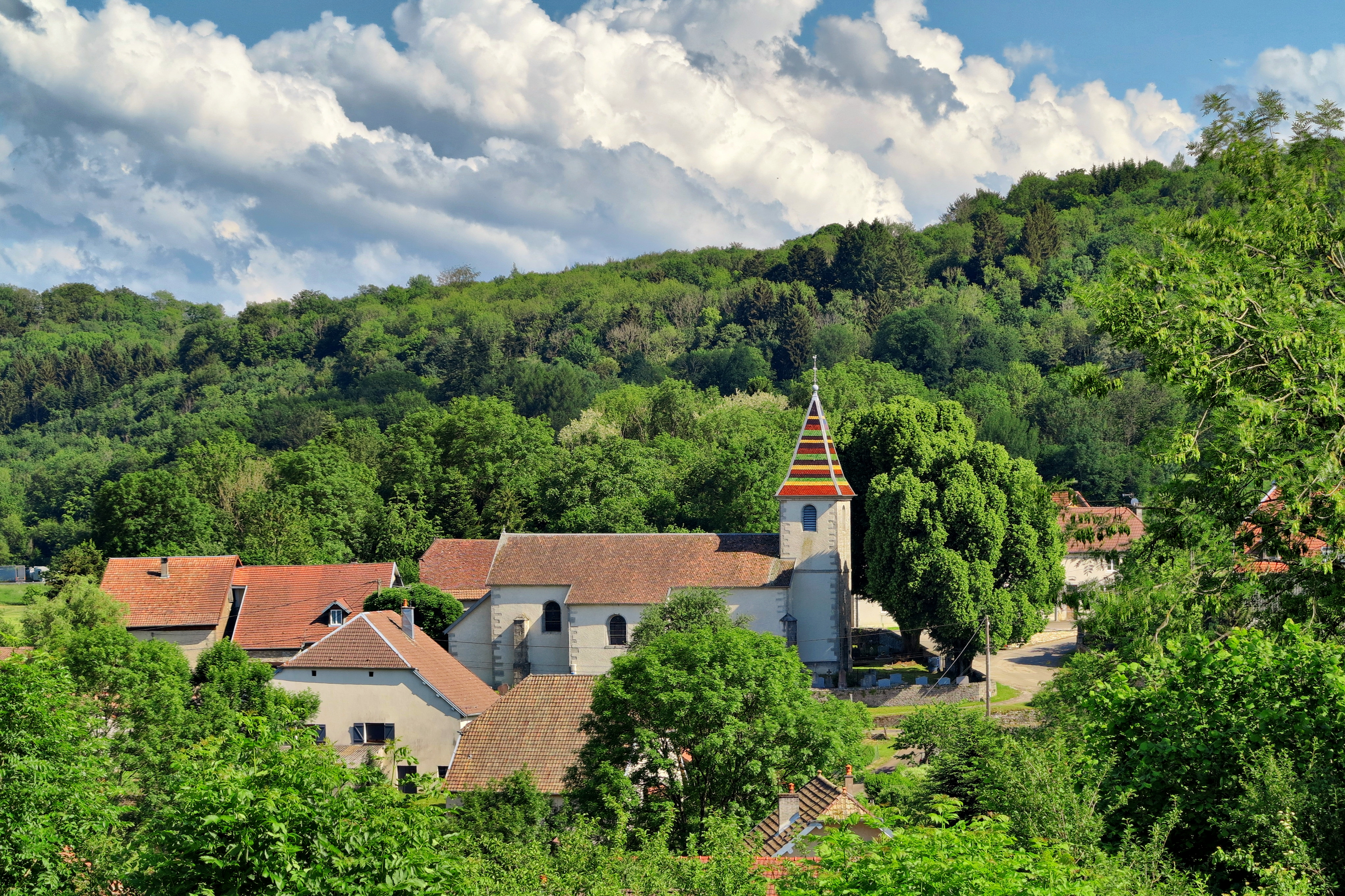
- The church in Voillans

- Coat of arms
- Location of Voillans
- Location within France Location within Bourgogne-Franche-Comté
- Coordinates: 47°23′14″N 6°24′50″E
- Country: France
- Region: Bourgogne-Franche-Comté
- Department: Doubs
- Arrondissement: Besançon
- Canton: Baume-les-Dames
- Intercommunality: Doubs Baumois

Government
  - Mayor (2020–2026): Simon Guillaume
- Area^{1}: 10.12 km^{2} (3.91 sq mi)
- Highest elevation: 548 m (1,798 ft)
- Lowest elevation: 382 m (1,253 ft)
- Population (2023): 193
  - Density: 19.1/km^{2} (49.4/sq mi)
- Time zone: UTC+01:00 (CET)
  - Summer (DST): UTC+02:00 (CEST)
- INSEE/Postal code: 25629 /25110
- ^{1} French Land Register data, which excludes lakes, ponds, glaciers > 1 km^{2} (0.386 sq mi or 247 acres) and river estuaries.

Voillans (French pronunciation: [vwalɑ̃]) is a commune in the Doubs department in the Bourgogne-Franche-Comté region in eastern France.

== Population ==
Historical population
Year	Pop.	±% p.a.
1968	106	—
1975	96	−1.41%
1982	115	+2.61%
1990	141	+2.58%
1999	199	+3.90%
2007	210	+0.67%
2012	207	−0.29%
2017	208	+0.10%
2023	193	−1.24%
Source: INSEE

== See also ==
- Communes of the Doubs department
