= Pont-les-Moulins =

- Commune
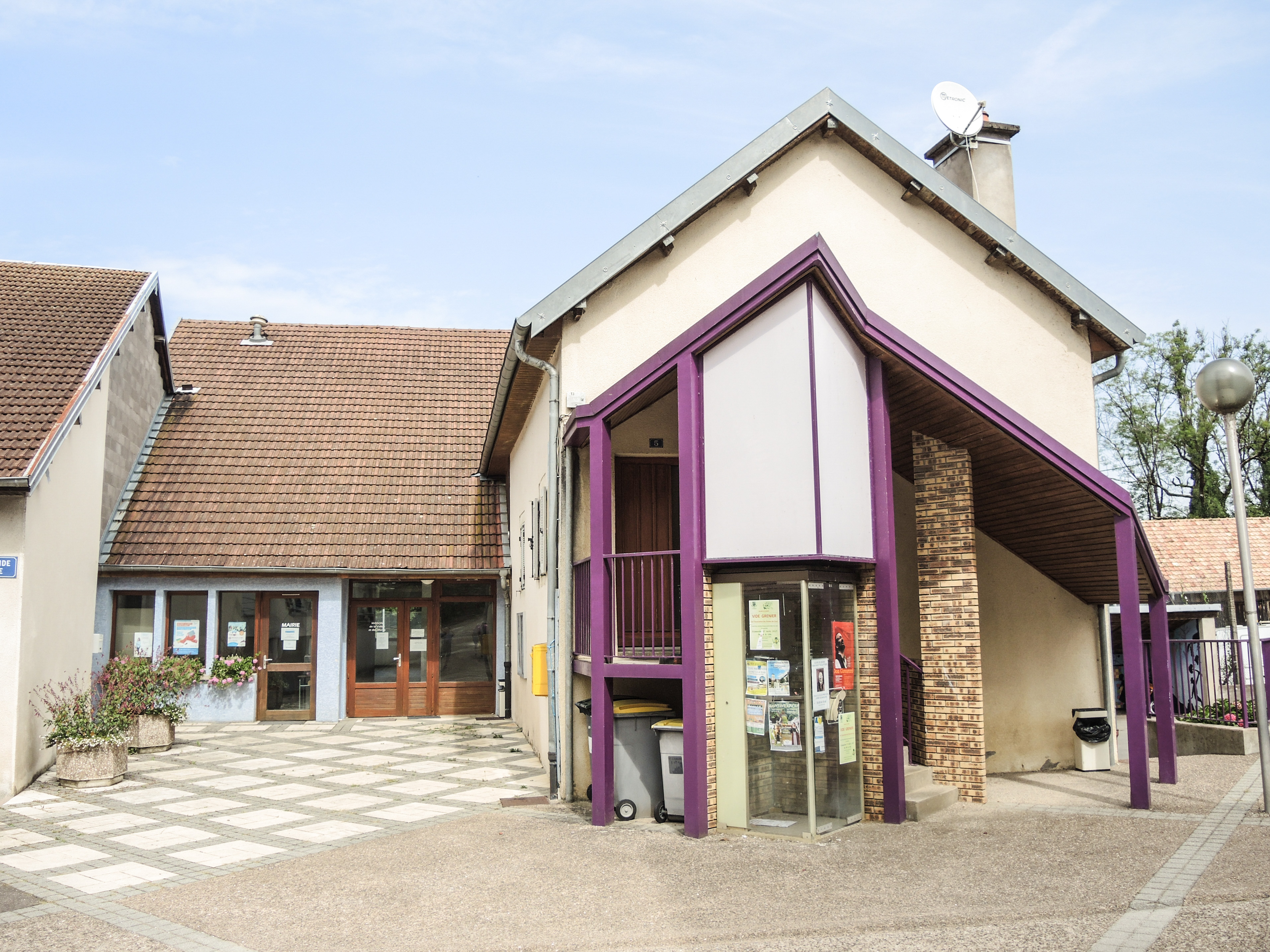
- The town hall in Pont-les-Moulins
- Location of Pont-les-Moulins
- Location within France Location within Bourgogne-Franche-Comté
- Coordinates: 47°19′28″N 6°21′52″E
- Country: France
- Region: Bourgogne-Franche-Comté
- Department: Doubs
- Arrondissement: Besançon
- Canton: Baume-les-Dames

Government
  - Mayor (2020–2026): Alexandre Perrez-Bonnet
- Area^{1}: 4.95 km^{2} (1.91 sq mi)
- Highest elevation: 426 m (1,398 ft)
- Lowest elevation: 269 m (883 ft)
- Population (2023): 208
  - Density: 42.0/km^{2} (109/sq mi)
- Time zone: UTC+01:00 (CET)
  - Summer (DST): UTC+02:00 (CEST)
- INSEE/Postal code: 25465 /25110
- ^{1} French Land Register data, which excludes lakes, ponds, glaciers > 1 km^{2} (0.386 sq mi or 247 acres) and river estuaries.

Pont-les-Moulins (French pronunciation: [pɔ̃ le mulɛ̃]) is a commune in the Doubs department in the Bourgogne-Franche-Comté region in eastern France.

== Population ==
Historical population
Year	Pop.	±% p.a.
1968	140	—
1975	132	−0.84%
1982	164	+3.15%
1990	170	+0.45%
1999	170	+0.00%
2007	174	+0.29%
2012	175	+0.11%
2017	195	+2.19%
2023	208	+1.08%
Source: INSEE

== See also ==
- Communes of the Doubs department
