= Gonsans =

- Commune
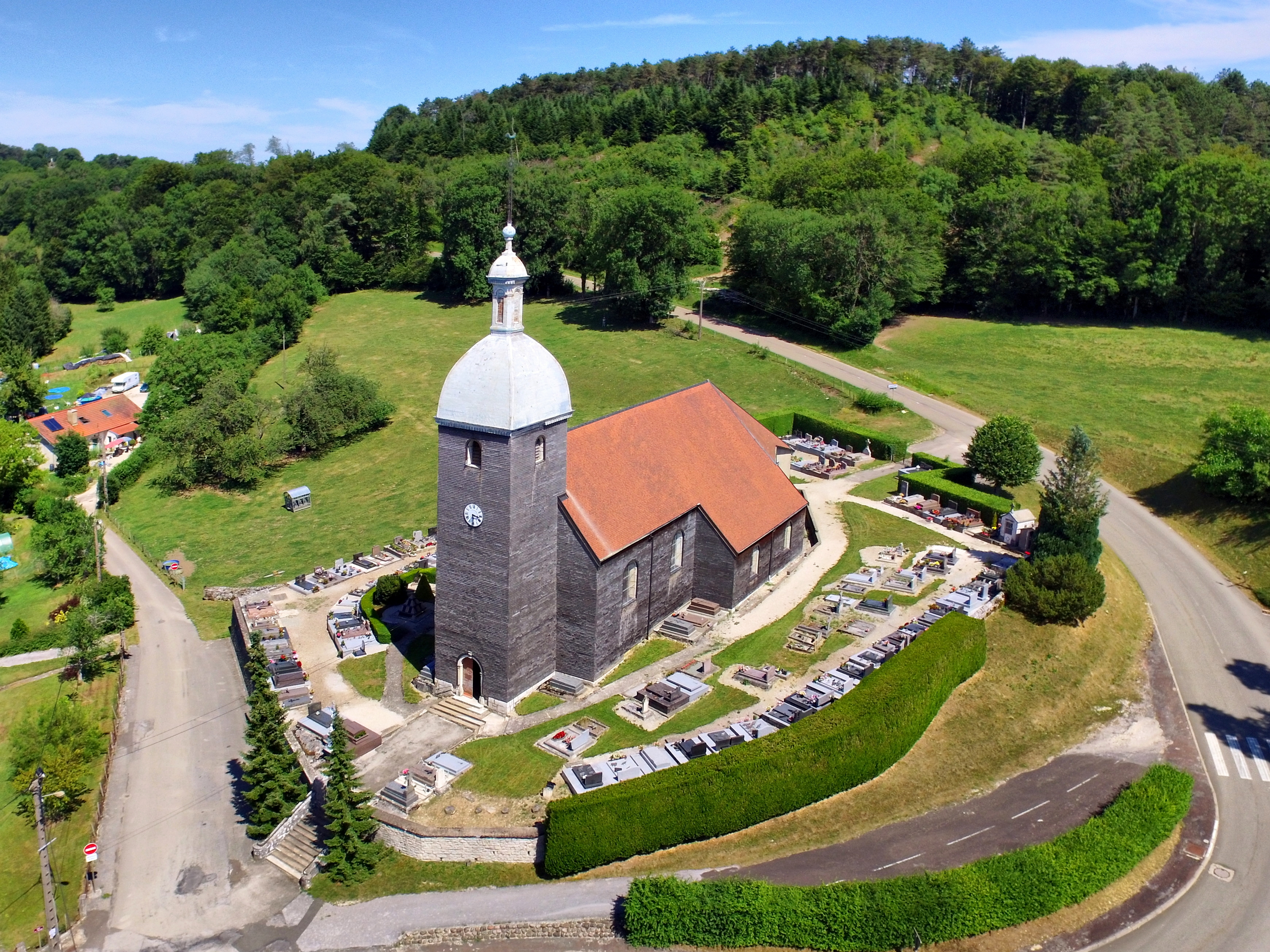
- The church in Gonsans

- Coat of arms
- Location of Gonsans
- Location within France Location within Bourgogne-Franche-Comté
- Coordinates: 47°13′58″N 6°18′04″E
- Country: France
- Region: Bourgogne-Franche-Comté
- Department: Doubs
- Arrondissement: Besançon
- Canton: Baume-les-Dames

Government
  - Mayor (2020–2026): Samuel Girardet
- Area^{1}: 17.29 km^{2} (6.68 sq mi)
- Highest elevation: 644 m (2,113 ft)
- Lowest elevation: 447 m (1,467 ft)
- Population (2023): 554
  - Density: 32.0/km^{2} (83.0/sq mi)
- Time zone: UTC+01:00 (CET)
  - Summer (DST): UTC+02:00 (CEST)
- INSEE/Postal code: 25278 /25360
- ^{1} French Land Register data, which excludes lakes, ponds, glaciers > 1 km^{2} (0.386 sq mi or 247 acres) and river estuaries.

Gonsans (French pronunciation: [ɡɔ̃sɑ̃]) is a commune in the Doubs department in the Bourgogne-Franche-Comté region in eastern France.

== Population ==
Historical population
| Year | Pop. | ±% p.a. |
|---|---|---|
| 1968 | 243 | — |
| 1975 | 272 | +1.62% |
| 1982 | 351 | +3.71% |
| 1990 | 375 | +0.83% |
| 1999 | 433 | +1.61% |
| 2007 | 504 | +1.92% |
| 2012 | 545 | +1.58% |
| 2017 | 567 | +0.79% |
| 2023 | 554 | −0.39% |
Source: INSEE

== See also ==
- Communes of the Doubs department
