= Avilley =

- Commune
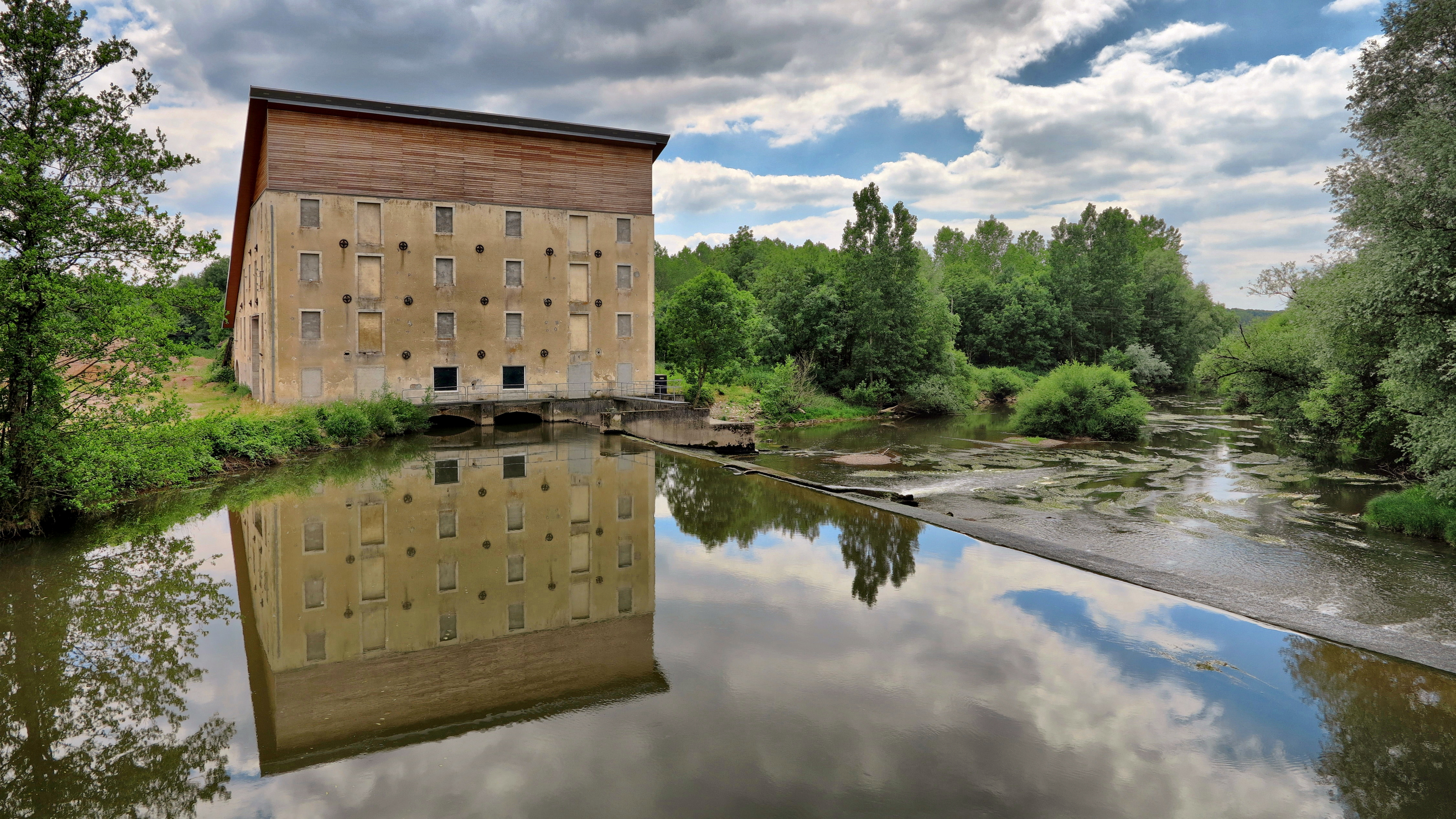
- The mill and weir on the Ognon river

- Coat of arms
- Location of Avilley
- Location within France Location within Bourgogne-Franche-Comté
- Coordinates: 47°25′36″N 6°16′05″E
- Country: France
- Region: Bourgogne-Franche-Comté
- Department: Doubs
- Arrondissement: Besançon
- Canton: Baume-les-Dames
- Intercommunality: CC Deux Vallées Vertes

Government
  - Mayor (2020–2026): Phillipe Januel
- Area^{1}: 5.62 km^{2} (2.17 sq mi)
- Highest elevation: 295 m (968 ft)
- Lowest elevation: 236 m (774 ft)
- Population (2023): 150
  - Density: 27/km^{2} (69/sq mi)
- Time zone: UTC+01:00 (CET)
  - Summer (DST): UTC+02:00 (CEST)
- INSEE/Postal code: 25038 /25680
- ^{1} French Land Register data, which excludes lakes, ponds, glaciers > 1 km^{2} (0.386 sq mi or 247 acres) and river estuaries.

Avilley is a commune in the Doubs department in the Bourgogne-Franche-Comté region in eastern France.

== Population ==
Historical population
Year	Pop.	±% p.a.
1968	165	—
1975	134	−2.93%
1982	139	+0.52%
1990	114	−2.45%
1999	135	+1.90%
2007	170	+2.92%
2012	170	+0.00%
2017	163	−0.84%
2023	150	−1.38%
Source: INSEE

== See also ==
- Communes of the Doubs department
