= Val-de-Roulans =

- Commune
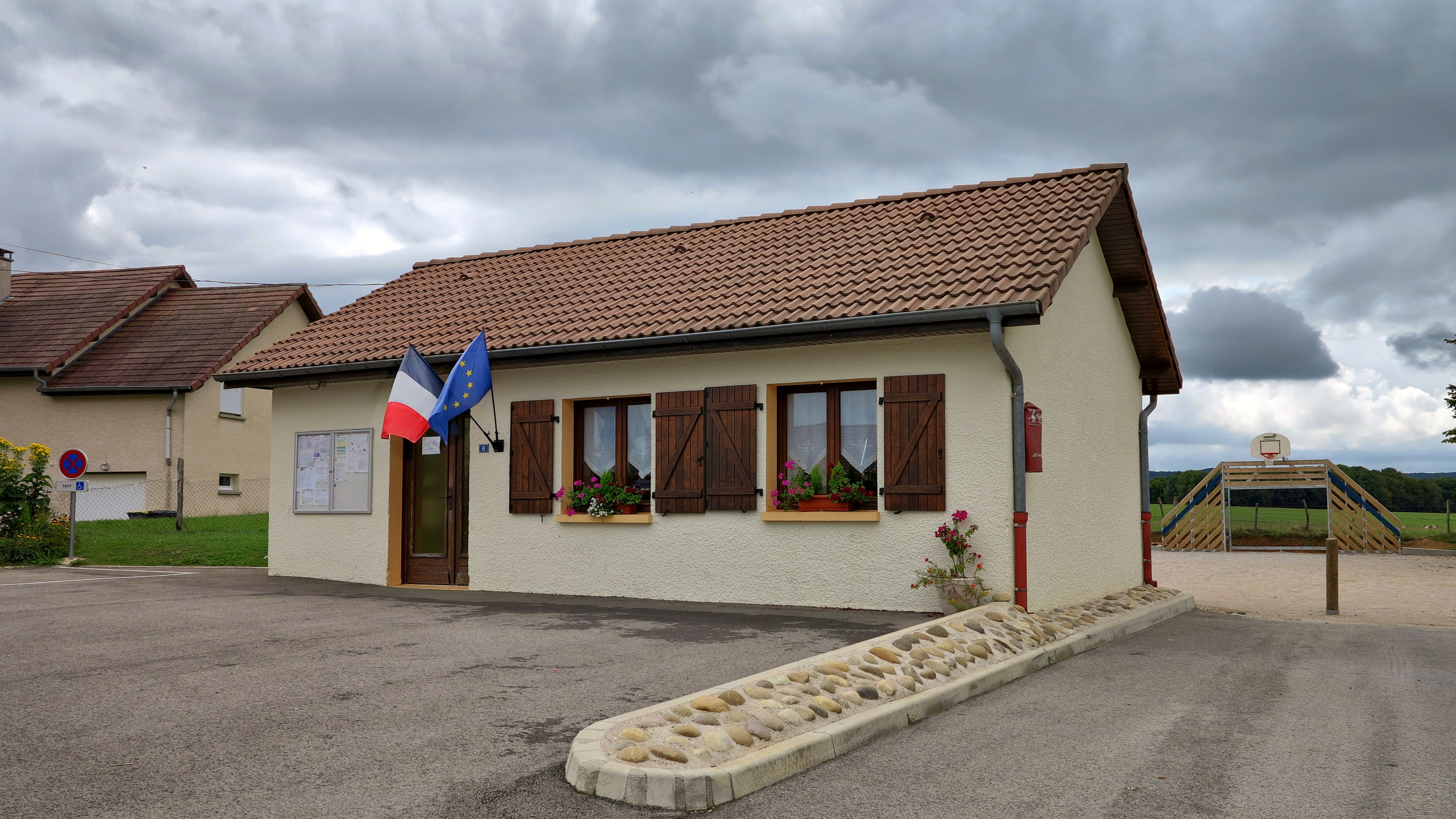
- The town hall in Val-de-Roulans
- Location of Val-de-Roulans
- Location within France Location within Bourgogne-Franche-Comté
- Coordinates: 47°21′45″N 6°15′55″E
- Country: France
- Region: Bourgogne-Franche-Comté
- Department: Doubs
- Arrondissement: Besançon
- Canton: Baume-les-Dames

Government
  - Mayor (2020–2026): Guy Hugot
- Area^{1}: 2.99 km^{2} (1.15 sq mi)
- Highest elevation: 423 m (1,388 ft)
- Lowest elevation: 364 m (1,194 ft)
- Population (2023): 190
  - Density: 64/km^{2} (160/sq mi)
- Time zone: UTC+01:00 (CET)
  - Summer (DST): UTC+02:00 (CEST)
- INSEE/Postal code: 25579 /25640
- ^{1} French Land Register data, which excludes lakes, ponds, glaciers > 1 km^{2} (0.386 sq mi or 247 acres) and river estuaries.

Val-de-Roulans (French pronunciation: [val də ʁulɑ̃]) is a commune in the Doubs department in the Bourgogne-Franche-Comté region in eastern France.

== Population ==
Historical population
Year	Pop.	±% p.a.
1968	41	—
1975	43	+0.68%
1982	50	+2.18%
1990	63	+2.93%
1999	84	+3.25%
2007	126	+5.20%
2012	169	+6.05%
2017	195	+2.90%
2023	190	−0.43%
Source: INSEE

== See also ==
- Communes of the Doubs department
