= Bretigney-Notre-Dame =

- Commune
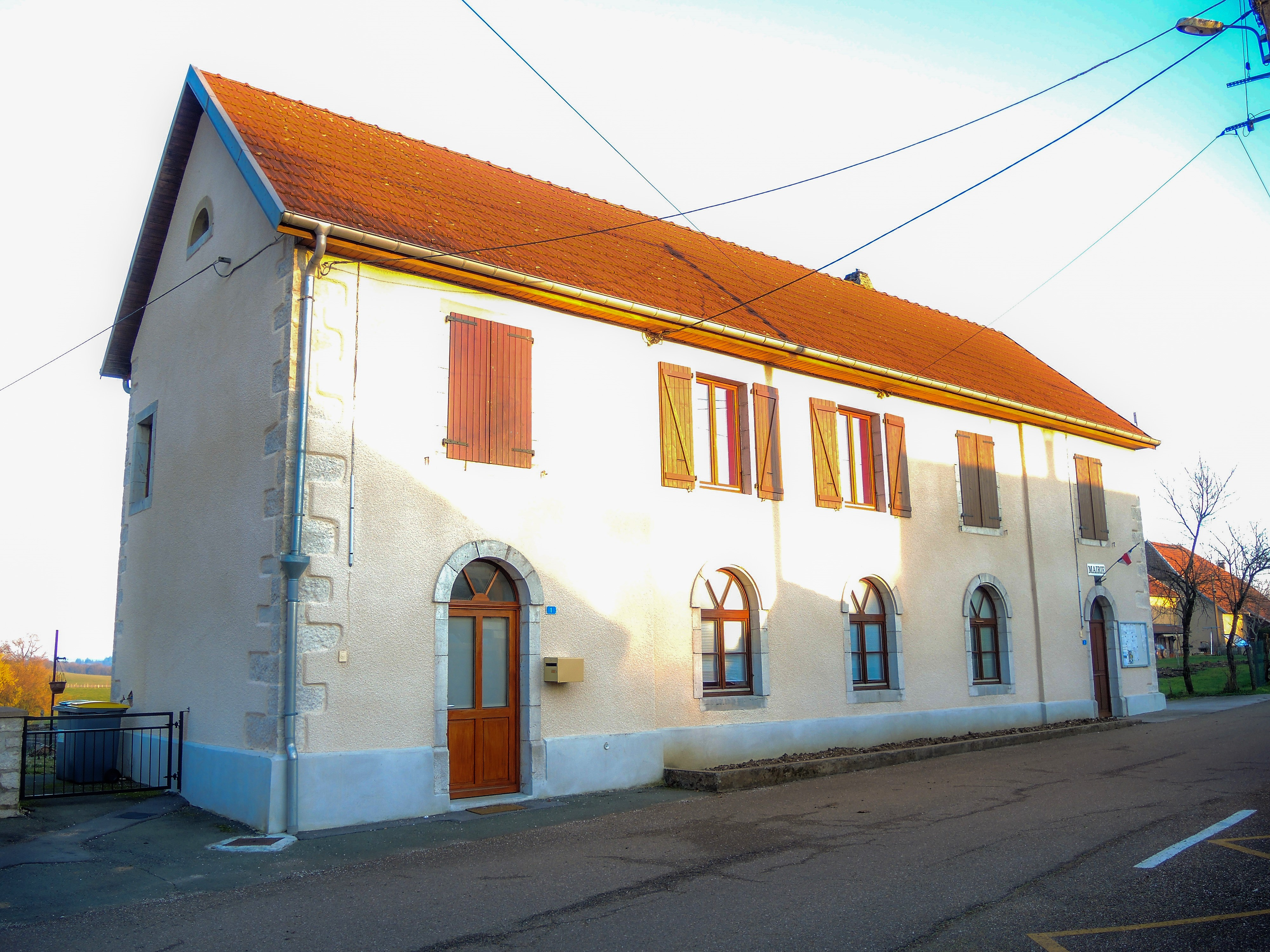
- The town hall in Bretigney-Notre-Dame
- Location of Bretigney-Notre-Dame
- Location within France Location within Bourgogne-Franche-Comté
- Coordinates: 47°18′49″N 6°18′11″E
- Country: France
- Region: Bourgogne-Franche-Comté
- Department: Doubs
- Arrondissement: Besançon
- Canton: Baume-les-Dames

Government
  - Mayor (2020–2026): Bertrand Racine
- Area^{1}: 5.62 km^{2} (2.17 sq mi)
- Highest elevation: 589 m (1,932 ft)
- Lowest elevation: 359 m (1,178 ft)
- Population (2023): 118
  - Density: 21.0/km^{2} (54.4/sq mi)
- Time zone: UTC+01:00 (CET)
  - Summer (DST): UTC+02:00 (CEST)
- INSEE/Postal code: 25094 /25110
- ^{1} French Land Register data, which excludes lakes, ponds, glaciers > 1 km^{2} (0.386 sq mi or 247 acres) and river estuaries.

Bretigney-Notre-Dame (French pronunciation: [bʁətiɲɛ nɔtʁ dam]) is a commune in the Doubs department in the Bourgogne-Franche-Comté region in eastern France.

== Population ==
Historical population
Year	Pop.	±% p.a.
1968	69	—
1975	72	+0.61%
1982	77	+0.96%
1990	95	+2.66%
1999	102	+0.79%
2007	105	+0.36%
2012	111	+1.12%
2017	110	−0.18%
2023	118	+1.18%
Source: INSEE

== See also ==
- Communes of the Doubs department
