= Cubrial =

- Commune
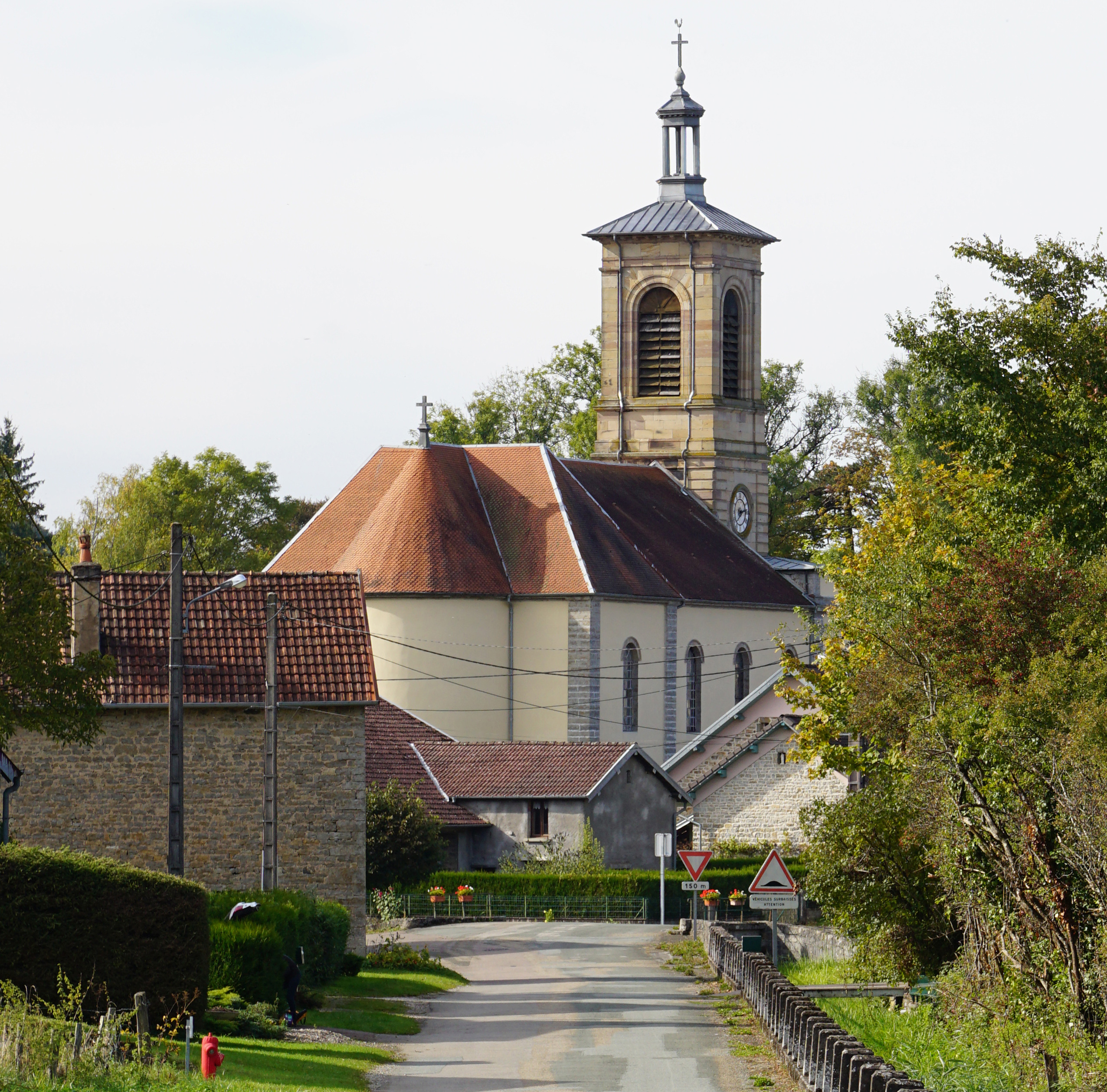
- The church in Cubrial
- Location of Cubrial
- Location within France Location within Bourgogne-Franche-Comté
- Coordinates: 47°29′48″N 6°24′28″E
- Country: France
- Region: Bourgogne-Franche-Comté
- Department: Doubs
- Arrondissement: Besançon
- Canton: Baume-les-Dames

Government
  - Mayor (2024–2026): Pierre Mahon
- Area^{1}: 5.92 km^{2} (2.29 sq mi)
- Highest elevation: 356 m (1,168 ft)
- Lowest elevation: 264 m (866 ft)
- Population (2023): 146
  - Density: 24.7/km^{2} (63.9/sq mi)
- Time zone: UTC+01:00 (CET)
  - Summer (DST): UTC+02:00 (CEST)
- INSEE/Postal code: 25181 /25680
- ^{1} French Land Register data, which excludes lakes, ponds, glaciers > 1 km^{2} (0.386 sq mi or 247 acres) and river estuaries.

Cubrial (French pronunciation: [kybʁijal]) is a commune in the Doubs department in the Bourgogne-Franche-Comté region in eastern France.

== Population ==
Historical population
Year	Pop.	±% p.a.
1968	117	—
1975	137	+2.28%
1982	131	−0.64%
1990	138	+0.65%
1999	135	−0.24%
2007	137	+0.18%
2012	137	+0.00%
2017	136	−0.15%
2023	146	+1.19%
Source: INSEE

== See also ==
- Communes of the Doubs department
