= Vennans =

- Commune
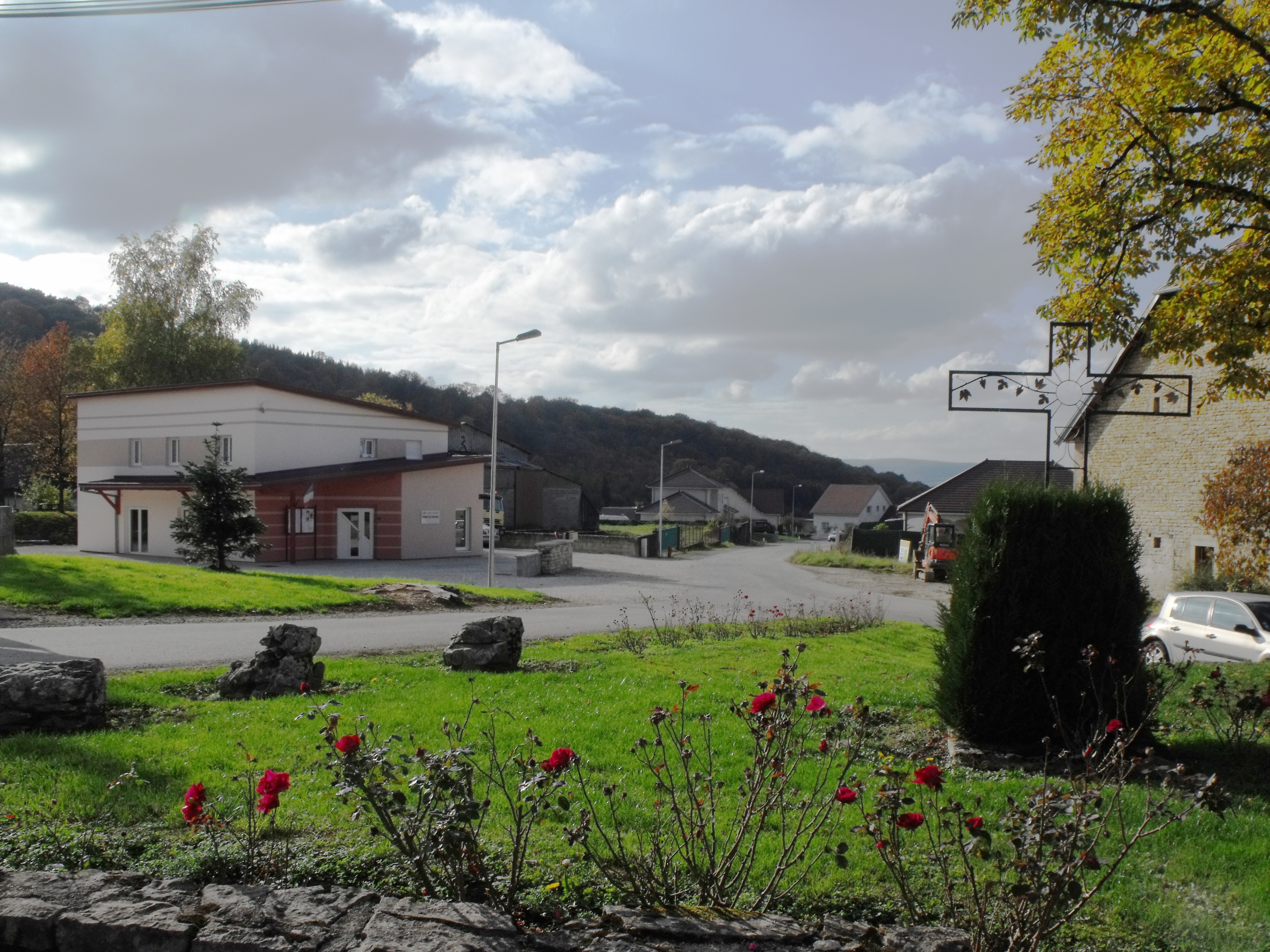
- The town hall and cross in Vennans

- Coat of arms
- Location of Vennans
- Location within France Location within Bourgogne-Franche-Comté
- Coordinates: 47°19′48″N 6°14′14″E
- Country: France
- Region: Bourgogne-Franche-Comté
- Department: Doubs
- Arrondissement: Besançon
- Canton: Baume-les-Dames

Government
  - Mayor (2020–2026): André Mesnier
- Area^{1}: 1.36 km^{2} (0.53 sq mi)
- Highest elevation: 400 m (1,300 ft)
- Lowest elevation: 299 m (981 ft)
- Population (2023): 248
  - Density: 182/km^{2} (472/sq mi)
- Time zone: UTC+01:00 (CET)
  - Summer (DST): UTC+02:00 (CEST)
- INSEE/Postal code: 25599 /25640
- ^{1} French Land Register data, which excludes lakes, ponds, glaciers > 1 km^{2} (0.386 sq mi or 247 acres) and river estuaries.

Vennans (French pronunciation: [vɛnɑ̃]) is a commune in the Doubs department in the Bourgogne-Franche-Comté region in eastern France.

== Population ==
Historical population
Year	Pop.	±% p.a.
1968	26	—
1975	16	−6.70%
1982	31	+9.91%
1990	77	+12.04%
1999	90	+1.75%
2007	173	+8.51%
2012	216	+4.54%
2017	259	+3.70%
2023	248	−0.72%
Source: INSEE

== See also ==
- Communes of the Doubs department
