= Aïssey =

- Commune
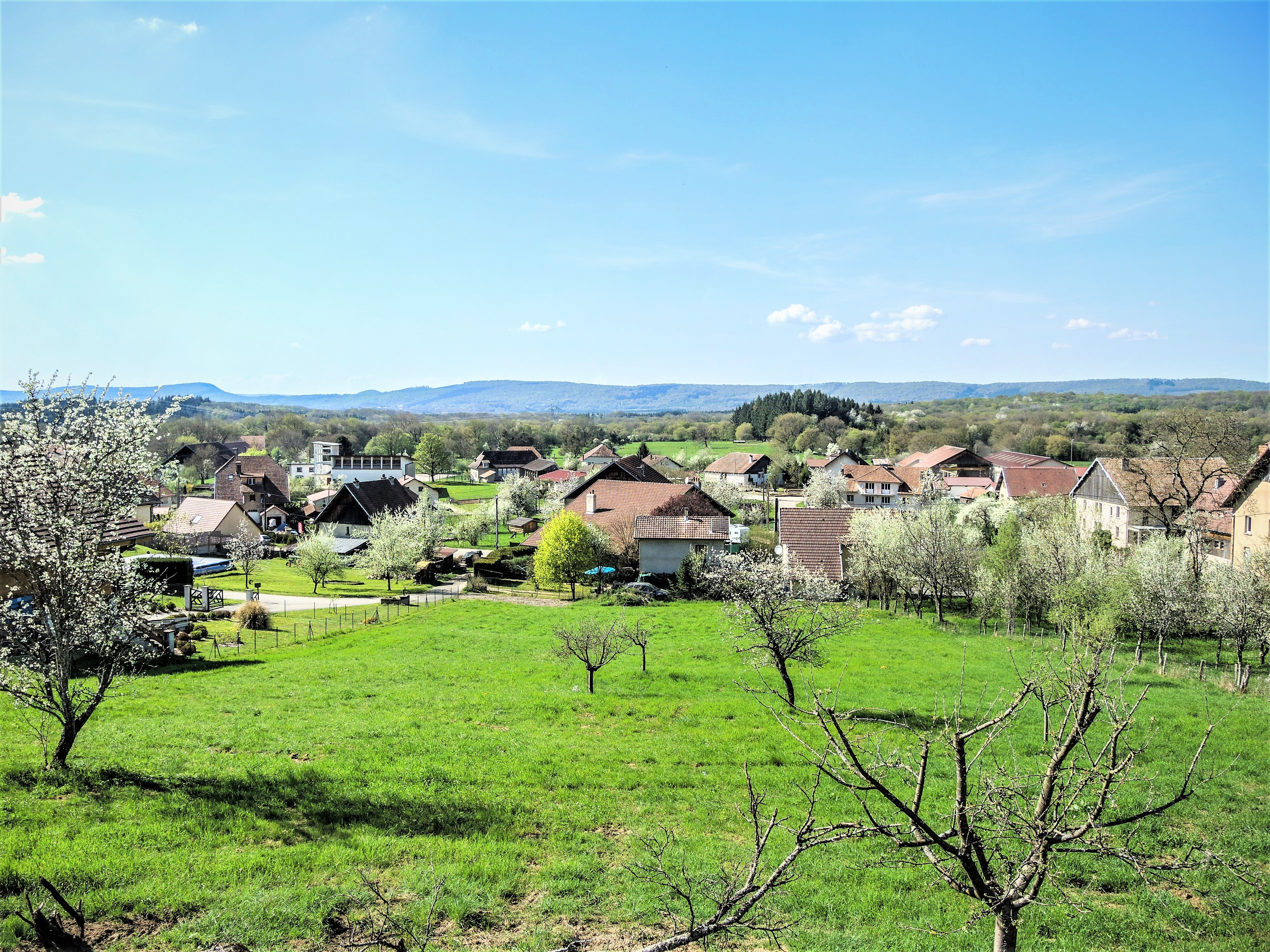
- General view

- Coat of arms
- Location of Aïssey
- Location within France Location within Bourgogne-Franche-Comté
- Coordinates: 47°16′09″N 6°19′57″E
- Country: France
- Region: Bourgogne-Franche-Comté
- Department: Doubs
- Arrondissement: Besançon
- Canton: Baume-les-Dames
- Intercommunality: Doubs Baumois

Government
  - Mayor (2020–2026): Michel Barbier
- Area^{1}: 10.67 km^{2} (4.12 sq mi)
- Highest elevation: 599 m (1,965 ft)
- Lowest elevation: 370 m (1,210 ft)
- Population (2023): 168
  - Density: 15.7/km^{2} (40.8/sq mi)
- Time zone: UTC+01:00 (CET)
  - Summer (DST): UTC+02:00 (CEST)
- INSEE/Postal code: 25009 /25360
- ^{1} French Land Register data, which excludes lakes, ponds, glaciers > 1 km^{2} (0.386 sq mi or 247 acres) and river estuaries.

Aïssey (French pronunciation: [a.isɛ]) is a commune in the Doubs department in the Bourgogne-Franche-Comté region in eastern France.

== Population ==
Historical population
Year	Pop.	±% p.a.
1968	160	—
1975	144	−1.49%
1982	137	−0.71%
1990	163	+2.20%
1999	166	+0.20%
2007	163	−0.23%
2012	171	+0.96%
2017	169	−0.24%
2023	168	−0.10%
Source: INSEE

== See also ==
- Communes of the Doubs department
