= Uzelle =

- Commune
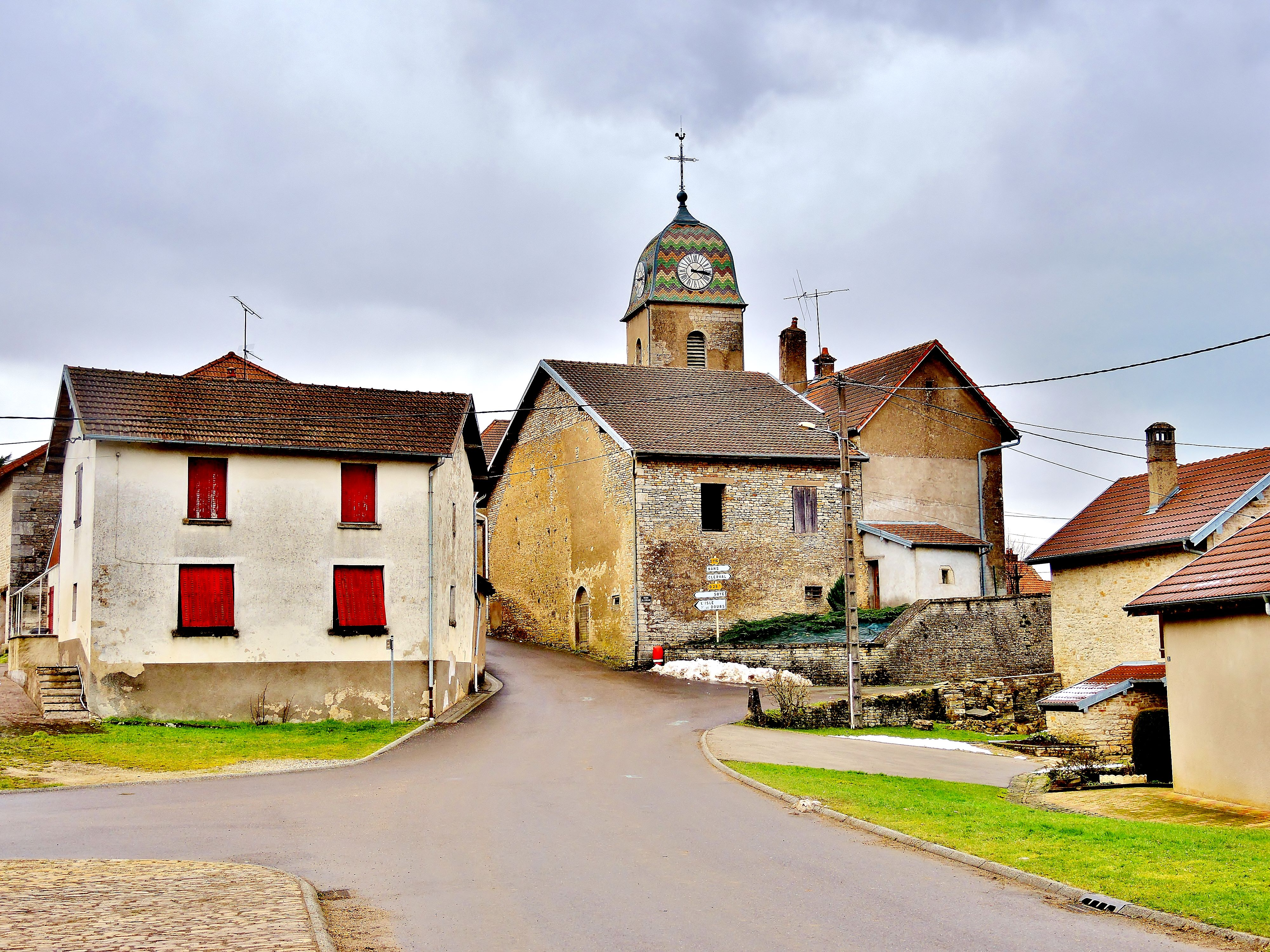
- A view within Uzelle
- Location of Uzelle
- Location within France Location within Bourgogne-Franche-Comté
- Coordinates: 47°28′01″N 6°26′12″E
- Country: France
- Region: Bourgogne-Franche-Comté
- Department: Doubs
- Arrondissement: Besançon
- Canton: Baume-les-Dames
- Intercommunality: Deux Vallées Vertes

Government
  - Mayor (2020–2026): Emmanuelle Bianchi-Laville
- Area^{1}: 11.75 km^{2} (4.54 sq mi)
- Highest elevation: 467 m (1,532 ft)
- Lowest elevation: 322 m (1,056 ft)
- Population (2023): 194
  - Density: 16.5/km^{2} (42.8/sq mi)
- Time zone: UTC+01:00 (CET)
  - Summer (DST): UTC+02:00 (CEST)
- INSEE/Postal code: 25574 /25340
- ^{1} French Land Register data, which excludes lakes, ponds, glaciers > 1 km^{2} (0.386 sq mi or 247 acres) and river estuaries.

Uzelle (French pronunciation: [yzɛl]) is a commune in the Doubs department in the Bourgogne-Franche-Comté region in eastern France.

== Geography ==
The commune covers an area of 11.75 km², with elevations ranging from 322 meters at its lowest point to 467 meters at its highest, while the elevation of the town center is approximately 390–395 meters.

== Population ==
Historical population
Year	Pop.	±% p.a.
1968	172	—
1975	166	−0.51%
1982	180	+1.16%
1990	182	+0.14%
1999	156	−1.70%
2007	154	−0.16%
2012	163	+1.14%
2017	172	+1.08%
2023	194	+2.03%
Source: INSEE

== See also ==
- Communes of the Doubs department
