= Gouhelans =

- Commune
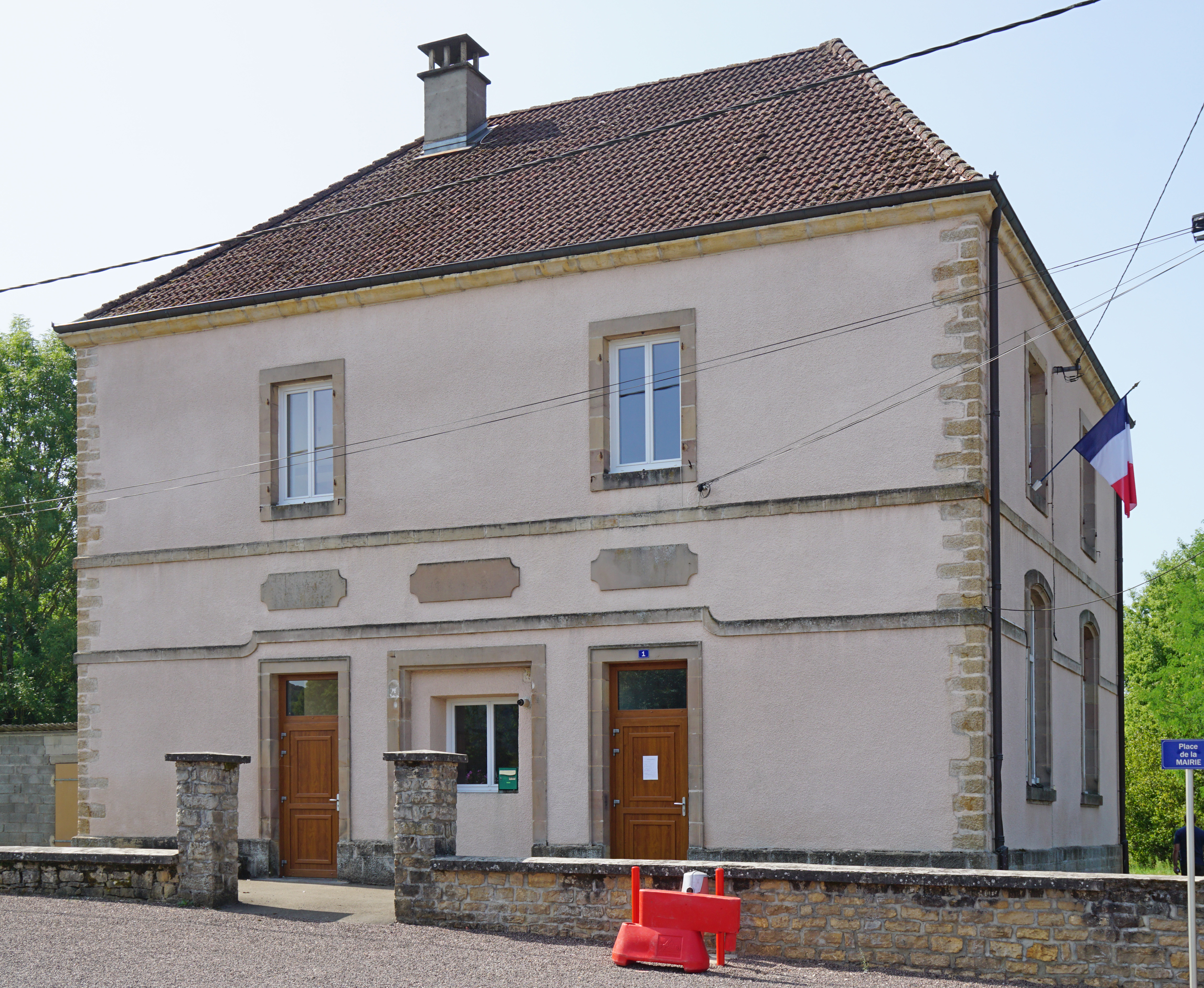
- The town hall in Gouhelans
- Location of Gouhelans
- Location within France Location within Bourgogne-Franche-Comté
- Coordinates: 47°27′25″N 6°21′14″E
- Country: France
- Region: Bourgogne-Franche-Comté
- Department: Doubs
- Arrondissement: Besançon
- Canton: Baume-les-Dames

Government
  - Mayor (2020–2026): Victorien Piegelin
- Area^{1}: 6.17 km^{2} (2.38 sq mi)
- Highest elevation: 438 m (1,437 ft)
- Lowest elevation: 265 m (869 ft)
- Population (2023): 118
  - Density: 19.1/km^{2} (49.5/sq mi)
- Time zone: UTC+01:00 (CET)
  - Summer (DST): UTC+02:00 (CEST)
- INSEE/Postal code: 25279 /25680
- ^{1} French Land Register data, which excludes lakes, ponds, glaciers > 1 km^{2} (0.386 sq mi or 247 acres) and river estuaries.

Gouhelans is a commune in the Doubs department in the Bourgogne-Franche-Comté region in eastern France.

== Population ==
Historical population
Year	Pop.	±% p.a.
1968	113	—
1975	89	−3.35%
1982	88	−0.16%
1990	83	−0.73%
1999	116	+3.79%
2007	115	−0.11%
2012	110	−0.89%
2017	118	+1.41%
2023	118	+0.00%
Source: INSEE

== See also ==
- Communes of the Doubs department
