= Corcelle-Mieslot =

- Commune
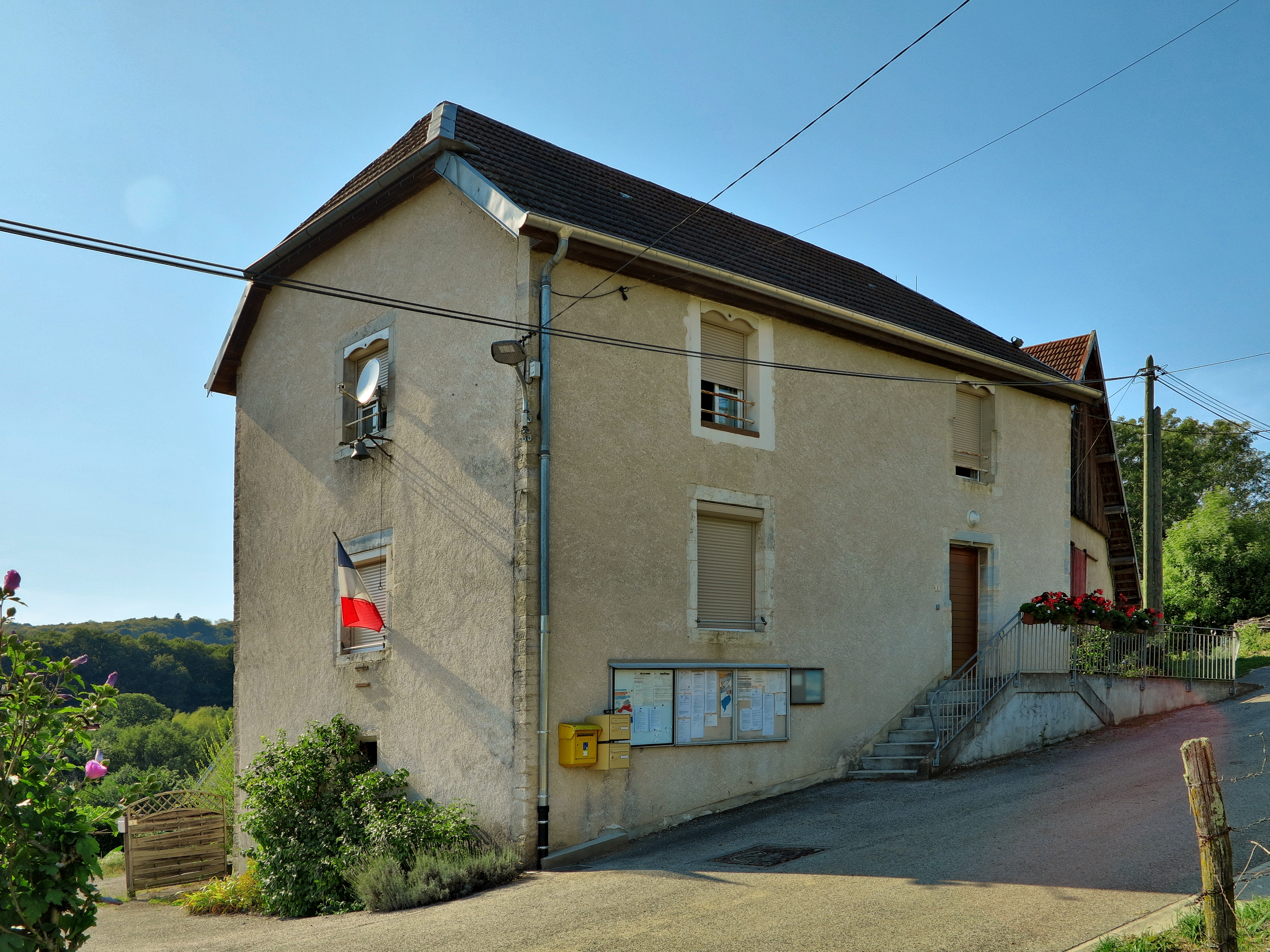
- The town hall in Corcelle-Mieslot
- Location of Corcelle-Mieslot
- Location within France Location within Bourgogne-Franche-Comté
- Coordinates: 47°21′39″N 6°11′16″E
- Country: France
- Region: Bourgogne-Franche-Comté
- Department: Doubs
- Arrondissement: Besançon
- Canton: Baume-les-Dames

Government
  - Mayor (2020–2026): Sandra Bideaux
- Area^{1}: 6.42 km^{2} (2.48 sq mi)
- Highest elevation: 444 m (1,457 ft)
- Lowest elevation: 232 m (761 ft)
- Population (2023): 88
  - Density: 14/km^{2} (36/sq mi)
- Time zone: UTC+01:00 (CET)
  - Summer (DST): UTC+02:00 (CEST)
- INSEE/Postal code: 25163 /25640
- ^{1} French Land Register data, which excludes lakes, ponds, glaciers > 1 km^{2} (0.386 sq mi or 247 acres) and river estuaries.

Corcelle-Mieslot (French pronunciation: [kɔʁsɛl mjɛlo]) is a commune in the Doubs department in the Bourgogne-Franche-Comté region in eastern France.

== Population ==
Historical population
Year	Pop.	±% p.a.
1968	45	—
1975	42	−0.98%
1982	55	+3.93%
1990	88	+6.05%
1999	83	−0.65%
2007	103	+2.74%
2012	110	+1.32%
2017	109	−0.18%
2023	88	−3.50%
Source: INSEE

== See also ==
- Communes of the Doubs department
