= Thurey-le-Mont =

- Commune
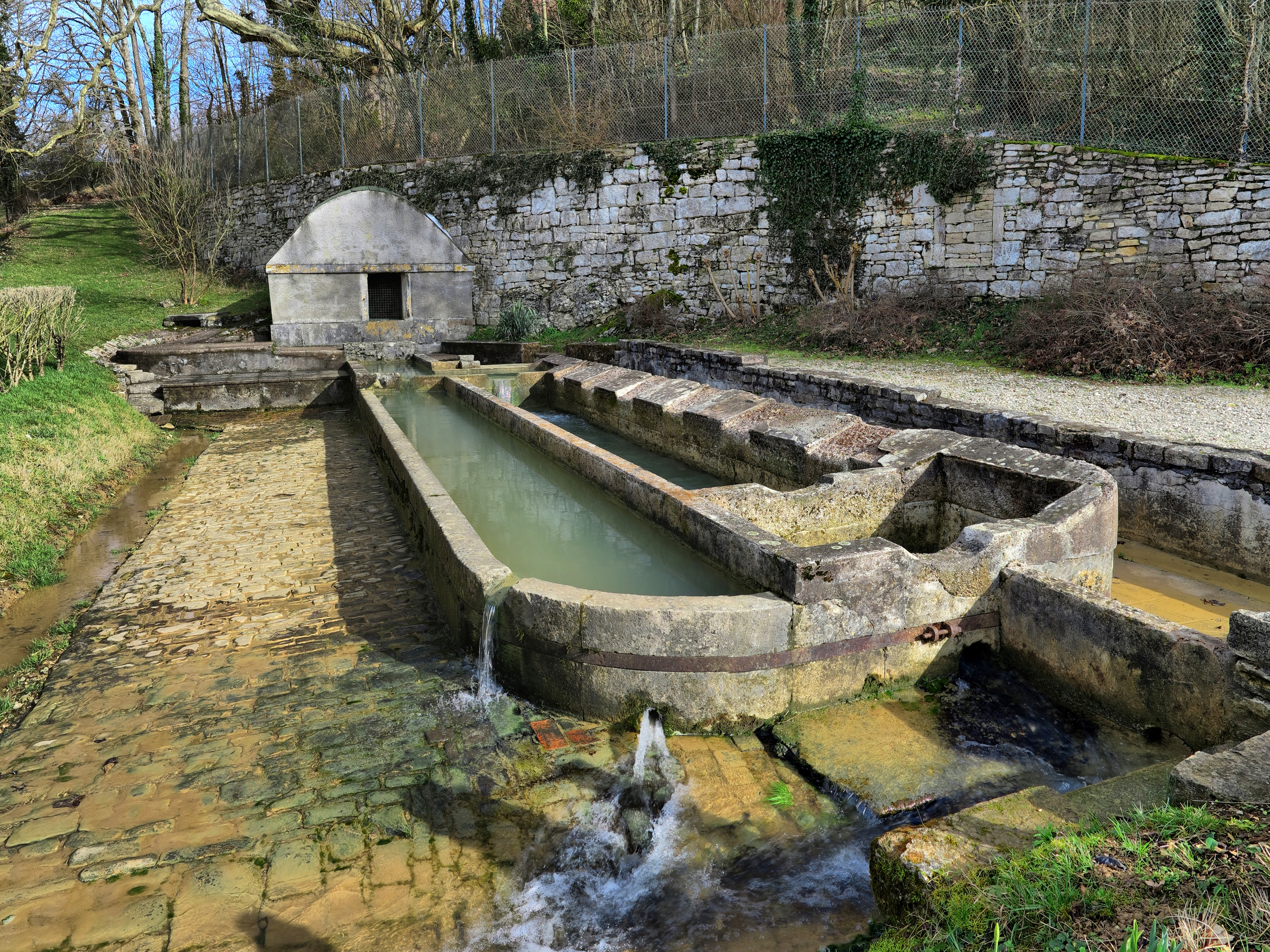
- The wash house in Thurey-le-Mont
- Location of Thurey-le-Mont
- Location within France Location within Bourgogne-Franche-Comté
- Coordinates: 47°22′24″N 6°07′27″E
- Country: France
- Region: Bourgogne-Franche-Comté
- Department: Doubs
- Arrondissement: Besançon
- Canton: Baume-les-Dames

Government
  - Mayor (2020–2026): Jean-Paul Faivre
- Area^{1}: 4.83 km^{2} (1.86 sq mi)
- Highest elevation: 283 m (928 ft)
- Lowest elevation: 218 m (715 ft)
- Population (2023): 114
  - Density: 23.6/km^{2} (61.1/sq mi)
- Time zone: UTC+01:00 (CET)
  - Summer (DST): UTC+02:00 (CEST)
- INSEE/Postal code: 25563 /25870
- ^{1} French Land Register data, which excludes lakes, ponds, glaciers > 1 km^{2} (0.386 sq mi or 247 acres) and river estuaries.

Thurey-le-Mont (French pronunciation: [tyʁɛ lə mɔ̃]) is a commune in the Doubs department in the Bourgogne-Franche-Comté region in eastern France.

== Geography ==
The commune lies 9 km (5.6 mi) north of Marchaux above the valley of the Ognon. Half of its territory is covered by forest.

== Population ==
Historical population
Year	Pop.	±% p.a.
1968	56	—
1975	64	+1.93%
1982	94	+5.65%
1990	100	+0.78%
1999	106	+0.65%
2007	112	+0.69%
2012	109	−0.54%
2017	129	+3.43%
2023	114	−2.04%
Source: INSEE

== See also ==
- Communes of the Doubs department
