= Autechaux =

- Commune
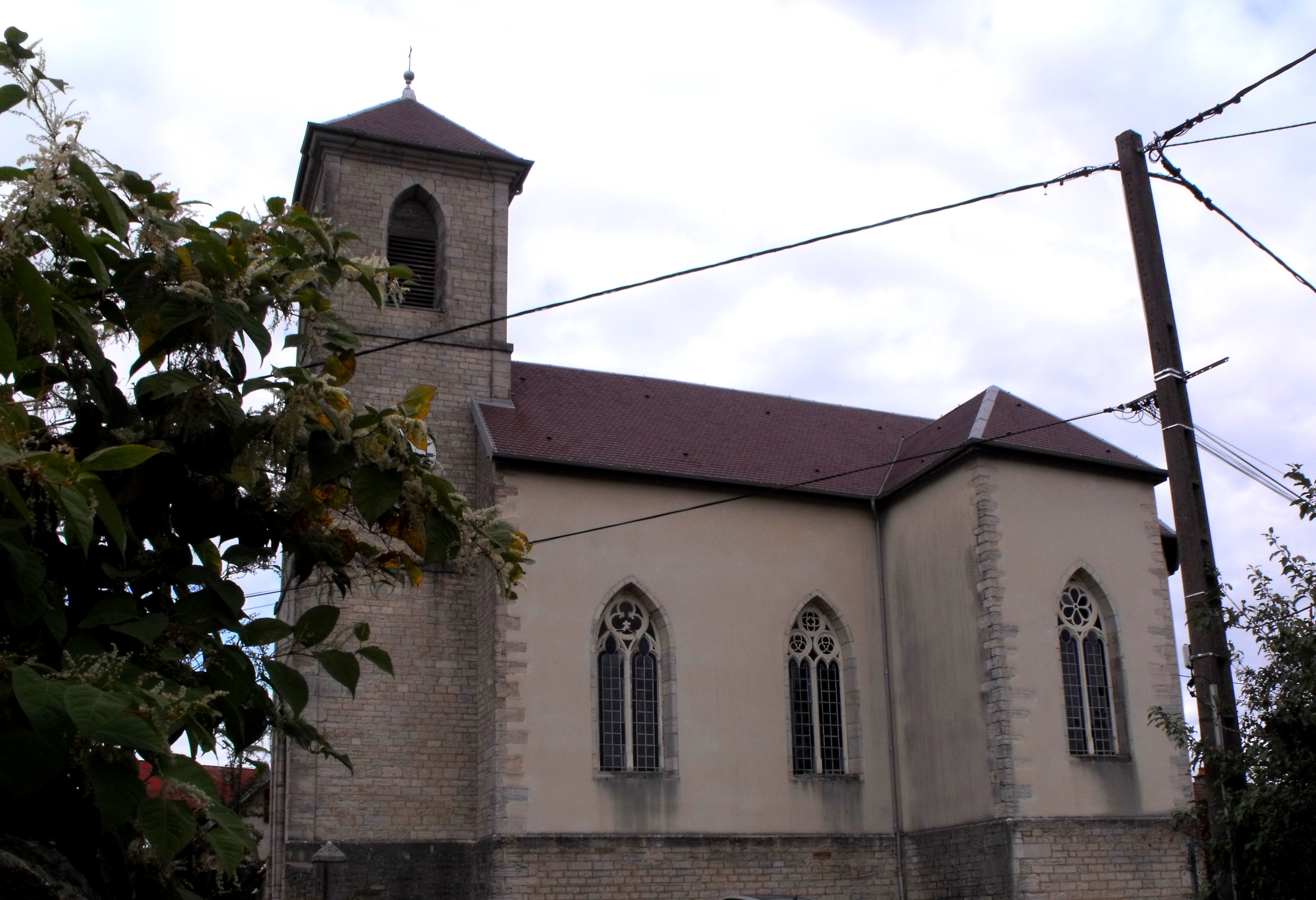
- The Lutheran church in Autechaux
- Location of Autechaux
- Location within France Location within Bourgogne-Franche-Comté
- Coordinates: 47°22′43″N 6°23′09″E
- Country: France
- Region: Bourgogne-Franche-Comté
- Department: Doubs
- Arrondissement: Besançon
- Canton: Baume-les-Dames
- Intercommunality: CC Doubs Baumois

Government
  - Mayor (2020–2026): Jean-Yves Brunella
- Area^{1}: 6.59 km^{2} (2.54 sq mi)
- Highest elevation: 505 m (1,657 ft)
- Lowest elevation: 409 m (1,342 ft)
- Population (2023): 449
  - Density: 68.1/km^{2} (176/sq mi)
- Time zone: UTC+01:00 (CET)
  - Summer (DST): UTC+02:00 (CEST)
- INSEE/Postal code: 25032 /25110
- ^{1} French Land Register data, which excludes lakes, ponds, glaciers > 1 km^{2} (0.386 sq mi or 247 acres) and river estuaries.

Autechaux (French pronunciation: [ot(ə)ʃo]) is a commune in the Doubs department in the Bourgogne-Franche-Comté region in eastern France.

== Population ==
Historical population
Year	Pop.	±% p.a.
1968	136	—
1975	170	+3.24%
1982	204	+2.64%
1990	255	+2.83%
1999	265	+0.43%
2007	374	+4.40%
2012	409	+1.81%
2017	420	+0.53%
2023	449	+1.12%
Source: INSEE

== See also ==
- Communes of the Doubs department
