= Vergranne =

- Commune
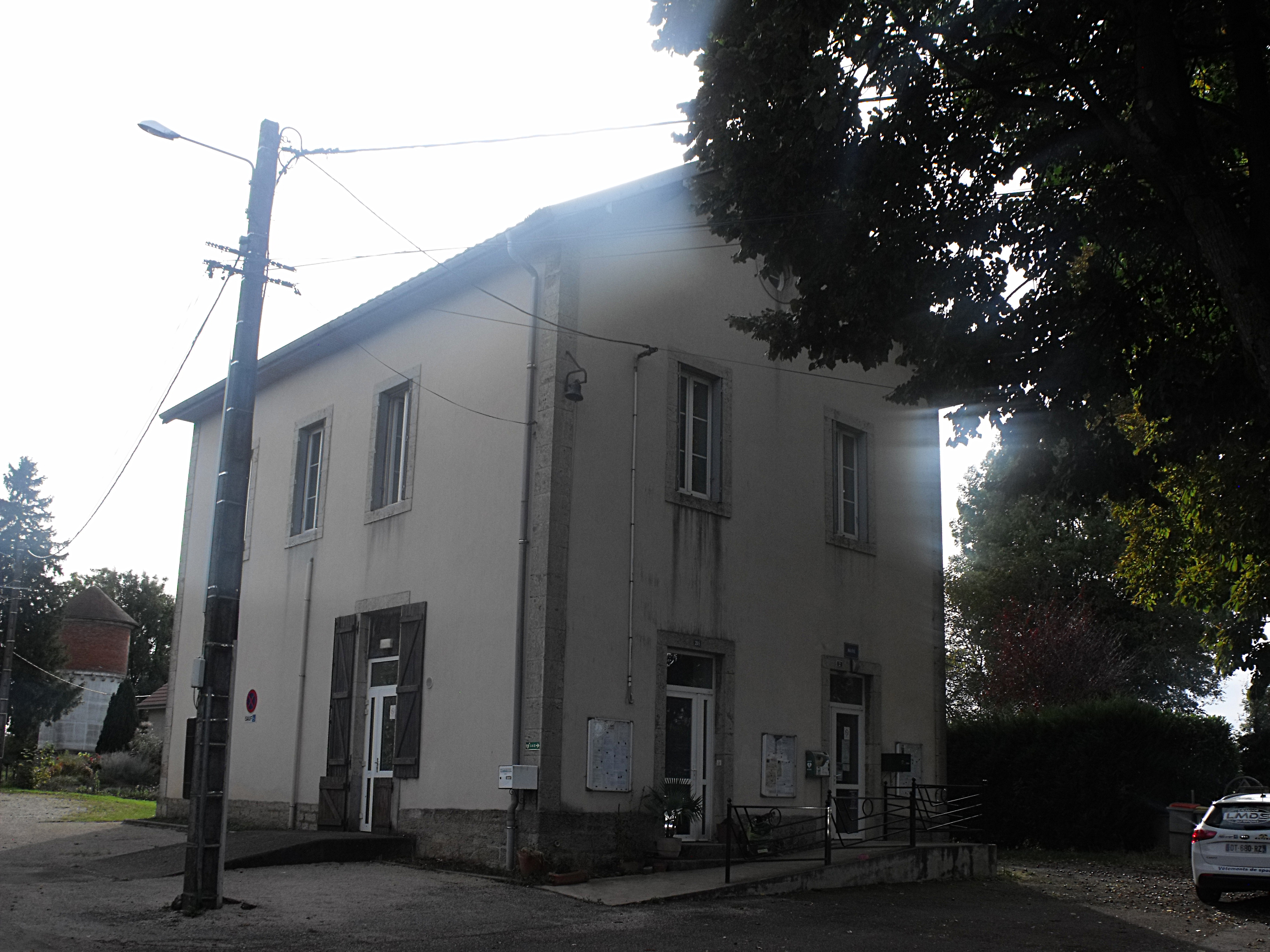
- The town hall in Vergranne
- Location of Vergranne
- Location within France Location within Bourgogne-Franche-Comté
- Coordinates: 47°24′35″N 6°23′29″E
- Country: France
- Region: Bourgogne-Franche-Comté
- Department: Doubs
- Arrondissement: Besançon
- Canton: Baume-les-Dames
- Intercommunality: Doubs Baumois

Government
  - Mayor (2020–2026): Didier Cuenot
- Area^{1}: 5.18 km^{2} (2.00 sq mi)
- Highest elevation: 462 m (1,516 ft)
- Lowest elevation: 413 m (1,355 ft)
- Population (2023): 116
  - Density: 22.4/km^{2} (58.0/sq mi)
- Time zone: UTC+01:00 (CET)
  - Summer (DST): UTC+02:00 (CEST)
- INSEE/Postal code: 25602 /25110
- ^{1} French Land Register data, which excludes lakes, ponds, glaciers > 1 km^{2} (0.386 sq mi or 247 acres) and river estuaries.

Vergranne (French pronunciation: [vɛʁɡʁan]) is a commune in the Doubs department in the Bourgogne-Franche-Comté region in eastern France.

== Population ==
Historical population
Year	Pop.	±% p.a.
1968	82	—
1975	60	−4.36%
1982	71	+2.43%
1990	77	+1.02%
1999	98	+2.72%
2007	127	+3.29%
2012	100	−4.67%
2017	108	+1.55%
2023	116	+1.20%
Source: INSEE

== See also ==
- Communes of the Doubs department
