= Canton of Baume-les-Dames =

Coordinates: 47.35°N 6.36°E

The canton of Baume-les-Dames is an administrative division of the Doubs department, eastern France. Its borders were modified at the French canton reorganisation which came into effect in March 2015. Its seat is in Baume-les-Dames.

It consists of the following communes:

1. Abbenans
2. Adam-lès-Passavant
3. Aïssey
4. Autechaux
5. Avilley
6. Battenans-les-Mines
7. Baume-les-Dames
8. Blarians
9. Bonnal
10. Bonnay
11. Bouclans
12. Breconchaux
13. La Bretenière
14. Bretigney-Notre-Dame
15. Cendrey
16. Champlive
17. Châtillon-Guyotte
18. Chevroz
19. Corcelle-Mieslot
20. Côtebrune
21. Cubrial
22. Cubry
23. Cusance
24. Cuse-et-Adrisans
25. Cussey-sur-l'Ognon
26. Dammartin-les-Templiers
27. Devecey
28. L'Écouvotte
29. Esnans
30. Flagey-Rigney
31. Fontenelle-Montby
32. Fontenotte
33. Fourbanne
34. Geneuille
35. Germondans
36. Glamondans
37. Gondenans-Montby
38. Gondenans-les-Moulins
39. Gonsans
40. Gouhelans
41. Grosbois
42. Guillon-les-Bains
43. Huanne-Montmartin
44. Hyèvre-Magny
45. Hyèvre-Paroisse
46. Laissey
47. Lomont-sur-Crête
48. Luxiol
49. Mérey-Vieilley
50. Mésandans
51. Moncey
52. Mondon
53. Montagney-Servigney
54. Montivernage
55. Montussaint
56. Naisey-les-Granges
57. Nans
58. Ollans
59. Osse
60. Ougney-Douvot
61. Palise
62. Passavant
63. Pont-les-Moulins
64. Pouligney-Lusans
65. Puessans
66. Le Puy
67. Rigney
68. Rignosot
69. Rillans
70. Rognon
71. Romain
72. Rougemont
73. Rougemontot
74. Roulans
75. Saint-Hilaire
76. Saint-Juan
77. Séchin
78. Silley-Bléfond
79. Tallans
80. Thurey-le-Mont
81. La Tour-de-Sçay
82. Tournans
83. Tressandans
84. Trouvans
85. Uzelle
86. Val-de-Roulans
87. Valleroy
88. Venise
89. Vennans
90. Vergranne
91. Verne
92. Vieilley
93. Viéthorey
94. Villers-Grélot
95. Villers-Saint-Martin
96. Voillans
