= L'Écouvotte =

- Commune
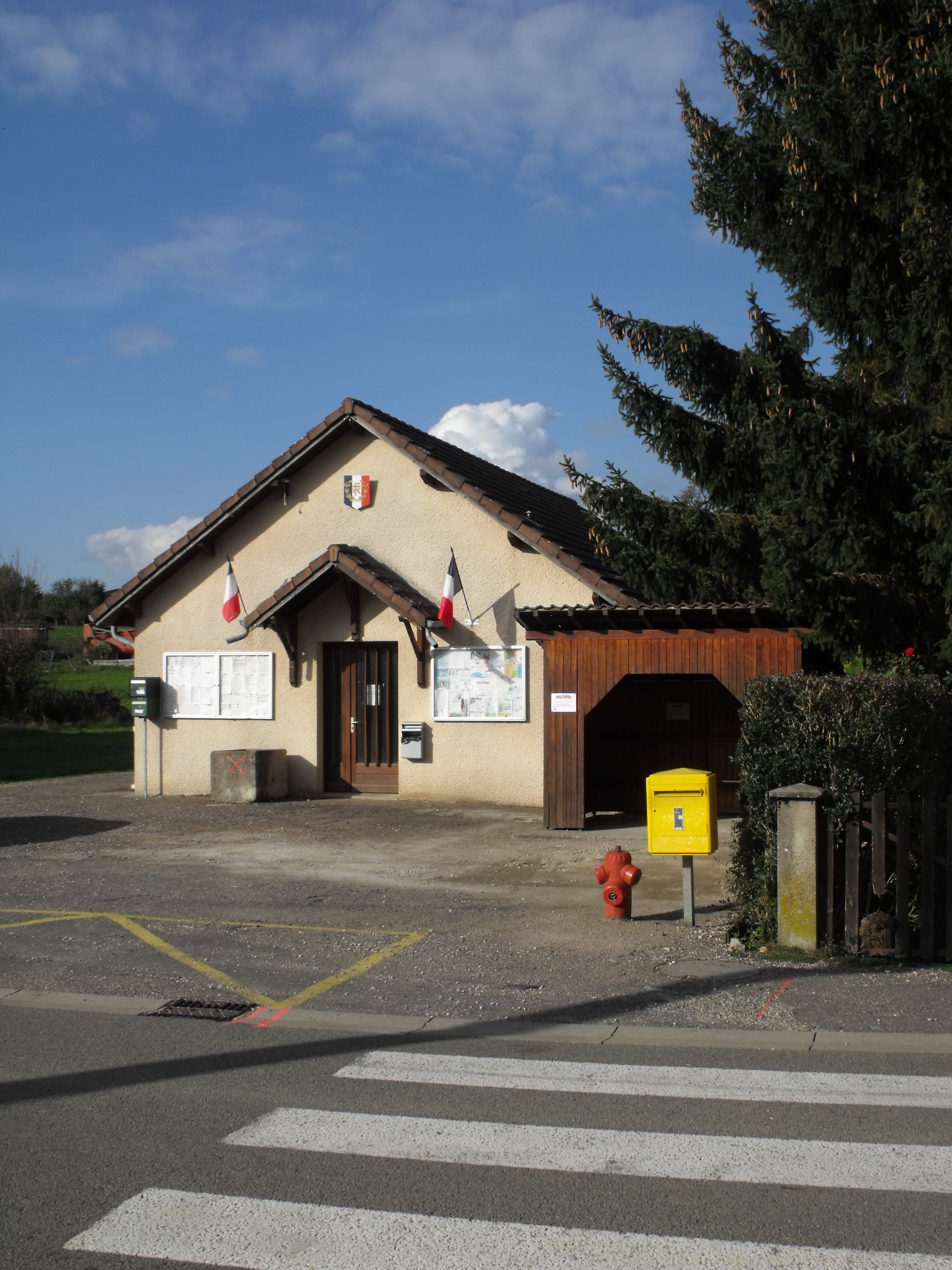
- The town hall in L'Écouvotte
- Location of L'Écouvotte
- Location within France Location within Bourgogne-Franche-Comté
- Coordinates: 47°20′29″N 6°15′06″E
- Country: France
- Region: Bourgogne-Franche-Comté
- Department: Doubs
- Arrondissement: Besançon
- Canton: Baume-les-Dames
- Area^{1}: 2.16 km^{2} (0.83 sq mi)
- Elevation: 292 m (958 ft)
- Highest elevation: 383 m (1,257 ft)
- Lowest elevation: 325 m (1,066 ft)
- Population (2023): 101
  - Density: 46.8/km^{2} (121/sq mi)
- Time zone: UTC+01:00 (CET)
  - Summer (DST): UTC+02:00 (CEST)
- INSEE/Postal code: 25215 /25640
- ^{1} French Land Register data, which excludes lakes, ponds, glaciers > 1 km^{2} (0.386 sq mi or 247 acres) and river estuaries.

L'Écouvotte (French pronunciation: [lekuvɔt]) is a commune in the Doubs department in the Bourgogne-Franche-Comté region in eastern France.

== Population ==
Historical population
Year	Pop.	±% p.a.
1968	25	—
1975	24	−0.58%
1982	50	+11.05%
1990	53	+0.73%
1999	73	+3.62%
2007	109	+5.14%
2012	100	−1.71%
2017	92	−1.65%
2023	101	+1.57%
Source: INSEE

== See also ==
- Communes of the Doubs department
