= Guillon-les-Bains =

- Commune
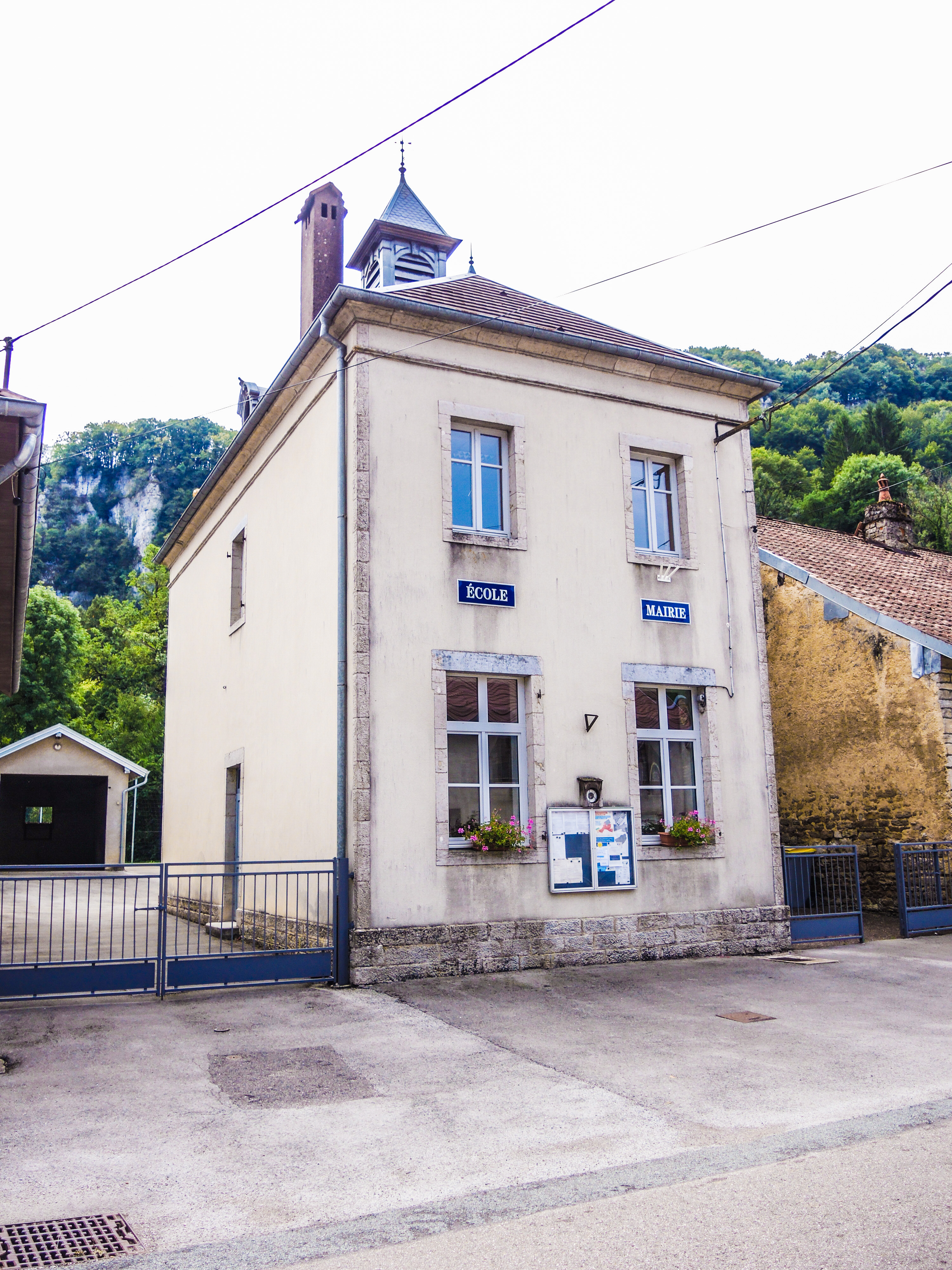
- The town hall in Guillon-les-Bains
- Location of Guillon-les-Bains
- Location within France Location within Bourgogne-Franche-Comté
- Coordinates: 47°19′11″N 6°23′39″E
- Country: France
- Region: Bourgogne-Franche-Comté
- Department: Doubs
- Arrondissement: Besançon
- Canton: Baume-les-Dames

Government
  - Mayor (2020–2026): Damien Cartier
- Area^{1}: 4.72 km^{2} (1.82 sq mi)
- Highest elevation: 561 m (1,841 ft)
- Lowest elevation: 286 m (938 ft)
- Population (2023): 108
  - Density: 22.9/km^{2} (59.3/sq mi)
- Time zone: UTC+01:00 (CET)
  - Summer (DST): UTC+02:00 (CEST)
- INSEE/Postal code: 25299 /25110
- ^{1} French Land Register data, which excludes lakes, ponds, glaciers > 1 km^{2} (0.386 sq mi or 247 acres) and river estuaries.

Guillon-les-Bains (French pronunciation: [ɡijɔ̃ le bɛ̃]) is a commune in the Doubs department in the Bourgogne-Franche-Comté region in eastern France.

== Population ==
Historical population
Year	Pop.	±% p.a.
1968	93	—
1975	87	−0.95%
1982	103	+2.44%
1990	100	−0.37%
1999	118	+1.86%
2007	129	+1.12%
2012	102	−4.59%
2017	109	+1.34%
2023	108	−0.15%
Source: INSEE

== See also ==
- Communes of the Doubs department
