= Fontenotte =

- Commune
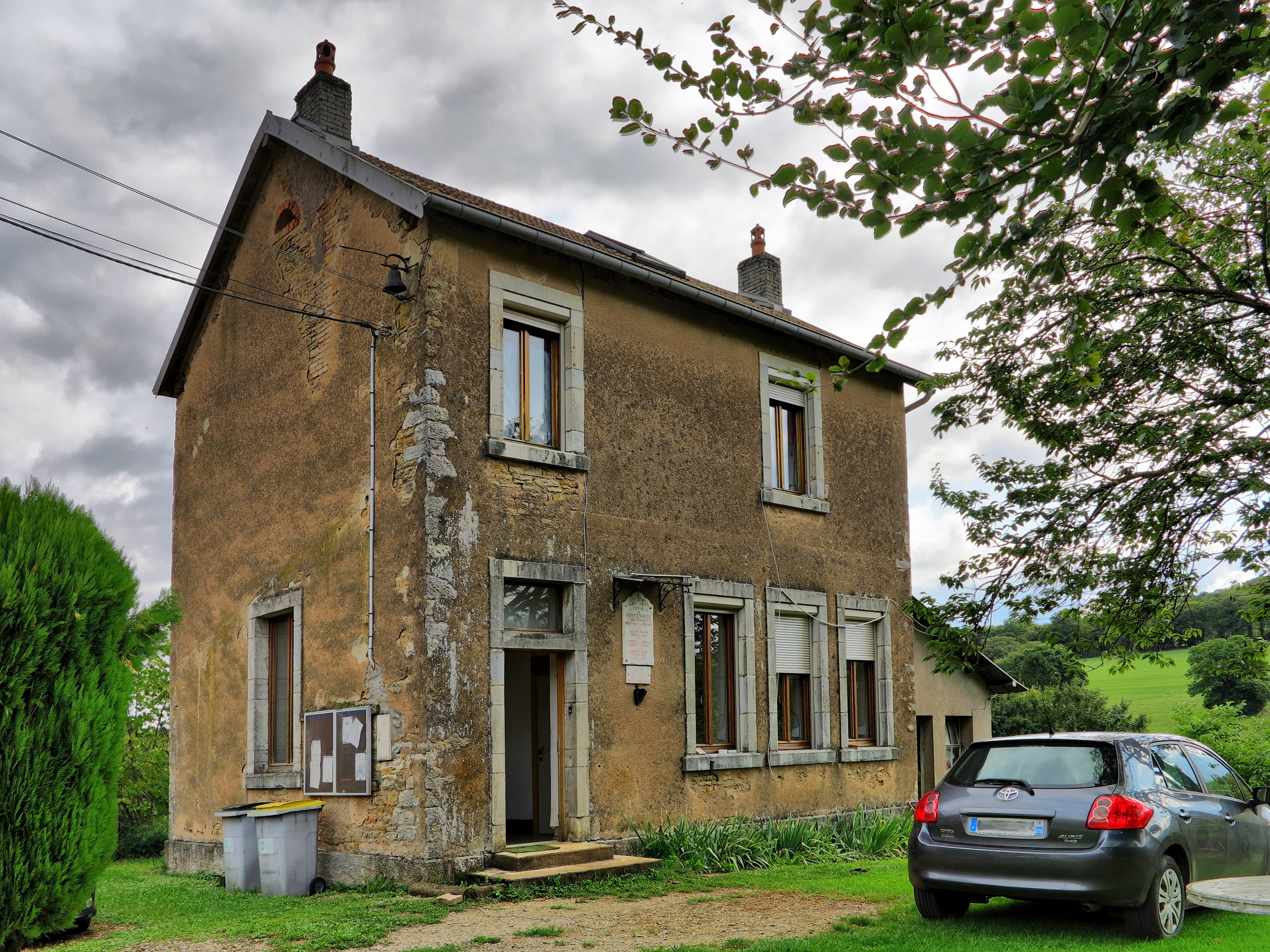
- The town hall in Fontenotte
- Location of Fontenotte
- Location within France Location within Bourgogne-Franche-Comté
- Coordinates: 47°22′38″N 6°19′24″E
- Country: France
- Region: Bourgogne-Franche-Comté
- Department: Doubs
- Arrondissement: Besançon
- Canton: Baume-les-Dames

Government
  - Mayor (2020–2026): Benoît Parent
- Area^{1}: 5.65 km^{2} (2.18 sq mi)
- Highest elevation: 478 m (1,568 ft)
- Lowest elevation: 337 m (1,106 ft)
- Population (2023): 60
  - Density: 11/km^{2} (28/sq mi)
- Time zone: UTC+01:00 (CET)
  - Summer (DST): UTC+02:00 (CEST)
- INSEE/Postal code: 25249 /25110
- ^{1} French Land Register data, which excludes lakes, ponds, glaciers > 1 km^{2} (0.386 sq mi or 247 acres) and river estuaries.

Fontenotte (French pronunciation: [fɔ̃tnɔt]) is a commune in the Doubs department in the Bourgogne-Franche-Comté region in eastern France.

== Population ==
Historical population
Year	Pop.	±% p.a.
1968	30	—
1975	27	−1.49%
1982	30	+1.52%
1990	44	+4.90%
1999	45	+0.25%
2007	53	+2.07%
2012	58	+1.82%
2017	62	+1.34%
2023	60	−0.55%
Source: INSEE

== See also ==
- Communes of the Doubs department
