= Cendrey =

- Commune
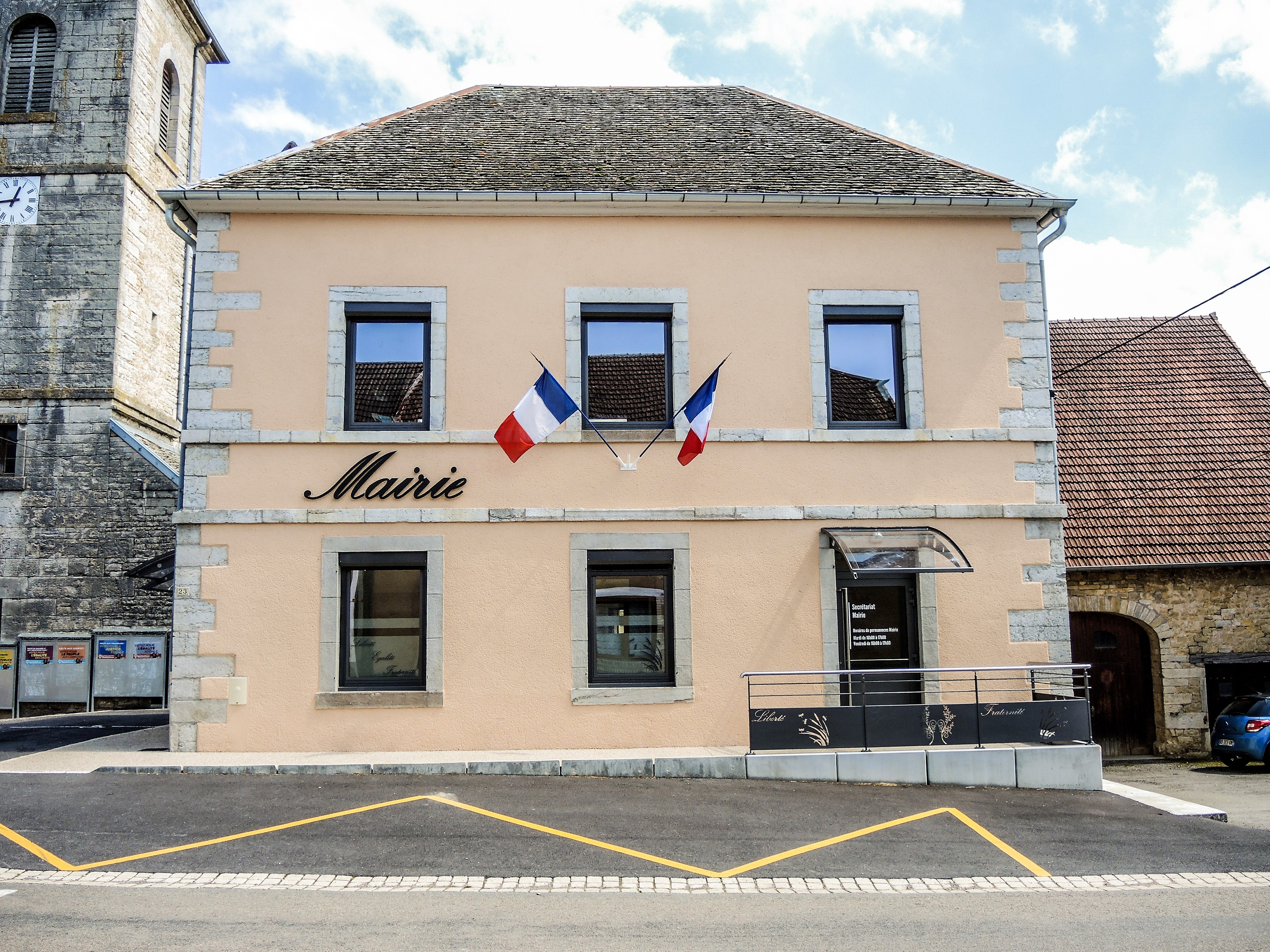
- The town hall in Cendrey
- Location of Cendrey
- Location within France Location within Bourgogne-Franche-Comté
- Coordinates: 47°24′17″N 6°14′44″E
- Country: France
- Region: Bourgogne-Franche-Comté
- Department: Doubs
- Arrondissement: Besançon
- Canton: Baume-les-Dames

Government
  - Mayor (2022–2026): Ida Jeangirard
- Area^{1}: 5.52 km^{2} (2.13 sq mi)
- Highest elevation: 481 m (1,578 ft)
- Lowest elevation: 232 m (761 ft)
- Population (2023): 200
  - Density: 36/km^{2} (94/sq mi)
- Time zone: UTC+01:00 (CET)
  - Summer (DST): UTC+02:00 (CEST)
- INSEE/Postal code: 25107 /25640
- ^{1} French Land Register data, which excludes lakes, ponds, glaciers > 1 km^{2} (0.386 sq mi or 247 acres) and river estuaries.

Cendrey (French pronunciation: [sɑ̃dʁɛ]) is a commune in the Doubs department in the Bourgogne-Franche-Comté region in eastern France. It is located close to the border with Haute-Saone, on the river Beune.

== Population ==
Historical population
Year	Pop.	±% p.a.
1968	187	—
1975	213	+1.88%
1982	203	−0.68%
1990	175	−1.84%
1999	188	+0.80%
2007	177	−0.75%
2012	184	+0.78%
2017	191	+0.75%
2023	200	+0.77%
Source: INSEE

== See also ==
- Communes of the Doubs department
