= Huanne-Montmartin =

- Commune
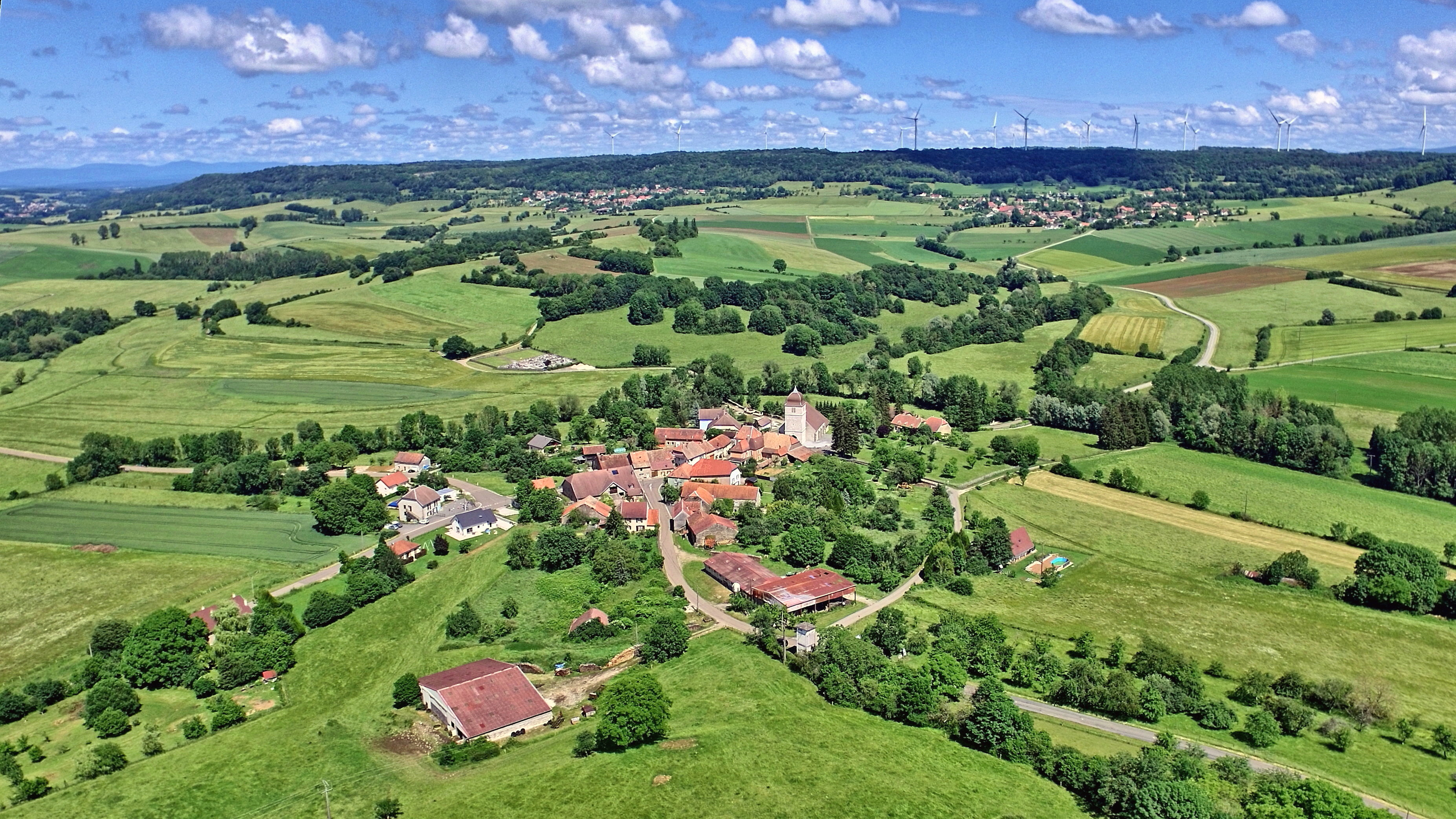
- An aerial view of Huanne
- Location of Huanne-Montmartin
- Location within France Location within Bourgogne-Franche-Comté
- Coordinates: 47°25′55″N 6°20′43″E
- Country: France
- Region: Bourgogne-Franche-Comté
- Department: Doubs
- Arrondissement: Besançon
- Canton: Baume-les-Dames

Government
  - Mayor (2022–2026): André Bouveret
- Area^{1}: 3.43 km^{2} (1.32 sq mi)
- Highest elevation: 415 m (1,362 ft)
- Lowest elevation: 283 m (928 ft)
- Population (2023): 101
  - Density: 29.4/km^{2} (76.3/sq mi)
- Time zone: UTC+01:00 (CET)
  - Summer (DST): UTC+02:00 (CEST)
- INSEE/Postal code: 25310 /25680
- ^{1} French Land Register data, which excludes lakes, ponds, glaciers > 1 km^{2} (0.386 sq mi or 247 acres) and river estuaries.

Huanne-Montmartin is a commune in the Doubs department in the Bourgogne-Franche-Comté region in eastern France.

== Population ==
Historical population
Year	Pop.	±% p.a.
1968	61	—
1975	40	−5.85%
1982	48	+2.64%
1990	70	+4.83%
1999	72	+0.31%
2007	79	+1.17%
2012	84	+1.23%
2017	87	+0.70%
2023	101	+2.52%
Source: INSEE

== See also ==
- Communes of the Doubs department
