= Rillans =

- Commune
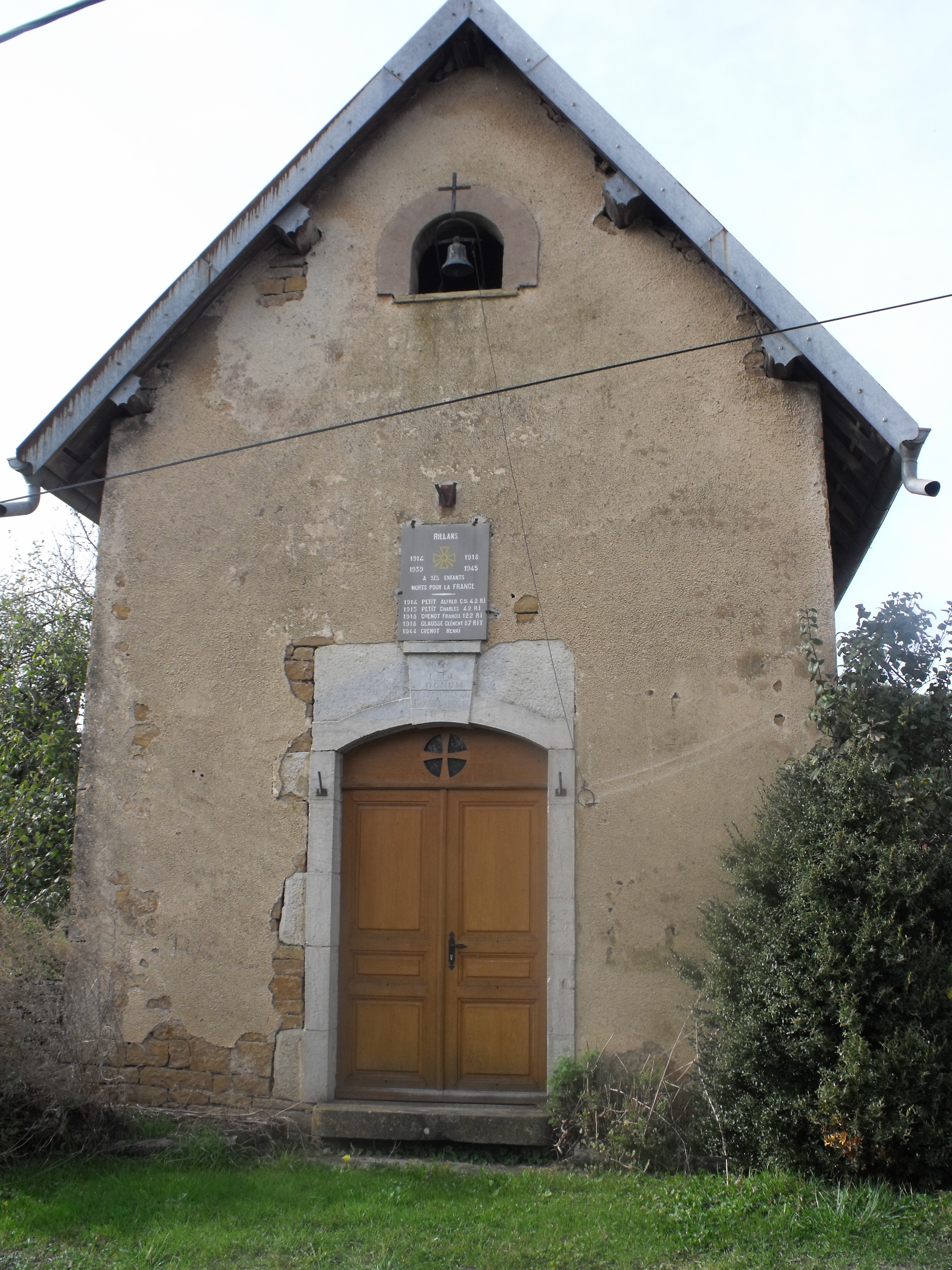
- The chapel in Rillans
- Location of Rillans
- Location within France Location within Bourgogne-Franche-Comté
- Coordinates: 47°24′50″N 6°21′53″E
- Country: France
- Region: Bourgogne-Franche-Comté
- Department: Doubs
- Arrondissement: Besançon
- Canton: Baume-les-Dames

Government
  - Mayor (2020–2026): Dominique Cour
- Area^{1}: 3.42 km^{2} (1.32 sq mi)
- Highest elevation: 473 m (1,552 ft)
- Lowest elevation: 384 m (1,260 ft)
- Population (2023): 97
  - Density: 28/km^{2} (73/sq mi)
- Time zone: UTC+01:00 (CET)
  - Summer (DST): UTC+02:00 (CEST)
- INSEE/Postal code: 25492 /25110
- ^{1} French Land Register data, which excludes lakes, ponds, glaciers > 1 km^{2} (0.386 sq mi or 247 acres) and river estuaries.

Rillans is a commune in the Doubs department in the Bourgogne-Franche-Comté region in eastern France.

== Population ==
Historical population
Year	Pop.	±% p.a.
1968	49	—
1975	48	−0.29%
1982	59	+2.99%
1990	63	+0.82%
1999	61	−0.36%
2007	79	+3.28%
2012	89	+2.41%
2017	93	+0.88%
2023	97	+0.70%
Source: INSEE

== See also ==
- Communes of the Doubs department
