= Naisey-les-Granges =

- Commune
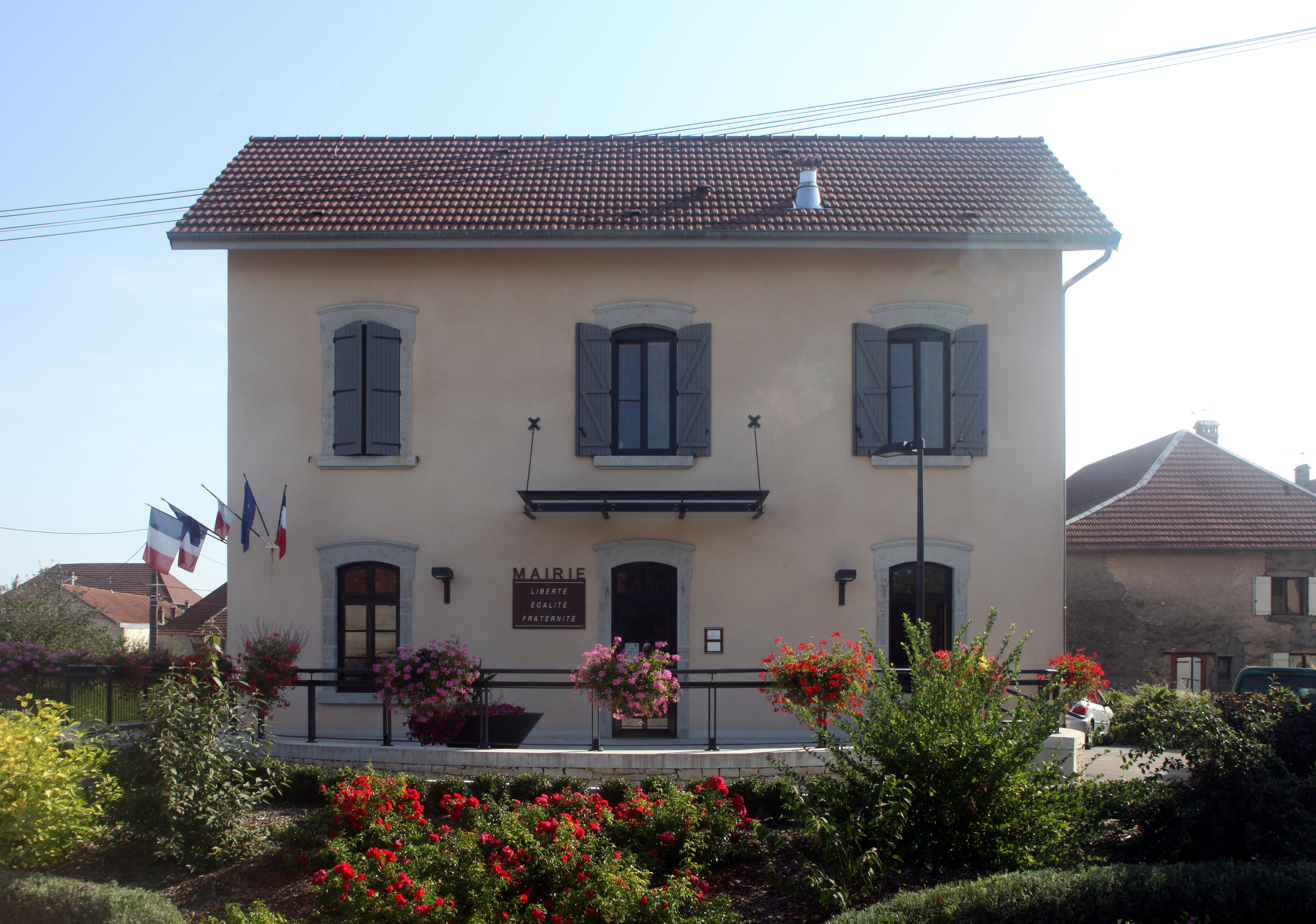
- The town hall in Naisey-les-Granges

- Coat of arms
- Location of Naisey-les-Granges
- Location within France Location within Bourgogne-Franche-Comté
- Coordinates: 47°12′45″N 6°14′15″E
- Country: France
- Region: Bourgogne-Franche-Comté
- Department: Doubs
- Arrondissement: Besançon
- Canton: Baume-les-Dames

Government
  - Mayor (2020–2026): Jacky Morel
- Area^{1}: 25.13 km^{2} (9.70 sq mi)
- Highest elevation: 734 m (2,408 ft)
- Lowest elevation: 429 m (1,407 ft)
- Population (2023): 835
  - Density: 33.2/km^{2} (86.1/sq mi)
- Time zone: UTC+01:00 (CET)
  - Summer (DST): UTC+02:00 (CEST)
- INSEE/Postal code: 25417 /25360
- ^{1} French Land Register data, which excludes lakes, ponds, glaciers > 1 km^{2} (0.386 sq mi or 247 acres) and river estuaries.

Naisey-les-Granges (French pronunciation: [nɛzɛ le ɡʁɑ̃ʒ]) is a commune in the Doubs department in the Bourgogne-Franche-Comté region in eastern France.

== Geography ==
The commune lies 18 km (11 mi) southeast of Besançon.

== Population ==
Historical population
| Year | Pop. | ±% p.a. |
|---|---|---|
| 1968 | 436 | — |
| 1975 | 442 | +0.20% |
| 1982 | 470 | +0.88% |
| 1990 | 534 | +1.61% |
| 1999 | 597 | +1.25% |
| 2007 | 694 | +1.90% |
| 2012 | 768 | +2.05% |
| 2017 | 796 | +0.72% |
| 2023 | 835 | +0.80% |
Source: INSEE

== See also ==
- Communes of the Doubs department
