= Rignosot =

- Commune
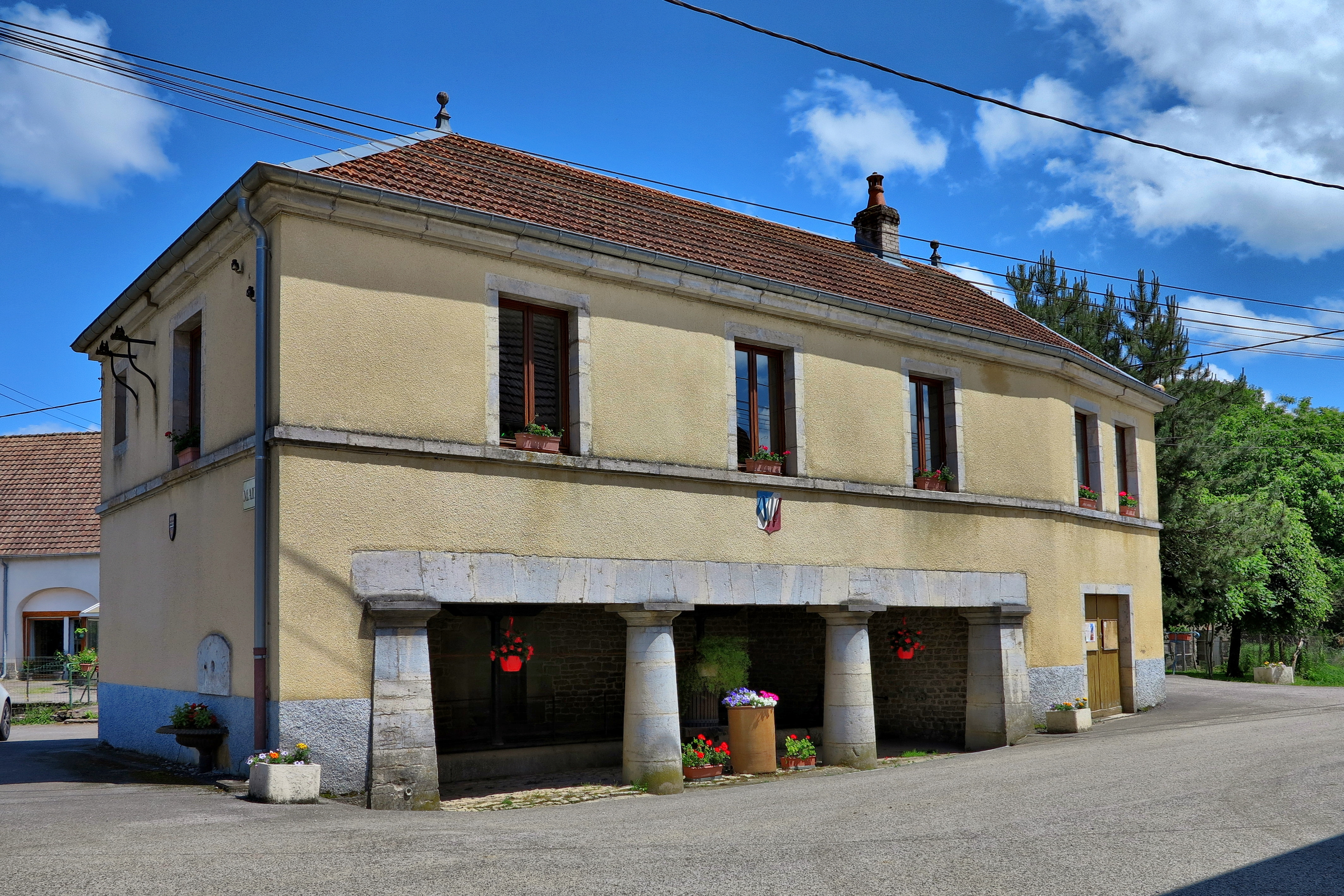
- The town hall in Rignosot
- Location of Rignosot
- Location within France Location within Bourgogne-Franche-Comté
- Coordinates: 47°23′21″N 6°11′41″E
- Country: France
- Region: Bourgogne-Franche-Comté
- Department: Doubs
- Arrondissement: Besançon
- Canton: Baume-les-Dames

Government
  - Mayor (2022–2026): Damien Moura
- Area^{1}: 3.85 km^{2} (1.49 sq mi)
- Highest elevation: 327 m (1,073 ft)
- Lowest elevation: 235 m (771 ft)
- Population (2023): 106
  - Density: 27.5/km^{2} (71.3/sq mi)
- Time zone: UTC+01:00 (CET)
  - Summer (DST): UTC+02:00 (CEST)
- INSEE/Postal code: 25491 /25640
- ^{1} French Land Register data, which excludes lakes, ponds, glaciers > 1 km^{2} (0.386 sq mi or 247 acres) and river estuaries.

Rignosot (French pronunciation: [ʁiɡnozo]) is a commune in the Doubs department in the Bourgogne-Franche-Comté region in eastern France.

== Population ==
Historical population
Year	Pop.	±% p.a.
1968	96	—
1975	96	+0.00%
1982	107	+1.56%
1990	107	+0.00%
1999	114	+0.71%
2007	119	+0.54%
2012	118	−0.17%
2017	116	−0.34%
2023	106	−1.49%
Source: INSEE

== See also ==
- Communes of the Doubs department
