= Glamondans =

- Commune
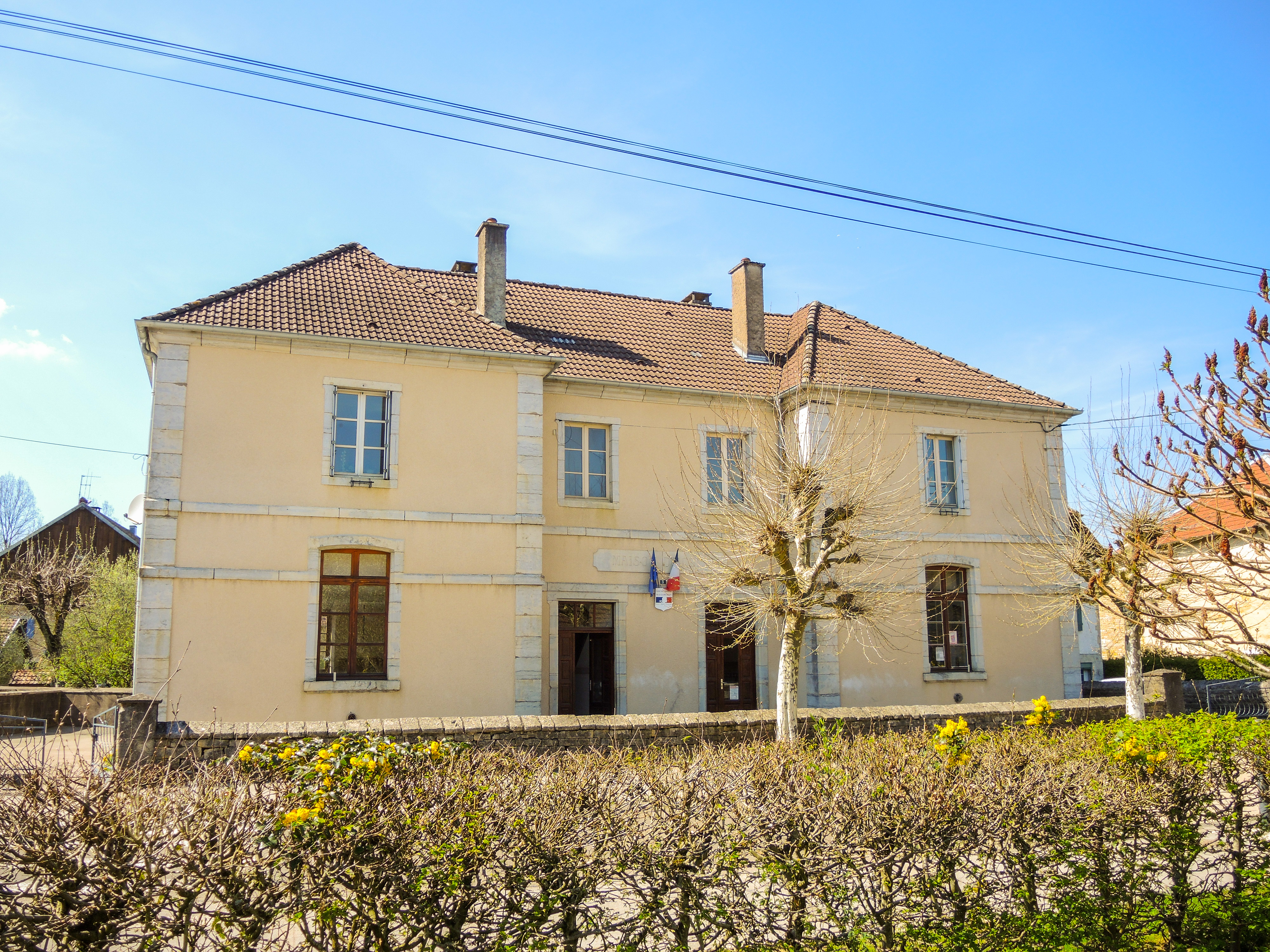
- The town hall in Glamondans

- Coat of arms
- Location of Glamondans
- Location within France Location within Bourgogne-Franche-Comté
- Coordinates: 47°15′58″N 6°16′43″E
- Country: France
- Region: Bourgogne-Franche-Comté
- Department: Doubs
- Arrondissement: Besançon
- Canton: Baume-les-Dames

Government
  - Mayor (2020–2026): Xavier Morel
- Area^{1}: 9.76 km^{2} (3.77 sq mi)
- Highest elevation: 482 m (1,581 ft)
- Lowest elevation: 389 m (1,276 ft)
- Population (2023): 195
  - Density: 20.0/km^{2} (51.7/sq mi)
- Time zone: UTC+01:00 (CET)
  - Summer (DST): UTC+02:00 (CEST)
- INSEE/Postal code: 25273 /25360
- ^{1} French Land Register data, which excludes lakes, ponds, glaciers > 1 km^{2} (0.386 sq mi or 247 acres) and river estuaries.

Glamondans (French pronunciation: [ɡlamɔ̃dɑ̃]) is a commune in the Doubs département in the region of Bourgogne-Franche-Comté in eastern France.

== Population ==
Historical population
Year	Pop.	±% p.a.
1968	173	—
1975	135	−3.48%
1982	133	−0.21%
1990	147	+1.26%
1999	153	+0.45%
2007	226	+5.00%
2012	189	−3.51%
2017	217	+2.80%
2023	195	−1.77%
Source: INSEE

== See also ==
- Communes of the Doubs department
