= Gondenans-les-Moulins =

- Commune
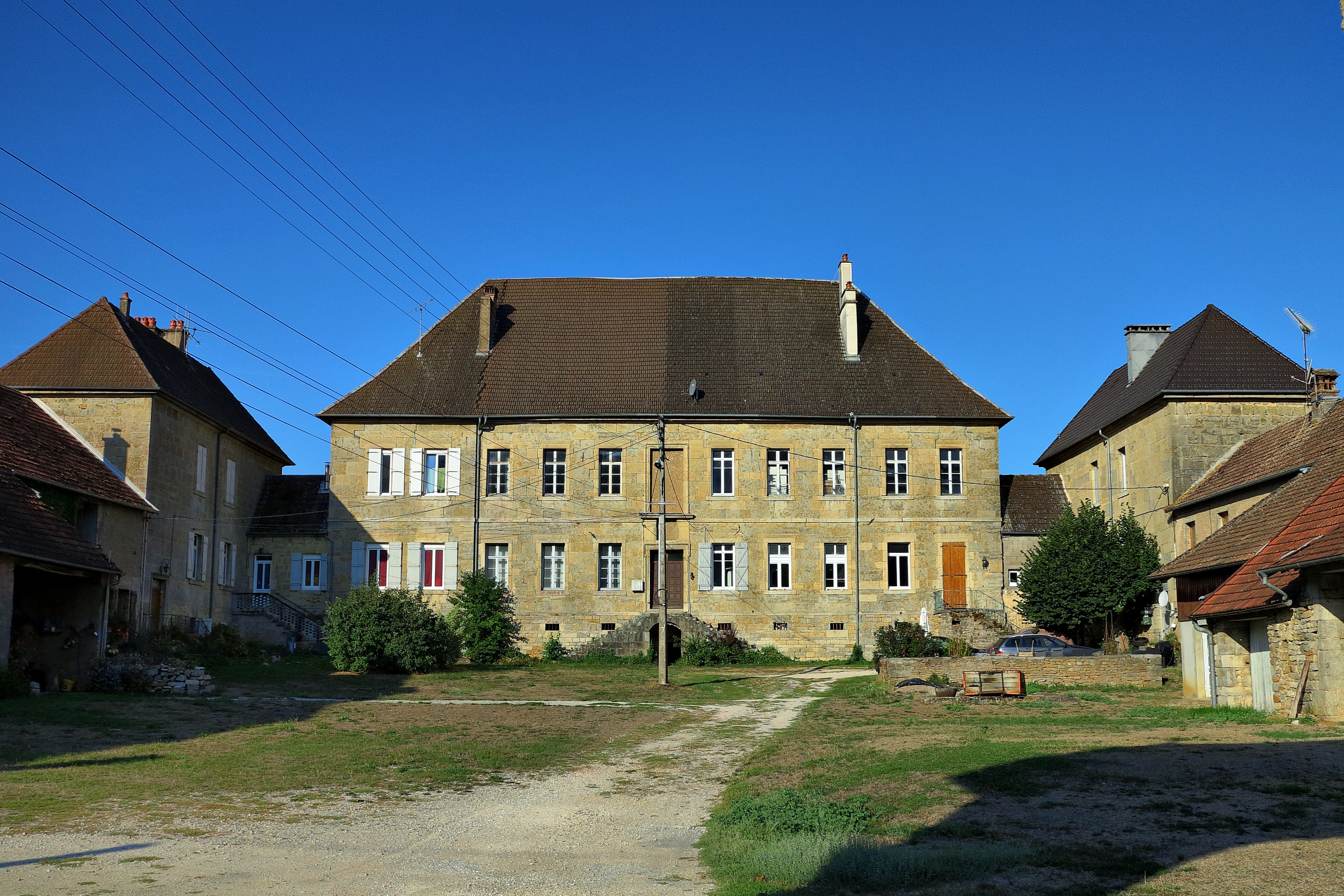
- The chateau in Gondenans-les-Moulins
- Location of Gondenans-les-Moulins
- Location within France Location within Bourgogne-Franche-Comté
- Coordinates: 47°28′13″N 6°22′57″E
- Country: France
- Region: Bourgogne-Franche-Comté
- Department: Doubs
- Arrondissement: Besançon
- Canton: Baume-les-Dames

Government
  - Mayor (2021–2026): Olivier Faivre-Pierret
- Area^{1}: 3.93 km^{2} (1.52 sq mi)
- Highest elevation: 438 m (1,437 ft)
- Lowest elevation: 259 m (850 ft)
- Population (2023): 84
  - Density: 21/km^{2} (55/sq mi)
- Time zone: UTC+01:00 (CET)
  - Summer (DST): UTC+02:00 (CEST)
- INSEE/Postal code: 25277 /25680
- ^{1} French Land Register data, which excludes lakes, ponds, glaciers > 1 km^{2} (0.386 sq mi or 247 acres) and river estuaries.

Gondenans-les-Moulins (French pronunciation: [ɡɔ̃dnɑ̃ le mulɛ̃]) is a commune in the Doubs department in the Bourgogne-Franche-Comté region in eastern France.

== Population ==
Historical population
Year	Pop.	±% p.a.
1968	58	—
1975	50	−2.10%
1982	60	+2.64%
1990	54	−1.31%
1999	59	+0.99%
2007	73	+2.70%
2012	76	+0.81%
2017	72	−1.08%
2023	84	+2.60%
Source: INSEE

== See also ==
- Communes of the Doubs department
