= Côtebrune =

- Commune
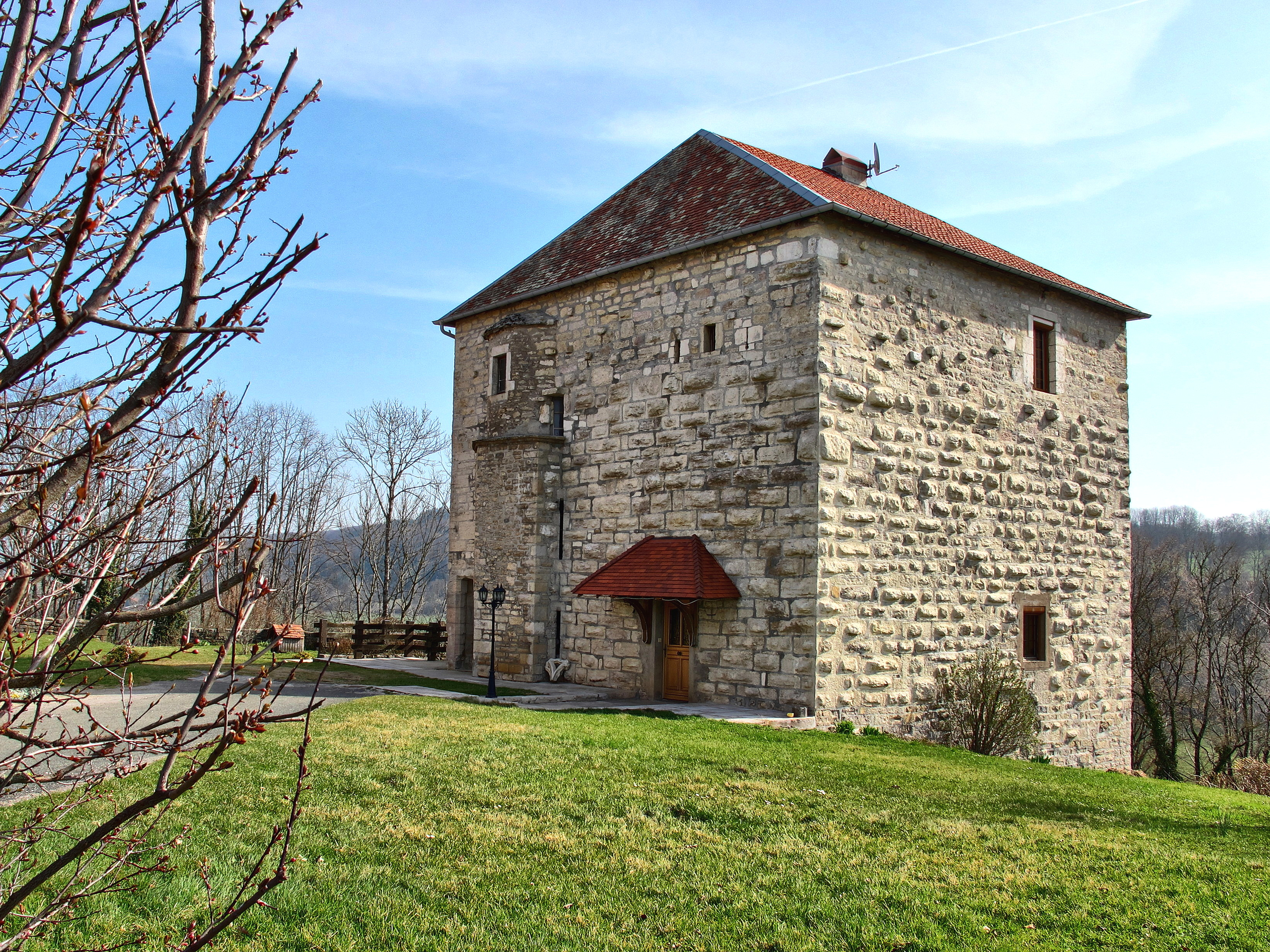
- Restored dungeon

- Coat of arms
- Location of Côtebrune
- Location within France Location within Bourgogne-Franche-Comté
- Coordinates: 47°15′18″N 6°18′47″E
- Country: France
- Region: Bourgogne-Franche-Comté
- Department: Doubs
- Arrondissement: Besançon
- Canton: Baume-les-Dames

Government
  - Mayor (2020–2026): Donat Barrand
- Area^{1}: 3.22 km^{2} (1.24 sq mi)
- Highest elevation: 584 m (1,916 ft)
- Lowest elevation: 415 m (1,362 ft)
- Population (2023): 76
  - Density: 24/km^{2} (61/sq mi)
- Time zone: UTC+01:00 (CET)
  - Summer (DST): UTC+02:00 (CEST)
- INSEE/Postal code: 25166 /25360
- ^{1} French Land Register data, which excludes lakes, ponds, glaciers > 1 km^{2} (0.386 sq mi or 247 acres) and river estuaries.

Côtebrune (French pronunciation: [kot(ə)bʁyn]) is a commune in the Doubs department in the Bourgogne-Franche-Comté region in eastern France.

== Population ==
Historical population
Year	Pop.	±% p.a.
1968	40	—
1975	36	−1.49%
1982	44	+2.91%
1990	58	+3.51%
1999	54	−0.79%
2007	68	+2.92%
2012	71	+0.87%
2017	80	+2.42%
2023	76	−0.85%
Source: INSEE

== See also ==
- Communes of the Doubs department
