= Breconchaux =

- Commune
- Location of Breconchaux
- Location within France Location within Bourgogne-Franche-Comté
- Coordinates: 47°20′28″N 6°16′02″E
- Country: France
- Region: Bourgogne-Franche-Comté
- Department: Doubs
- Arrondissement: Besançon
- Canton: Baume-les-Dames

Government
  - Mayor (2020–2026): Jean-Louis Faivre-Pierret
- Area^{1}: 3.26 km^{2} (1.26 sq mi)
- Highest elevation: 400 m (1,300 ft)
- Lowest elevation: 330 m (1,080 ft)
- Population (2023): 85
  - Density: 26/km^{2} (68/sq mi)
- Time zone: UTC+01:00 (CET)
  - Summer (DST): UTC+02:00 (CEST)
- INSEE/Postal code: 25088 /25640
- ^{1} French Land Register data, which excludes lakes, ponds, glaciers > 1 km^{2} (0.386 sq mi or 247 acres) and river estuaries.

Breconchaux (French pronunciation: [bʁəkɔ̃ʃo]) is a commune in the Doubs department in the Bourgogne-Franche-Comté region in eastern France.

== Population ==
Historical population
Year	Pop.	±% p.a.
1968	46	—
1975	38	−2.69%
1982	62	+7.24%
1990	66	+0.78%
1999	68	+0.33%
2007	84	+2.68%
2012	93	+2.06%
2017	93	+0.00%
2023	85	−1.49%
Source: INSEE

== See also ==
- Communes of the Doubs department
