= Viéthorey =

- Commune
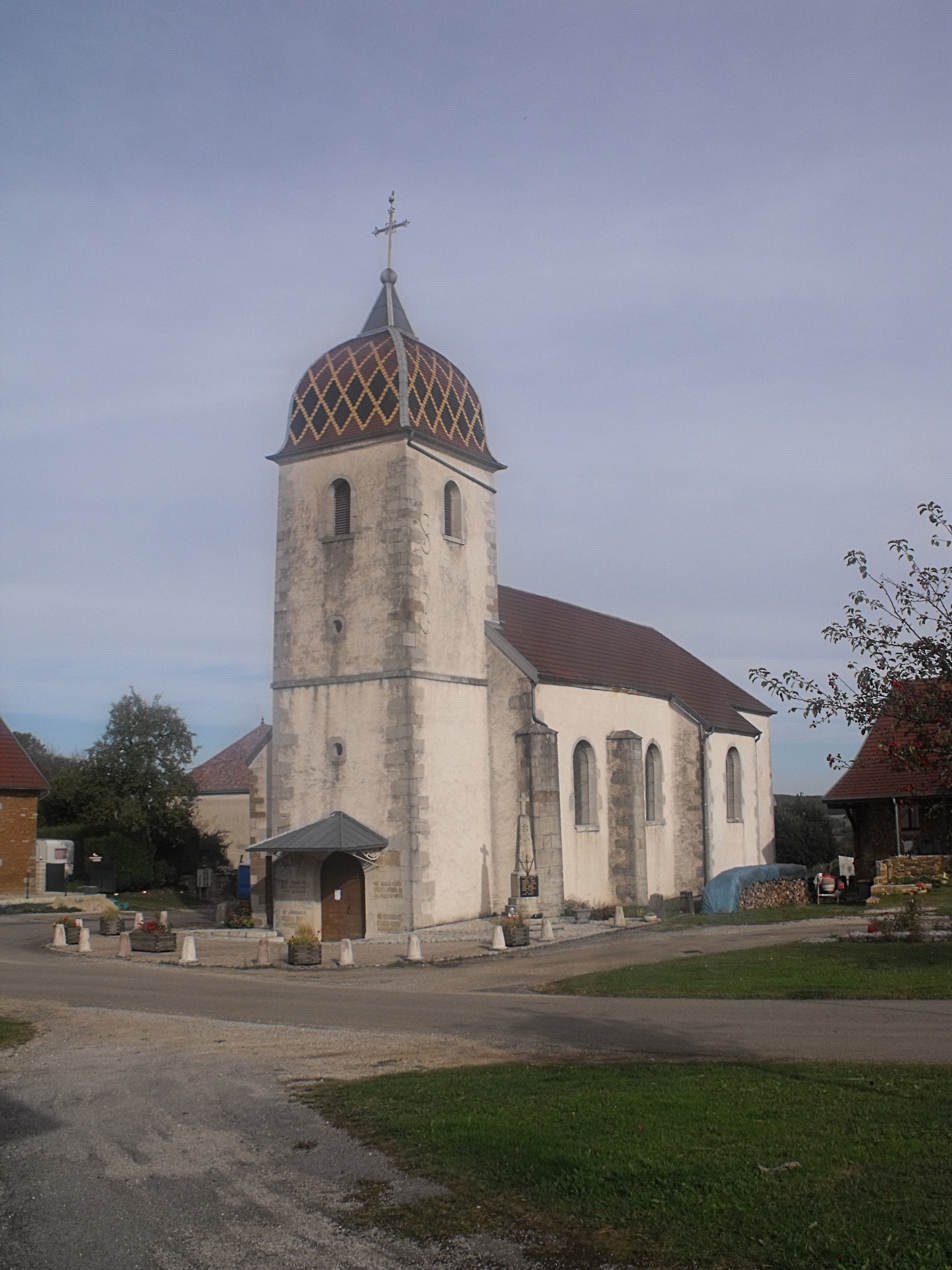
- The church in Viéthorey
- Location of Viéthorey
- Location within France Location within Bourgogne-Franche-Comté
- Coordinates: 47°25′34″N 6°25′49″E
- Country: France
- Region: Bourgogne-Franche-Comté
- Department: Doubs
- Arrondissement: Besançon
- Canton: Baume-les-Dames

Government
  - Mayor (2020–2026): Michel Gonin
- Area^{1}: 7.92 km^{2} (3.06 sq mi)
- Highest elevation: 494 m (1,621 ft)
- Lowest elevation: 384 m (1,260 ft)
- Population (2023): 86
  - Density: 11/km^{2} (28/sq mi)
- Time zone: UTC+01:00 (CET)
  - Summer (DST): UTC+02:00 (CEST)
- INSEE/Postal code: 25613 /25340
- ^{1} French Land Register data, which excludes lakes, ponds, glaciers > 1 km^{2} (0.386 sq mi or 247 acres) and river estuaries.

Viéthorey (French pronunciation: [vjetɔʁɛ]) is a commune in the Doubs department in the Bourgogne-Franche-Comté region in eastern France.

== Population ==
Historical population
Year	Pop.	±% p.a.
1968	159	—
1975	144	−1.41%
1982	107	−4.15%
1990	109	+0.23%
1999	105	−0.41%
2007	127	+2.41%
2012	112	−2.48%
2017	94	−3.44%
2023	86	−1.47%
Source: INSEE

== See also ==
- Communes of the Doubs department
