= Avanne-Aveney =

- Commune
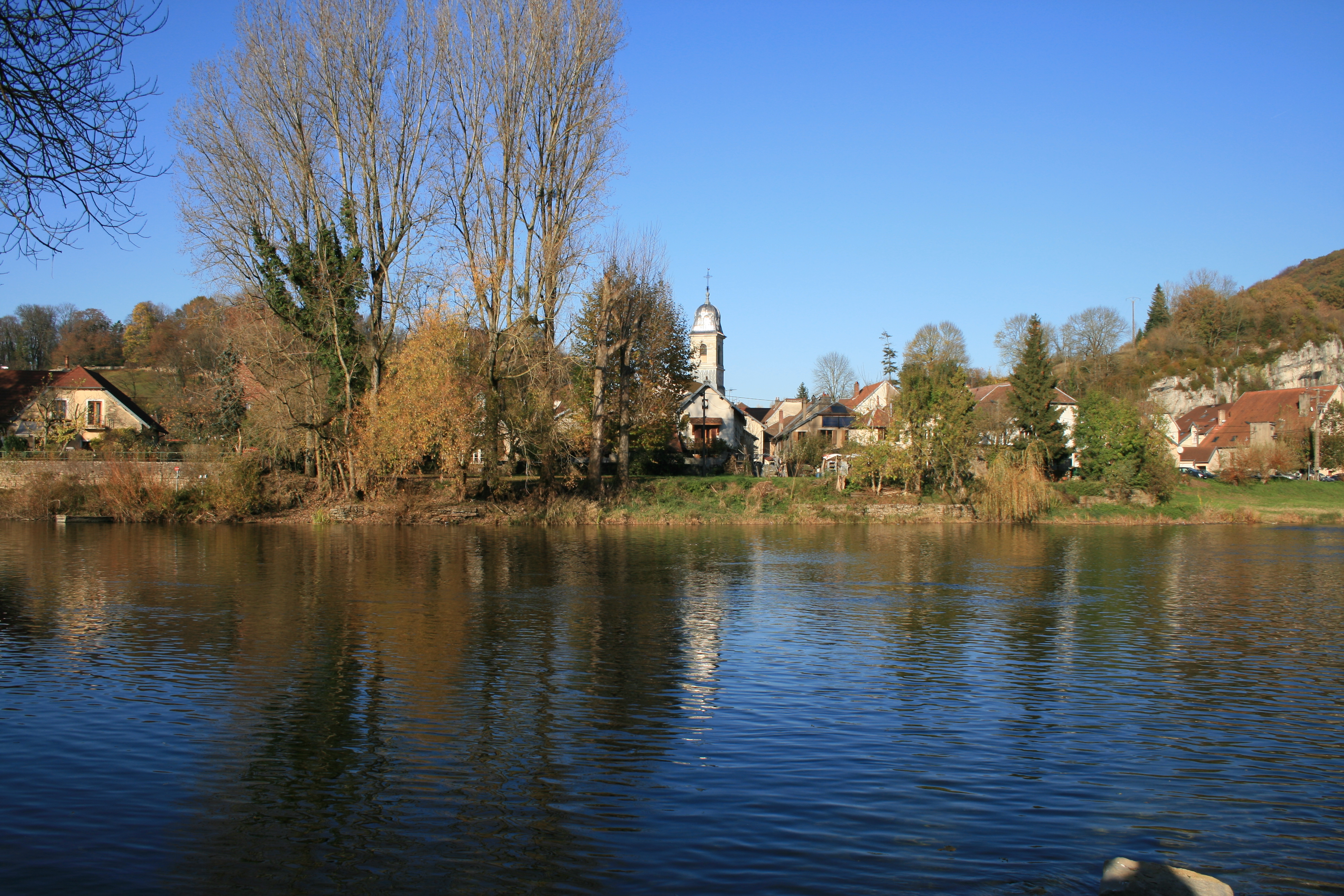
- View of Avanne from the left bank of the Doubs

- Coat of arms
- Location of Avanne-Aveney
- Location within France Location within Bourgogne-Franche-Comté
- Coordinates: 47°12′10″N 5°57′54″E
- Country: France
- Region: Bourgogne-Franche-Comté
- Department: Doubs
- Arrondissement: Besançon
- Canton: Besançon-1
- Intercommunality: Grand Besançon Métropole

Government
  - Mayor (2020–2026): Marie-Jeanne Bernabeu
- Area^{1}: 8.62 km^{2} (3.33 sq mi)
- Highest elevation: 493 m (1,617 ft)
- Lowest elevation: 228 m (748 ft)
- Population (2023): 2,256
  - Density: 262/km^{2} (678/sq mi)
- Time zone: UTC+01:00 (CET)
  - Summer (DST): UTC+02:00 (CEST)
- INSEE/Postal code: 25036 /25720
- ^{1} French Land Register data, which excludes lakes, ponds, glaciers > 1 km^{2} (0.386 sq mi or 247 acres) and river estuaries.

Avanne-Aveney (French pronunciation: [avan avnɛ]) is a commune in the Doubs department in the Bourgogne-Franche-Comté region of eastern France.

The inhabitants of the commune are known as Avannais or Avannaises.

== Geography ==
Avanne-Aveney is located to the immediate south-west of Besançon with the town of Avanne joined to the Besançon urban area. The smaller town of Aveney is on the opposite bank of the river linked by a bridge. Access to the commune is by the D106 from Besançon which continues west to Grandfontaine. Route nationale N83 passes through the south-east of the commune from Beure in the north-east to Samson in the south. The D367 links Avanne to Aveney via a bridge across the river. The west and the east of the commune have extensive forests and the two villages have a substantial urban area leaving a small amount of land as farmland.

The Doubs river flows through the south-east of the commune as it flows south-west to join the Saône at Verdun-sur-le-Doubs.

== Toponymy ==
Two propositions exist for the origin of the name of the commune. According to some linguists Avanne takes its name from the Latin avena meaning "oats" and, by extension, poor ground. For others, the name is from the Gallic abona meaning "river".

== History ==
=== Antiquity ===
The occupation of the site in Gallo-Roman times is attested by the discovery of remains of a building in the north of the commune on Rue des Combots when the construction of the Grands Prés housing estate in the 1970s was finished. Unfortunately this was not reported at the time so these remains have not been studied except from the descriptions. A hypocaust, suggesting the existence of a Roman villa, was located on Rue des Blotets.

=== Ancient Times ===
The Lordship of Avanne was attested in 1092 and was dependent from the beginning on the lords of Montfaucon and the Counts of Burgundy. In the 12th century the lords of Faucogney had rights which they yielded in 1280 to the Count of Burgundy. The lordship then returned to the lords of Faucogney in the 14th century, then to the Dukes of Aumont in the 15th century which they kept until 1723. It was then owned by the Pourcheresse de Fraisans family.

=== Genealogy of the house of Avanne ===
The Chateau of Avanne, which was located on the border of the territory of Besançon, was owned by the lords of that name. It appears that this house was then passed to the lords of Faucogney: Gislebert de Faucogney, lord of Avanne, in 1180, gave land planted in vines and the use of his forests to the Abbey of Notre-Dame de Billon. This gift was confirmed by Aymé de Faucogney. Guy d'Avanne had already affixed his name to the donation made by Archbishop Hugh III to the Church of Sainte-Madeleine of Besançon in 1092. Hugues d'Avanne was cited in a title of Billon in 1163. Renaud d'Avanne, canon of Sainte-Madeleine, in 1189, gave a one third part of the Avanne Mill to the church. Thibaud d'Avanne, canon and cantor of the same church, in 1246 ceded to his chapter the share that he had in his kiln, called Kiln of Seet typochal, located at Charmont.

Hugues d'Avanne, knight, gave a meix (Note: An ancient custom: the home of a farmer together with much of the land it takes to feed and care for him) located at the village of Estu to the abbey of Saint-Paul de Besançon. He was the father of Jean and Etienne who were mentioned in the will of their uncle Thibaud. Jean d'Avanne, knight, in 1246 approved the donation of the Charmont kiln made to the Chapter of Sainte-Madeleine by his brother. His son, Peter, was a Gentleman and he married Oudette, daughter of Raoul de Saint-Sevigne, knight. In 1287 Aymé d'Avanne, son of Thibaud d'Avanne, Gentleman, agreed to sell a vineyard at Étiennette created by Lambert d'Avanne, a citizen of Besançon.

The current commune of Avanne-Aveney is the result of the merger of the communes of Avanne and Aveney, at first as an Association in 1973 then a full merger in 2004.

Vineyards have long been a major resource in Avanne, especially until the 18th century. There are still many traces of the past with old houses equipped with wine cellars. Originally a ferry connected the two villages but it was replaced by a metal bridge in 1893.

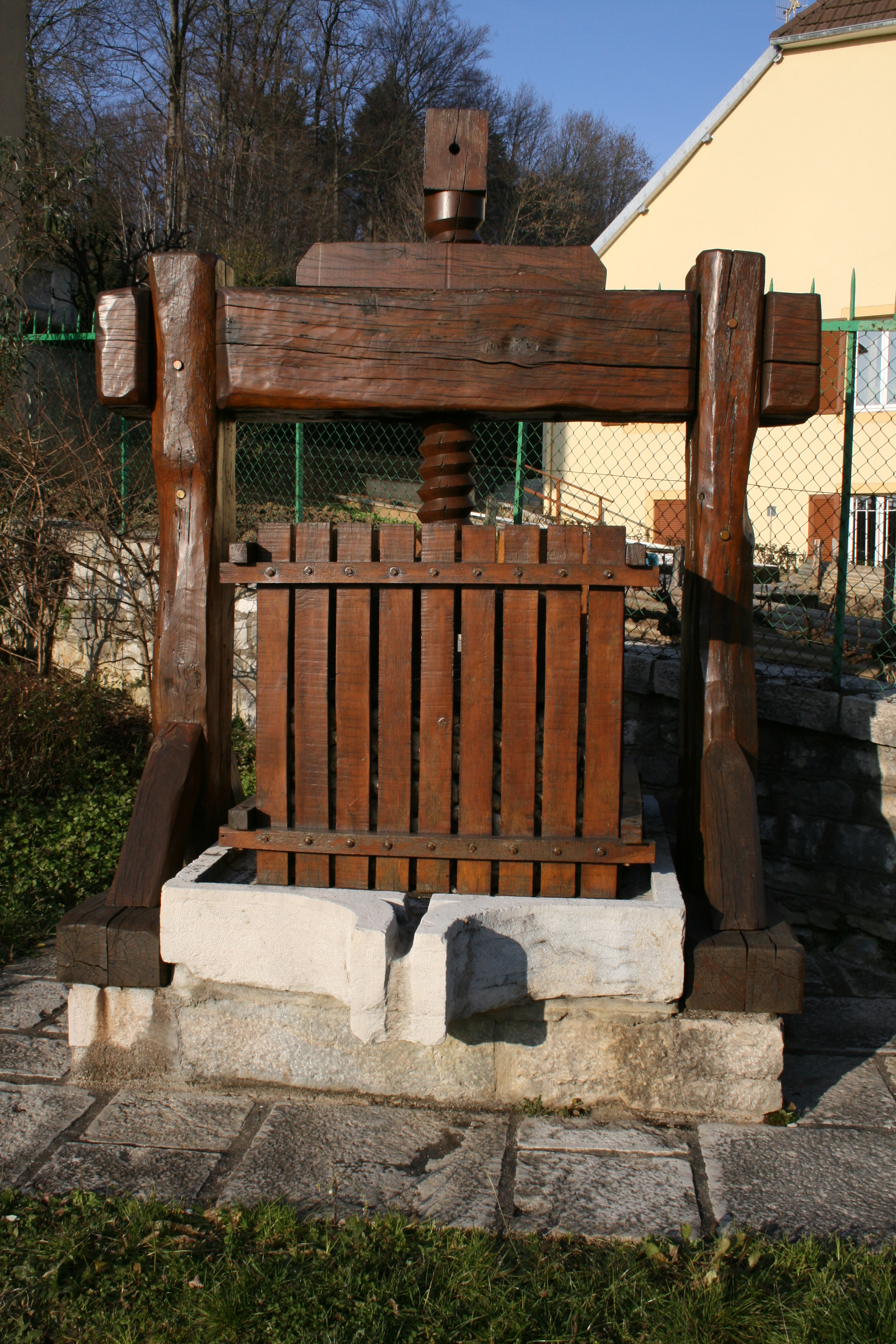
Old wine press.

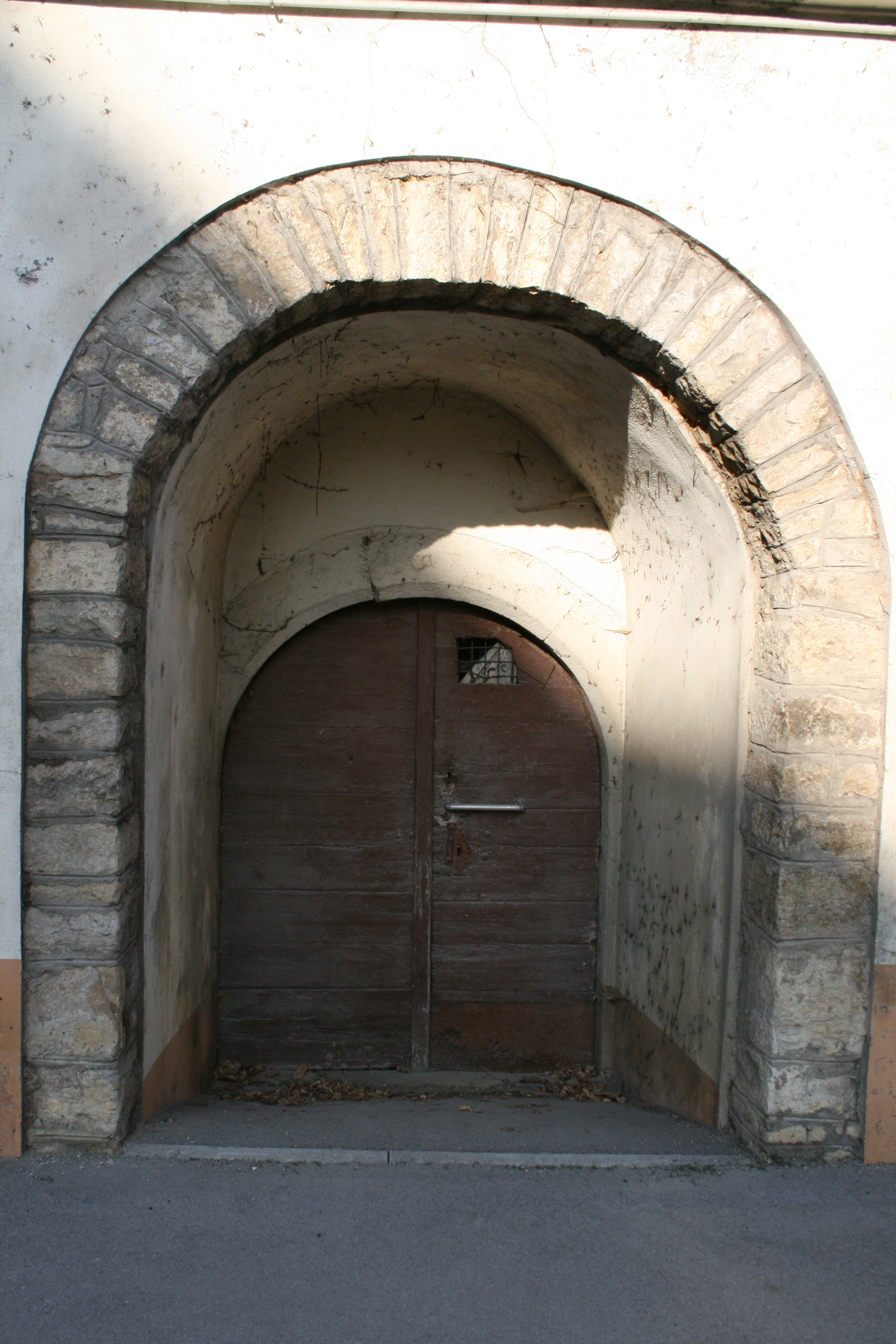
Old wine cellar.

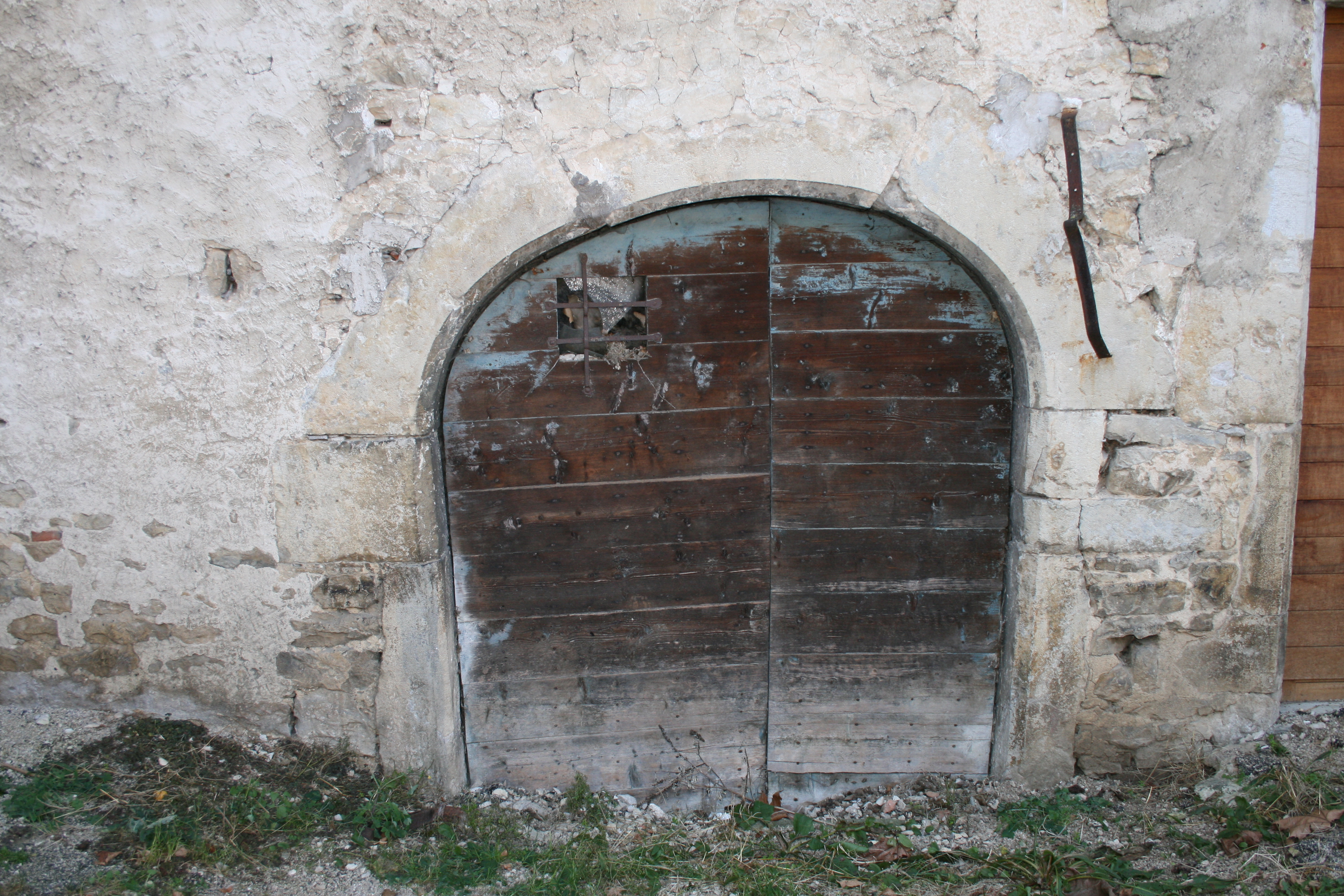
Old wine cellar.

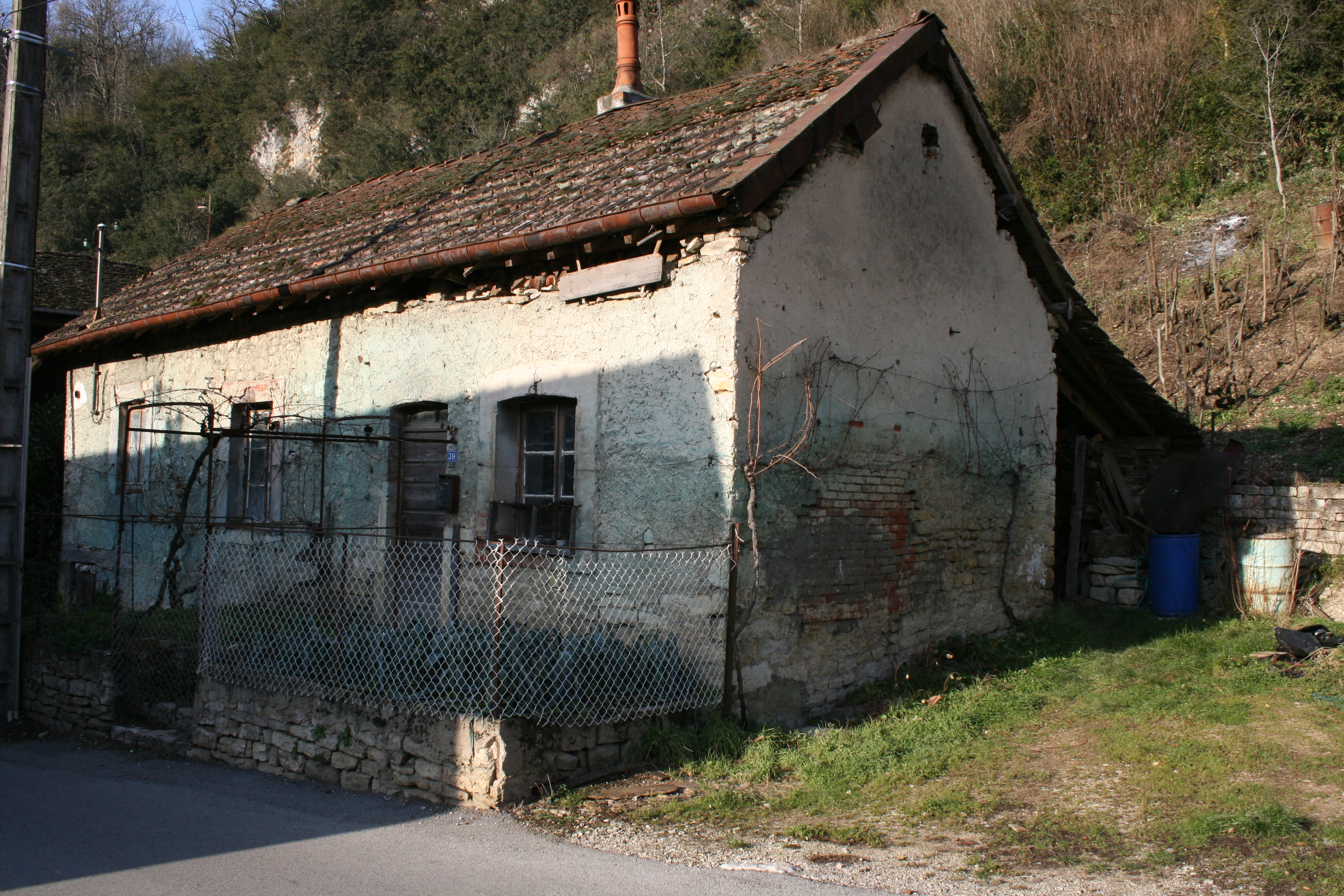
Old wine-growers house.

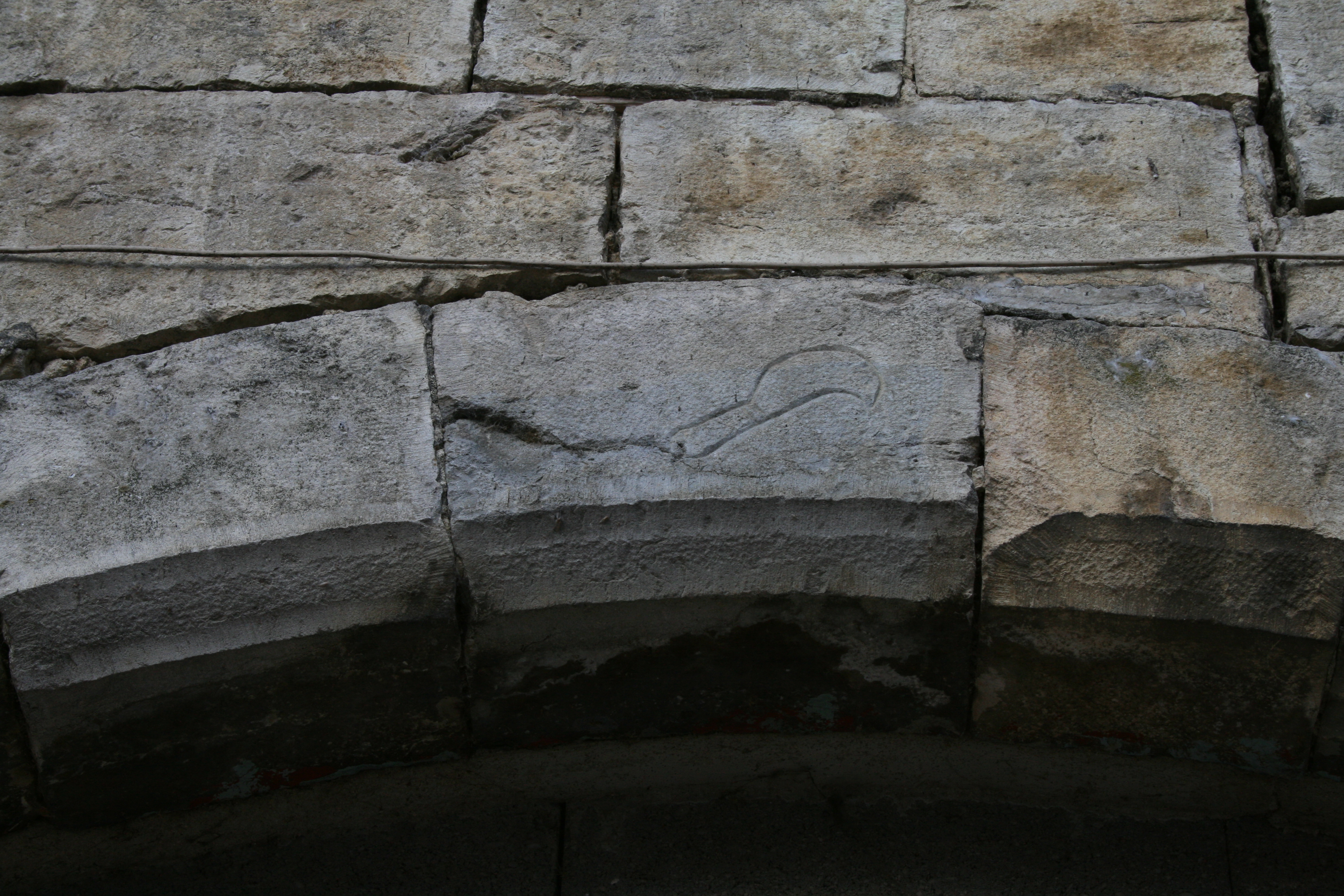
The name Serpe engraved on a lintel.

=== Heraldry ===
Arms of Avanne-Aveney	Blazon: Or, three cinquefoils Gules 2 and 1.

== Administration ==
List of Successive Mayors

Mayors from 1894 to 1973

From	To	Name	Commune
1894	1941	Léon Dony	Avanne
	1904	Virgile Bart	Aveney
1904	1911	Léon Niess	Aveney
1911	1912	Edouard Grappey	Aveney
1912	1912	Virgile Bart	Aveney
1912	1919	Jean-Baptiste Vauthier	Aveney
1919	1921	Paul Chevry	Aveney
1921	1925	Charles Guy	Aveney
1925	1925	Paul Chevry	Aveney
1925	1925	Arthur Hugues	Aveney
1925	1928	Louis Vauthier	Aveney
1928	1931	Paul Chevry	Aveney
1931	1943	Victor Paillard	Aveney
1941	1942	Hilaire Hansmannel	Avanne
1942	1945	Paul Byot	Avanne
1943	1953	Fernand Lanfrey	Aveney
1945	1953	Henri Maître	Avanne
1953	1968	Henri Marchal	Aveney
1953	1956	Jean Bichet	Avanne
1956	1965	Marcel Dufay	Avanne
1965	1973	Ivan de Maistre	Avanne
1968	1973	Georges Marguier	Aveney

Mayors from 1973

From	To	Name
1973	1977	Ivan de Maistre
1977	1995	Yves Frechin
1995	1997	Gerard Tattu
1997	2014	Jean-Pierre Taillard
2014	2020	Alain Paris
2020	2026	Marie-Jeanne Bernabeu

== Demography ==
Prior to 1973 the population figures shown include both the former communes of Avanne and Aveney.

Historical population

Year	Pop.	±% p.a.
1793	597	—
1800	638	+0.95%
1806	710	+1.80%
1821	653	−0.56%
1831	847	+2.64%
1836	864	+0.40%
1841	868	+0.09%
1846	837	−0.72%
1851	801	−0.88%
1856	765	−0.92%
1861	748	−0.45%
1866	769	+0.56%
1872	685	−1.91%
1876	667	−0.66%
1881	657	−0.30%
1886	660	+0.09%
1891	595	−2.05%
1896	562	−1.13%
1901	551	−0.39%

Year	Pop.	±% p.a.
1906	552	+0.04%
1911	546	−0.22%
1921	445	−2.02%
1926	429	−0.73%
1931	466	+1.67%
1936	483	+0.72%
1946	532	+0.97%
1954	624	+2.01%
1962	735	+2.07%
1968	899	+3.41%
1975	1,374	+6.25%
1982	1,826	+4.15%
1990	1,870	+0.30%
1999	1,903	+0.19%
2007	2,336	+2.60%
2012	2,317	−0.16%
2017	2,255	−0.54%
2023	2,256	+0.01%

Source: EHESS and INSEE

== Culture and heritage ==
=== Civil heritage ===
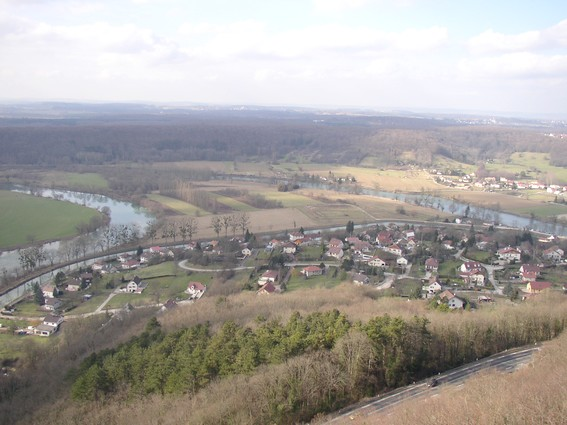
View of Aveney and the Doubs loop.

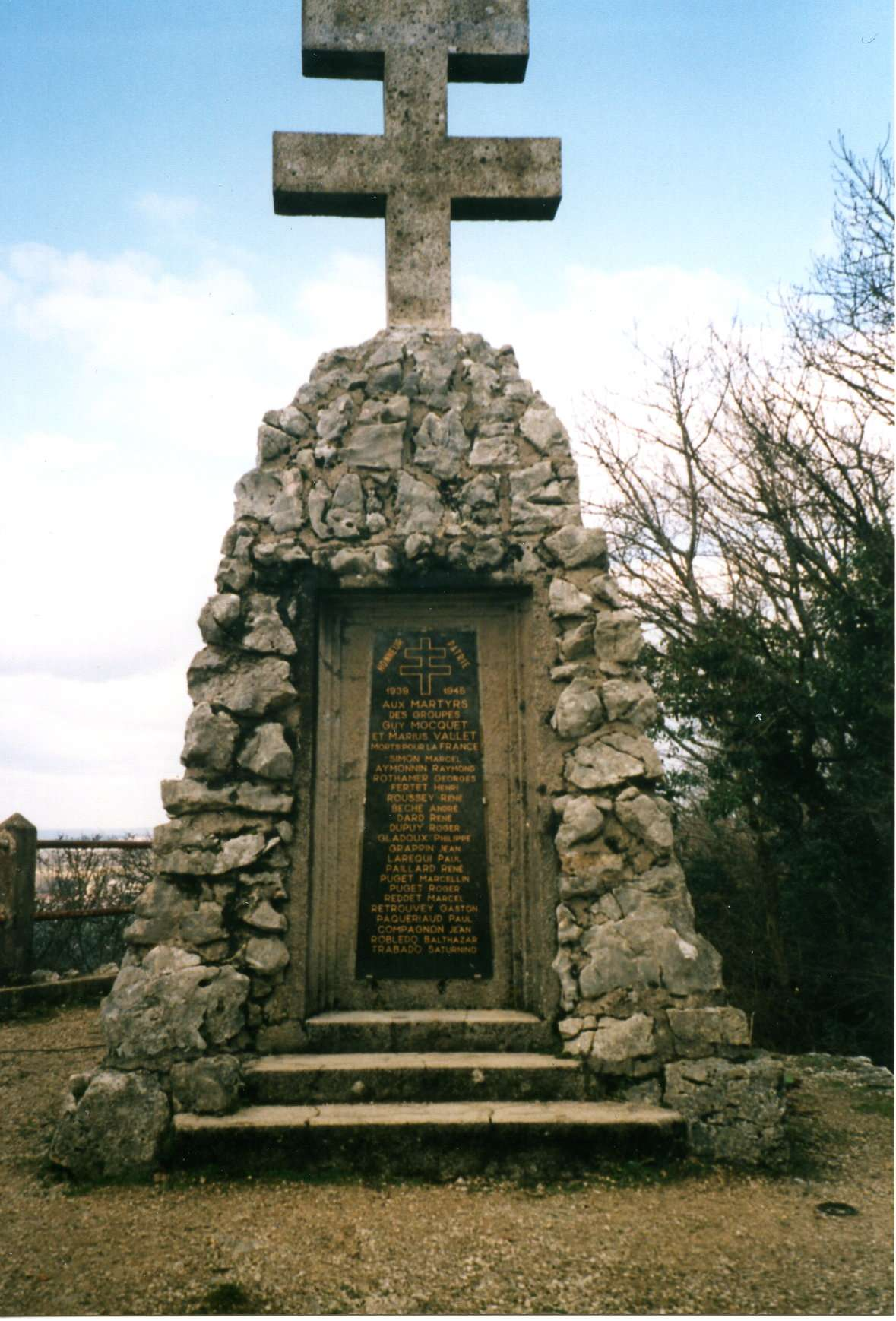
Stele on the Valmy rock.

The commune has one site that is registered as an historical monument:

- An Ornamental Garden (1851) in the Chateau of Avanne park.

Other points of interest

- Several viewing points from the Valmy rock and the Martelin cave with magnificent views of the Doubs loop and the banks of the Doubs over 6 km.
- At the Valmy Rock stands a monument to the memory of the martyrs of the Guy Mocquet and the Marius Vallet resistance fighter groups who were shot at the Citadel of Besançon on 26 September 1943 or died in deportation.
- The Bridge, built in 1893, is a bridge originally intended to carry a railway line at another site that was bought by the communes Avanne and Aveney to replace the ferry that used to link the two villages. This is one of the few bridges that was not destroyed during World War II. It allowed the passage of the Allied armies in September 1944 and was for this reason called The Liberator. It was completely renovated in 2000 and doubled with a walkway.
- The Chateau of Avanne whose history is closely linked to that of the lords and nobles of Montferrand from the 13th to the 15th century and affiliated to the County of Burgundy. It became part of a series of fortifications which included those of Montferrand-le-Château, Thoraise, Torpes, Corcondray, and Fourg. It was built in 1280 on top of the cliff which overlooks the Grande Rue. It was probably destroyed by the armies of Louis XI when they conquered the County after the death of Charles the Bold in 1477. The last tower collapsed in 1816. Only a few stairs, a wall, and some foundations remain of this chateau.

=== Religious heritage ===
The commune has one religious building that is registered as an historical monument:

- The Church of Avanne (1826) is the work of architect Pierre Marnotte. This building was a joint production of the two unmerged communes at the time. The Church contains one item that is registered as an historical object:
  - A Statue: Saint Vernier (19th century)

== Photo gallery ==
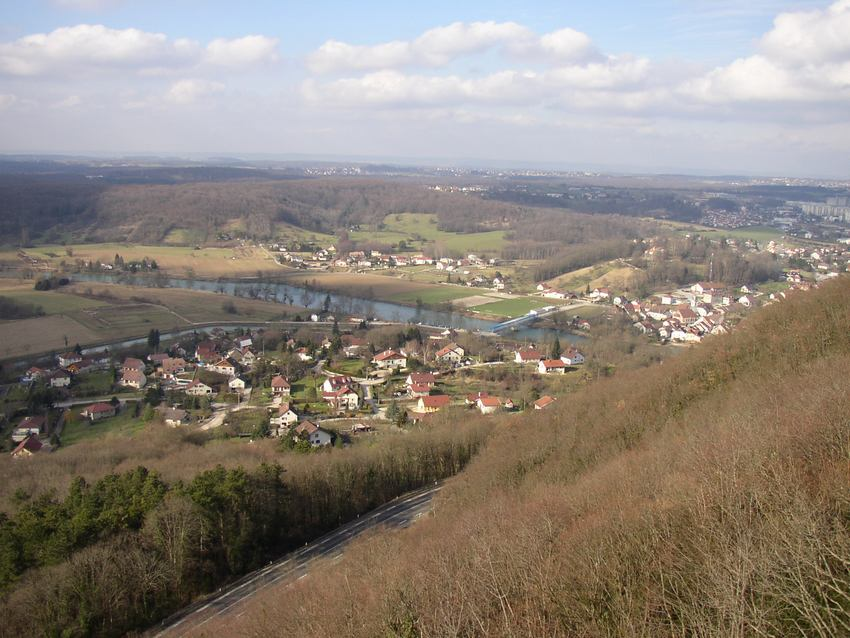
View of the two villages.

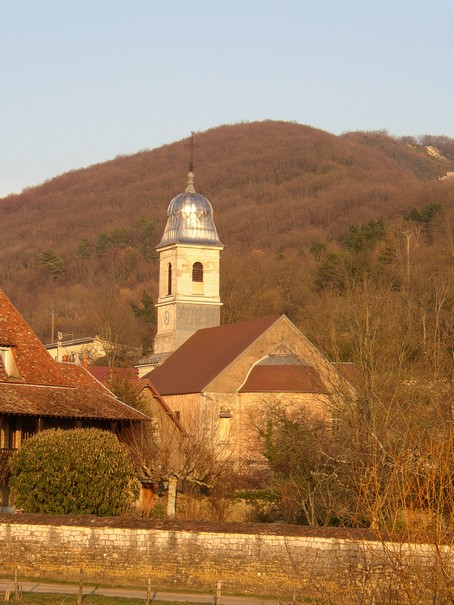
The church viewed from the bridge.

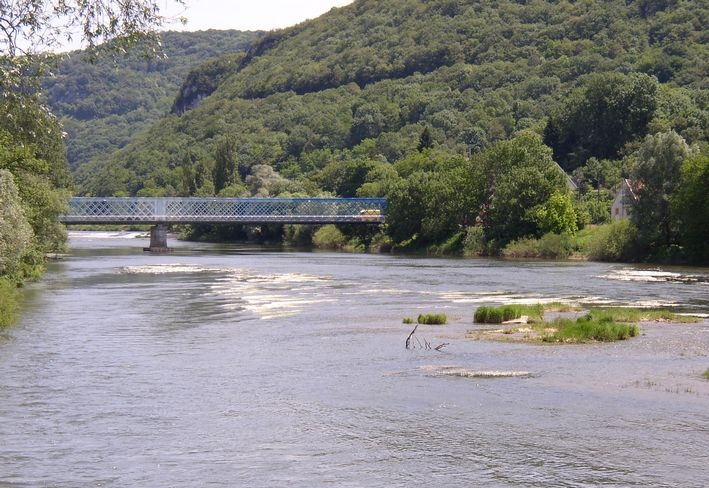
The bridge over the Doubs.

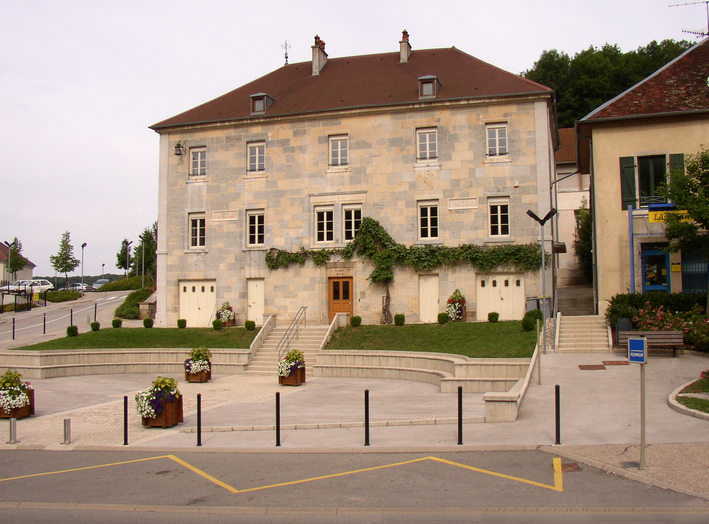
The Town Hall.

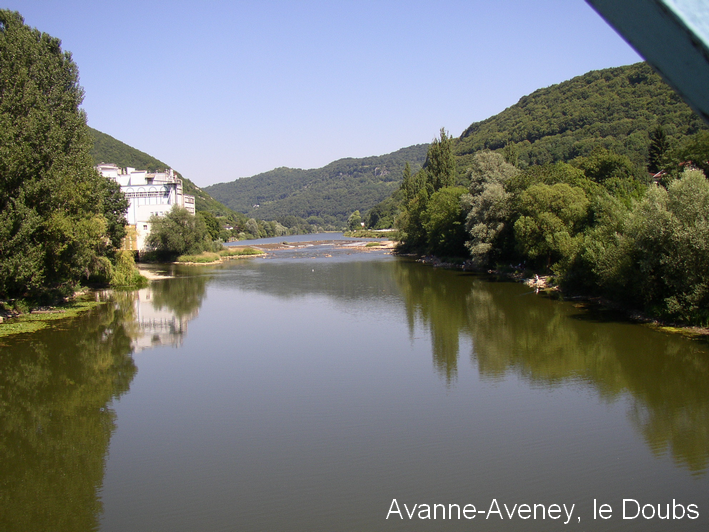
View of the Doubs and the Mill.

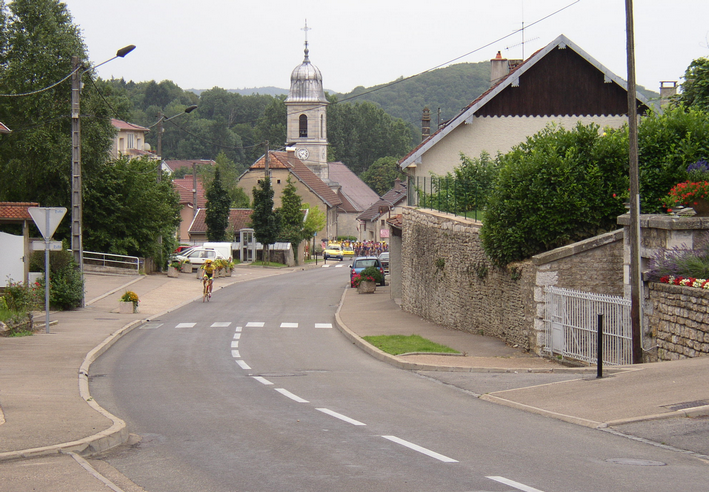
The Rue de l'Église.

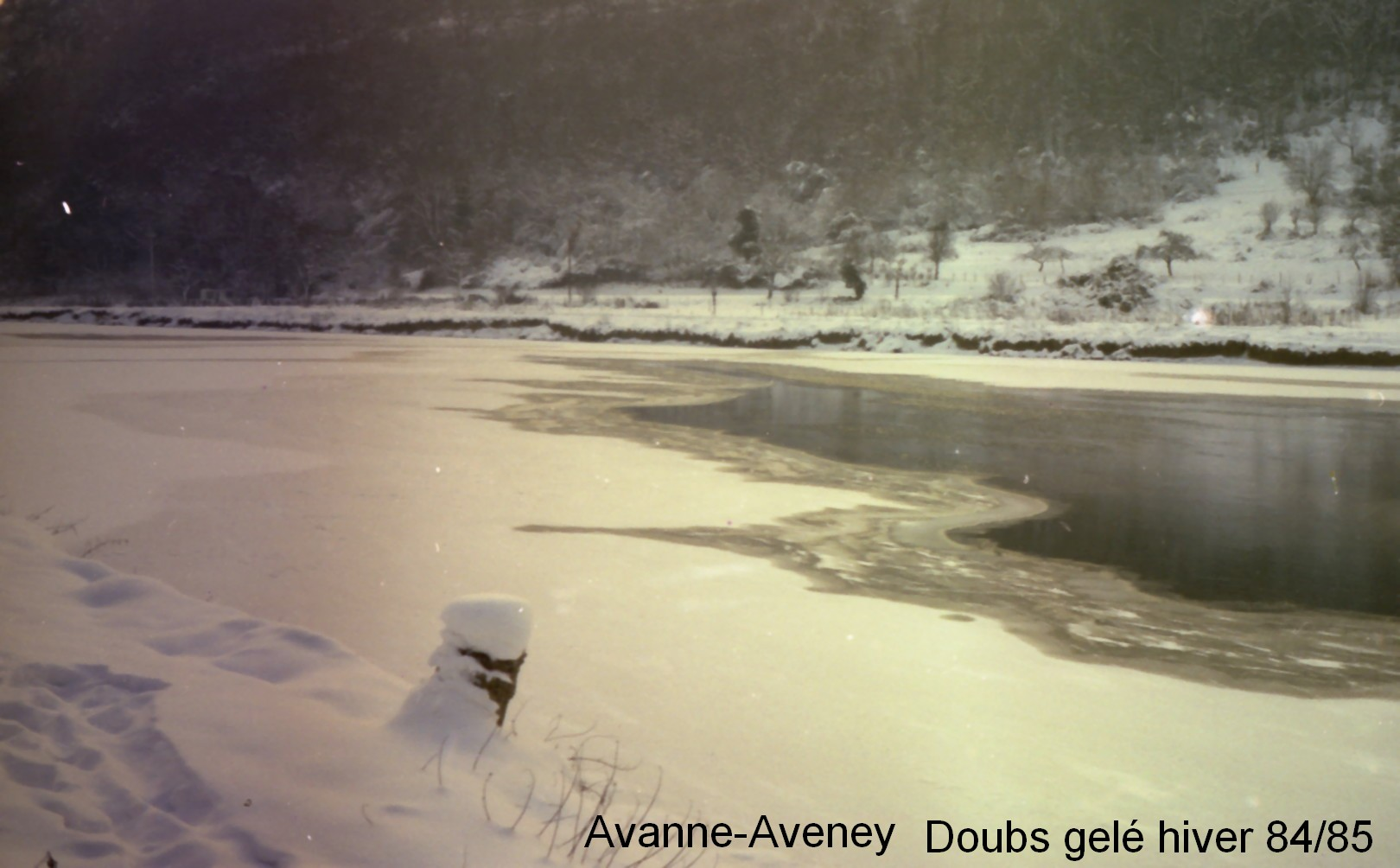
The Doubs covered in ice.

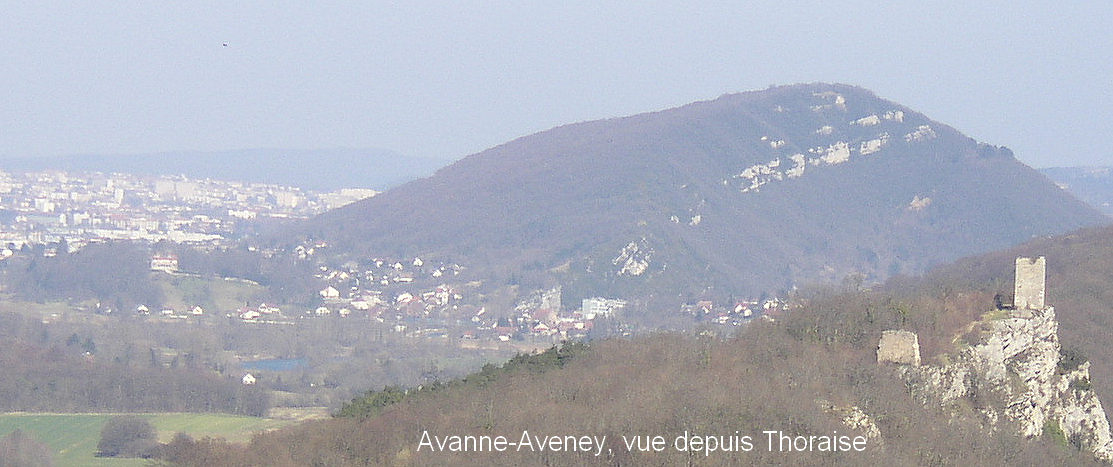
View of the village from Thoraise.

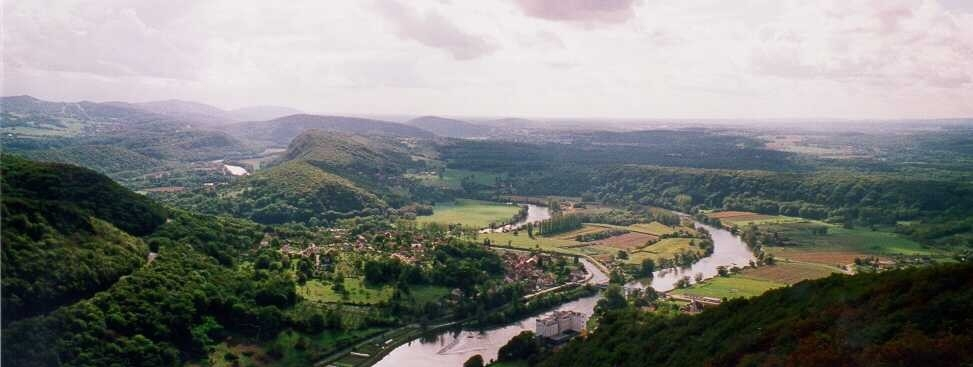
View of the village from the Planoise Fort.

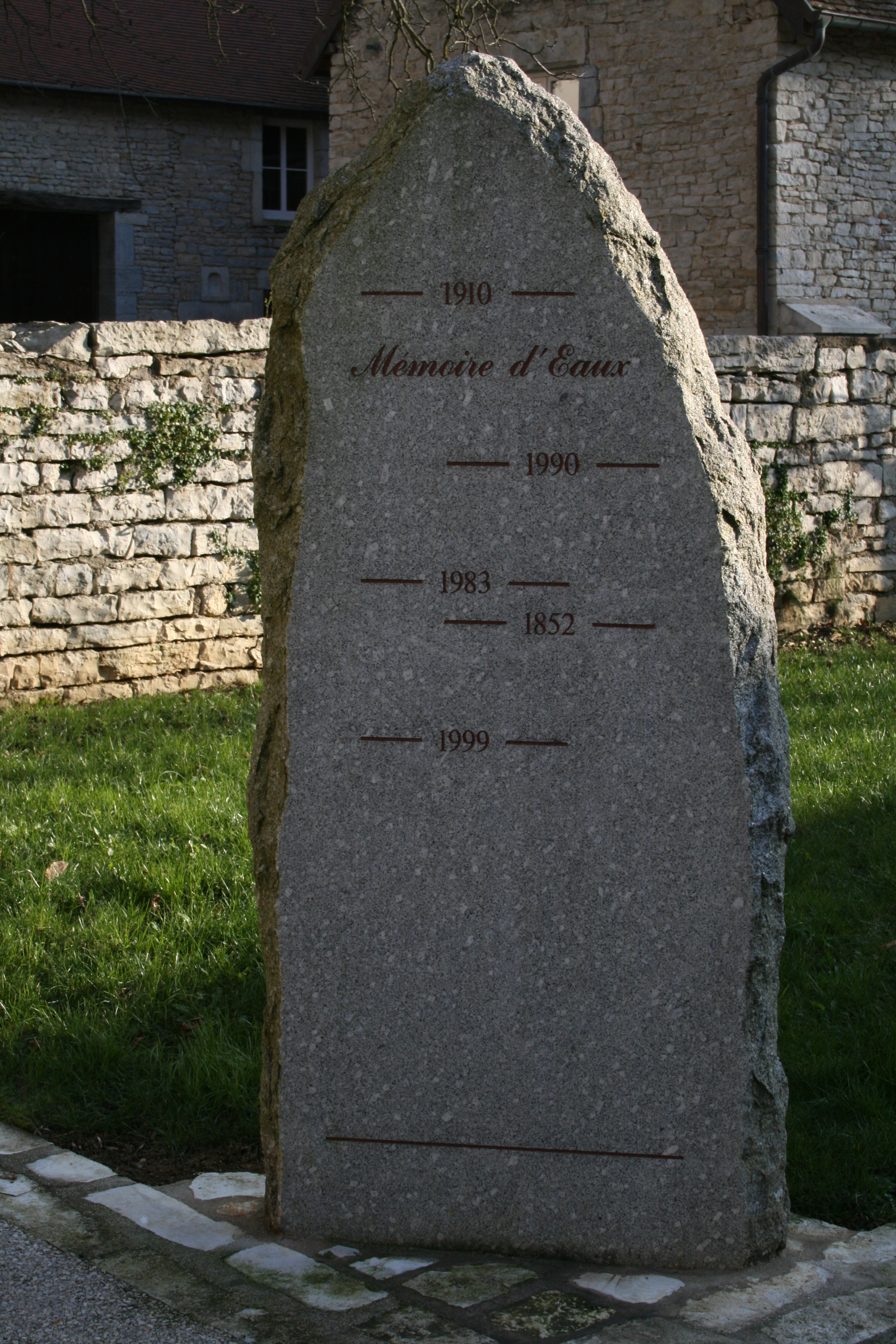
Memorial to floods on the Doubs.

== Notable people linked to the commune ==
- Alexandre Verdel, local bard, author of a song La Cancoillotte.
- Monseigneur Léon Aimé Taverdet, Bishop of Langres from 1981 to 2000.
- René Paillard, resistance fighter, member of the Guy Mocquet group, shot at the Citadel of Besançon on 26 September 1943.

== See also ==
- Communes of the Doubs department

== Notes and references ==
=== Bibliography ===
- Jean-Baptiste Guillaume, Genealogical History of the Squires of Salins in the County of Burgundy, Jean-Antoine Vieille, Besançon, 1757, pp. 91 to 94 (in French)
