= Routelle =

Commune in Doubs, France

- Part of Osselle-Routelle
- Location of Routelle
- Location within France Location within Bourgogne-Franche-Comté
- Coordinates: 47°10′07″N 5°51′02″E
- Country: France
- Region: Bourgogne-Franche-Comté
- Department: Doubs
- Arrondissement: Besançon
- Canton: Boussières
- Commune: Osselle-Routelle
- Area^{1}: 3.06 km^{2} (1.18 sq mi)
- Highest elevation: 358 m (1,175 ft)
- Lowest elevation: 212 m (696 ft)
- Population (2023): 514
  - Density: 168/km^{2} (435/sq mi)
- Time zone: UTC+01:00 (CET)
  - Summer (DST): UTC+02:00 (CEST)
- Postal code: 25410
- ^{1} French Land Register data, which excludes lakes, ponds, glaciers > 1 km^{2} (0.386 sq mi or 247 acres) and river estuaries.

Routelle (French pronunciation: [ʁutɛl]) is a former commune in the Doubs department in the Bourgogne-Franche-Comté region in eastern France. On 1 January 2016, it was merged into the new commune Osselle-Routelle.

== Geography ==
Routelle lies 5 km (3.1 mi) northeast of Boussières.

== See also ==
- Communes of the Doubs department
