= Pugey =

- Commune
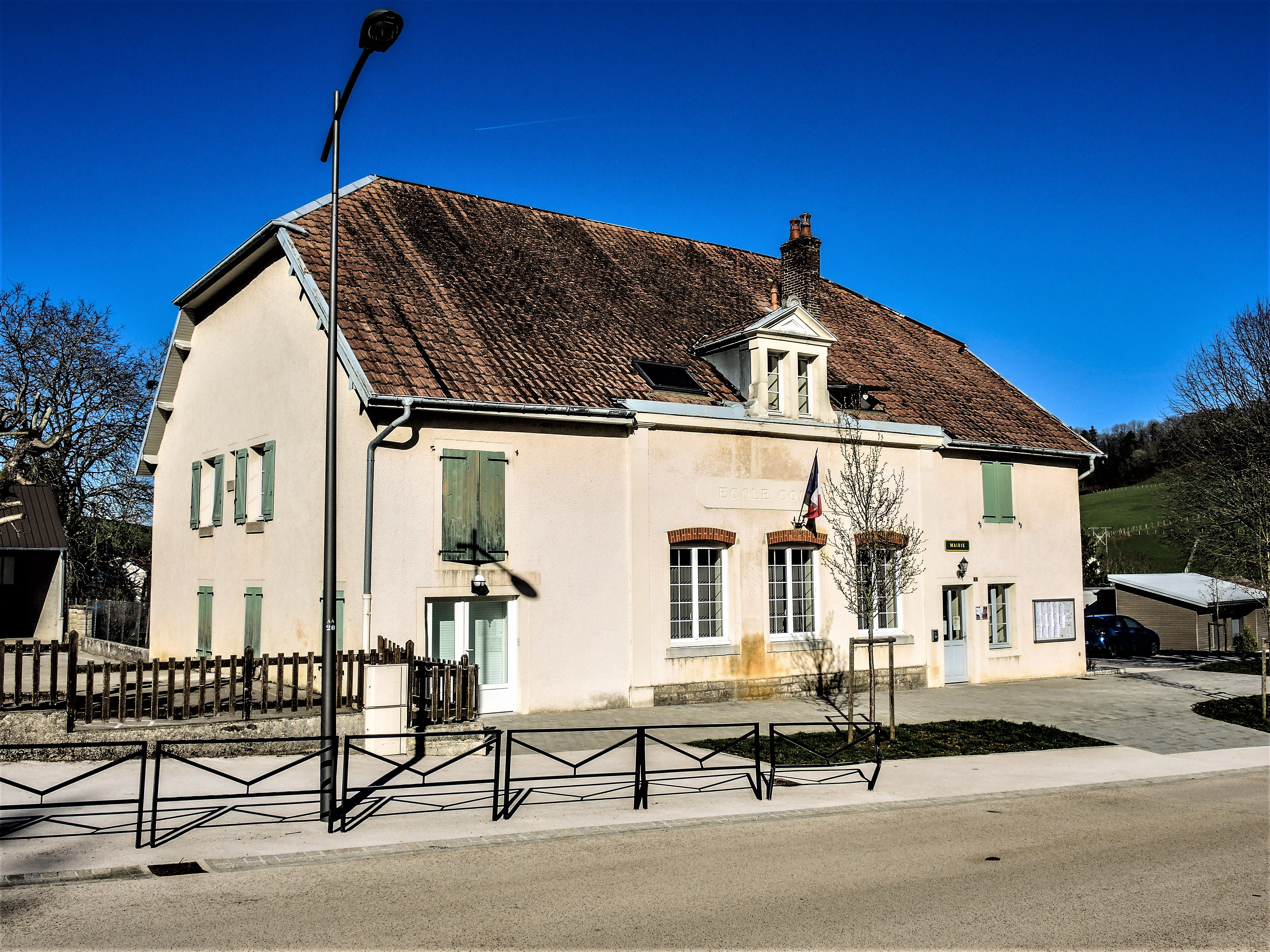
- The town hall in Pugey
- Location of Pugey
- Location within France Location within Bourgogne-Franche-Comté
- Coordinates: 47°11′07″N 5°59′29″E
- Country: France
- Region: Bourgogne-Franche-Comté
- Department: Doubs
- Arrondissement: Besançon
- Canton: Besançon-6
- Intercommunality: Grand Besançon Métropole

Government
  - Mayor (2020–2026): Frank Laidié
- Area^{1}: 7.32 km^{2} (2.83 sq mi)
- Highest elevation: 485 m (1,591 ft)
- Lowest elevation: 335 m (1,099 ft)
- Population (2023): 676
  - Density: 92.3/km^{2} (239/sq mi)
- Time zone: UTC+01:00 (CET)
  - Summer (DST): UTC+02:00 (CEST)
- INSEE/Postal code: 25473 /25720
- ^{1} French Land Register data, which excludes lakes, ponds, glaciers > 1 km^{2} (0.386 sq mi or 247 acres) and river estuaries.

Pugey (French pronunciation: [pyʒɛ]) is a commune in the Doubs department in the Bourgogne-Franche-Comté region in eastern France.

== Geography ==
Pugey lies 10 km (6.2 mi) from Boussières.

== Population ==
Historical population
Year	Pop.	±% p.a.
1968	267	—
1975	453	+7.84%
1982	495	+1.27%
1990	517	+0.55%
1999	665	+2.84%
2007	743	+1.40%
2012	787	+1.16%
2017	742	−1.17%
2023	676	−1.54%
Source: INSEE

== See also ==
- Communes of the Doubs department
