= Larnod =

- Commune
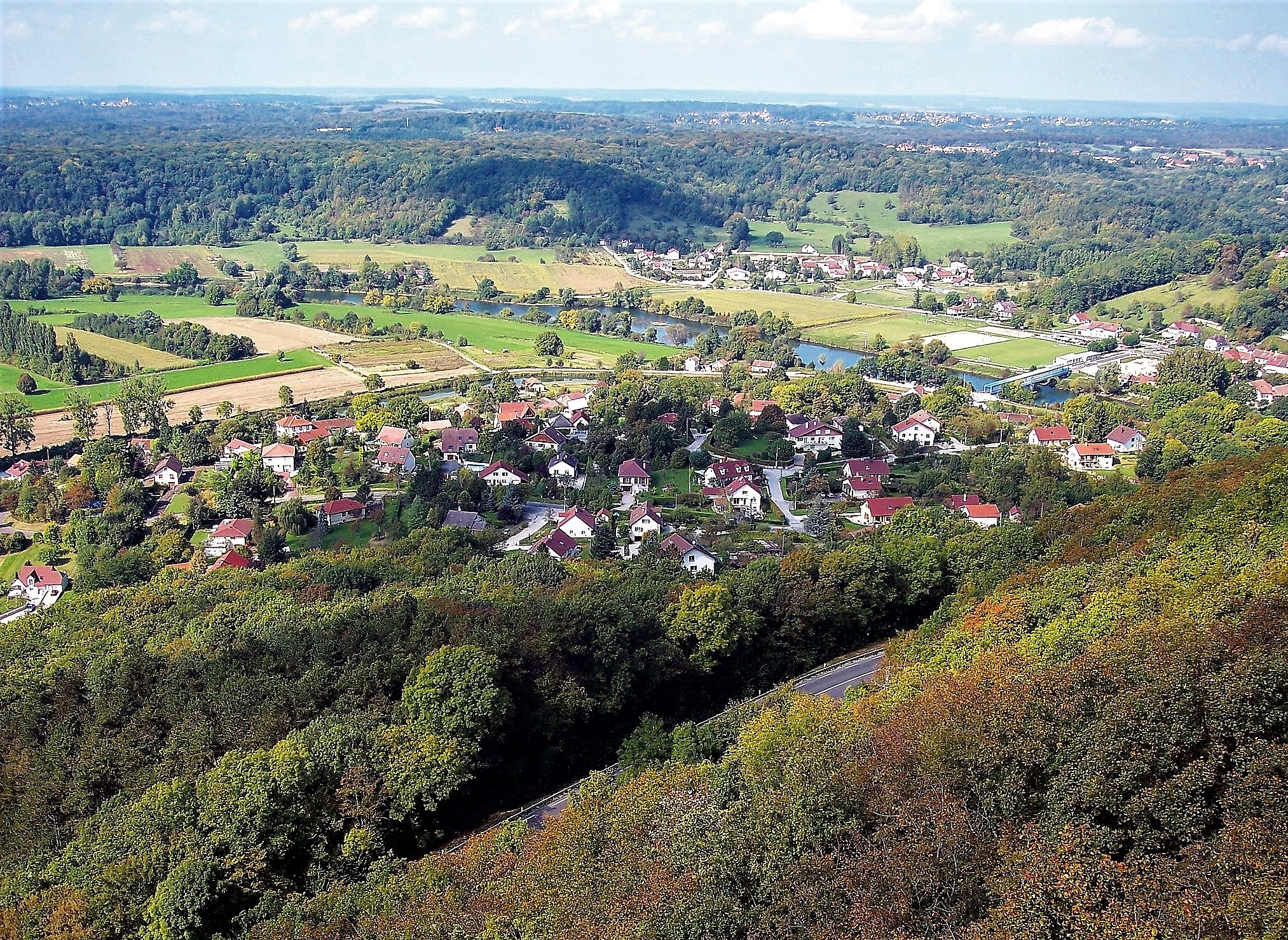
- A general view of Larnod
- Location of Larnod
- Location within France Location within Bourgogne-Franche-Comté
- Coordinates: 47°11′11″N 5°58′22″E
- Country: France
- Region: Bourgogne-Franche-Comté
- Department: Doubs
- Arrondissement: Besançon
- Canton: Besançon-6
- Intercommunality: Grand Besançon Métropole

Government
  - Mayor (2020–2026): Hugues Trudet
- Area^{1}: 4.05 km^{2} (1.56 sq mi)
- Elevation: 380 m (1,250 ft)
- Highest elevation: 470 m (1,540 ft)
- Lowest elevation: 296 m (971 ft)
- Population (2023): 773
  - Density: 191/km^{2} (494/sq mi)
- Time zone: UTC+01:00 (CET)
  - Summer (DST): UTC+02:00 (CEST)
- INSEE/Postal code: 25328 /25720
- ^{1} French Land Register data, which excludes lakes, ponds, glaciers > 1 km^{2} (0.386 sq mi or 247 acres) and river estuaries.

Larnod (French pronunciation: [laʁno]) is a commune in the Doubs department in the Bourgogne-Franche-Comté region in eastern France.

== Geography ==
Larnod is situated on a hill over the valley of the river Doubs. It lies on departmental highway 308 7 km (4.3 mi) northeast of Boussières.

== Population ==
Historical population
Year	Pop.	±% p.a.
1968	216	—
1975	306	+5.10%
1982	514	+7.69%
1990	649	+2.96%
1999	647	−0.03%
2007	590	−1.15%
2012	695	+3.33%
2017	773	+2.15%
2023	773	+0.00%
Source: INSEE

The inhabitants of the commune are called Larnodiens in French.

== See also ==
- Communes of the Doubs department
