= Osselle =

Commune in Doubs, France

- Part of Osselle-Routelle
- Location of Osselle
- Location within France Location within Bourgogne-Franche-Comté
- Coordinates: 47°08′37″N 5°51′25″E
- Country: France
- Region: Bourgogne-Franche-Comté
- Department: Doubs
- Arrondissement: Besançon
- Canton: Boussières
- Commune: Osselle-Routelle
- Area^{1}: 7.68 km^{2} (2.97 sq mi)
- Highest elevation: 384 m (1,260 ft)
- Lowest elevation: 214 m (702 ft)
- Population (2023): 447
  - Density: 58.2/km^{2} (151/sq mi)
- Time zone: UTC+01:00 (CET)
  - Summer (DST): UTC+02:00 (CEST)
- Postal code: 25320
- ^{1} French Land Register data, which excludes lakes, ponds, glaciers > 1 km^{2} (0.386 sq mi or 247 acres) and river estuaries.

Osselle (French pronunciation: [ɔsɛl]) is a former commune in the Doubs department in the Bourgogne-Franche-Comté region in eastern France. On 1 January 2016, it was merged into the new commune Osselle-Routelle. It is about 15 km from Besançon and 70 km from Dijon.

The commune is the site of a set of caves, the entrance to which is near the river Doubs, though the caves themselves extend into the neighboring department of Jura.

== History ==
The caves were discovered in the 13th century, and have been visited since 1504. In 1751 the Intendant of Franche-Comté, Jean-Louis Moreau de Beaumont, had a bridge built over the underground river. During the French Revolution the caves provided a refuge for fugitive priests and there is a clay altar that dates to that time.

== Geography ==
The cave complex consists of some eight kilometers, of which 15 galleries covering a distance of 1.3 kilometers, are currently visitable over flat cement paths. Most of the rooms have stalactites and stalagmites, but there is an area where the ground is less porous to water infiltration and which therefore is dry. The dry area was the venue for feasts in the 18th century, feasts in which the philosopher Voltaire is believed to have participated.

== See also ==
- Communes of the Doubs department
