= Thoraise =

- Commune
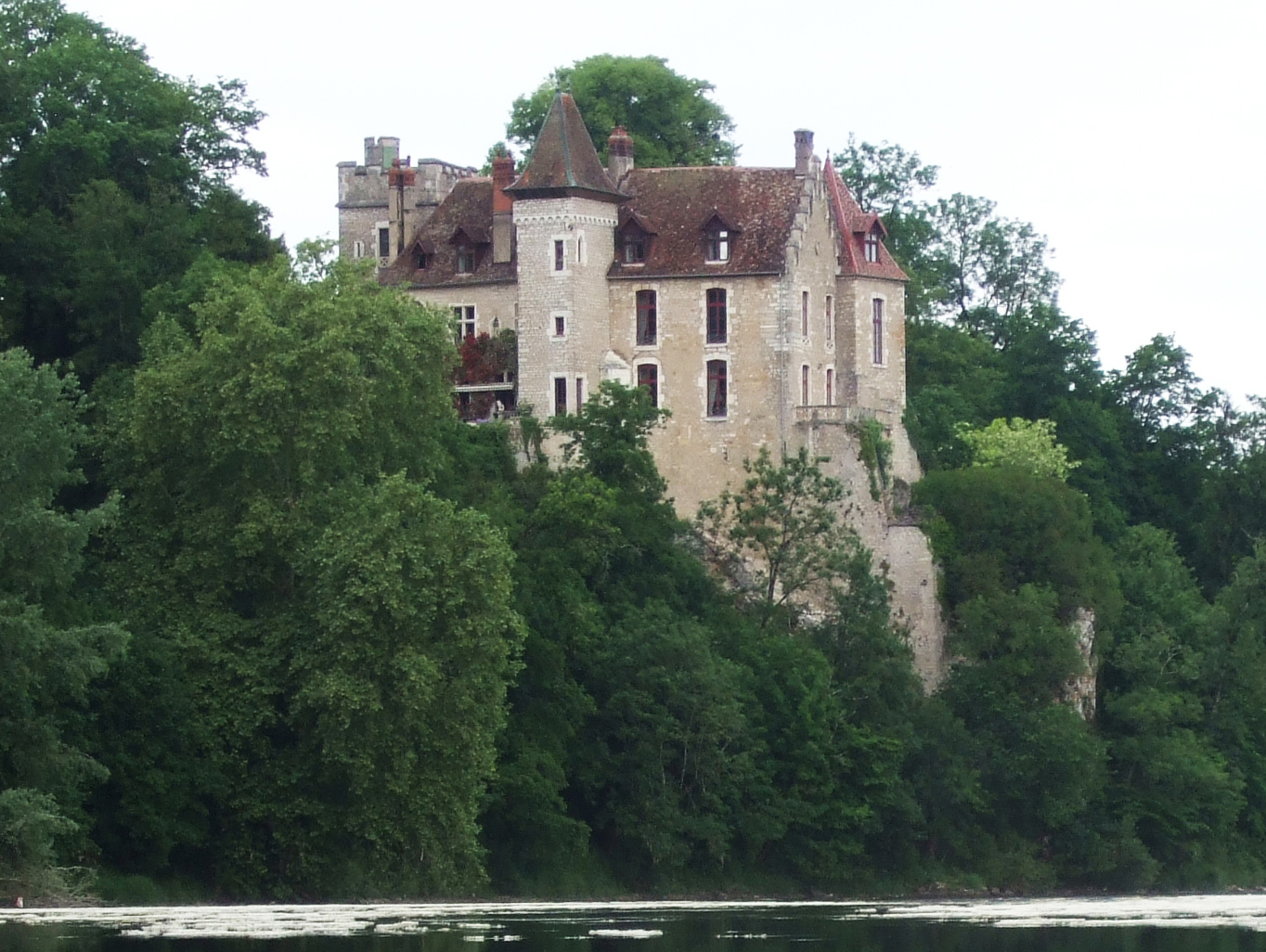
- The chateau in Thoraise
- Location of Thoraise
- Location within France Location within Bourgogne-Franche-Comté
- Coordinates: 47°10′29″N 5°54′14″E
- Country: France
- Region: Bourgogne-Franche-Comté
- Department: Doubs
- Arrondissement: Besançon
- Canton: Besançon-6
- Intercommunality: Grand Besançon Métropole

Government
  - Mayor (2020–2026): Jean-Paul Michaud
- Area^{1}: 3.99 km^{2} (1.54 sq mi)
- Highest elevation: 411 m (1,348 ft)
- Lowest elevation: 222 m (728 ft)
- Population (2023): 336
  - Density: 84.2/km^{2} (218/sq mi)
- Time zone: UTC+01:00 (CET)
  - Summer (DST): UTC+02:00 (CEST)
- INSEE/Postal code: 25561 /25320
- ^{1} French Land Register data, which excludes lakes, ponds, glaciers > 1 km^{2} (0.386 sq mi or 247 acres) and river estuaries.

Thoraise (French pronunciation: [tɔʁɛz]) is a commune in the Doubs department in the Bourgogne-Franche-Comté region in eastern France.

== Geography ==
Thoraise lies 3 km (1.9 mi) north of Boussières on a curve in the Doubs surrounded by cliffs.

== Population ==
Historical population
Year	Pop.	±% p.a.
1968	165	—
1975	153	−1.07%
1982	189	+3.06%
1990	249	+3.51%
1999	239	−0.45%
2007	282	+2.09%
2012	296	+0.97%
2017	362	+4.11%
2023	336	−1.23%
Source: INSEE

== See also ==
- Communes of the Doubs department
