= Torpes, Doubs =

Torpes
- Commune
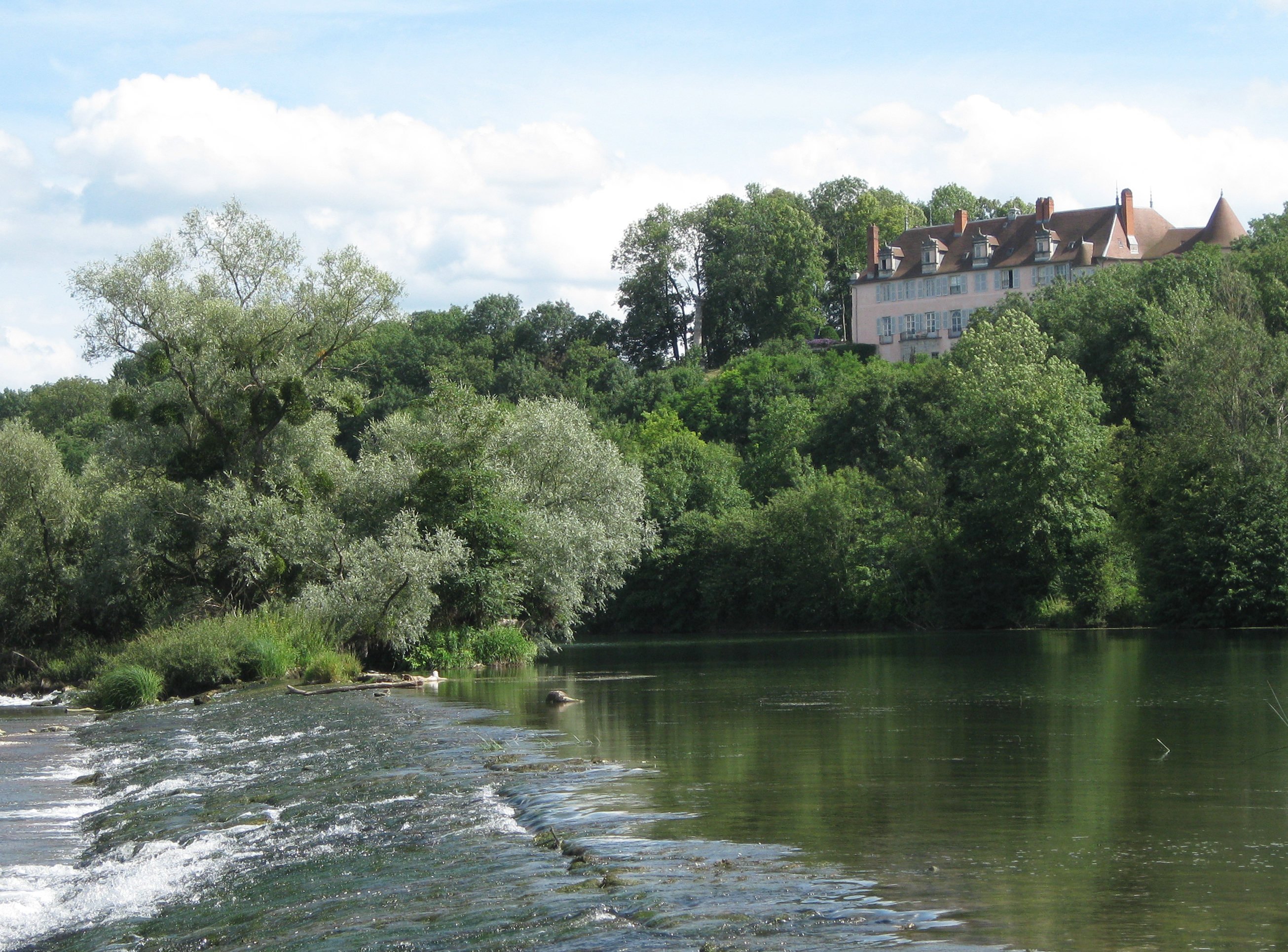
- Chateau
- Location of Torpes
- Location within France Location within Bourgogne-Franche-Comté
- Coordinates: 47°10′12″N 5°53′28″E
- Country: France
- Region: Bourgogne-Franche-Comté
- Department: Doubs
- Arrondissement: Besançon
- Canton: Besançon-6
- Intercommunality: Grand Besançon Métropole

Government
  - Mayor (2020–2026): Denis Jacquin
- Area^{1}: 5.55 km^{2} (2.14 sq mi)
- Highest elevation: 350 m (1,150 ft)
- Lowest elevation: 220 m (720 ft)
- Population (2023): 995
  - Density: 179/km^{2} (464/sq mi)
- Time zone: UTC+01:00 (CET)
  - Summer (DST): UTC+02:00 (CEST)
- INSEE/Postal code: 25564 /25320
- ^{1} French Land Register data, which excludes lakes, ponds, glaciers > 1 km^{2} (0.386 sq mi or 247 acres) and river estuaries.

Torpes (French pronunciation: [tɔʁp]) is a commune in the Doubs department in the Bourgogne-Franche-Comté region in eastern France.

== Geography ==
Torpe lies 2 km (1.2 mi) northwest of Boussières in the valley of the Doubs. It is perched on a plateau 20 to 40 m above the river.

== Population ==
Historical population
Year	Pop.	±% p.a.
1968	469	—
1975	509	+1.18%
1982	566	+1.53%
1990	580	+0.31%
1999	713	+2.32%
2007	788	+1.26%
2012	1,023	+5.36%
2017	1,021	−0.04%
2023	995	−0.43%
Source: INSEE

== See also ==
- Communes of the Doubs department
