= Vorges-les-Pins =

- Commune
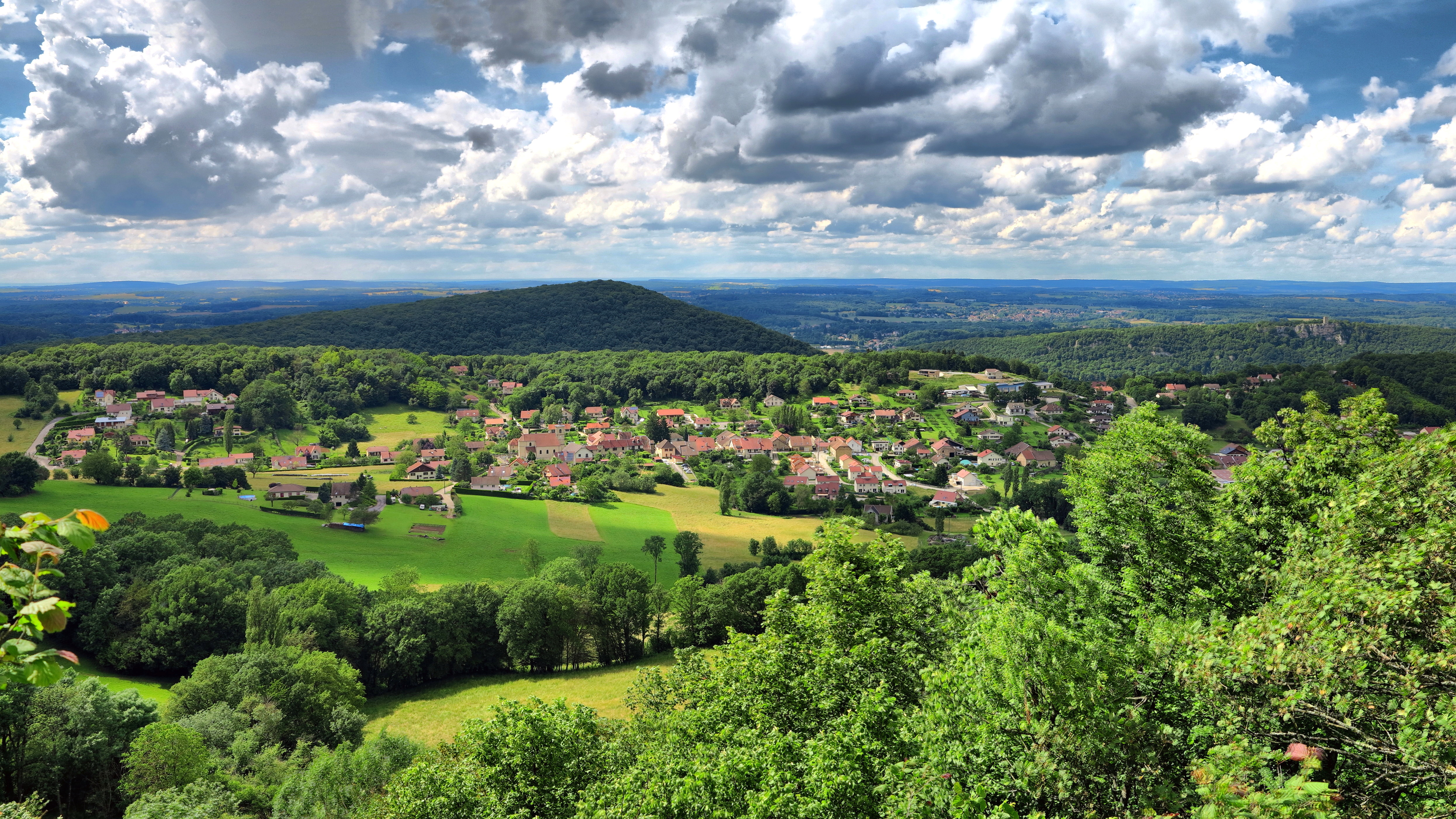
- A general view of Vorges-les-Pins

- Coat of arms
- Location of Vorges-les-Pins
- Location within France Location within Bourgogne-Franche-Comté
- Coordinates: 47°09′30″N 5°55′46″E
- Country: France
- Region: Bourgogne-Franche-Comté
- Department: Doubs
- Arrondissement: Besançon
- Canton: Besançon-6
- Intercommunality: Grand Besançon Métropole

Government
  - Mayor (2020–2026): Maryse Viprey
- Area^{1}: 4.76 km^{2} (1.84 sq mi)
- Highest elevation: 480 m (1,570 ft)
- Lowest elevation: 240 m (790 ft)
- Population (2023): 562
  - Density: 118/km^{2} (306/sq mi)
- Time zone: UTC+01:00 (CET)
  - Summer (DST): UTC+02:00 (CEST)
- INSEE/Postal code: 25631 /25320
- ^{1} French Land Register data, which excludes lakes, ponds, glaciers > 1 km^{2} (0.386 sq mi or 247 acres) and river estuaries.

Vorges-les-Pins (French pronunciation: [vɔʁʒ le pɛ̃]) is a commune in the Doubs department in the Bourgogne-Franche-Comté region in eastern France.

== Population ==
Historical population
Year	Pop.	±% p.a.
1968	161	—
1975	148	−1.20%
1982	256	+8.14%
1990	370	+4.71%
1999	435	+1.81%
2007	501	+1.78%
2012	576	+2.83%
2017	602	+0.89%
2023	562	−1.14%
Source: INSEE

== See also ==
- Communes of the Doubs department
