= Léon Aimé Taverdet =

Léon Aimé Taverde, F.M.C
- Bishop of the Diocese of Langres (emeritus)
- Church: Roman Catholic Church
- See: Roman Catholic Diocese of Langres
- In office: 1981 - 1999
- Predecessor: Lucien Charles Gilbert Daloz
- Successor: Philippe Jean Marie Joseph Gueneley
- Previous post: Prelate

Orders
- Ordination: 25 September 1955

Personal details
- Born: 17 July 1923 Avanne, France
- Died: 8 August 2013 (aged 90) Brienon-sur-Armançon, France

Léon Aimé Taverde, F.M.C (17 July 1923 – 8 August 2013), was a French prelate of the Catholic Church. He was born in Avanne, France, and was ordained a priest on 25 September 1955. He was appointed bishop to the Diocese of Langres on 14 October 1981 and was ordained bishop on 29 November 1981. He retired on 16 December 1999 as bishop of the Langres Diocese.
