= Osselle-Routelle =

- Commune
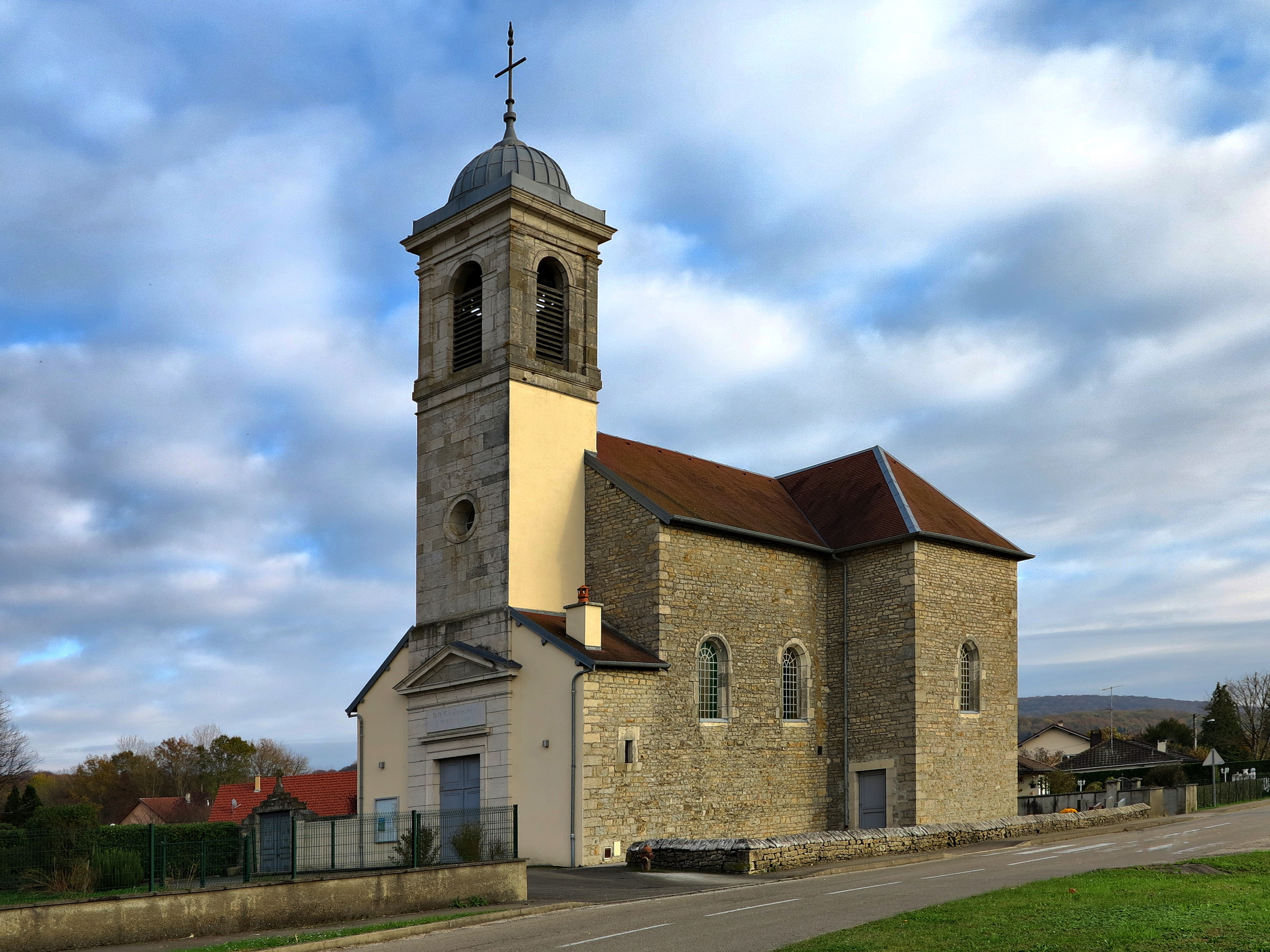
- The church in Routelle
- Location of Osselle-Routelle
- Location within France Location within Bourgogne-Franche-Comté
- Coordinates: 47°08′31″N 5°51′18″E
- Country: France
- Region: Bourgogne-Franche-Comté
- Department: Doubs
- Arrondissement: Besançon
- Canton: Besançon-6
- Intercommunality: Grand Besançon Métropole

Government
  - Mayor (2020–2026): Anne Olszak
- Area^{1}: 10.74 km^{2} (4.15 sq mi)
- Population (2023): 961
  - Density: 89.5/km^{2} (232/sq mi)
- Time zone: UTC+01:00 (CET)
  - Summer (DST): UTC+02:00 (CEST)
- INSEE/Postal code: 25438 /25320
- ^{1} French Land Register data, which excludes lakes, ponds, glaciers > 1 km^{2} (0.386 sq mi or 247 acres) and river estuaries.

Osselle-Routelle (French pronunciation: [ɔsɛl ʁutɛl]) is a commune in the Doubs department of eastern France. The municipality was established on 1 January 2016 and consists of the former communes of Osselle and Routelle.

== See also ==
- Communes of the Doubs department
