= Busy, Doubs =

Busy
- Commune
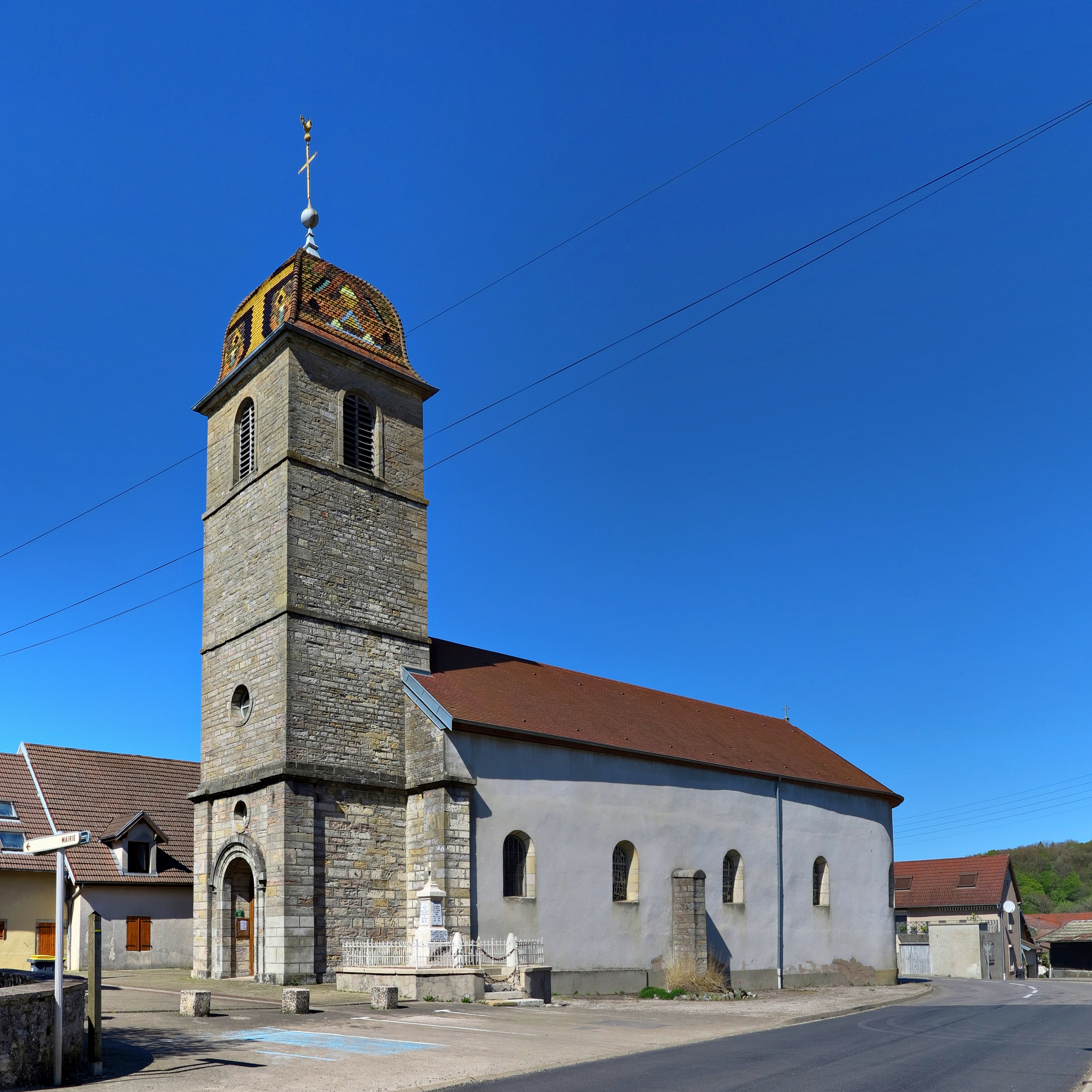
- The church in Busy
- Location of Busy
- Location within France Location within Bourgogne-Franche-Comté
- Coordinates: 47°10′07″N 5°56′54″E
- Country: France
- Region: Bourgogne-Franche-Comté
- Department: Doubs
- Arrondissement: Besançon
- Canton: Besançon-6
- Intercommunality: Grand Besançon Métropole

Government
  - Mayor (2020–2026): Christophe Mulhauser
- Area^{1}: 5.2 km^{2} (2.0 sq mi)
- Highest elevation: 431 m (1,414 ft)
- Lowest elevation: 227 m (745 ft)
- Population (2023): 682
  - Density: 130/km^{2} (340/sq mi)
- Time zone: UTC+01:00 (CET)
  - Summer (DST): UTC+02:00 (CEST)
- INSEE/Postal code: 25103 /25320
- ^{1} French Land Register data, which excludes lakes, ponds, glaciers > 1 km^{2} (0.386 sq mi or 247 acres) and river estuaries.

Busy (French pronunciation: [byzi]) is a commune in the Doubs department in the Bourgogne-Franche-Comté region in eastern France.

== Population ==
Historical population
Year	Pop.	±% p.a.
1968	273	—
1975	300	+1.36%
1982	331	+1.41%
1990	407	+2.62%
1999	487	+2.01%
2007	531	+1.09%
2012	572	+1.50%
2017	630	+1.95%
2023	682	+1.33%
Source: INSEE

== See also ==
- Communes of the Doubs department
