= Fourg =

- Commune
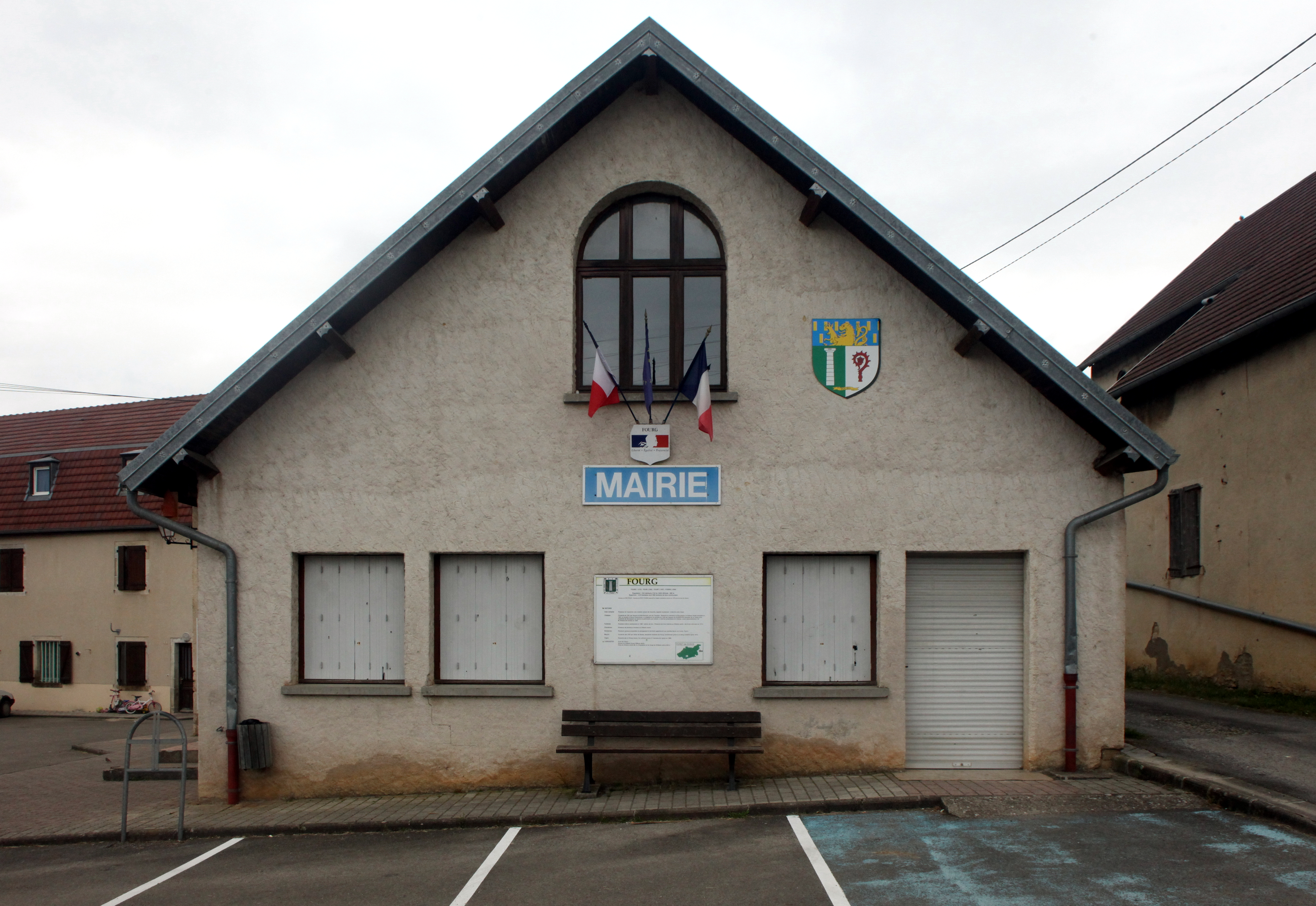
- The town hall in Fourg

- Coat of arms
- Location of Fourg
- Location within France Location within Bourgogne-Franche-Comté
- Coordinates: 47°05′56″N 5°48′41″E
- Country: France
- Region: Bourgogne-Franche-Comté
- Department: Doubs
- Arrondissement: Besançon
- Canton: Saint-Vit
- Intercommunality: Loue-Lison

Government
  - Mayor (2020–2026): Pascal Dugourd
- Area^{1}: 12.1 km^{2} (4.7 sq mi)
- Highest elevation: 445 m (1,460 ft)
- Lowest elevation: 250 m (820 ft)
- Population (2023): 370
  - Density: 31/km^{2} (79/sq mi)
- Time zone: UTC+01:00 (CET)
  - Summer (DST): UTC+02:00 (CEST)
- INSEE/Postal code: 25253 /25440
- ^{1} French Land Register data, which excludes lakes, ponds, glaciers > 1 km^{2} (0.386 sq mi or 247 acres) and river estuaries.

Fourg (French pronunciation: [fuʁ]) is a commune in the Doubs department in the Bourgogne-Franche-Comté region in eastern France.

== Population ==
Historical population
Year	Pop.	±% p.a.
1968	195	—
1975	156	−3.14%
1982	180	+2.07%
1990	234	+3.33%
1999	254	+0.92%
2007	328	+3.25%
2012	318	−0.62%
2017	380	+3.63%
2023	370	−0.44%
Source: INSEE

== See also ==
- Communes of the Doubs department
