= House of Faucogney =

Noble family

Family de Faucogney coat of arms

The family of Faucogney is an extinct noble family that came from Faucogney in Franche-Comté in France. The family divided in four branches in the middle of the 12th century and became extinct in the 14th century.

== History ==
The family took its name from the seigneury of Faucogney in Franche-Comté. Its filiation goes back to Gislebert landlord of Faucogney and viscount of Vesoul who founded in 1092 a priory near Vesoul.

The Faucogney family was divided in four branches in the middle of the 12th Century.

In addition to the seigneury of Faucogney, the Faucogney family owned many seigneuries in the surrounding villages.

Jean de Faucogney married before 1336 Isabelle de France, daughter of King Philippe V and widow of Guigues VIII de La Tour du Pin (1309–1333), they didn't have any children.

The Faucogney family became extinct in the 14th century in the de Longwy family with the marriage in 1370 of Jeanne de Faucogney with Henri de Longwy, lord of Rahon.

== Bibliography ==
- Jean-Baptiste Guillaume, Histoire généalogique des sires de Salins au comté de Bourgogne, chez Jean-Antoine, 1757, pages 96-100 Family de Faucogney
- Roger de Lurion, Nobiliaire de Franche-Comté, Besançon, 1890, pages 309-310. Family de Faucogney
- Jules Finot, Les sires de Faucogney, vicomtes de Vesoul, H. Champion, 1886.
