= Samson, Doubs =

Samson
- Commune
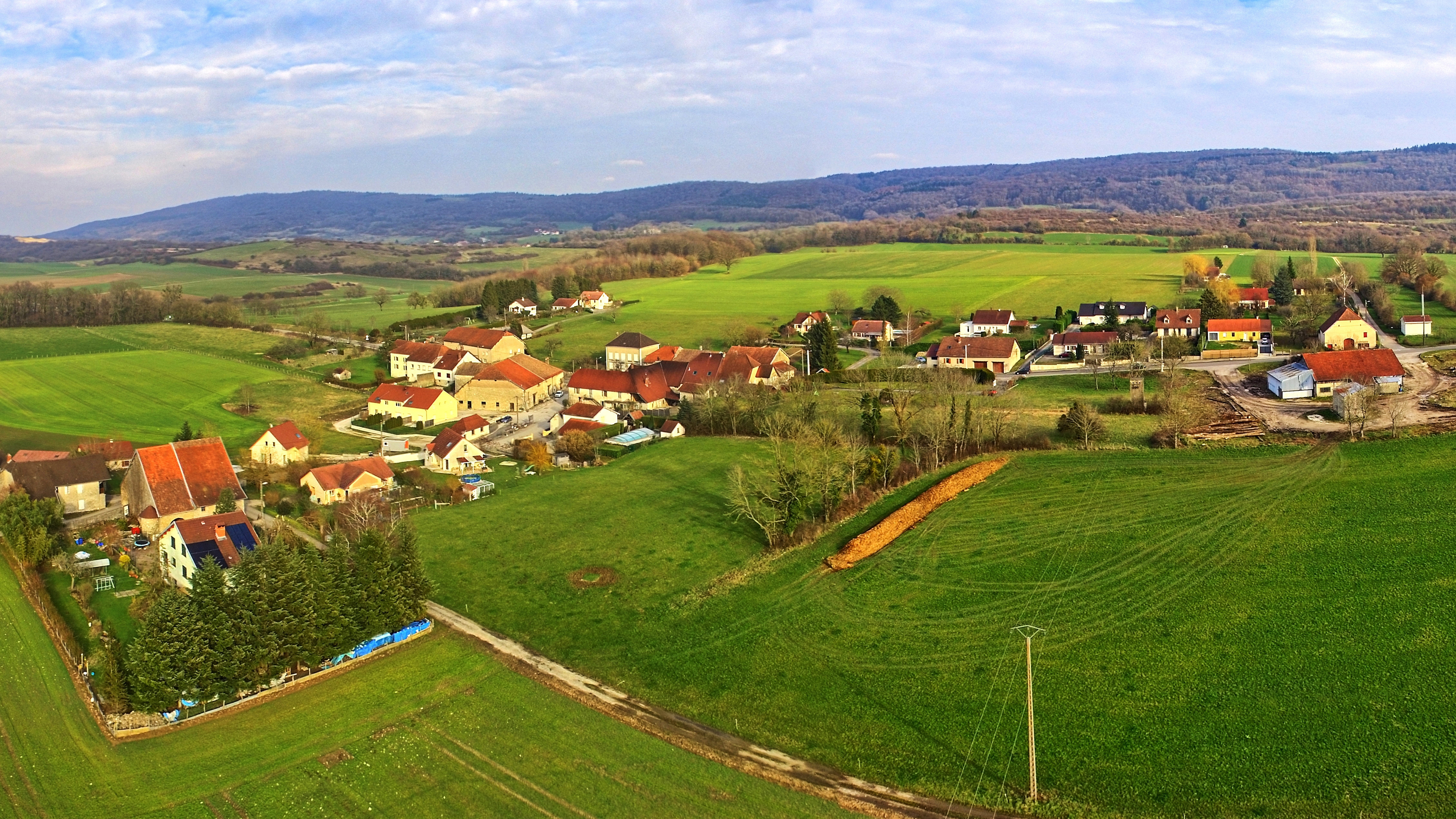
- A general view of Samson
- Location of Samson
- Location within France Location within Bourgogne-Franche-Comté
- Coordinates: 47°03′15″N 5°52′47″E
- Country: France
- Region: Bourgogne-Franche-Comté
- Department: Doubs
- Arrondissement: Besançon
- Canton: Saint-Vit
- Intercommunality: Loue-Lison

Government
  - Mayor (2020–2026): Rémy Paul
- Area^{1}: 1.95 km^{2} (0.75 sq mi)
- Highest elevation: 361 m (1,184 ft)
- Lowest elevation: 269 m (883 ft)
- Population (2023): 74
  - Density: 38/km^{2} (98/sq mi)
- Time zone: UTC+01:00 (CET)
  - Summer (DST): UTC+02:00 (CEST)
- INSEE/Postal code: 25528 /25440
- ^{1} French Land Register data, which excludes lakes, ponds, glaciers > 1 km^{2} (0.386 sq mi or 247 acres) and river estuaries.

Samson (French pronunciation: [sɑ̃sɔ̃]) is a commune in the Doubs department in the Bourgogne-Franche-Comté region in eastern France.

== Geography ==
Samson lies 28 km (17 mi) south of Besançon on national highway 83.

== Population ==
Historical population
Year	Pop.	±% p.a.
1968	47	—
1975	33	−4.93%
1982	48	+5.50%
1990	70	+4.83%
1999	68	−0.32%
2007	66	−0.37%
2012	86	+5.44%
2017	86	+0.00%
2023	74	−2.47%
Source: INSEE

== See also ==
- Communes of the Doubs department
