= Montferrand-le-Château =

- Commune
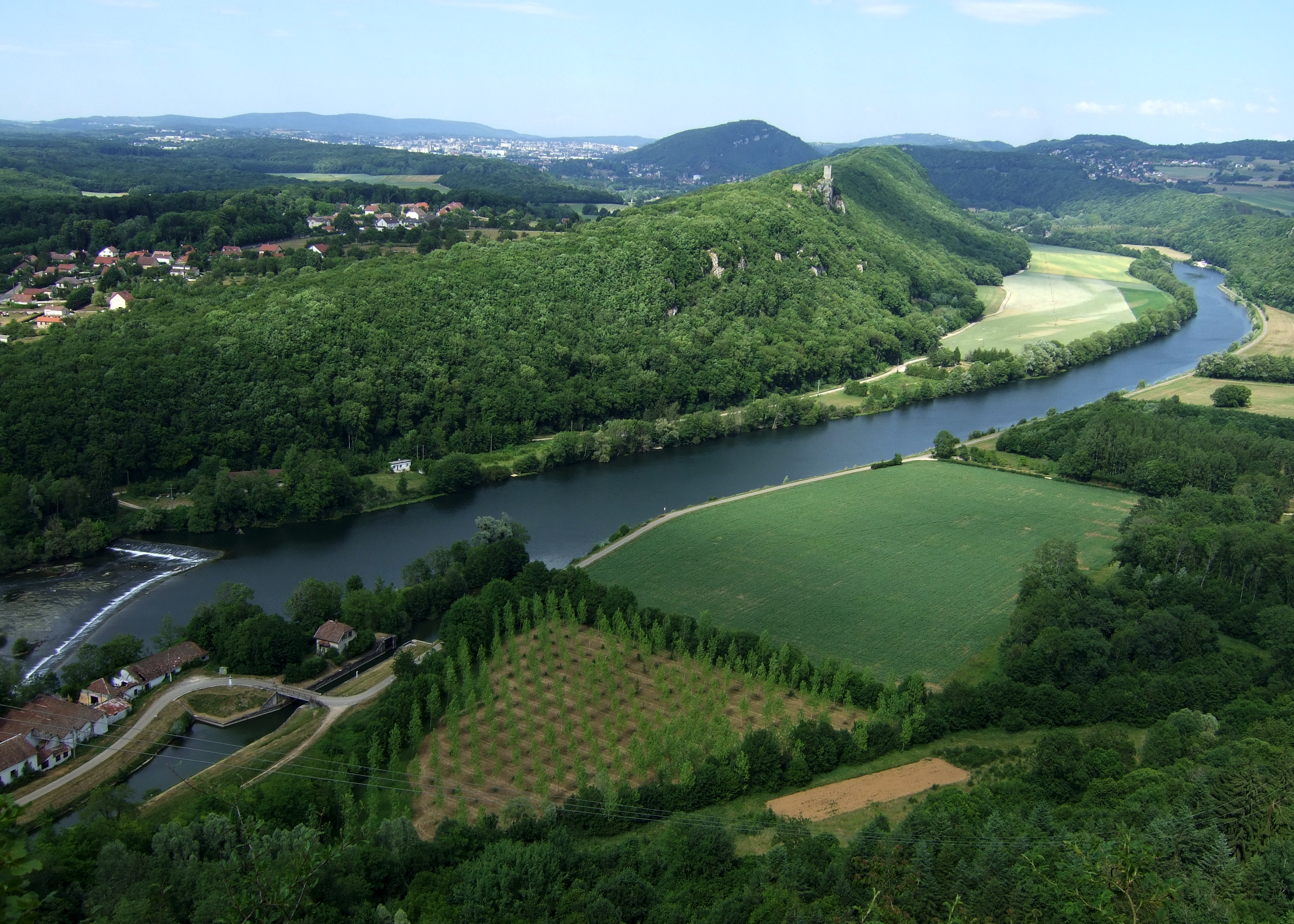
- A general view of Montferrand-le-Château

- Coat of arms
- Location of Montferrand-le-Château
- Location within France Location within Bourgogne-Franche-Comté
- Coordinates: 47°11′02″N 5°54′31″E
- Country: France
- Region: Bourgogne-Franche-Comté
- Department: Doubs
- Arrondissement: Besançon
- Canton: Besançon-6
- Intercommunality: Grand Besançon Métropole

Government
  - Mayor (2020–2026): Michel Gaillot
- Area^{1}: 7.48 km^{2} (2.89 sq mi)
- Highest elevation: 371 m (1,217 ft)
- Lowest elevation: 223 m (732 ft)
- Population (2023): 2,180
  - Density: 291/km^{2} (755/sq mi)
- Time zone: UTC+01:00 (CET)
  - Summer (DST): UTC+02:00 (CEST)
- INSEE/Postal code: 25397 /25320
- ^{1} French Land Register data, which excludes lakes, ponds, glaciers > 1 km^{2} (0.386 sq mi or 247 acres) and river estuaries.

Montferrand-le-Château (French pronunciation: [mɔ̃fɛʁɑ̃ lə ʃato]) is a commune in the Doubs department in the Bourgogne-Franche-Comté region in eastern France.

== Geography ==
The commune lies 10 km (6.2 mi) from Besançon.

== Population ==
Historical population
Year	Pop.	±% p.a.
1968	974	—
1975	1,452	+5.87%
1982	1,612	+1.50%
1990	1,724	+0.84%
1999	1,896	+1.06%
2007	2,171	+1.71%
2012	2,195	+0.22%
2017	2,161	−0.31%
2023	2,180	+0.15%
Source: INSEE

== See also ==
- Communes of the Doubs department
