= Beure =

- Commune
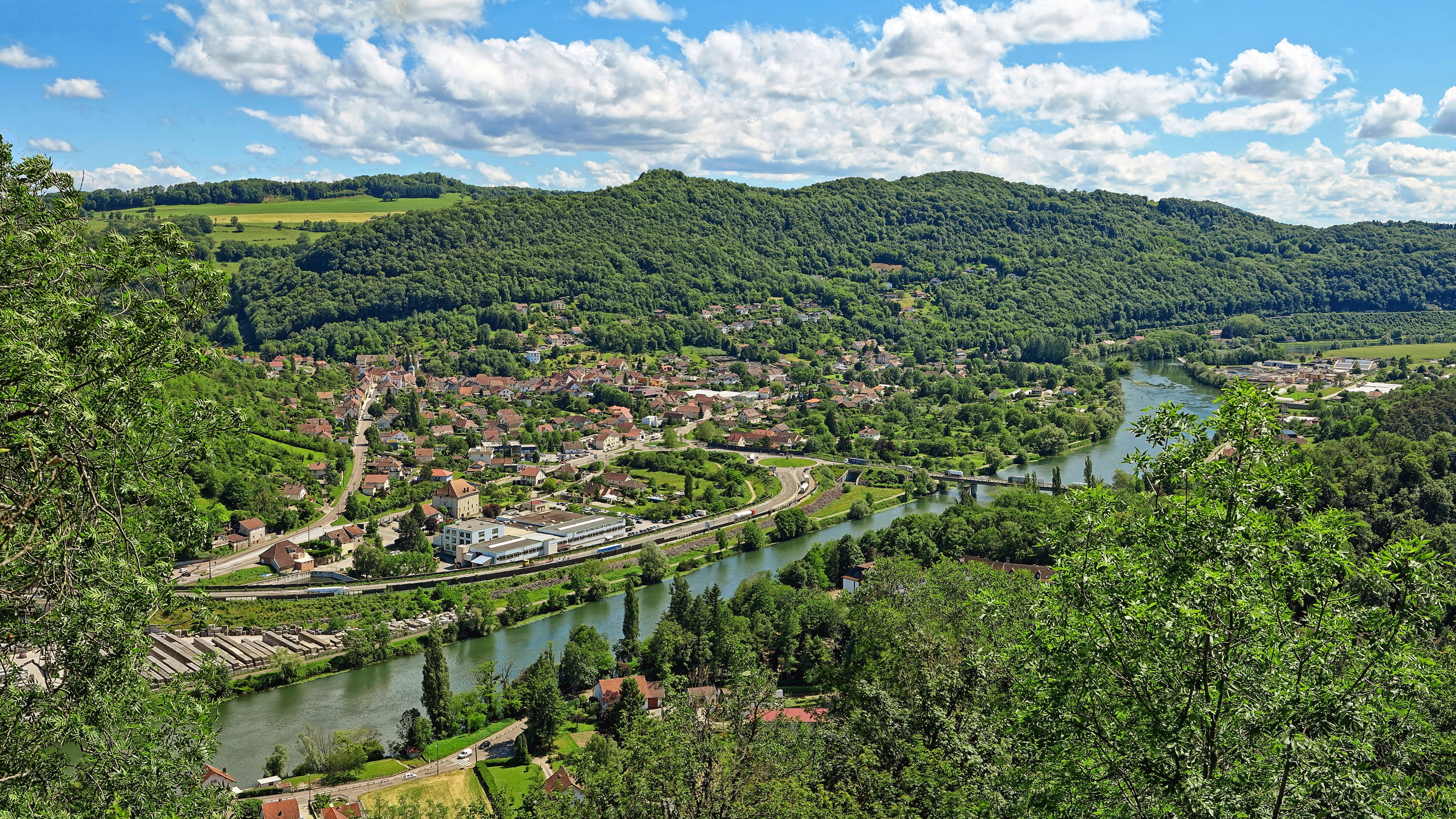
- General view

- Coat of arms
- Location of Beure
- Location within France Location within Bourgogne-Franche-Comté
- Coordinates: 47°12′32″N 6°00′16″E
- Country: France
- Region: Bourgogne-Franche-Comté
- Department: Doubs
- Arrondissement: Besançon
- Canton: Besançon-6
- Intercommunality: Grand Besançon Métropole

Government
  - Mayor (2020–2026): Philippe Chaney
- Area^{1}: 3.99 km^{2} (1.54 sq mi)
- Highest elevation: 480 m (1,570 ft)
- Lowest elevation: 234 m (768 ft)
- Population (2023): 1,305
  - Density: 327/km^{2} (847/sq mi)
- Time zone: UTC+01:00 (CET)
  - Summer (DST): UTC+02:00 (CEST)
- INSEE/Postal code: 25058 /25720
- ^{1} French Land Register data, which excludes lakes, ponds, glaciers > 1 km^{2} (0.386 sq mi or 247 acres) and river estuaries.

Beure (French pronunciation: [bœʁ]) is a commune in the Doubs department in the Bourgogne-Franche-Comté region in eastern France.

== Population ==
Historical population
Year	Pop.	±% p.a.
1968	1,278	—
1975	1,243	−0.40%
1982	1,166	−0.91%
1990	1,188	+0.23%
1999	1,377	+1.65%
2007	1,384	+0.06%
2012	1,359	−0.36%
2017	1,349	−0.15%
2023	1,305	−0.55%
Source: INSEE

== See also ==
- Communes of the Doubs department
