= Boussières =

- Commune
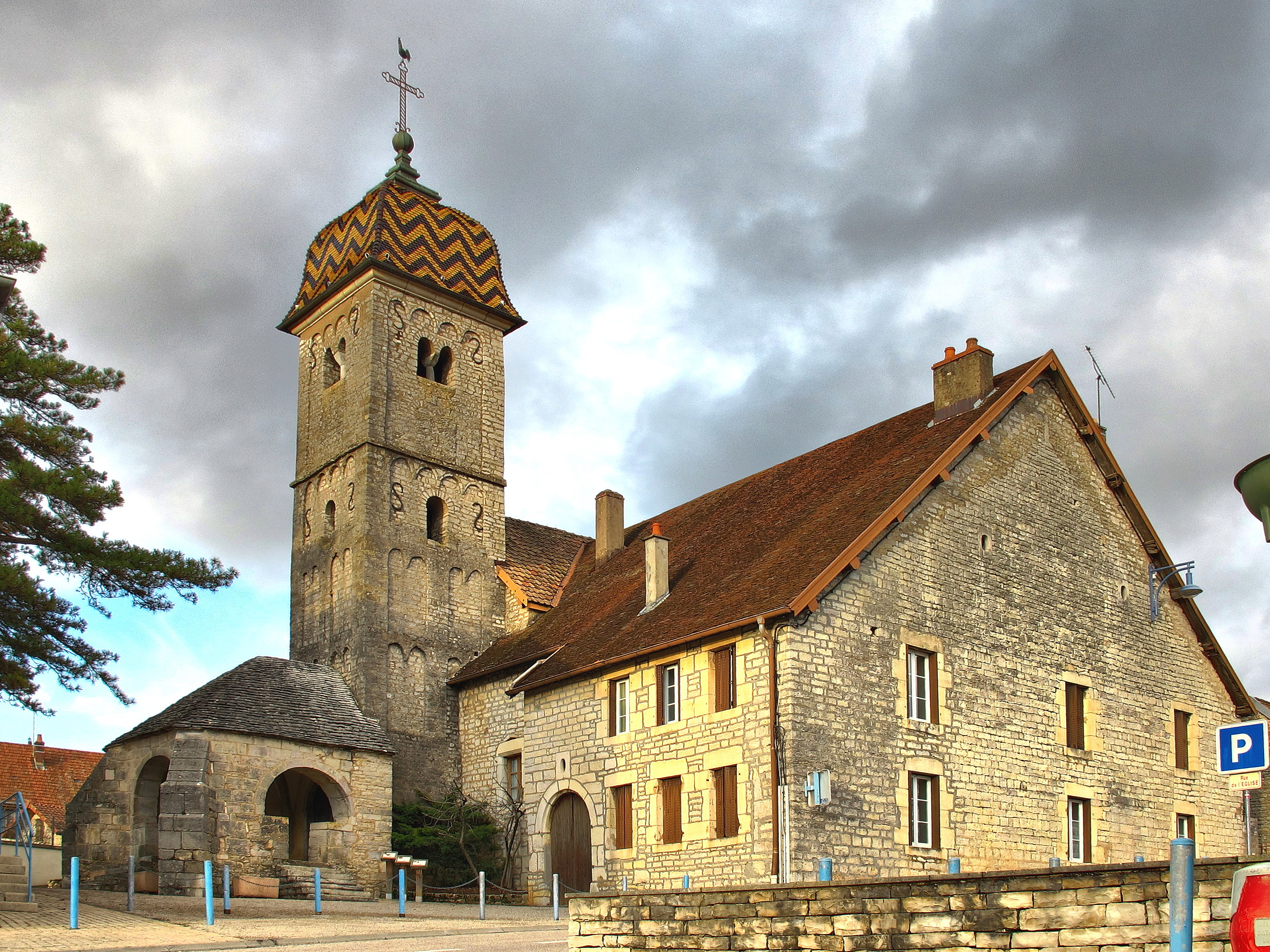
- The church in Boussières
- Location of Boussières
- Location within France Location within Bourgogne-Franche-Comté
- Coordinates: 47°09′30″N 5°54′08″E
- Country: France
- Region: Bourgogne-Franche-Comté
- Department: Doubs
- Arrondissement: Besançon
- Canton: Besançon-6
- Intercommunality: Grand Besançon Métropole

Government
  - Mayor (2022–2026): Eloy Jaramago
- Area^{1}: 5.58 km^{2} (2.15 sq mi)
- Highest elevation: 452 m (1,483 ft)
- Lowest elevation: 220 m (720 ft)
- Population (2023): 1,208
  - Density: 216/km^{2} (561/sq mi)
- Time zone: UTC+01:00 (CET)
  - Summer (DST): UTC+02:00 (CEST)
- INSEE/Postal code: 25084 /25320
- ^{1} French Land Register data, which excludes lakes, ponds, glaciers > 1 km^{2} (0.386 sq mi or 247 acres) and river estuaries.

Boussières (French pronunciation: [busjɛʁ]) is a commune in the Doubs department in the Bourgogne-Franche-Comté region in eastern France.

== Politics and administration ==
Boussières had been the seat of a canton until its attachment to the new Canton of Besançon-6.

=== Municipal government ===
List of successive mayors of Boussières
In office		Name	Ref.
1873	1884	Émile Retrouvey	
1884	1896	Célestin Poulet	
1896	1898	Joseph Retrouvey	
1898	1903	Célestin Poulet	
1903	1912	Jean Zuber	
1919	1941	Ernest Zuber	
1941	1959	Maurice Mille	
1959	1965	Raymond Ploux	
1965	29 March 1977	Jean Canal	
29 March 1977	14 March 2008	Michel Poulet	
14 March 2008	23 May 2020	Bertrand Astric	
23 May 2020	March 2022	Hélène Astric	
March 2022	incumbent	Eloy Jaramago	

== Population ==
Historical population
Year	Pop.	±% p.a.
1968	531	—
1975	697	+3.96%
1982	762	+1.28%
1990	837	+1.18%
1999	929	+1.17%
2007	1,062	+1.69%
2012	1,086	+0.45%
2017	1,123	+0.67%
2023	1,208	+1.22%
Source: INSEE

== See also ==
- Communes of the Doubs department
