= Peseux =

Peseux may refer to:

- Peseux, Neuchâtel, a commune in the Swiss canton of Neuchâtel
- Péseux, a commune in the French department of Doubs
- Peseux, Jura, a commune in the French department of Jura
