= Fournet =

Fournet is a surname. Notable people with the surname include:

- André-Hubert Fournet (1752–1834), French Roman Catholic priest, co-founder of the Sisters of the Cross
- Bernard Fournet (born 1941), French hurdler
- Douglas B. Fournet (1943–1968), United States Army officer, recipient of the Medal of Honor
- Jean Fournet (1913–2008), French flautist and conductor
- Jean-Luc Fournet (born 1965), French papyrologist
- John B. Fournet (1895–1984), American attorney and politician
- Joseph Jean Baptiste Xavier Fournet (1801–1869), French geologist and metallurgist
- Louis Dartige du Fournet (1856–1940), French admiral during World War I
- Sid Fournet (1932–2011), American collegiate and professional American football player
- Sébastien Fournet-Fayard (born 1985), French road cyclist

== See also ==
- Le Fournet, commune in the Calvados department in the Normandy region in northwestern France
- Fournet-Blancheroche, commune in the Doubs department in the Bourgogne-Franche-Comté region in eastern France
- Fournets-Luisans, commune in the Doubs department in the Bourgogne-Franche-Comté region in eastern France
- Leonard Fournette (born 1995), American footballer
