= Canton of Valdahon =

Coordinates: 47.15°N 6.34°E

The canton of Valdahon is an administrative division of the Doubs department, eastern France. It was created at the French canton reorganisation which came into effect in March 2015. Its seat is in Valdahon.

It consists of the following communes:

1. Adam-lès-Vercel
2. Avoudrey
3. Battenans-Varin
4. Belleherbe
5. Belmont
6. Bremondans
7. Bretonvillers
8. Chamesey
9. Charmoille
10. Chaux-lès-Passavant
11. Chevigney-lès-Vercel
12. Consolation-Maisonnettes
13. Cour-Saint-Maurice
14. Courtetain-et-Salans
15. Domprel
16. Épenouse
17. Épenoy
18. Étalans
19. Étray
20. Eysson
21. Fallerans
22. Flangebouche
23. Fournets-Luisans
24. Fuans
25. Germéfontaine
26. Grandfontaine-sur-Creuse
27. La Grange
28. Guyans-Durnes
29. Guyans-Vennes
30. Landresse
31. Laviron
32. Longechaux
33. Longemaison
34. Longevelle-lès-Russey
35. Loray
36. Magny-Châtelard
37. Orchamps-Vennes
38. Orsans
39. Ouvans
40. Passonfontaine
41. Péseux
42. Pierrefontaine-les-Varans
43. Plaimbois-Vennes
44. Les Premiers-Sapins
45. Provenchère
46. Rosières-sur-Barbèche
47. Rosureux
48. La Sommette
49. Valdahon
50. Vaucluse
51. Vauclusotte
52. Vellerot-lès-Vercel
53. Vennes
54. Vercel-Villedieu-le-Camp
55. Vernierfontaine
56. Villers-Chief
57. Villers-la-Combe
58. Voires
