= Fallerans =

- Commune
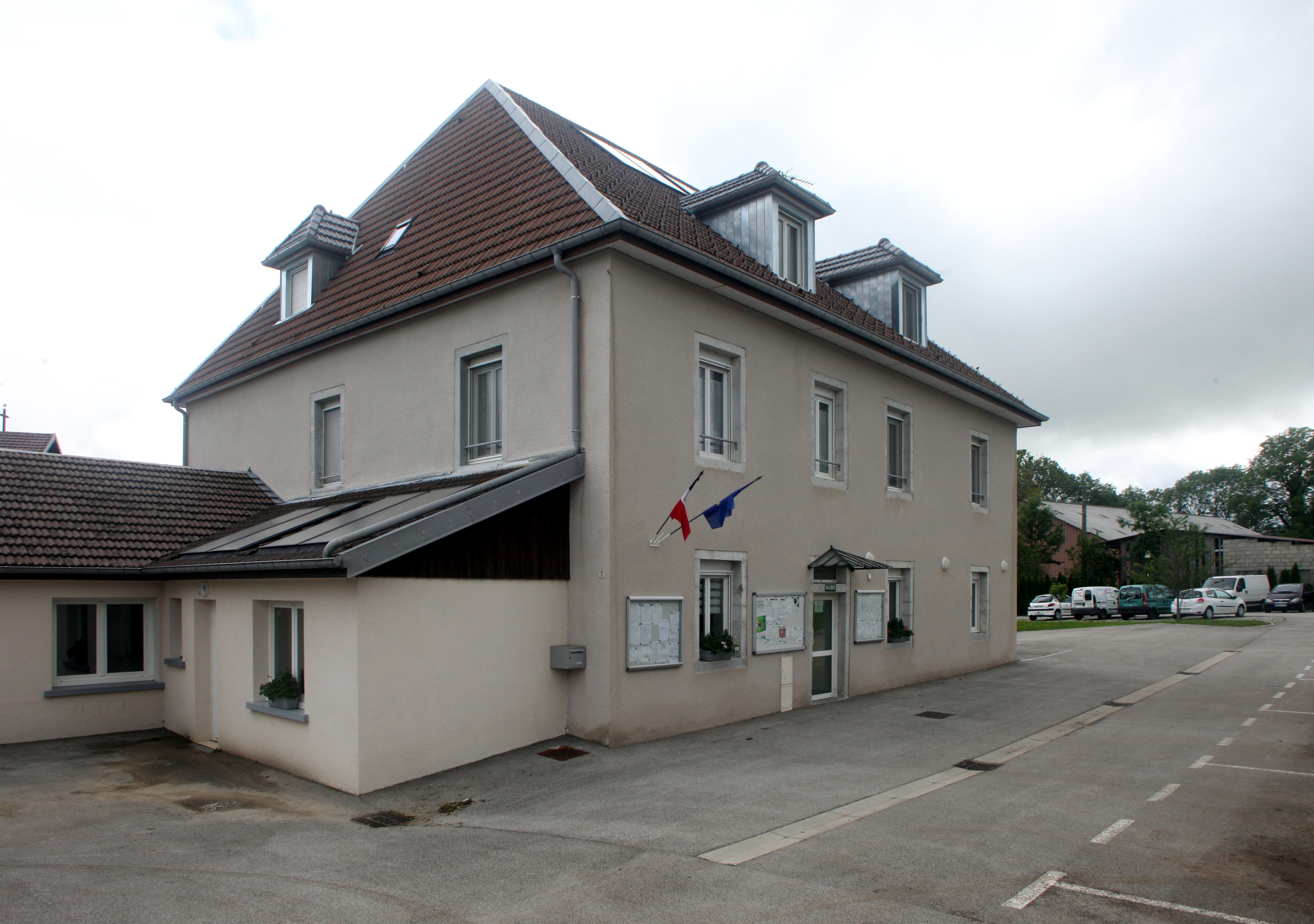
- The town hall in Fallerans
- Location of Fallerans
- Location within France Location within Bourgogne-Franche-Comté
- Coordinates: 47°07′59″N 6°17′27″E
- Country: France
- Region: Bourgogne-Franche-Comté
- Department: Doubs
- Arrondissement: Pontarlier
- Canton: Valdahon

Government
  - Mayor (2020–2026): Daniel Brunelles
- Area^{1}: 10.78 km^{2} (4.16 sq mi)
- Highest elevation: 676 m (2,218 ft)
- Lowest elevation: 565 m (1,854 ft)
- Population (2023): 293
  - Density: 27.2/km^{2} (70.4/sq mi)
- Time zone: UTC+01:00 (CET)
  - Summer (DST): UTC+02:00 (CEST)
- INSEE/Postal code: 25233 /25580
- ^{1} French Land Register data, which excludes lakes, ponds, glaciers > 1 km^{2} (0.386 sq mi or 247 acres) and river estuaries.

Fallerans (French pronunciation: [falʁɑ̃]) is a commune in the Doubs department in the Bourgogne-Franche-Comté region in eastern France.

== Population ==
Historical population
Year	Pop.	±% p.a.
1968	196	—
1975	176	−1.53%
1982	193	+1.33%
1990	197	+0.26%
1999	222	+1.34%
2007	245	+1.24%
2012	257	+0.96%
2017	284	+2.02%
2023	293	+0.52%
Source: INSEE

== See also ==
- Communes of the Doubs department
