= Rosureux =

- Commune
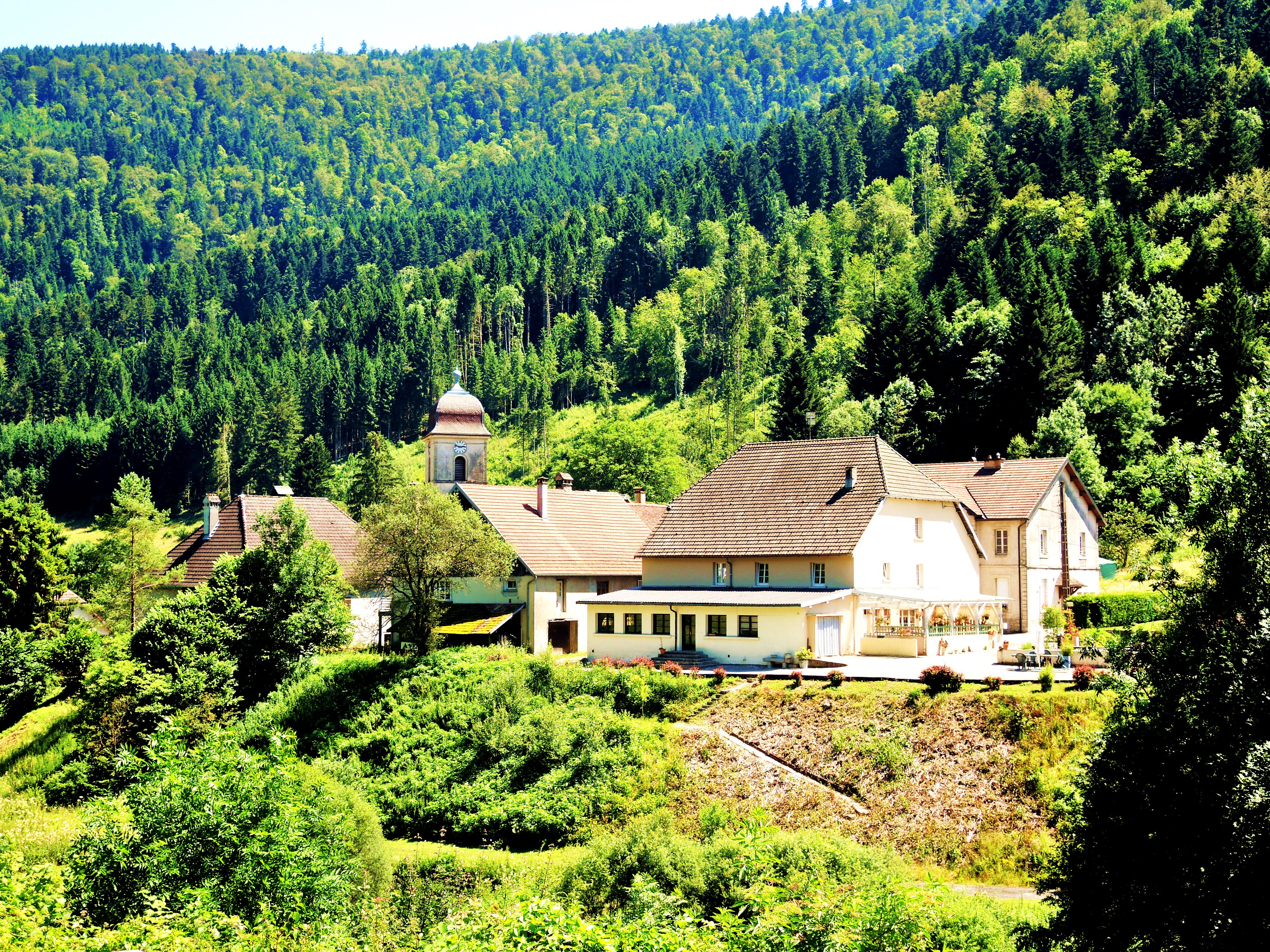
- A general view of Rosureux
- Location of Rosureux
- Location within France Location within Bourgogne-Franche-Comté
- Coordinates: 47°13′08″N 6°41′16″E
- Country: France
- Region: Bourgogne-Franche-Comté
- Department: Doubs
- Arrondissement: Pontarlier
- Canton: Valdahon

Government
  - Mayor (2020–2026): Jerome Boillon
- Area^{1}: 6.14 km^{2} (2.37 sq mi)
- Highest elevation: 972 m (3,189 ft)
- Lowest elevation: 428 m (1,404 ft)
- Population (2023): 79
  - Density: 13/km^{2} (33/sq mi)
- Time zone: UTC+01:00 (CET)
  - Summer (DST): UTC+02:00 (CEST)
- INSEE/Postal code: 25504 /25380
- ^{1} French Land Register data, which excludes lakes, ponds, glaciers > 1 km^{2} (0.386 sq mi or 247 acres) and river estuaries.

Rosureux (French pronunciation: [ʁozyʁø]) is a commune in the Doubs department in the Bourgogne-Franche-Comté region in eastern France.

== Geography ==
Rosureux lies 26 km (16 mi) from Le Russey on the banks of the Dessoubre.

== Population ==
Historical population
Year	Pop.	±% p.a.
1968	117	—
1975	81	−5.12%
1982	82	+0.18%
1990	102	+2.77%
1999	81	−2.53%
2007	94	+1.88%
2012	79	−3.42%
2017	78	−0.25%
2023	79	+0.21%
Source: INSEE

== See also ==
- Communes of the Doubs department
