= Passonfontaine =

- Commune
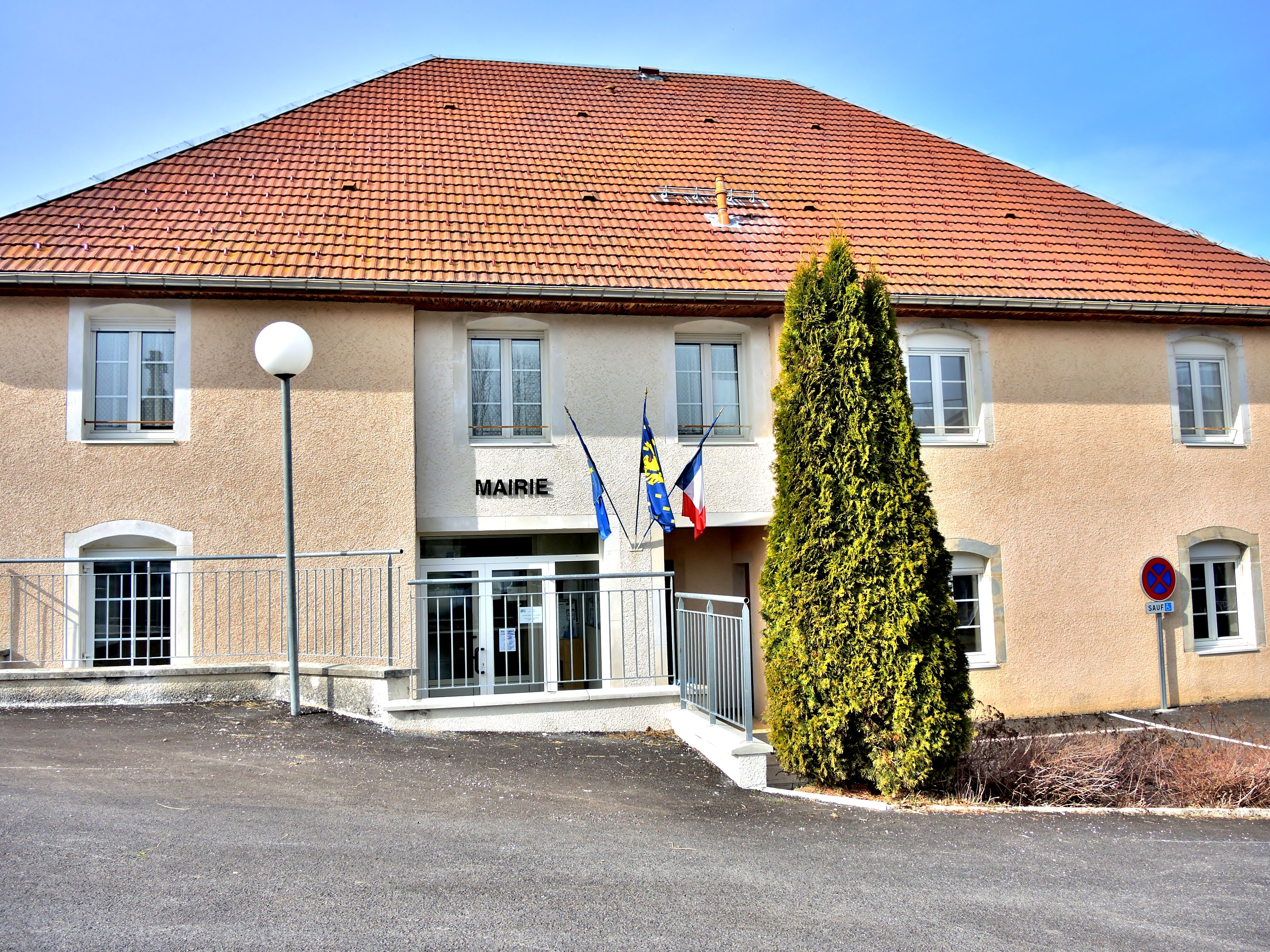
- The town hall in Passonfontaine
- Location of Passonfontaine
- Location within France Location within Bourgogne-Franche-Comté
- Coordinates: 47°06′31″N 6°25′10″E
- Country: France
- Region: Bourgogne-Franche-Comté
- Department: Doubs
- Arrondissement: Pontarlier
- Canton: Valdahon

Government
  - Mayor (2020–2026): Benoit Bouchard
- Area^{1}: 19.49 km^{2} (7.53 sq mi)
- Highest elevation: 960 m (3,150 ft)
- Lowest elevation: 715 m (2,346 ft)
- Population (2023): 331
  - Density: 17.0/km^{2} (44.0/sq mi)
- Time zone: UTC+01:00 (CET)
  - Summer (DST): UTC+02:00 (CEST)
- INSEE/Postal code: 25447 /25690
- ^{1} French Land Register data, which excludes lakes, ponds, glaciers > 1 km^{2} (0.386 sq mi or 247 acres) and river estuaries.

Passonfontaine (French pronunciation: [pasɔ̃fɔ̃tɛn]) is a commune in the Doubs department in the Bourgogne-Franche-Comté region in eastern France.

== Population ==
Historical population
Year	Pop.	±% p.a.
1968	290	—
1975	229	−3.32%
1982	217	−0.77%
1990	193	−1.45%
1999	227	+1.82%
2007	274	+2.38%
2012	294	+1.42%
2017	325	+2.03%
2023	331	+0.31%
Source: INSEE

== See also ==
- Communes of the Doubs department
