= Chamesey =

- Commune
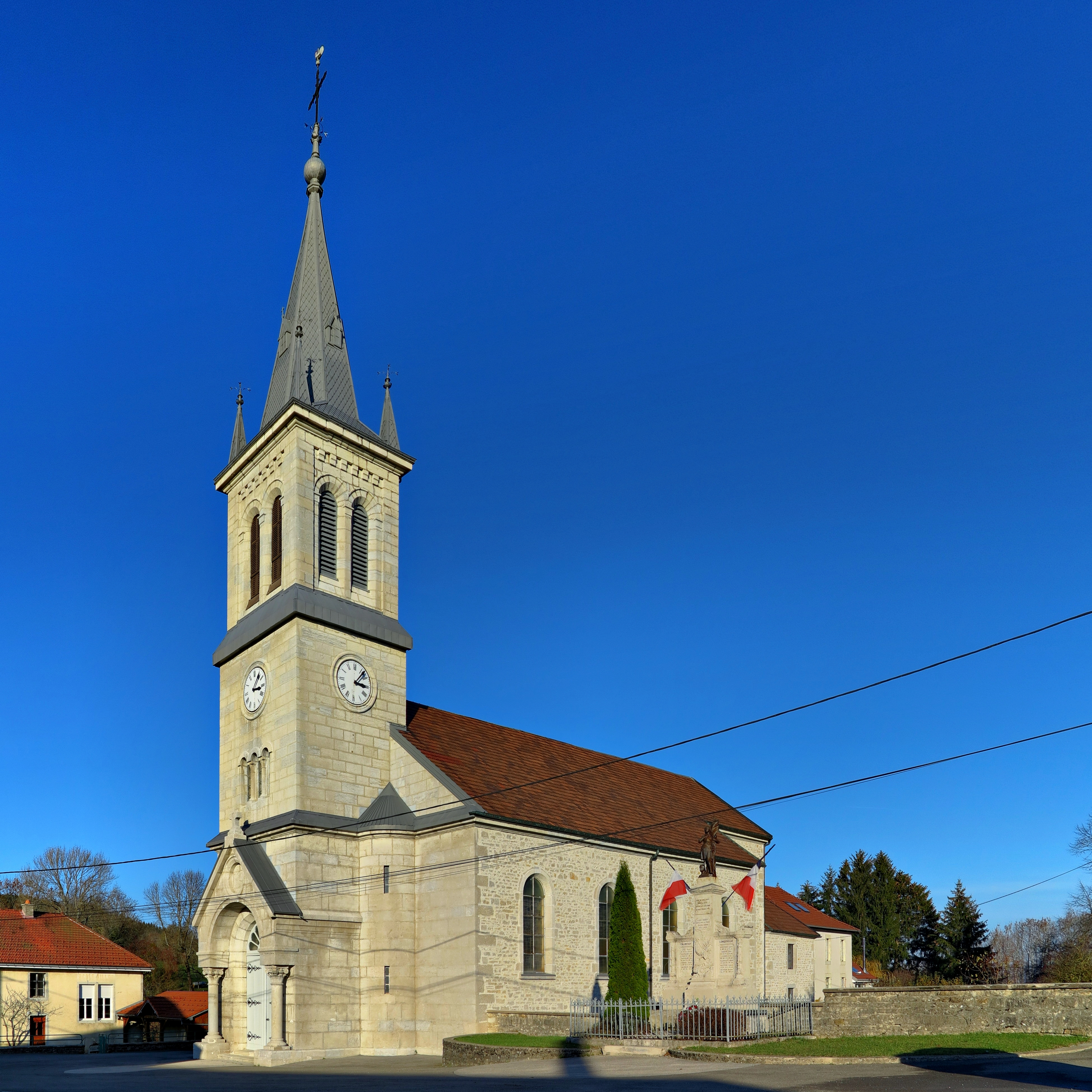
- The church in Chamesey
- Location of Chamesey
- Location within France Location within Bourgogne-Franche-Comté
- Coordinates: 47°14′15″N 6°39′00″E
- Country: France
- Region: Bourgogne-Franche-Comté
- Department: Doubs
- Arrondissement: Pontarlier
- Canton: Valdahon

Government
  - Mayor (2020–2026): Johann Devaux
- Area^{1}: 6.42 km^{2} (2.48 sq mi)
- Highest elevation: 865 m (2,838 ft)
- Lowest elevation: 688 m (2,257 ft)
- Population (2023): 143
  - Density: 22.3/km^{2} (57.7/sq mi)
- Time zone: UTC+01:00 (CET)
  - Summer (DST): UTC+02:00 (CEST)
- INSEE/Postal code: 25113 /25380
- ^{1} French Land Register data, which excludes lakes, ponds, glaciers > 1 km^{2} (0.386 sq mi or 247 acres) and river estuaries.

Chamesey (French pronunciation: [ʃamzɛ]) is a commune in the Doubs department in the Bourgogne-Franche-Comté region in eastern France. The village is home to approximately 142 residents, a historical landmark of the region is an 18th-century church and several traditional stone buildings that enhance its cultural charm.

== Population ==
Historical population
Year	Pop.	±% p.a.
1968	151	—
1975	124	−2.78%
1982	111	−1.57%
1990	105	−0.69%
1999	101	−0.43%
2007	114	+1.52%
2012	120	+1.03%
2017	136	+2.53%
2023	143	+0.84%
Source: INSEE

== See also ==
- Communes of the Doubs department
