= Battenans-Varin =

- Commune
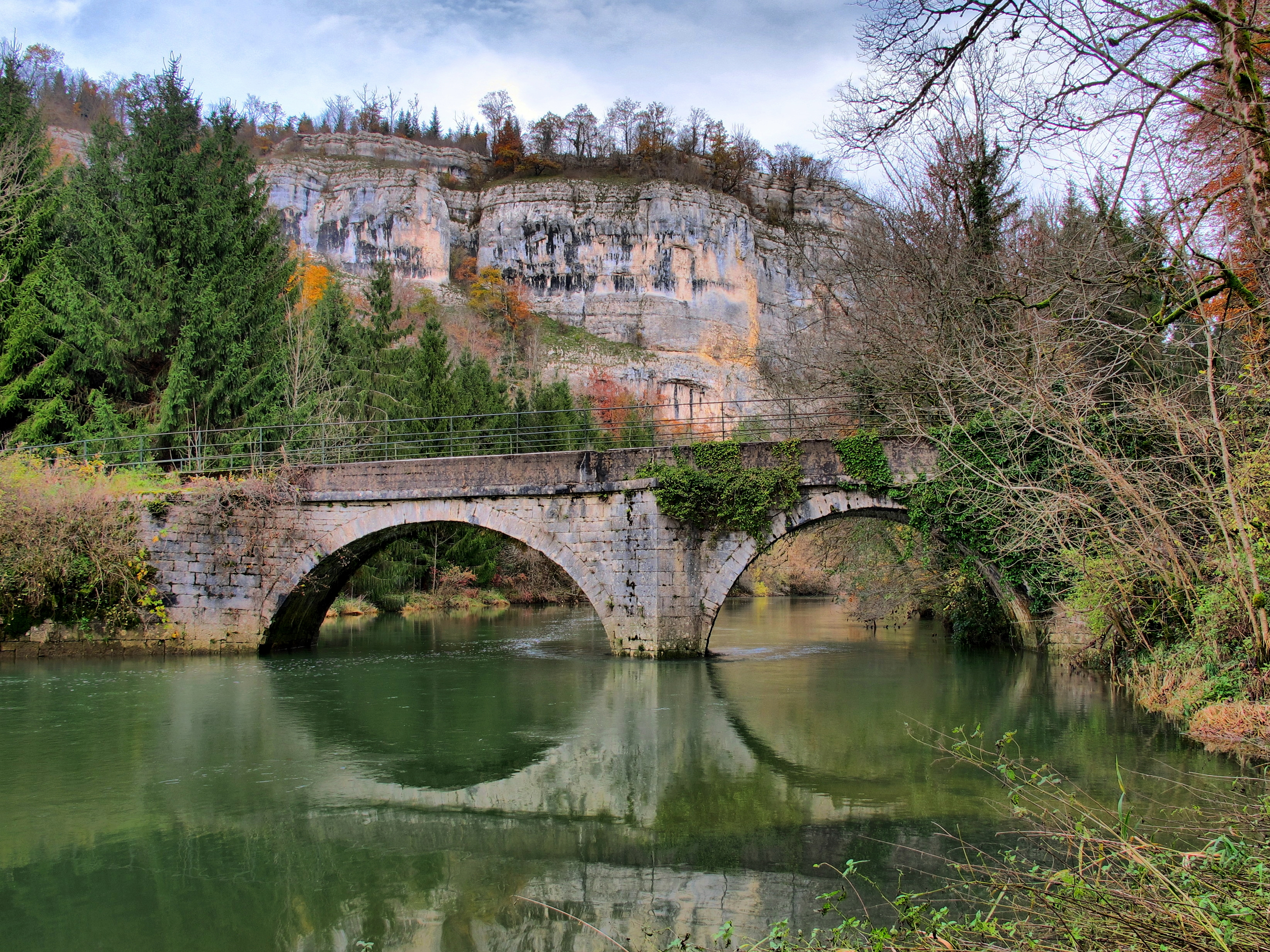
- The bridge over the Dessoubre river in Battenans-Varin
- Location of Battenans-Varin
- Location within France Location within Bourgogne-Franche-Comté
- Coordinates: 47°14′59″N 6°42′46″E
- Country: France
- Region: Bourgogne-Franche-Comté
- Department: Doubs
- Arrondissement: Montbéliard
- Canton: Valdahon

Government
  - Mayor (2020–2026): Christel Pillot
- Area^{1}: 6.38 km^{2} (2.46 sq mi)
- Highest elevation: 740 m (2,430 ft)
- Lowest elevation: 408 m (1,339 ft)
- Population (2023): 79
  - Density: 12/km^{2} (32/sq mi)
- Time zone: UTC+01:00 (CET)
  - Summer (DST): UTC+02:00 (CEST)
- INSEE/Postal code: 25046 /25380
- ^{1} French Land Register data, which excludes lakes, ponds, glaciers > 1 km^{2} (0.386 sq mi or 247 acres) and river estuaries.

Battenans-Varin (French pronunciation: [batnɑ̃ vaʁɛ̃]) is a commune in the Doubs department in the Bourgogne-Franche-Comté region in eastern France.

== Population ==
Historical population
Year	Pop.	±% p.a.
1968	106	—
1975	78	−4.29%
1982	58	−4.14%
1990	64	+1.24%
1999	56	−1.47%
2007	52	−0.92%
2012	78	+8.45%
2017	76	−0.52%
2023	79	+0.65%
Source: INSEE

== See also ==
- Communes of the Doubs department
