= Orsans, Doubs =

Orsans
- Commune
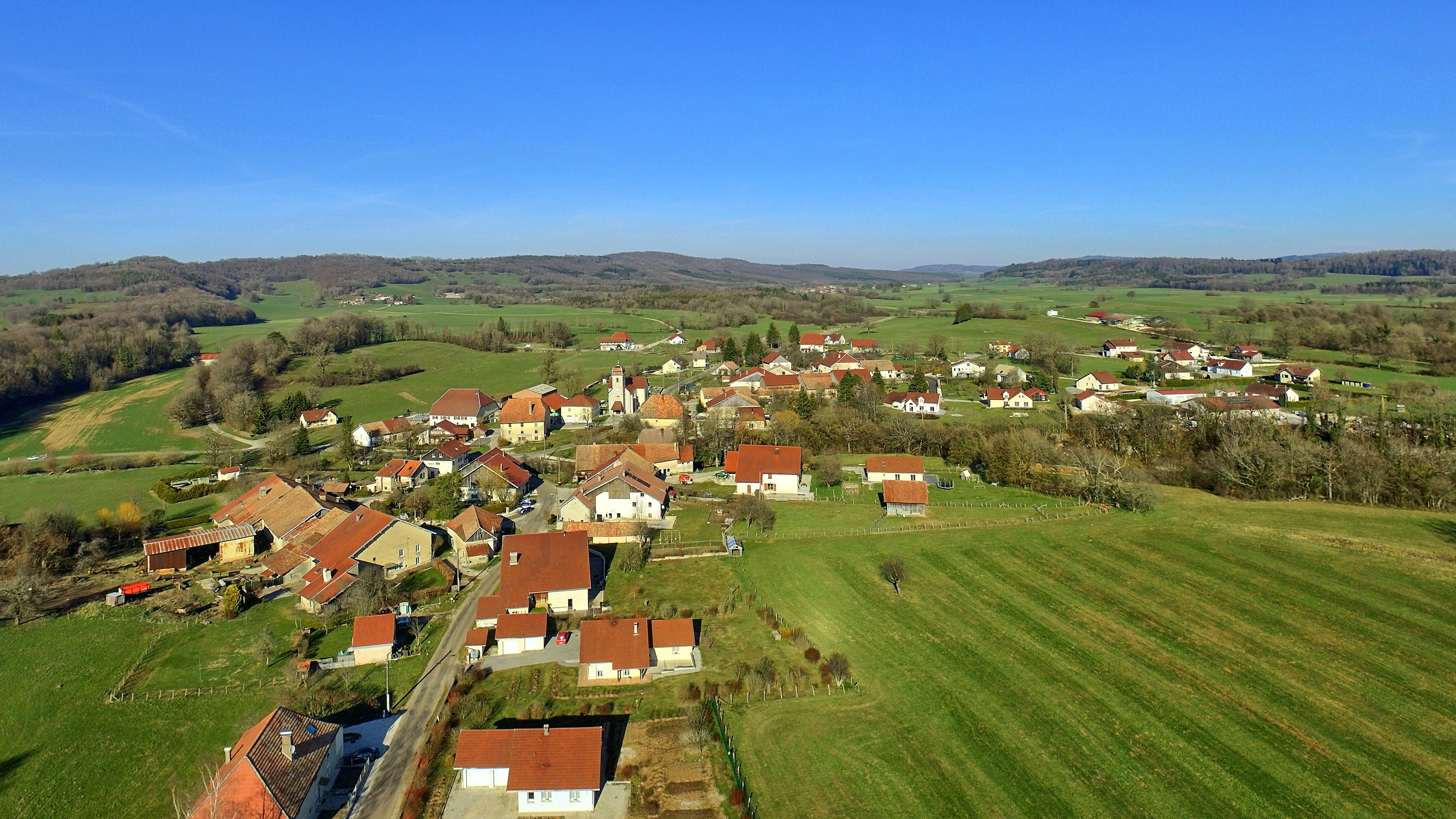
- A general view of Orsans

- Coat of arms
- Location of Orsans
- Location within France Location within Bourgogne-Franche-Comté
- Coordinates: 47°14′54″N 6°23′23″E
- Country: France
- Region: Bourgogne-Franche-Comté
- Department: Doubs
- Arrondissement: Pontarlier
- Canton: Valdahon
- Intercommunality: Portes du Haut-Doubs

Government
  - Mayor (2020–2026): Philippe Brisebard
- Area^{1}: 8.29 km^{2} (3.20 sq mi)
- Highest elevation: 630 m (2,070 ft)
- Lowest elevation: 500 m (1,600 ft)
- Population (2023): 179
  - Density: 21.6/km^{2} (55.9/sq mi)
- Time zone: UTC+01:00 (CET)
  - Summer (DST): UTC+02:00 (CEST)
- INSEE/Postal code: 25435 /25530
- ^{1} French Land Register data, which excludes lakes, ponds, glaciers > 1 km^{2} (0.386 sq mi or 247 acres) and river estuaries.

Orsans (French pronunciation: [ɔʁsɑ̃]) is a commune in the Doubs department in the Bourgogne-Franche-Comté region in eastern France.

== Population ==
Historical population
Year	Pop.	±% p.a.
1968	129	—
1975	112	−2.00%
1982	116	+0.50%
1990	102	−1.59%
1999	125	+2.29%
2007	153	+2.56%
2012	164	+1.40%
2017	163	−0.12%
2023	179	+1.57%
Source: INSEE

== See also ==
- Communes of the Doubs department
