= Provenchère, Doubs =

Provenchère
- Commune
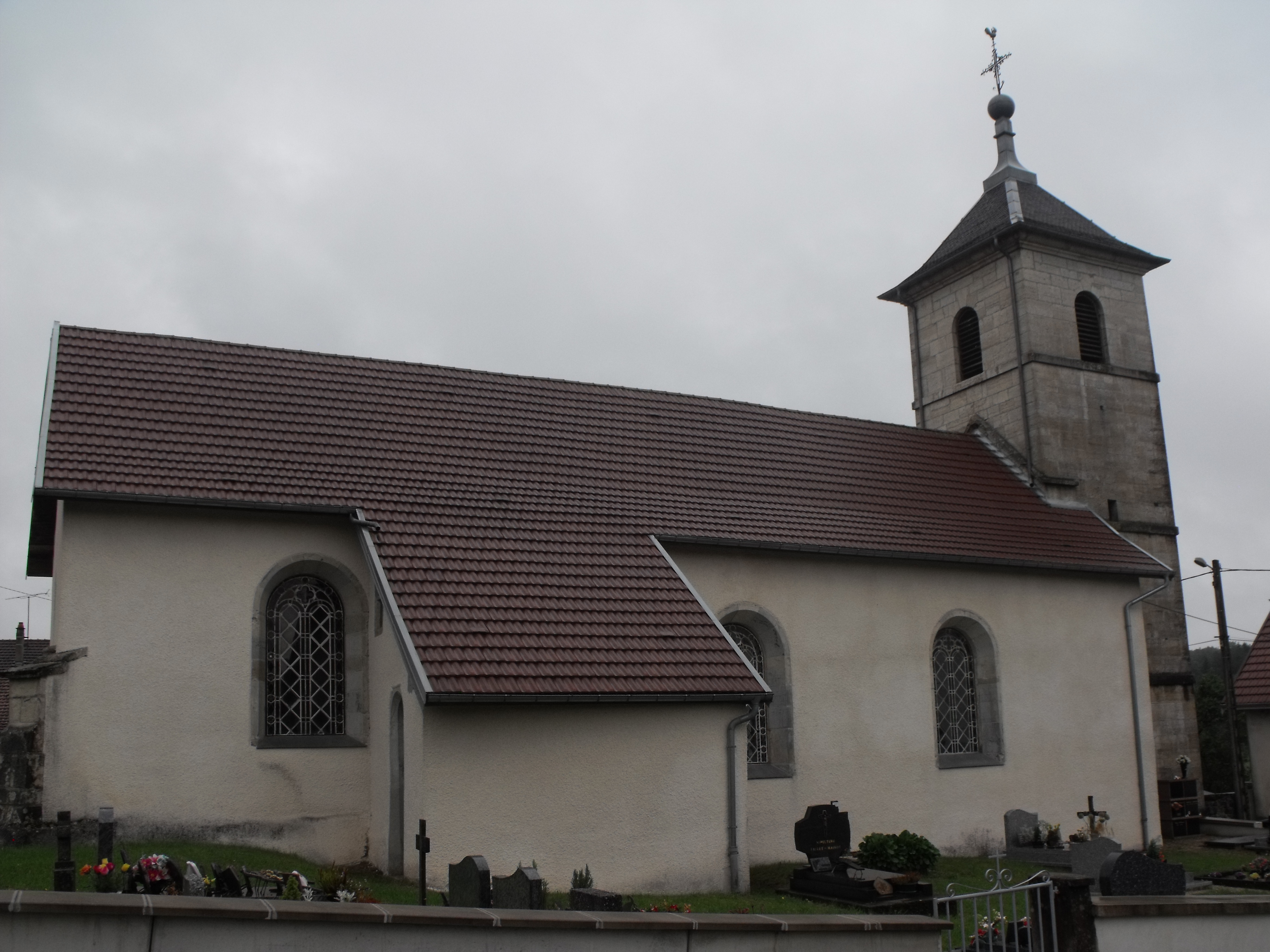
- The church in Provenchère
- Location of Provenchère
- Location within France Location within Bourgogne-Franche-Comté
- Coordinates: 47°17′24″N 6°38′40″E
- Country: France
- Region: Bourgogne-Franche-Comté
- Department: Doubs
- Arrondissement: Montbéliard
- Canton: Valdahon

Government
  - Mayor (2020–2026): Charles Schelle
- Area^{1}: 6.97 km^{2} (2.69 sq mi)
- Highest elevation: 841 m (2,759 ft)
- Lowest elevation: 560 m (1,840 ft)
- Population (2023): 142
  - Density: 20.4/km^{2} (52.8/sq mi)
- Time zone: UTC+01:00 (CET)
  - Summer (DST): UTC+02:00 (CEST)
- INSEE/Postal code: 25471 /25380
- ^{1} French Land Register data, which excludes lakes, ponds, glaciers > 1 km^{2} (0.386 sq mi or 247 acres) and river estuaries.

Provenchère (French pronunciation: [pʁɔvɑ̃ʃɛʁ]) is a commune in the Doubs department in the Bourgogne-Franche-Comté region in eastern France.

== Geography ==
The commune lies 57 km (35 mi) northeast of Besançon, perched above the valley of the Barbèche at the foot of the Mont de Fonteny.

== Population ==
Historical population
Year	Pop.	±% p.a.
1968	164	—
1975	147	−1.55%
1982	149	+0.19%
1990	127	−1.98%
1999	120	−0.63%
2007	113	−0.75%
2012	131	+3.00%
2017	135	+0.60%
2023	142	+0.85%
Source: INSEE

== See also ==
- Communes of the Doubs department
