= La Sommette =

- Commune
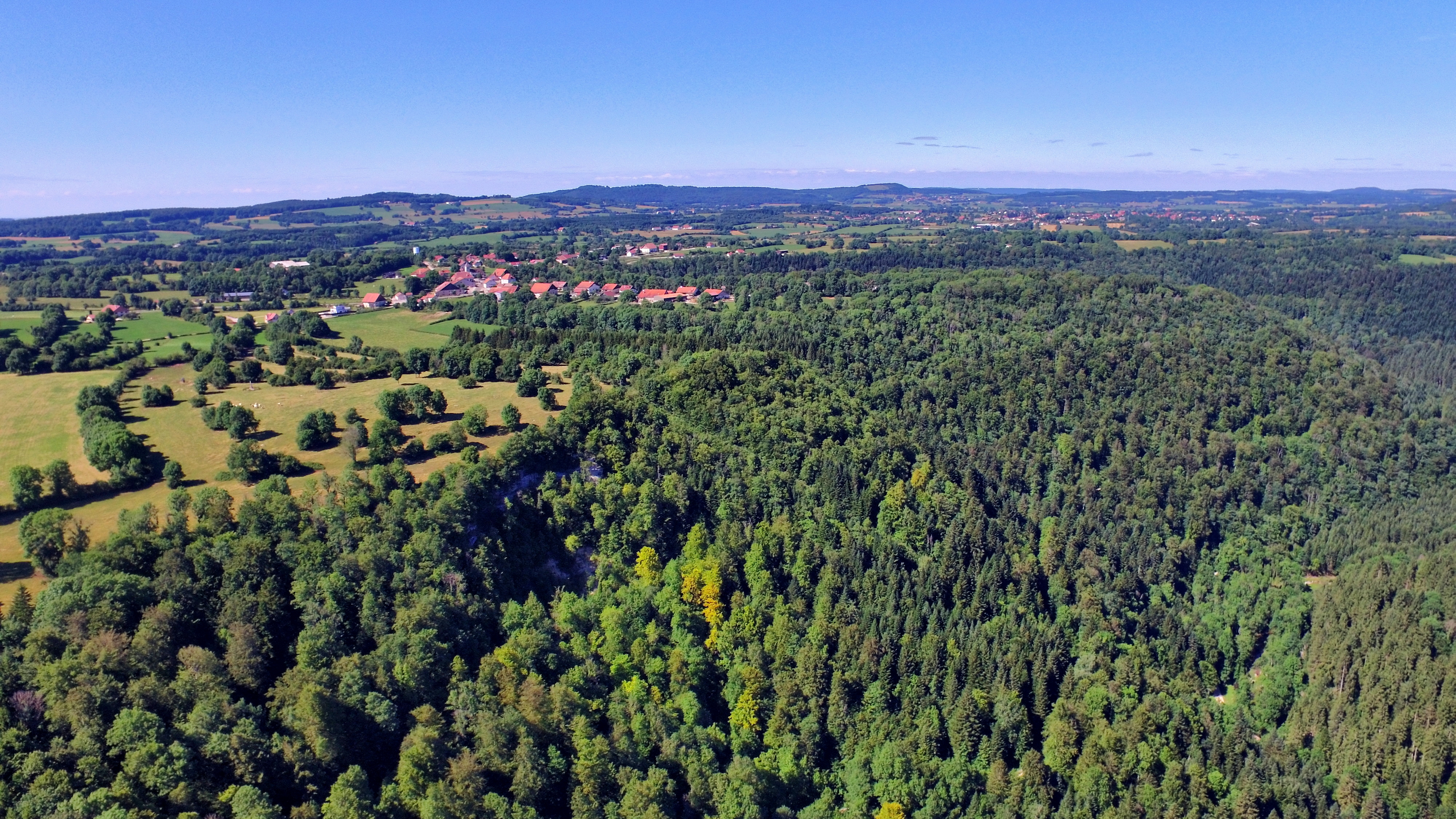
- A general view of La Sommette

- Coat of arms
- Location of La Sommette
- Location within France Location within Bourgogne-Franche-Comté
- Coordinates: 47°11′35″N 6°30′41″E
- Country: France
- Region: Bourgogne-Franche-Comté
- Department: Doubs
- Arrondissement: Pontarlier
- Canton: Valdahon
- Intercommunality: Portes du Haut-Doubs

Government
  - Mayor (2020–2026): Serge Gorius
- Area^{1}: 7.37 km^{2} (2.85 sq mi)
- Highest elevation: 732 m (2,402 ft)
- Lowest elevation: 525 m (1,722 ft)
- Population (2023): 238
  - Density: 32.3/km^{2} (83.6/sq mi)
- Time zone: UTC+01:00 (CET)
  - Summer (DST): UTC+02:00 (CEST)
- INSEE/Postal code: 25550 /25510
- ^{1} French Land Register data, which excludes lakes, ponds, glaciers > 1 km^{2} (0.386 sq mi or 247 acres) and river estuaries.

La Sommette (French pronunciation: [la sɔmɛt]) is a commune in the Doubs department in the Bourgogne-Franche-Comté region in eastern France.

== Geography ==
The commune lies 4 km (2.5 mi) southeast of Pierrefontaine above the gorges of Réverotte.

== Population ==
Historical population
Year	Pop.	±% p.a.
1968	103	—
1975	104	+0.14%
1982	121	+2.19%
1990	135	+1.38%
1999	129	−0.50%
2007	179	+4.18%
2012	216	+3.83%
2017	236	+1.79%
2023	238	+0.14%
Source: INSEE

== See also ==
- Communes of the Doubs department
