= Épenouse =

- Commune
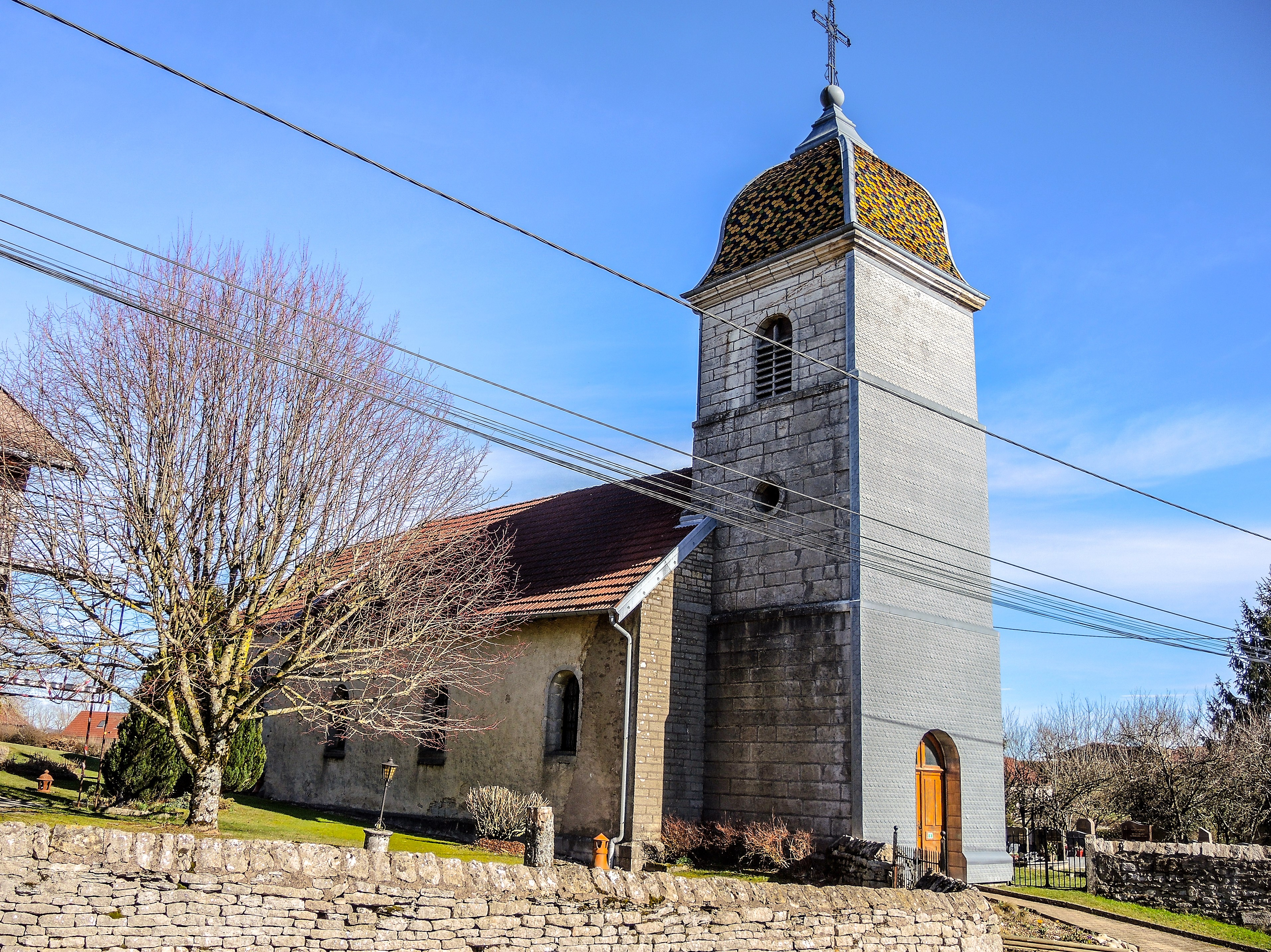
- The church in Épenouse
- Location of Épenouse
- Location within France Location within Bourgogne-Franche-Comté
- Coordinates: 47°12′55″N 6°24′09″E
- Country: France
- Region: Bourgogne-Franche-Comté
- Department: Doubs
- Arrondissement: Pontarlier
- Canton: Valdahon

Government
  - Mayor (2023–2026): Christine Curty
- Area^{1}: 5.75 km^{2} (2.22 sq mi)
- Elevation: 650 m (2,130 ft)
- Highest elevation: 672 m (2,205 ft)
- Lowest elevation: 546 m (1,791 ft)
- Population (2023): 167
  - Density: 29.0/km^{2} (75.2/sq mi)
- Time zone: UTC+01:00 (CET)
  - Summer (DST): UTC+02:00 (CEST)
- INSEE/Postal code: 25218 /25530
- ^{1} French Land Register data, which excludes lakes, ponds, glaciers > 1 km^{2} (0.386 sq mi or 247 acres) and river estuaries.

Épenouse (French pronunciation: [ep(ə)nuz]) is a commune in the Doubs department in the Bourgogne-Franche-Comté region in eastern France.

== Population ==
Historical population
| Year | Pop. | ±% p.a. |
|---|---|---|
| 1968 | 96 | — |
| 1975 | 104 | +1.15% |
| 1982 | 85 | −2.84% |
| 1990 | 93 | +1.13% |
| 1999 | 88 | −0.61% |
| 2007 | 126 | +4.59% |
| 2012 | 136 | +1.54% |
| 2017 | 151 | +2.11% |
| 2023 | 167 | +1.69% |
Source: INSEE

== See also ==
- Communes of the Doubs department
