= Ouvans =

- Commune
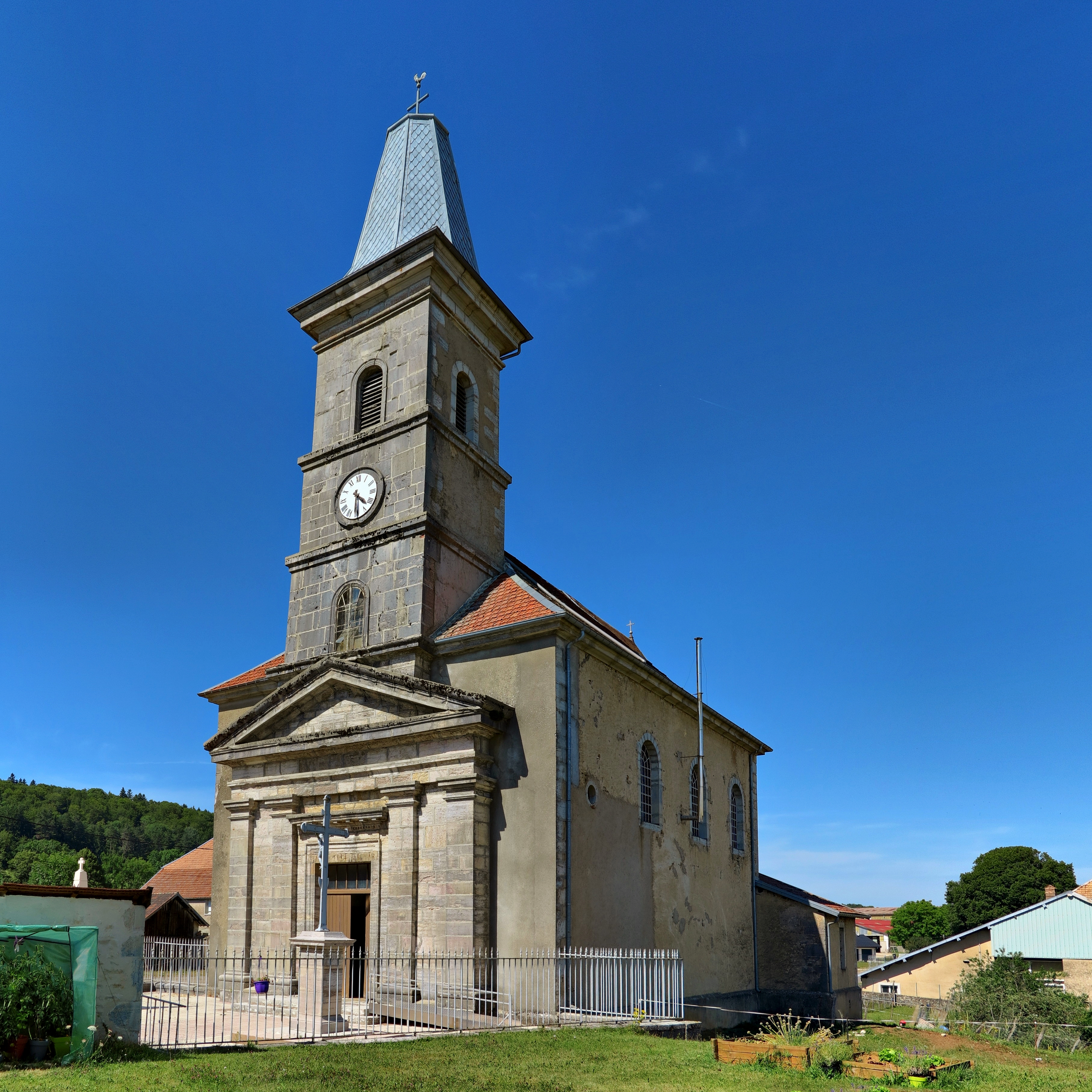
- The church in Ouvans
- Location of Ouvans
- Location within France Location within Bourgogne-Franche-Comté
- Coordinates: 47°16′37″N 6°29′04″E
- Country: France
- Region: Bourgogne-Franche-Comté
- Department: Doubs
- Arrondissement: Pontarlier
- Canton: Valdahon

Government
  - Mayor (2020–2026): Marie-Jeanne Dromard
- Area^{1}: 5.2 km^{2} (2.0 sq mi)
- Highest elevation: 785 m (2,575 ft)
- Lowest elevation: 604 m (1,982 ft)
- Population (2023): 68
  - Density: 13/km^{2} (34/sq mi)
- Time zone: UTC+01:00 (CET)
  - Summer (DST): UTC+02:00 (CEST)
- INSEE/Postal code: 25441 /25530
- ^{1} French Land Register data, which excludes lakes, ponds, glaciers > 1 km^{2} (0.386 sq mi or 247 acres) and river estuaries.

Ouvans (French pronunciation: [uvɑ̃]) is a commune in the Doubs department in the Bourgogne-Franche-Comté region in eastern France.

== Population ==
Historical population
Year	Pop.	±% p.a.
1968	70	—
1975	65	−1.05%
1982	64	−0.22%
1990	58	−1.22%
1999	70	+2.11%
2007	52	−3.65%
2012	82	+9.54%
2017	60	−6.06%
2023	68	+2.11%
Source: INSEE

== See also ==
- Communes of the Doubs department
