= Villers-la-Combe =

- Commune
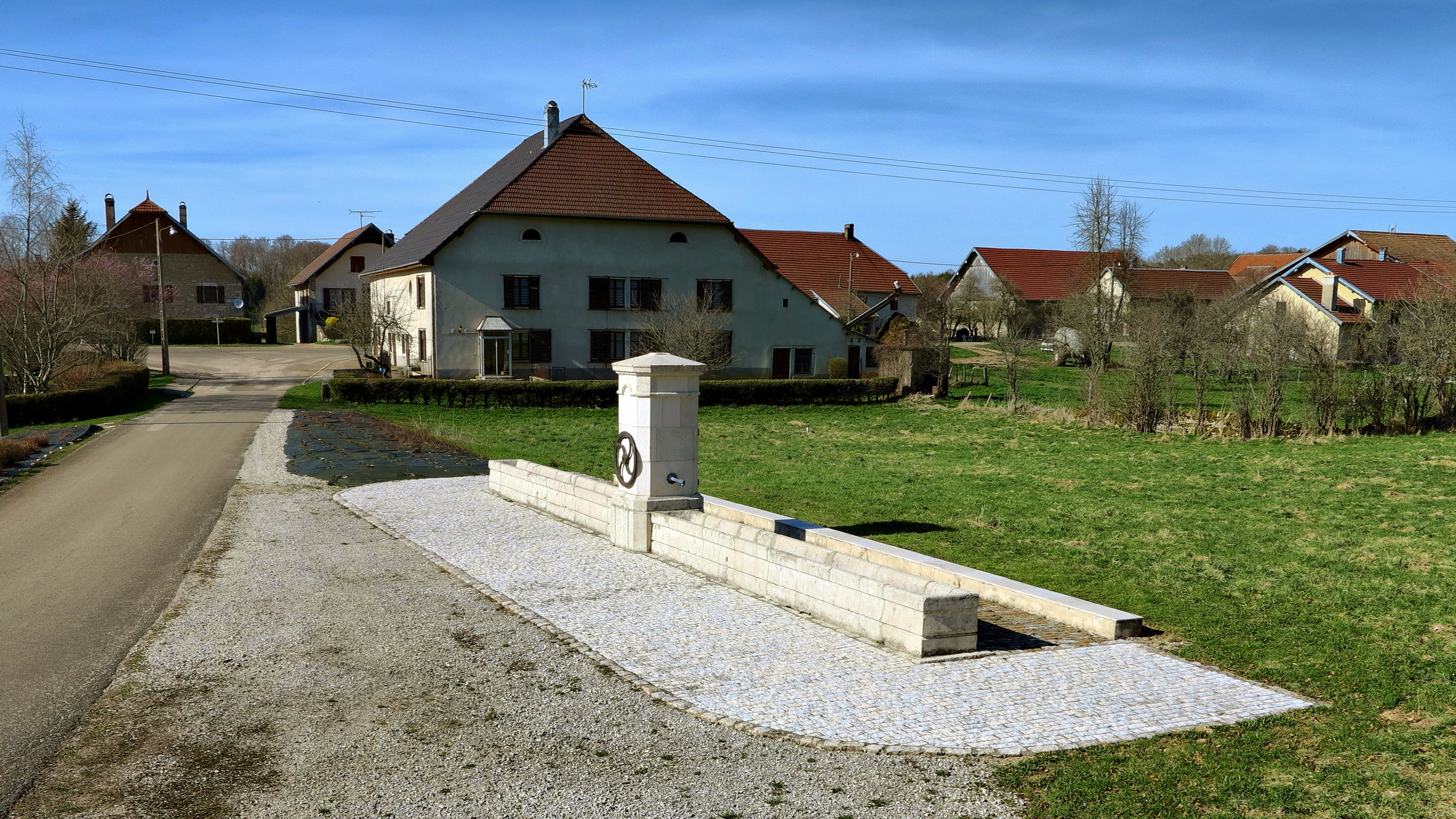
- The fountain in Villers-la-Combe
- Location of Villers-la-Combe
- Location within France Location within Bourgogne-Franche-Comté
- Coordinates: 47°14′10″N 6°27′25″E
- Country: France
- Region: Bourgogne-Franche-Comté
- Department: Doubs
- Arrondissement: Pontarlier
- Canton: Valdahon

Government
  - Mayor (2020–2026): Raymond Bassignot
- Area^{1}: 5.88 km^{2} (2.27 sq mi)
- Highest elevation: 823 m (2,700 ft)
- Lowest elevation: 617 m (2,024 ft)
- Population (2023): 49
  - Density: 8.3/km^{2} (22/sq mi)
- Time zone: UTC+01:00 (CET)
  - Summer (DST): UTC+02:00 (CEST)
- INSEE/Postal code: 25625 /25510
- ^{1} French Land Register data, which excludes lakes, ponds, glaciers > 1 km^{2} (0.386 sq mi or 247 acres) and river estuaries.

Villers-la-Combe (French pronunciation: [vilɛʁ la kɔ̃b]) is a commune in the Doubs department in the Bourgogne-Franche-Comté region in eastern France.

== Population ==
Historical population
Year	Pop.	±% p.a.
1968	80	—
1975	71	−1.69%
1982	60	−2.38%
1990	50	−2.25%
1999	48	−0.45%
2007	52	+1.01%
2012	48	−1.59%
2017	51	+1.22%
2023	49	−0.66%
Source: INSEE

== See also ==
- Communes of the Doubs department
