= Plaimbois-Vennes =

- Commune
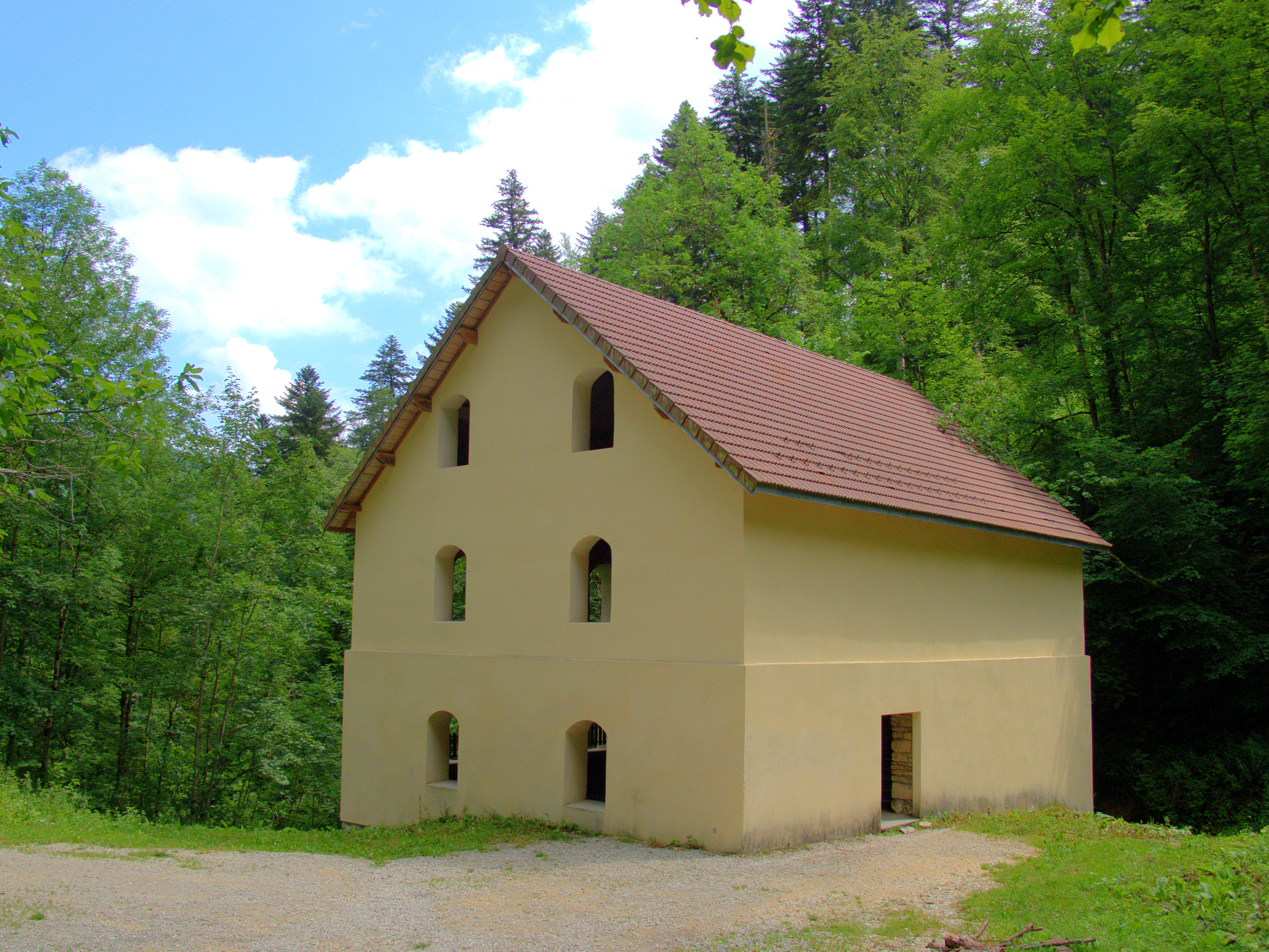
- The Vermondans mill in Plaimbois-Vennes
- Location of Plaimbois-Vennes
- Location within France Location within Bourgogne-Franche-Comté
- Coordinates: 47°11′05″N 6°32′29″E
- Country: France
- Region: Bourgogne-Franche-Comté
- Department: Doubs
- Arrondissement: Pontarlier
- Canton: Valdahon

Government
  - Mayor (2020–2026): Charline Cassard
- Area^{1}: 10.8 km^{2} (4.2 sq mi)
- Highest elevation: 1,003 m (3,291 ft)
- Lowest elevation: 470 m (1,540 ft)
- Population (2023): 113
  - Density: 10.5/km^{2} (27.1/sq mi)
- Time zone: UTC+01:00 (CET)
  - Summer (DST): UTC+02:00 (CEST)
- INSEE/Postal code: 25457 /25390
- ^{1} French Land Register data, which excludes lakes, ponds, glaciers > 1 km^{2} (0.386 sq mi or 247 acres) and river estuaries.

Plaimbois-Vennes (French pronunciation: [plɛ̃bwa vɛn]) is a commune in the Doubs department in the Bourgogne-Franche-Comté region in eastern France.

== Population ==
Historical population
Year	Pop.	±% p.a.
1968	75	—
1975	65	−2.02%
1982	53	−2.87%
1990	53	+0.00%
1999	66	+2.47%
2007	72	+1.09%
2012	90	+4.56%
2017	102	+2.53%
2023	113	+1.72%
Source: INSEE

== See also ==
- Communes of the Doubs department
