= Germéfontaine =

- Commune
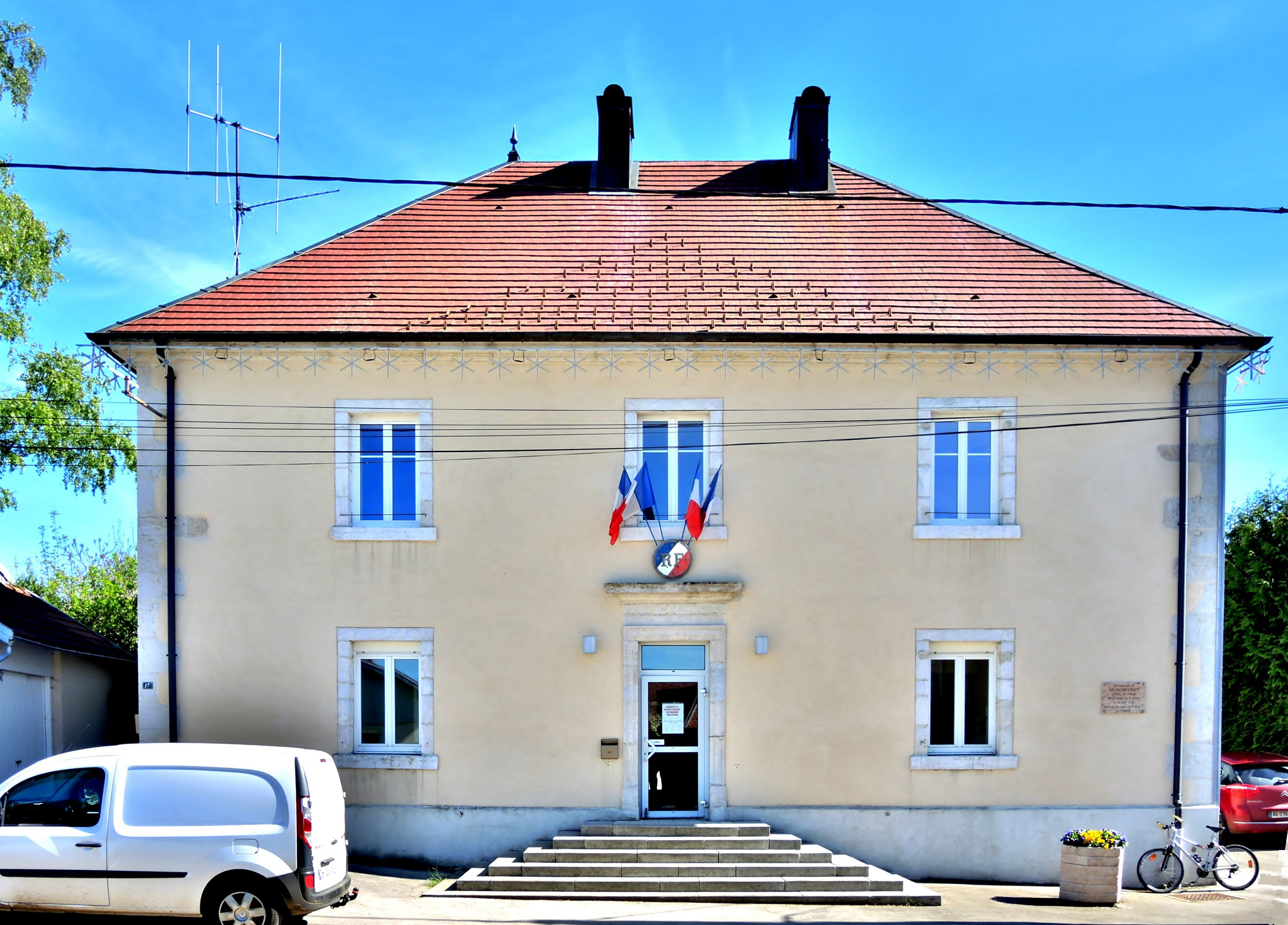
- The town hall in Germéfontaine
- Location of Germéfontaine
- Location within France Location within Bourgogne-Franche-Comté
- Coordinates: 47°13′33″N 6°28′05″E
- Country: France
- Region: Bourgogne-Franche-Comté
- Department: Doubs
- Arrondissement: Pontarlier
- Canton: Valdahon
- Intercommunality: Portes du Haut-Doubs

Government
  - Mayor (2020–2026): Béatrice Trouillot
- Area^{1}: 11.16 km^{2} (4.31 sq mi)
- Highest elevation: 821 m (2,694 ft)
- Lowest elevation: 649 m (2,129 ft)
- Population (2023): 121
  - Density: 10.8/km^{2} (28.1/sq mi)
- Time zone: UTC+01:00 (CET)
  - Summer (DST): UTC+02:00 (CEST)
- INSEE/Postal code: 25268 /25510
- ^{1} French Land Register data, which excludes lakes, ponds, glaciers > 1 km^{2} (0.386 sq mi or 247 acres) and river estuaries.

Germéfontaine (French pronunciation: [ʒɛʁmefɔ̃tɛn]) is a commune in the Doubs department in the Bourgogne-Franche-Comté region in eastern France.

== Population ==
Historical population
| Year | Pop. | ±% p.a. |
|---|---|---|
| 1968 | 161 | — |
| 1975 | 162 | +0.09% |
| 1982 | 139 | −2.16% |
| 1990 | 111 | −2.77% |
| 1999 | 100 | −1.15% |
| 2007 | 115 | +1.76% |
| 2012 | 129 | +2.32% |
| 2017 | 122 | −1.11% |
| 2023 | 121 | −0.14% |
Source: INSEE

== See also ==
- Communes of the Doubs department
