= Eysson =

- Commune
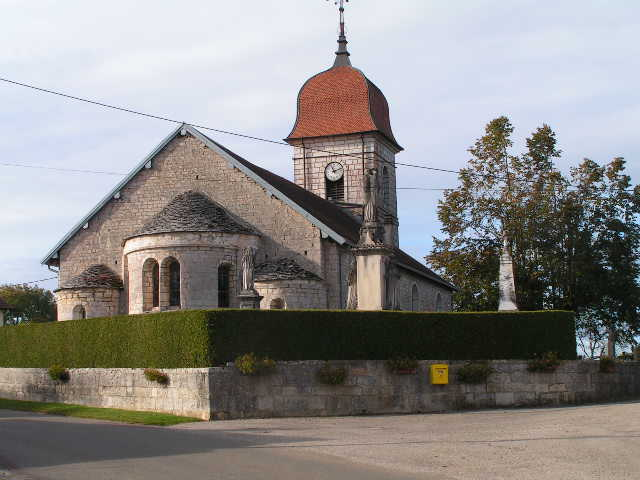
- The church in Eysson
- Location of Eysson
- Location within France Location within Bourgogne-Franche-Comté
- Coordinates: 47°12′01″N 6°25′52″E
- Country: France
- Region: Bourgogne-Franche-Comté
- Department: Doubs
- Arrondissement: Pontarlier
- Canton: Valdahon

Government
  - Mayor (2020–2026): Hervé Bouhelier
- Area^{1}: 6.01 km^{2} (2.32 sq mi)
- Highest elevation: 740 m (2,430 ft)
- Lowest elevation: 552 m (1,811 ft)
- Population (2023): 121
  - Density: 20.1/km^{2} (52.1/sq mi)
- Time zone: UTC+01:00 (CET)
  - Summer (DST): UTC+02:00 (CEST)
- INSEE/Postal code: 25231 /25530
- ^{1} French Land Register data, which excludes lakes, ponds, glaciers > 1 km^{2} (0.386 sq mi or 247 acres) and river estuaries.

Eysson (French pronunciation: [ɛsɔ̃]) is a commune in the Doubs department in the Bourgogne-Franche-Comté region in eastern France.

== Population ==
Historical population
Year	Pop.	±% p.a.
1968	88	—
1975	94	+0.95%
1982	103	+1.31%
1990	92	−1.40%
1999	75	−2.24%
2007	85	+1.58%
2012	99	+3.10%
2017	116	+3.22%
2023	121	+0.71%
Source: INSEE

== See also ==
- Communes of the Doubs department
