= Guyans-Vennes =

- Commune
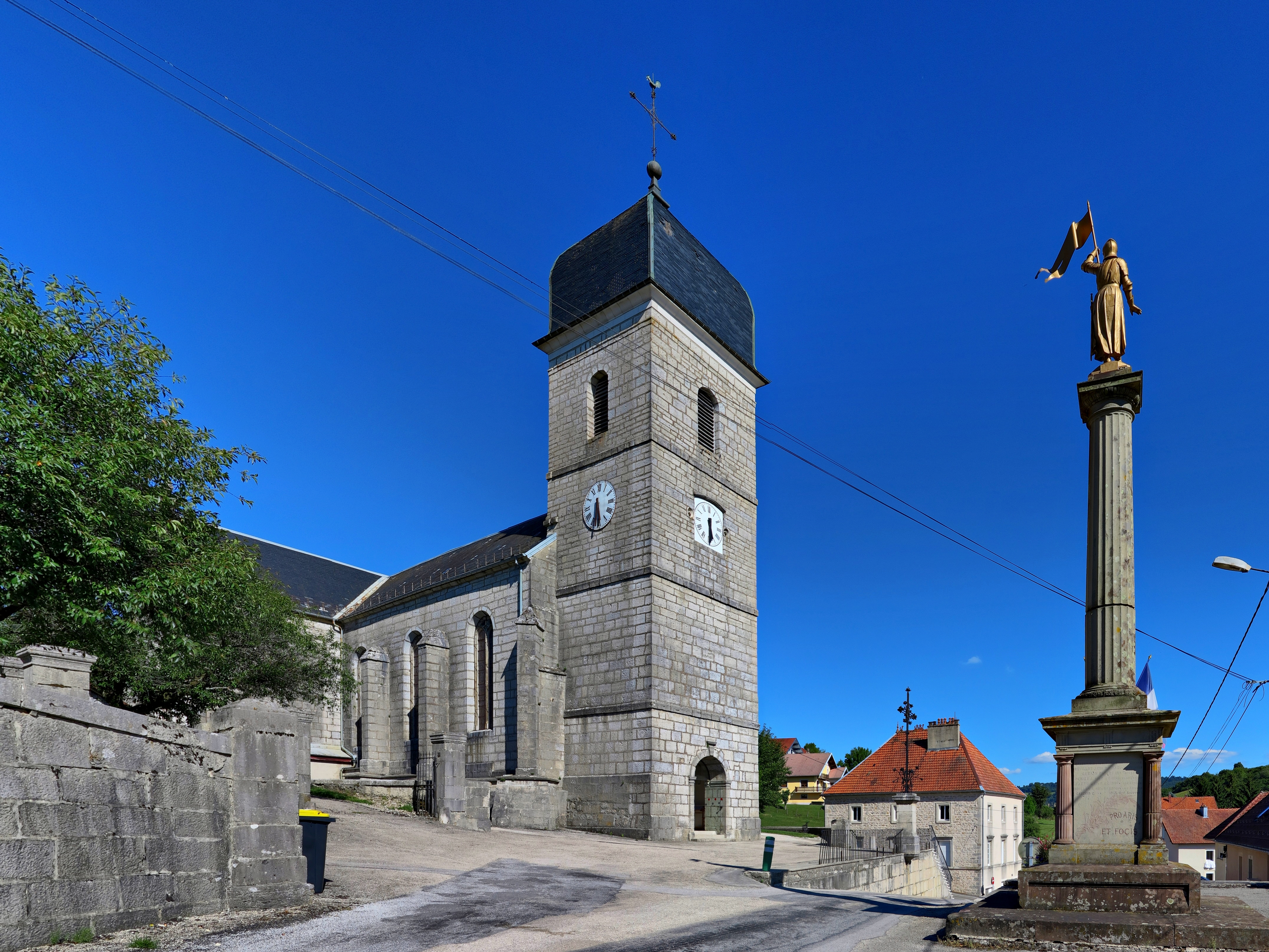
- The church in Guyans-Vennes
- Location of Guyans-Vennes
- Location within France Location within Bourgogne-Franche-Comté
- Coordinates: 47°09′26″N 6°34′18″E
- Country: France
- Region: Bourgogne-Franche-Comté
- Department: Doubs
- Arrondissement: Pontarlier
- Canton: Valdahon

Government
  - Mayor (2020–2026): Pierre Magnin-Feysot
- Area^{1}: 19.67 km^{2} (7.59 sq mi)
- Highest elevation: 984 m (3,228 ft)
- Lowest elevation: 540 m (1,770 ft)
- Population (2023): 838
  - Density: 42.6/km^{2} (110/sq mi)
- Time zone: UTC+01:00 (CET)
  - Summer (DST): UTC+02:00 (CEST)
- INSEE/Postal code: 25301 /25390
- ^{1} French Land Register data, which excludes lakes, ponds, glaciers > 1 km^{2} (0.386 sq mi or 247 acres) and river estuaries.

Guyans-Vennes (French pronunciation: [ɡɥijɑ̃ vɛn]) is a commune in the Doubs department in the Bourgogne-Franche-Comté region in eastern France.

== Population ==
Historical population
Year	Pop.	±% p.a.
1968	499	—
1975	532	+0.92%
1982	530	−0.05%
1990	536	+0.14%
1999	575	+0.78%
2007	680	+2.12%
2012	781	+2.81%
2017	829	+1.20%
2023	838	+0.18%
Source: INSEE

== See also ==
- Communes of the Doubs department
