= Consolation-Maisonnettes =

- Commune
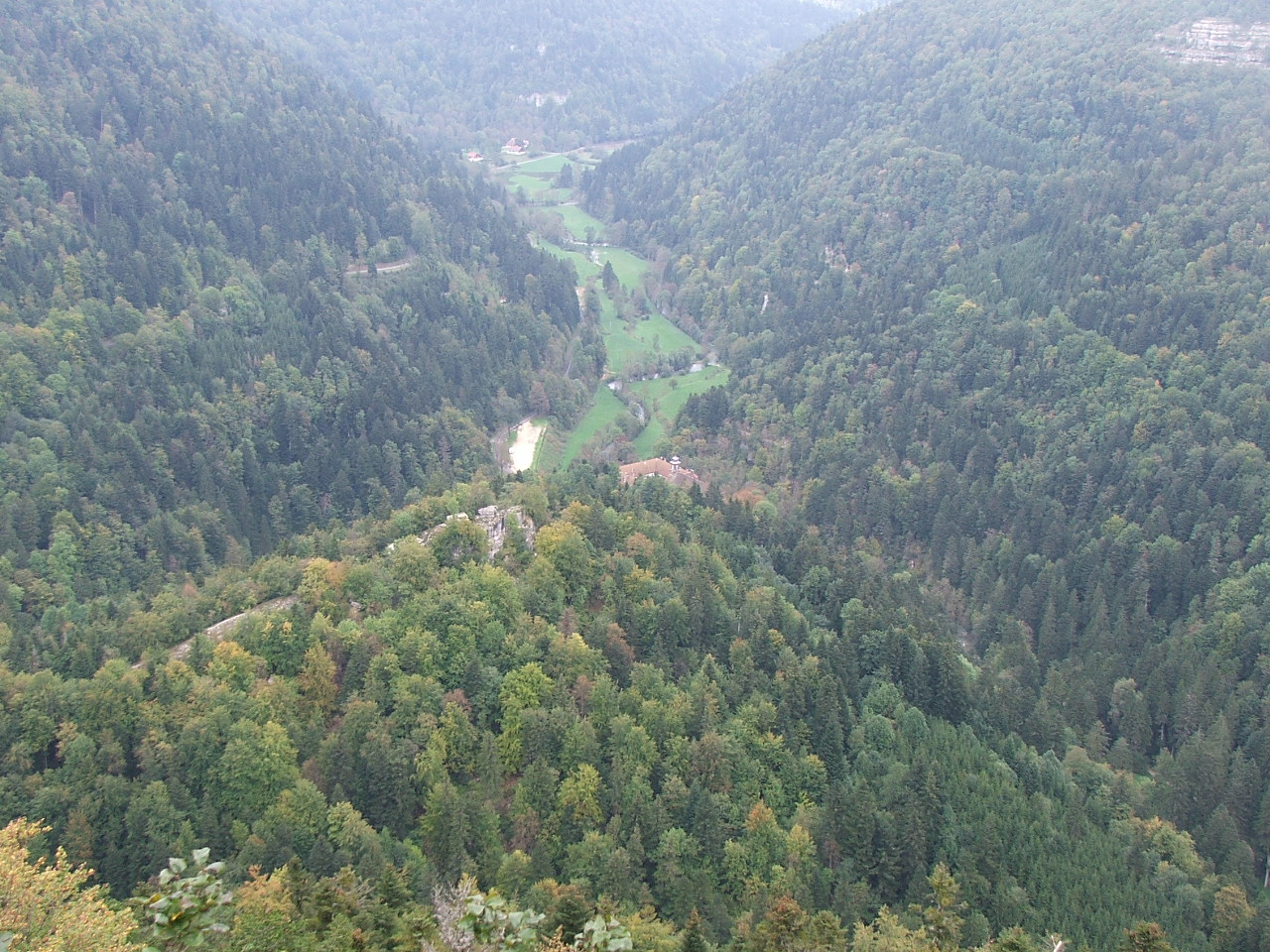
- The valley of Consolation
- Location of Consolation-Maisonnettes
- Location within France Location within Bourgogne-Franche-Comté
- Coordinates: 47°09′30″N 6°36′23″E
- Country: France
- Region: Bourgogne-Franche-Comté
- Department: Doubs
- Arrondissement: Pontarlier
- Canton: Valdahon

Government
  - Mayor (2020–2026): Jean-Claude Joly
- Area^{1}: 4.31 km^{2} (1.66 sq mi)
- Highest elevation: 880 m (2,890 ft)
- Lowest elevation: 495 m (1,624 ft)
- Population (2023): 23
  - Density: 5.3/km^{2} (14/sq mi)
- Time zone: UTC+01:00 (CET)
  - Summer (DST): UTC+02:00 (CEST)
- INSEE/Postal code: 25161 /25390
- ^{1} French Land Register data, which excludes lakes, ponds, glaciers > 1 km^{2} (0.386 sq mi or 247 acres) and river estuaries.

Consolation-Maisonnettes (French pronunciation: [kɔ̃sɔlasjɔ̃ mɛzɔnɛt]) is a commune in the Doubs department in the Bourgogne-Franche-Comté region in eastern France.

== Population ==
Historical population
Year	Pop.	±% p.a.
1968	63	—
1975	47	−4.10%
1982	36	−3.74%
1990	29	−2.67%
1999	46	+5.26%
2007	27	−6.44%
2012	31	+2.80%
2017	33	+1.26%
2023	23	−5.84%
Source: INSEE

== See also ==
- Communes of the Doubs department
