= Étray =

- Commune
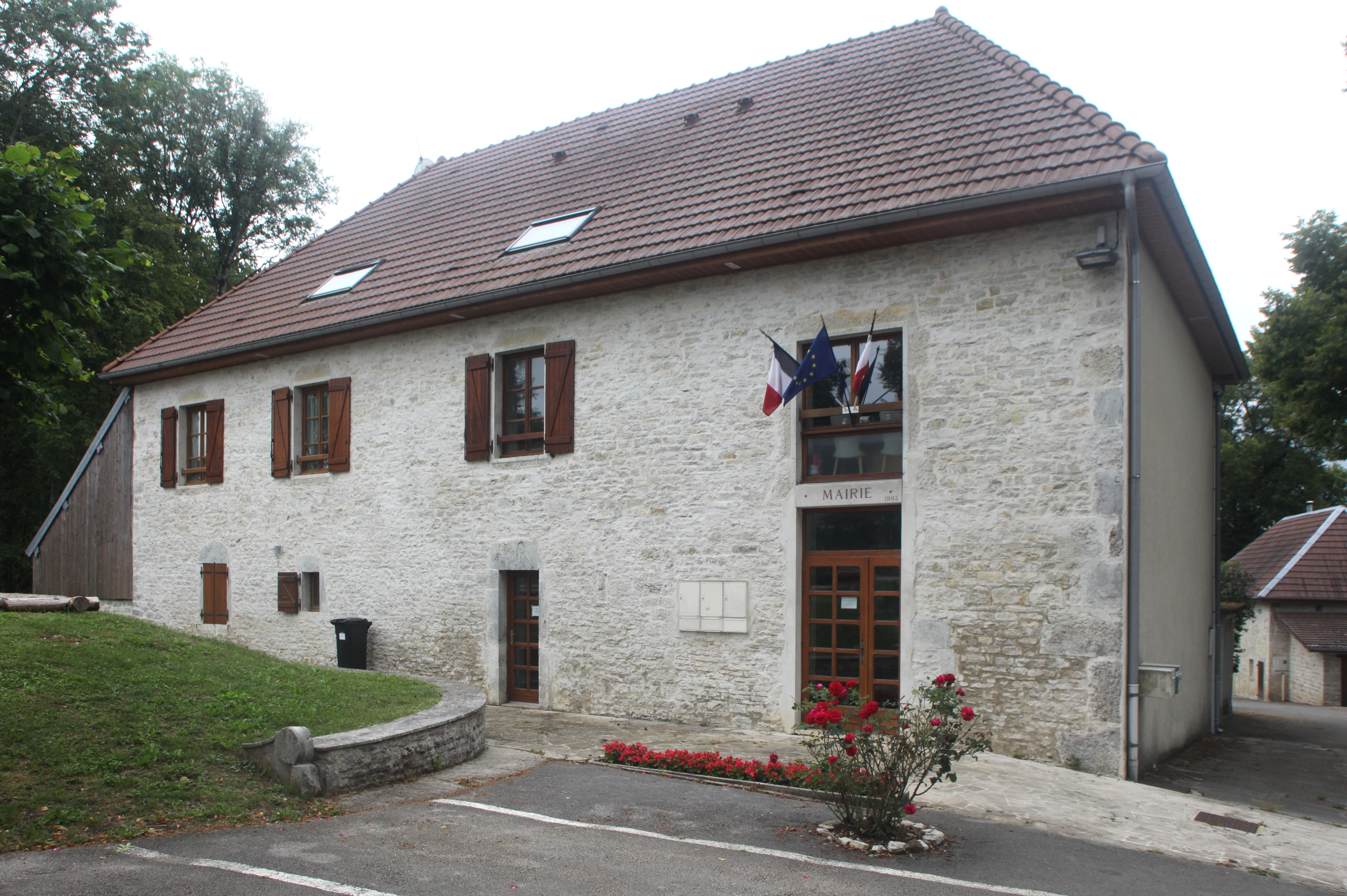
- The town hall in Étray

- Coat of arms
- Location of Étray
- Location within France Location within Bourgogne-Franche-Comté
- Coordinates: 47°07′26″N 6°20′37″E
- Country: France
- Region: Bourgogne-Franche-Comté
- Department: Doubs
- Arrondissement: Pontarlier
- Canton: Valdahon

Government
  - Mayor (2020–2026): Daniel Peseux
- Area^{1}: 6.0 km^{2} (2.3 sq mi)
- Highest elevation: 759 m (2,490 ft)
- Lowest elevation: 623 m (2,044 ft)
- Population (2023): 293
  - Density: 49/km^{2} (130/sq mi)
- Time zone: UTC+01:00 (CET)
  - Summer (DST): UTC+02:00 (CEST)
- INSEE/Postal code: 25227 /25800
- ^{1} French Land Register data, which excludes lakes, ponds, glaciers > 1 km^{2} (0.386 sq mi or 247 acres) and river estuaries.

Étray (French pronunciation: [etʁɛ]) is a commune in the Doubs department in the Bourgogne-Franche-Comté region in eastern France.

== Population ==
Historical population
Year	Pop.	±% p.a.
1968	109	—
1975	88	−3.01%
1982	104	+2.42%
1990	115	+1.26%
1999	132	+1.54%
2007	178	+3.81%
2012	233	+5.53%
2017	261	+2.30%
2023	293	+1.95%
Source: INSEE

== See also ==
- Communes of the Doubs department
