= Bremondans =

- Commune
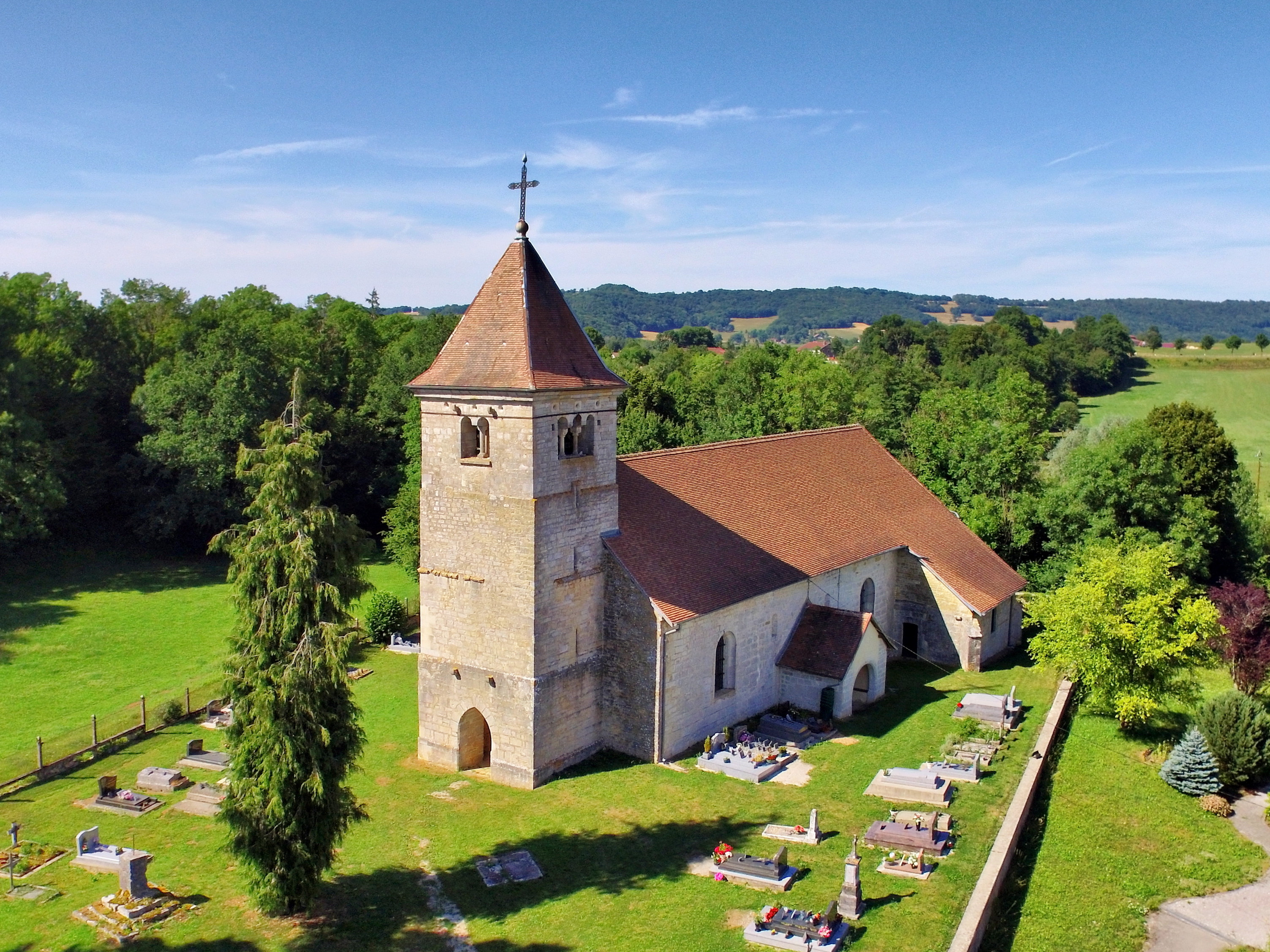
- The church in Bremondans
- Location of Bremondans
- Location within France Location within Bourgogne-Franche-Comté
- Coordinates: 47°13′55″N 6°23′55″E
- Country: France
- Region: Bourgogne-Franche-Comté
- Department: Doubs
- Arrondissement: Pontarlier
- Canton: Valdahon
- Intercommunality: Portes du Haut-Doubs

Government
  - Mayor (2020–2026): Brigitte Taillard
- Area^{1}: 7.22 km^{2} (2.79 sq mi)
- Highest elevation: 664 m (2,178 ft)
- Lowest elevation: 522 m (1,713 ft)
- Population (2023): 107
  - Density: 14.8/km^{2} (38.4/sq mi)
- Time zone: UTC+01:00 (CET)
  - Summer (DST): UTC+02:00 (CEST)
- INSEE/Postal code: 25089 /25530
- ^{1} French Land Register data, which excludes lakes, ponds, glaciers > 1 km^{2} (0.386 sq mi or 247 acres) and river estuaries.

Bremondans (French pronunciation: [bʁəmɔ̃dɑ̃]) is a commune in the Doubs department in the Bourgogne-Franche-Comté region in eastern France.

== Population ==
Historical population
Year	Pop.	±% p.a.
1968	99	—
1975	84	−2.32%
1982	75	−1.61%
1990	72	−0.51%
1999	79	+1.04%
2007	83	+0.62%
2012	84	+0.24%
2017	86	+0.47%
2023	107	+3.71%
Source: INSEE

== See also ==
- Communes of the Doubs department
