= Cour-Saint-Maurice =

- Commune
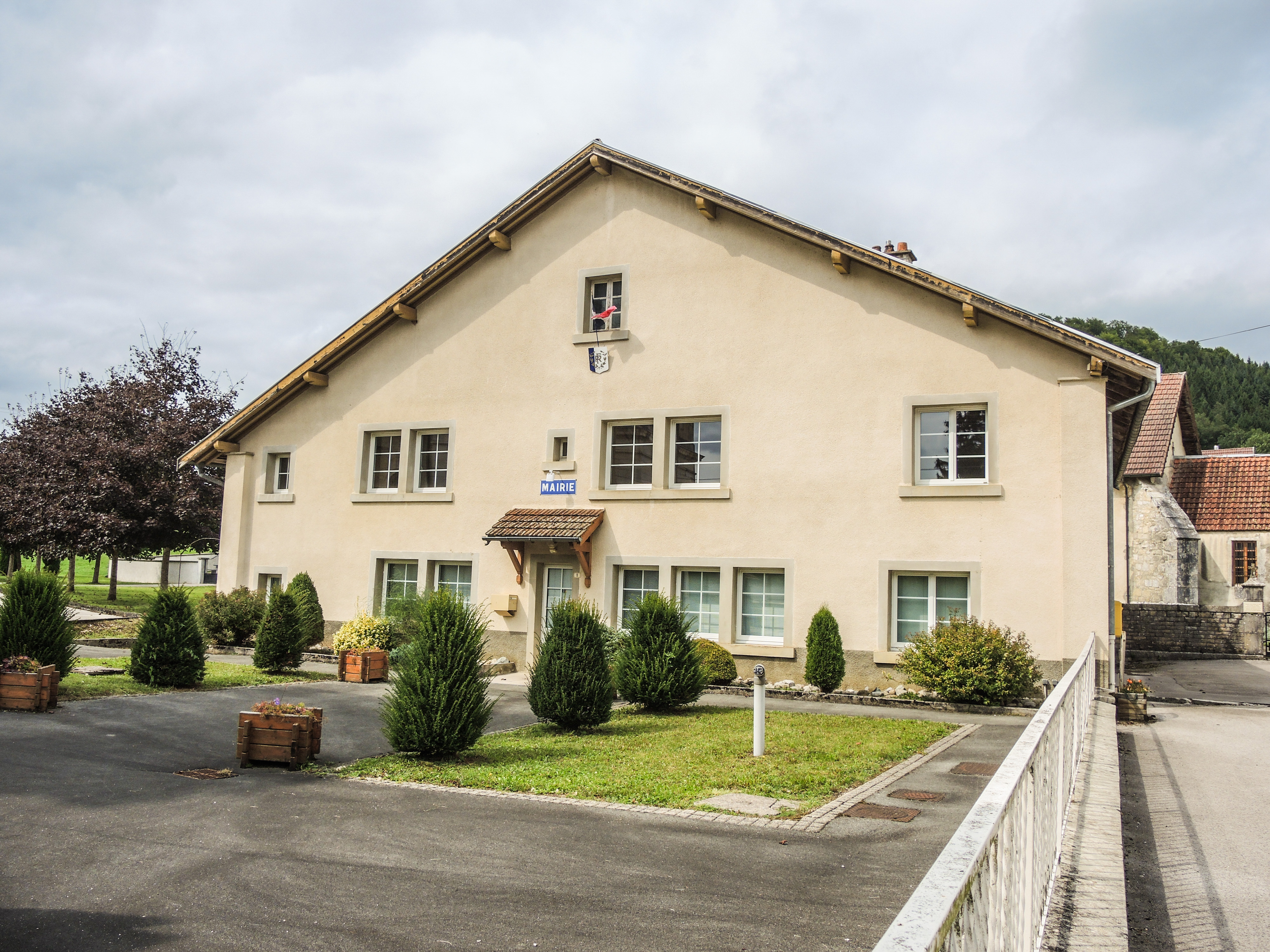
- The town hall in Cour-Saint-Maurice
- Location of Cour-Saint-Maurice
- Location within France Location within Bourgogne-Franche-Comté
- Coordinates: 47°15′25″N 6°42′05″E
- Country: France
- Region: Bourgogne-Franche-Comté
- Department: Doubs
- Arrondissement: Montbéliard
- Canton: Valdahon

Government
  - Mayor (2020–2026): Yves-Marie Parent
- Area^{1}: 4.47 km^{2} (1.73 sq mi)
- Highest elevation: 696 m (2,283 ft)
- Lowest elevation: 406 m (1,332 ft)
- Population (2023): 147
  - Density: 32.9/km^{2} (85.2/sq mi)
- Time zone: UTC+01:00 (CET)
  - Summer (DST): UTC+02:00 (CEST)
- INSEE/Postal code: 25173 /25380
- ^{1} French Land Register data, which excludes lakes, ponds, glaciers > 1 km^{2} (0.386 sq mi or 247 acres) and river estuaries.

Cour-Saint-Maurice (French pronunciation: [kuʁ sɛ̃ mɔʁis]) is a commune in the Doubs department in the Bourgogne-Franche-Comté region in eastern France.

== Population ==
Historical population
Year	Pop.	±% p.a.
1968	203	—
1975	200	−0.21%
1982	175	−1.89%
1990	155	−1.51%
1999	157	+0.14%
2007	178	+1.58%
2012	168	−1.15%
2017	156	−1.47%
2023	147	−0.99%
Source: INSEE

== See also ==
- Communes of the Doubs department
