= Belleherbe =

- Commune
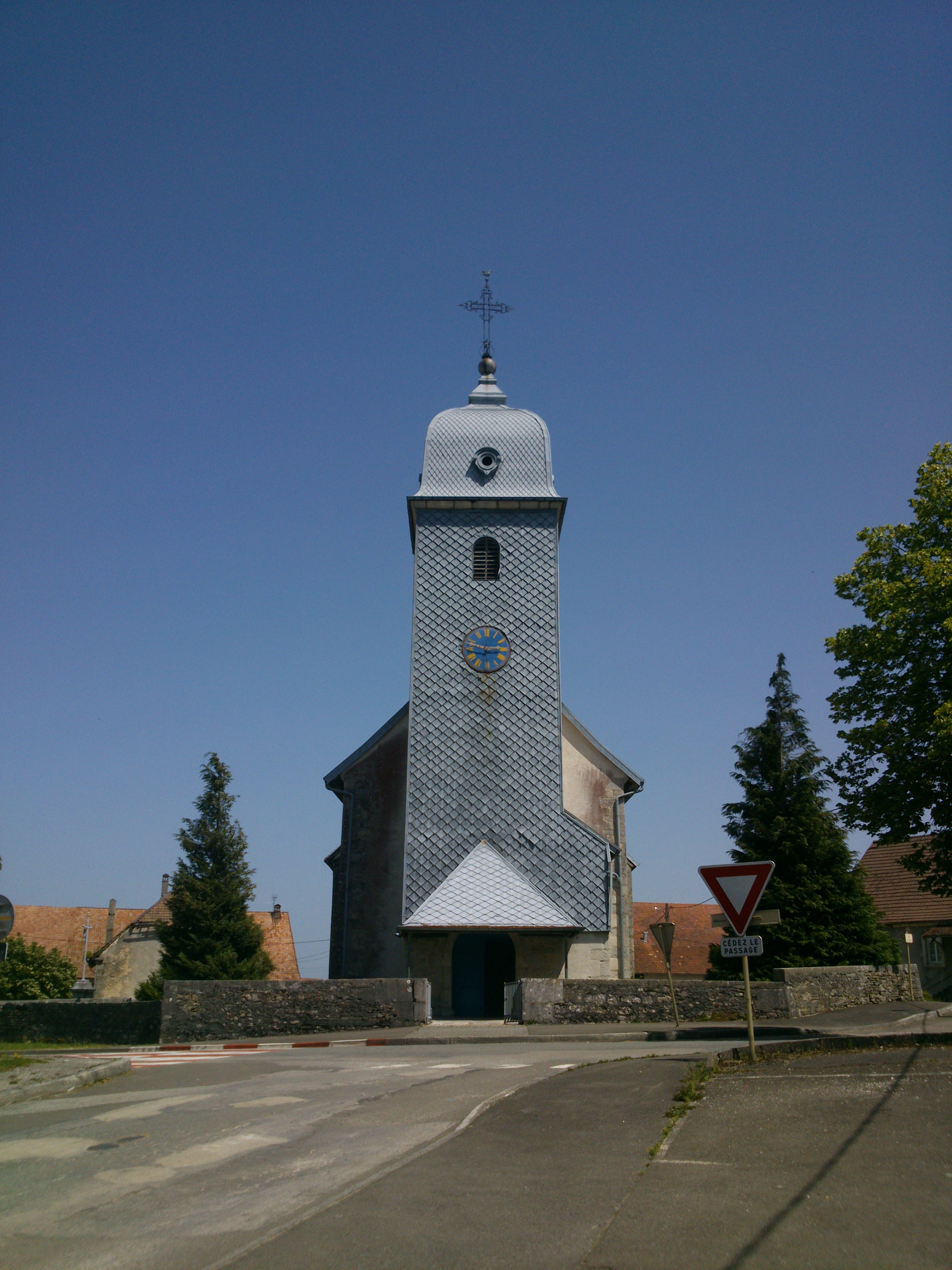
- The church in Belleherbe
- Location of Belleherbe
- Location within France Location within Bourgogne-Franche-Comté
- Coordinates: 47°15′46″N 6°39′32″E
- Country: France
- Region: Bourgogne-Franche-Comté
- Department: Doubs
- Arrondissement: Montbéliard
- Canton: Valdahon

Government
  - Mayor (2020–2026): Philippe Franchini
- Area^{1}: 16.13 km^{2} (6.23 sq mi)
- Highest elevation: 854 m (2,802 ft)
- Lowest elevation: 590 m (1,940 ft)
- Population (2023): 630
  - Density: 39/km^{2} (100/sq mi)
- Time zone: UTC+01:00 (CET)
  - Summer (DST): UTC+02:00 (CEST)
- INSEE/Postal code: 25051 /25380
- ^{1} French Land Register data, which excludes lakes, ponds, glaciers > 1 km^{2} (0.386 sq mi or 247 acres) and river estuaries.

Belleherbe (French pronunciation: [bɛl.ɛʁb]) is a commune in the Doubs department in the Bourgogne-Franche-Comté region in eastern France.

== Population ==
Historical population
Year	Pop.	±% p.a.
1968	628	—
1975	650	+0.49%
1982	617	−0.74%
1990	629	+0.24%
1999	574	−1.01%
2007	591	+0.37%
2012	587	−0.14%
2017	625	+1.26%
2023	630	+0.13%
Source: INSEE

== See also ==
- Communes of the Doubs department
