= Domprel =

- Commune
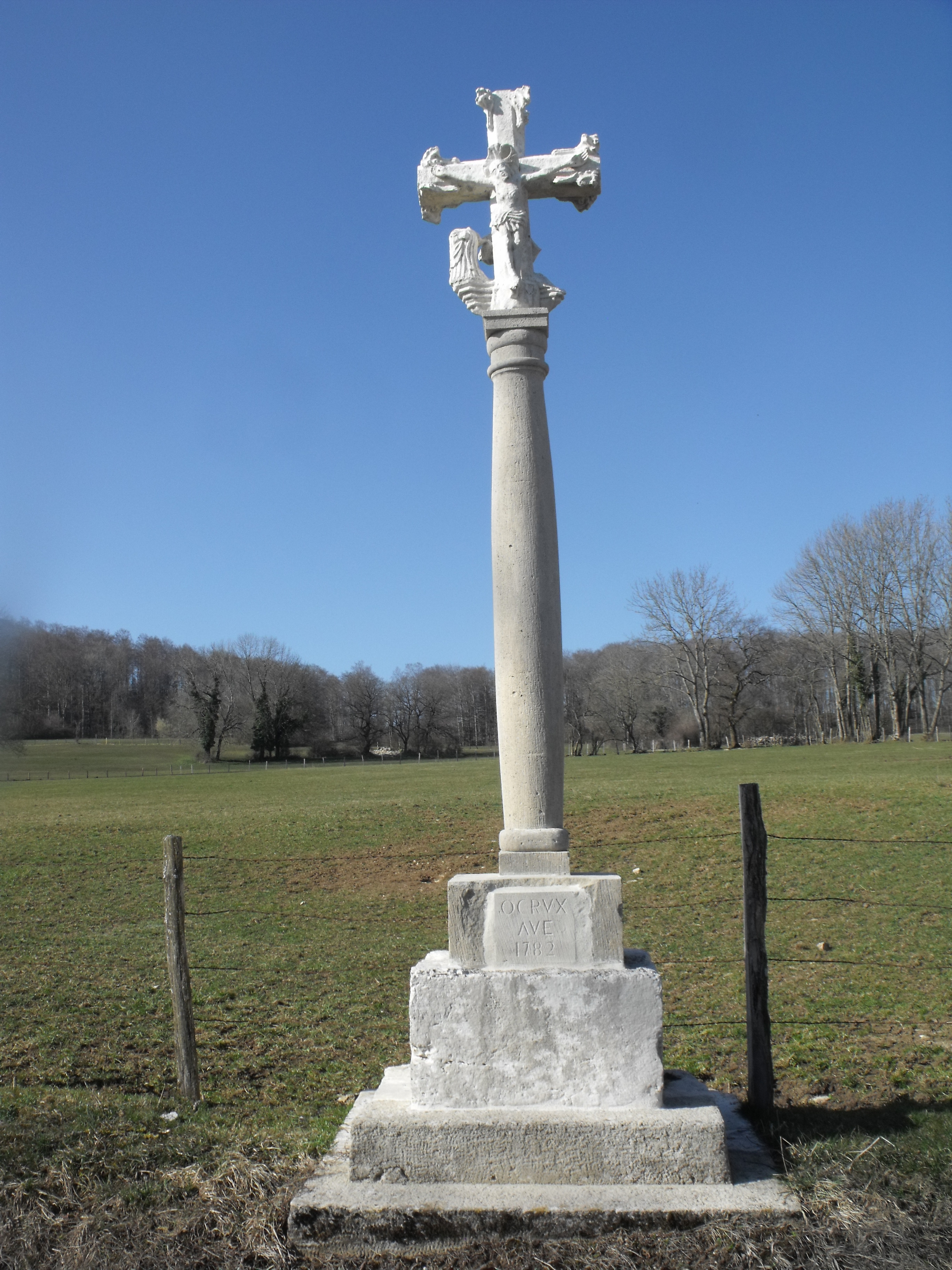
- The cross in Domprel

- Coat of arms
- Location of Domprel
- Location within France Location within Bourgogne-Franche-Comté
- Coordinates: 47°12′05″N 6°28′12″E
- Country: France
- Region: Bourgogne-Franche-Comté
- Department: Doubs
- Arrondissement: Pontarlier
- Canton: Valdahon

Government
  - Mayor (2020–2026): Michel Morel
- Area^{1}: 9.4 km^{2} (3.6 sq mi)
- Highest elevation: 789 m (2,589 ft)
- Lowest elevation: 680 m (2,230 ft)
- Population (2023): 172
  - Density: 18/km^{2} (47/sq mi)
- Time zone: UTC+01:00 (CET)
  - Summer (DST): UTC+02:00 (CEST)
- INSEE/Postal code: 25203 /25510
- ^{1} French Land Register data, which excludes lakes, ponds, glaciers > 1 km^{2} (0.386 sq mi or 247 acres) and river estuaries.

Domprel (French pronunciation: [dɔ̃pʁɛl]) is a commune in the Doubs department in the Bourgogne-Franche-Comté region in eastern France.

== Population ==
Historical population
Year	Pop.	±% p.a.
1968	185	—
1975	133	−4.60%
1982	122	−1.23%
1990	122	+0.00%
1999	127	+0.45%
2007	126	−0.10%
2012	158	+4.63%
2017	180	+2.64%
2023	172	−0.75%
Source: INSEE

== See also ==
- Communes of the Doubs department
