= Guyans-Durnes =

- Commune
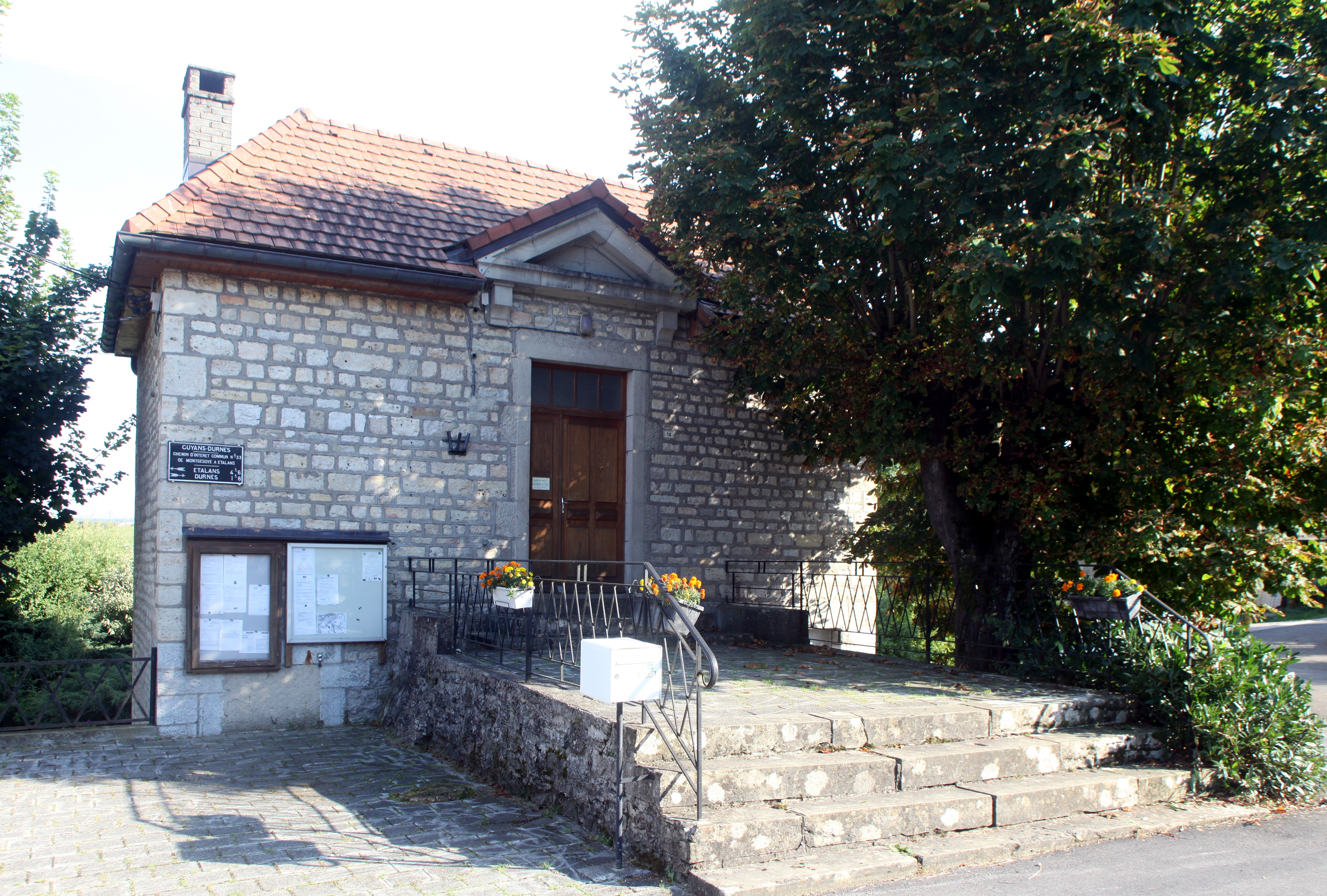
- The town hall in Guyans-Durnes
- Location of Guyans-Durnes
- Location within France Location within Bourgogne-Franche-Comté
- Coordinates: 47°07′25″N 6°14′39″E
- Country: France
- Region: Bourgogne-Franche-Comté
- Department: Doubs
- Arrondissement: Besançon
- Canton: Valdahon

Government
  - Mayor (2020–2026): Denis Donzé
- Area^{1}: 9.03 km^{2} (3.49 sq mi)
- Highest elevation: 615 m (2,018 ft)
- Lowest elevation: 520 m (1,710 ft)
- Population (2023): 318
  - Density: 35.2/km^{2} (91.2/sq mi)
- Time zone: UTC+01:00 (CET)
  - Summer (DST): UTC+02:00 (CEST)
- INSEE/Postal code: 25300 /25580
- ^{1} French Land Register data, which excludes lakes, ponds, glaciers > 1 km^{2} (0.386 sq mi or 247 acres) and river estuaries.

Guyans-Durnes (French pronunciation: [ɡɥijɑ̃ dyʁn]) is a commune in the Doubs department in the Bourgogne-Franche-Comté region in eastern France.

== Population ==
Historical population
Year	Pop.	±% p.a.
1968	123	—
1975	123	+0.00%
1982	134	+1.23%
1990	162	+2.40%
1999	156	−0.42%
2007	212	+3.91%
2012	263	+4.41%
2017	280	+1.26%
2023	318	+2.14%
Source: INSEE

== See also ==
- Communes of the Doubs department
