= Voires =

- Commune
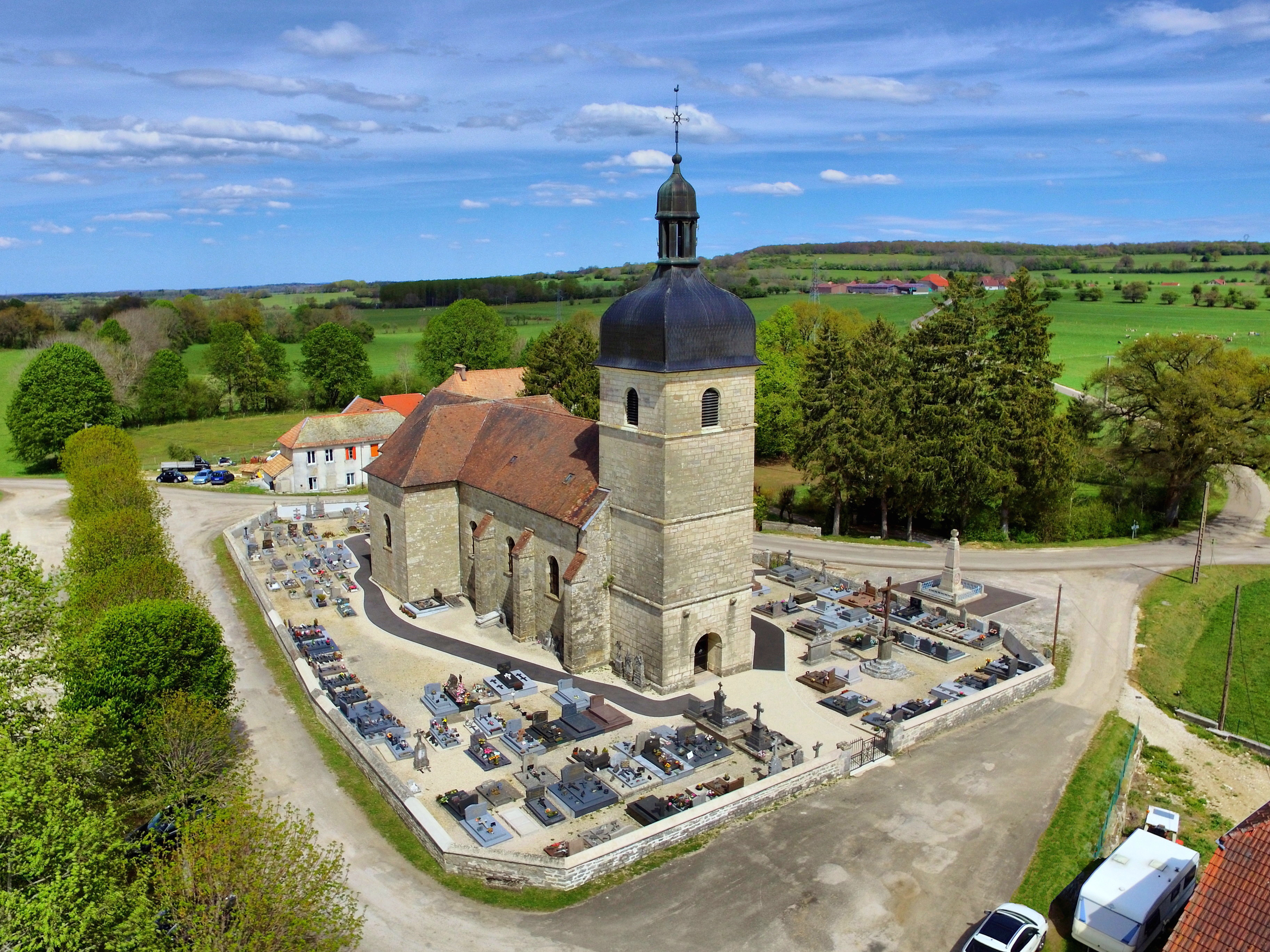
- The church in La Barêche
- Location of Voires
- Location within France Location within Bourgogne-Franche-Comté
- Coordinates: 47°05′54″N 6°14′54″E
- Country: France
- Region: Bourgogne-Franche-Comté
- Department: Doubs
- Arrondissement: Besançon
- Canton: Valdahon
- Intercommunality: Portes du Haut-Doubs

Government
  - Mayor (2020–2026): Lionel Pernin
- Area^{1}: 4.88 km^{2} (1.88 sq mi)
- Highest elevation: 709 m (2,326 ft)
- Lowest elevation: 604 m (1,982 ft)
- Population (2023): 77
  - Density: 16/km^{2} (41/sq mi)
- Time zone: UTC+01:00 (CET)
  - Summer (DST): UTC+02:00 (CEST)
- INSEE/Postal code: 25630 /25580
- ^{1} French Land Register data, which excludes lakes, ponds, glaciers > 1 km^{2} (0.386 sq mi or 247 acres) and river estuaries.

Voires (French pronunciation: [vwaʁ]) is a commune in the Doubs department' in the Bourgogne-Franche-Comté region in eastern France.

== Population ==
Historical population
Year	Pop.	±% p.a.
1968	72	—
1975	64	−1.67%
1982	49	−3.74%
1990	56	+1.68%
1999	57	+0.20%
2007	56	−0.22%
2012	69	+4.26%
2017	92	+5.92%
2023	77	−2.92%
Source: INSEE

== See also ==
- Communes of the Doubs department
