= Vauclusotte =

- Commune
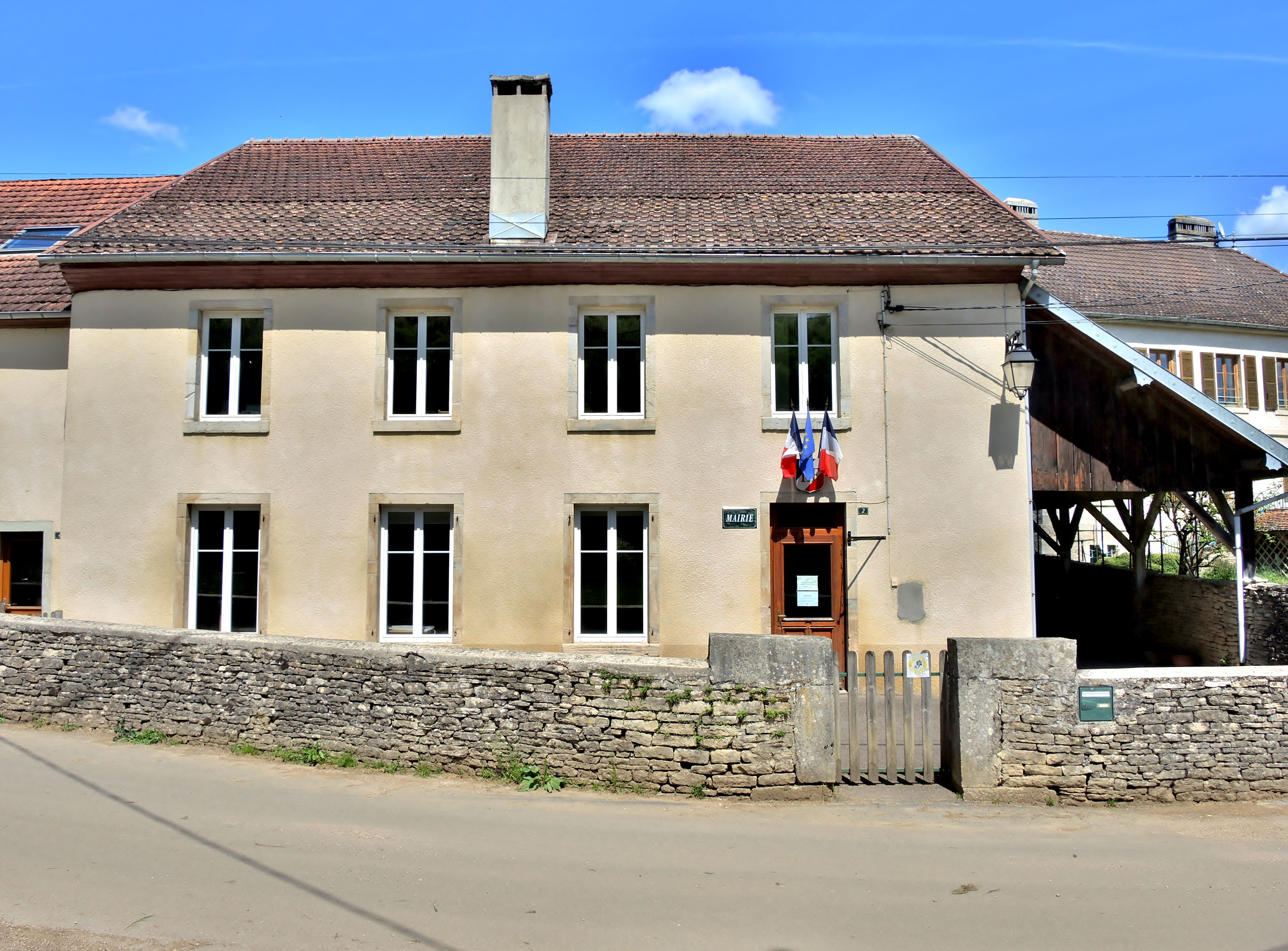
- The town hall in Vauclusotte
- Location of Vauclusotte
- Location within France Location within Bourgogne-Franche-Comté
- Coordinates: 47°16′48″N 6°44′07″E
- Country: France
- Region: Bourgogne-Franche-Comté
- Department: Doubs
- Arrondissement: Montbéliard
- Canton: Valdahon

Government
  - Mayor (2020–2026): Michel Bernardot
- Area^{1}: 7.62 km^{2} (2.94 sq mi)
- Highest elevation: 700 m (2,300 ft)
- Lowest elevation: 395 m (1,296 ft)
- Population (2023): 74
  - Density: 9.7/km^{2} (25/sq mi)
- Time zone: UTC+01:00 (CET)
  - Summer (DST): UTC+02:00 (CEST)
- INSEE/Postal code: 25589 /25380
- ^{1} French Land Register data, which excludes lakes, ponds, glaciers > 1 km^{2} (0.386 sq mi or 247 acres) and river estuaries.

Vauclusotte (French pronunciation: [voklyzɔt]) is a commune in the Doubs département in the Bourgogne-Franche-Comté region in eastern France.

== Geography ==
Vauclusotte lies 11 km (6.8 mi) northwest of Maîche near the valley of the Dessoubre.

== Population ==
Historical population
Year	Pop.	±% p.a.
1968	147	—
1975	136	−1.10%
1982	139	+0.31%
1990	123	−1.52%
1999	110	−1.23%
2007	100	−1.18%
2012	98	−0.40%
2017	87	−2.35%
2023	74	−2.66%
Source: INSEE

== See also ==
- Communes of the Doubs department
