= Longevelle-lès-Russey =

- Commune
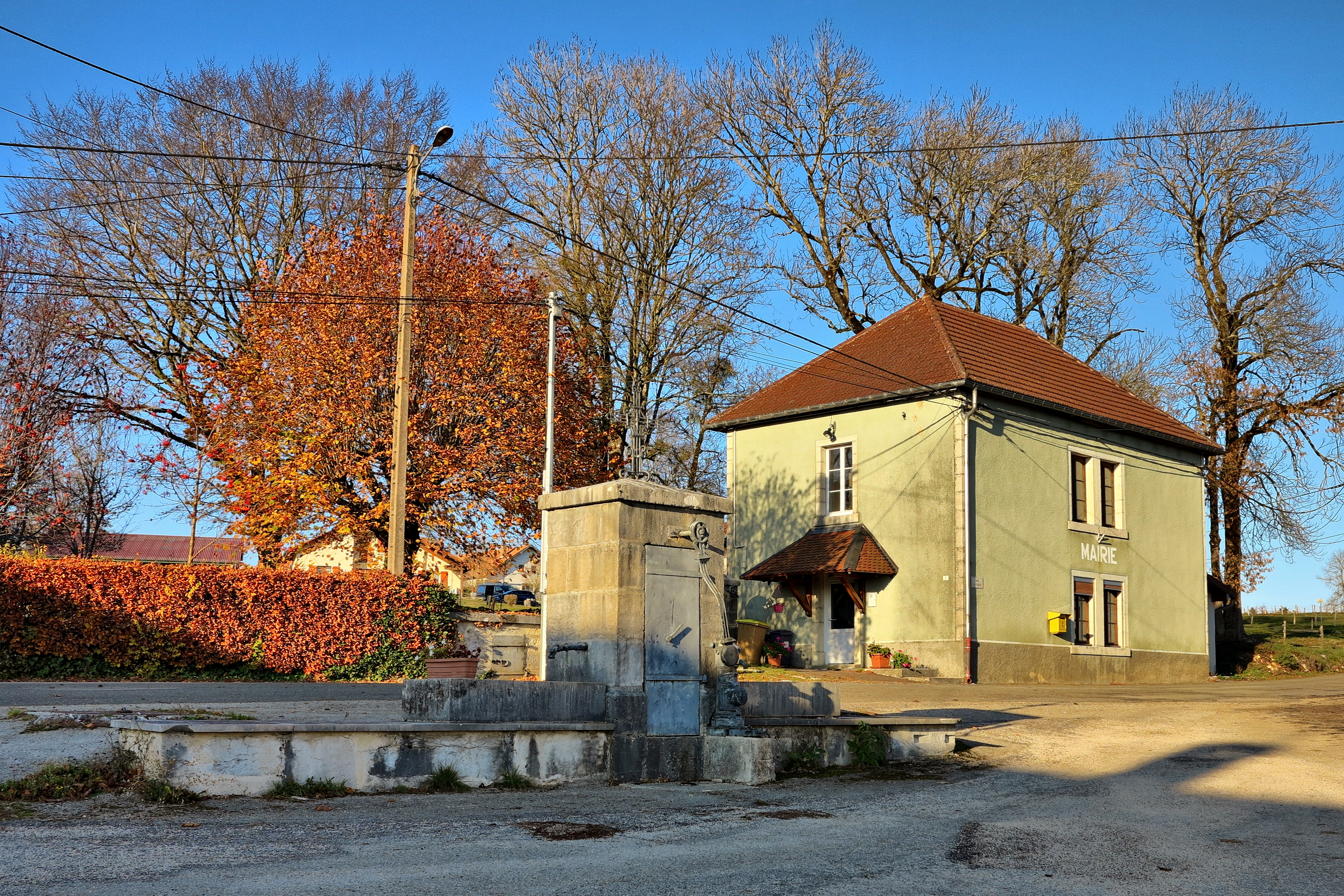
- The fountain and town hall in Longevelle-lès-Russey
- Location of Longevelle-lès-Russey
- Location within France Location within Bourgogne-Franche-Comté
- Coordinates: 47°13′35″N 6°39′07″E
- Country: France
- Region: Bourgogne-Franche-Comté
- Department: Doubs
- Arrondissement: Pontarlier
- Canton: Valdahon

Government
  - Mayor (2020–2026): Ingrid Willemin Jeannin
- Area^{1}: 2.56 km^{2} (0.99 sq mi)
- Highest elevation: 742 m (2,434 ft)
- Lowest elevation: 510 m (1,670 ft)
- Population (2023): 37
  - Density: 14/km^{2} (37/sq mi)
- Time zone: UTC+01:00 (CET)
  - Summer (DST): UTC+02:00 (CEST)
- INSEE/Postal code: 25344 /25380
- ^{1} French Land Register data, which excludes lakes, ponds, glaciers > 1 km^{2} (0.386 sq mi or 247 acres) and river estuaries.

Longevelle-lès-Russey (French pronunciation: [lɔ̃ʒvɛl lɛ ʁysɛ], literally Longevelle near Russey) is a commune in the Doubs department in the Bourgogne-Franche-Comté region in eastern France.

== Geography ==
The commune lies 16 km (9.9 mi) from Pierrefontaine on the edge of a forest with views of the Dessoubre gorge.

== Population ==
Historical population
Year	Pop.	±% p.a.
1968	44	—
1975	45	+0.32%
1982	44	−0.32%
1990	45	+0.28%
1999	46	+0.24%
2007	50	+1.05%
2012	43	−2.97%
2017	46	+1.36%
2023	37	−3.56%
Source: INSEE

== See also ==
- Communes of the Doubs department
