= Vernierfontaine =

- Commune
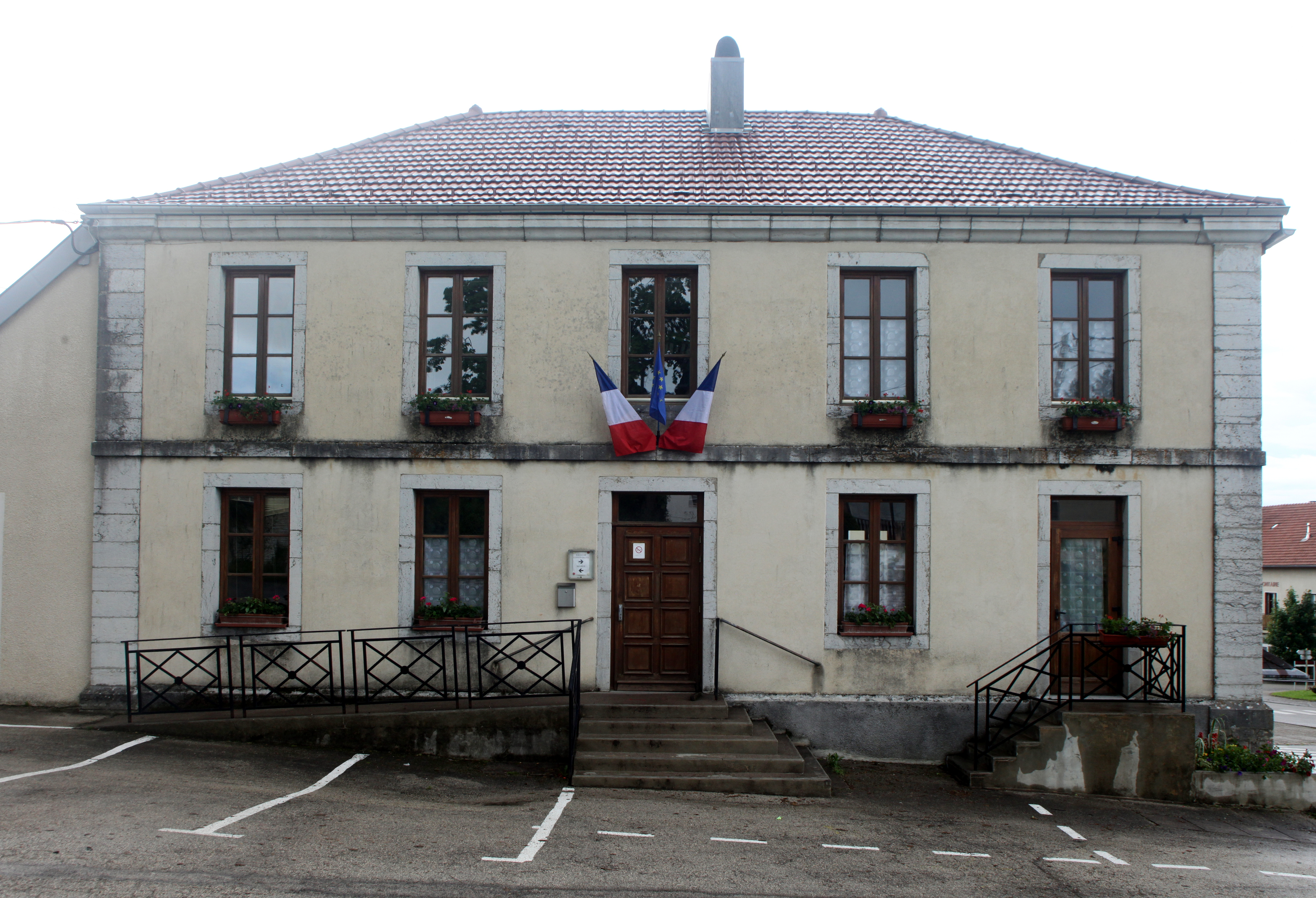
- The town hall in Vernierfontaine

- Coat of arms
- Location of Vernierfontaine
- Location within France Location within Bourgogne-Franche-Comté
- Coordinates: 47°06′34″N 6°17′59″E
- Country: France
- Region: Bourgogne-Franche-Comté
- Department: Doubs
- Arrondissement: Pontarlier
- Canton: Valdahon

Government
  - Mayor (2020–2026): Jean-Louis Truche
- Area^{1}: 13.28 km^{2} (5.13 sq mi)
- Highest elevation: 769 m (2,523 ft)
- Lowest elevation: 603 m (1,978 ft)
- Population (2023): 486
  - Density: 36.6/km^{2} (94.8/sq mi)
- Time zone: UTC+01:00 (CET)
  - Summer (DST): UTC+02:00 (CEST)
- INSEE/Postal code: 25605 /25580
- ^{1} French Land Register data, which excludes lakes, ponds, glaciers > 1 km^{2} (0.386 sq mi or 247 acres) and river estuaries.

Vernierfontaine is a commune in the Doubs department in the Bourgogne-Franche-Comté region in eastern France.

== Population ==
Historical population
Year	Pop.	±% p.a.
1968	336	—
1975	334	−0.09%
1982	308	−1.15%
1990	321	+0.52%
1999	321	+0.00%
2007	408	+3.04%
2012	437	+1.38%
2017	462	+1.12%
2023	486	+0.85%
Source: INSEE

== See also ==
- Communes of the Doubs department
