= Avoudrey =

- Commune
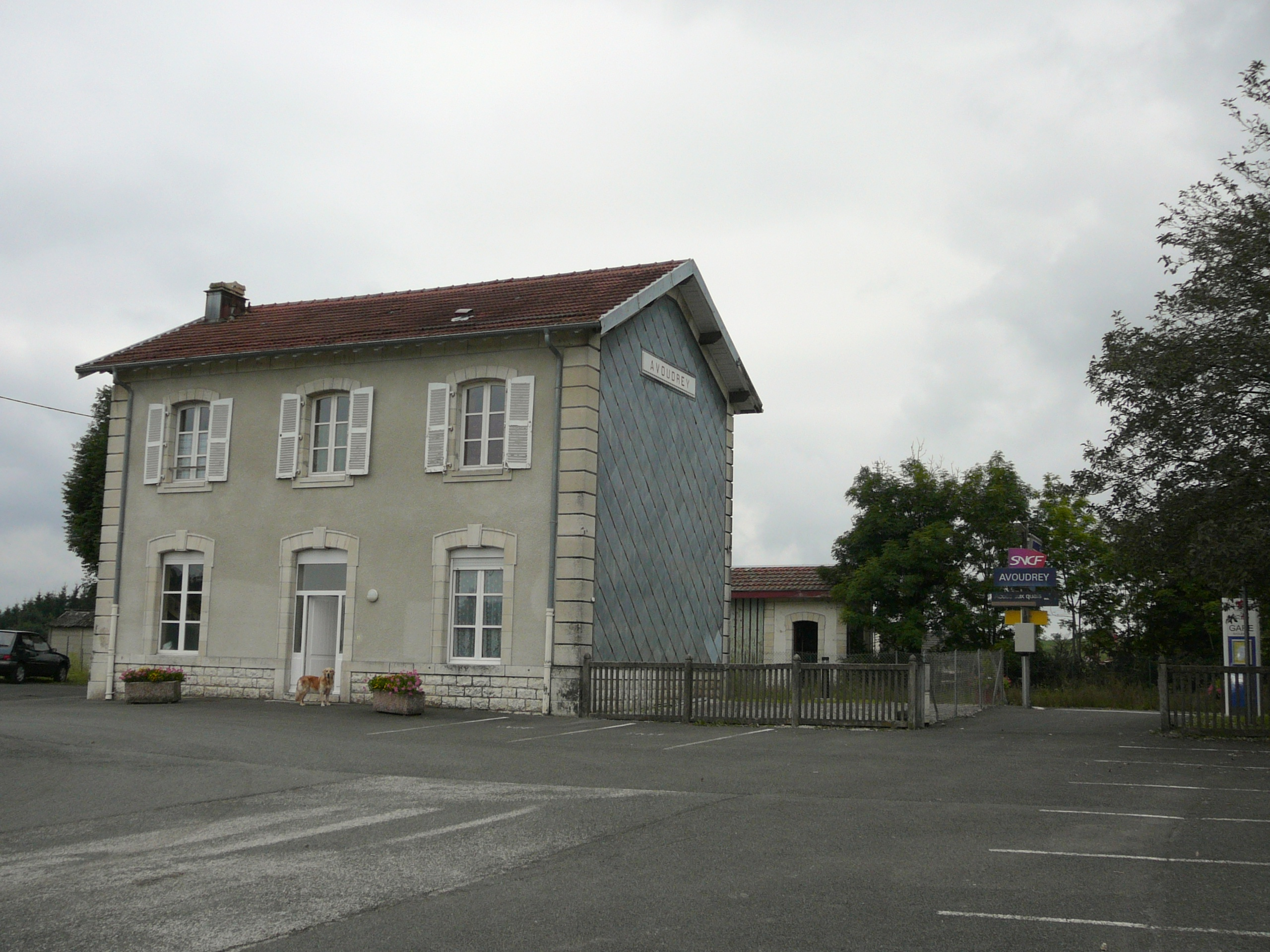
- The railway station in Avoudrey
- Location of Avoudrey
- Location within France Location within Bourgogne-Franche-Comté
- Coordinates: 47°08′14″N 6°26′10″E
- Country: France
- Region: Bourgogne-Franche-Comté
- Department: Doubs
- Arrondissement: Pontarlier
- Canton: Valdahon
- Intercommunality: CC Portes du Haut-Doubs

Government
  - Mayor (2020–2026): Gilbert Distel
- Area^{1}: 12.86 km^{2} (4.97 sq mi)
- Highest elevation: 805 m (2,641 ft)
- Lowest elevation: 692 m (2,270 ft)
- Population (2023): 982
  - Density: 76.4/km^{2} (198/sq mi)
- Time zone: UTC+01:00 (CET)
  - Summer (DST): UTC+02:00 (CEST)
- INSEE/Postal code: 25039 /25690
- ^{1} French Land Register data, which excludes lakes, ponds, glaciers > 1 km^{2} (0.386 sq mi or 247 acres) and river estuaries.

Avoudrey (French pronunciation: [avudʁɛ]) is a commune in the Doubs department in the Bourgogne-Franche-Comté region in eastern France.

== Population ==
Historical population
Year	Pop.	±% p.a.
1968	543	—
1975	658	+2.78%
1982	710	+1.09%
1990	710	+0.00%
1999	705	−0.08%
2007	760	+0.94%
2012	876	+2.88%
2017	909	+0.74%
2023	982	+1.30%
Source: INSEE

== See also ==
- Communes of the Doubs department
