= Péseux =

- Commune
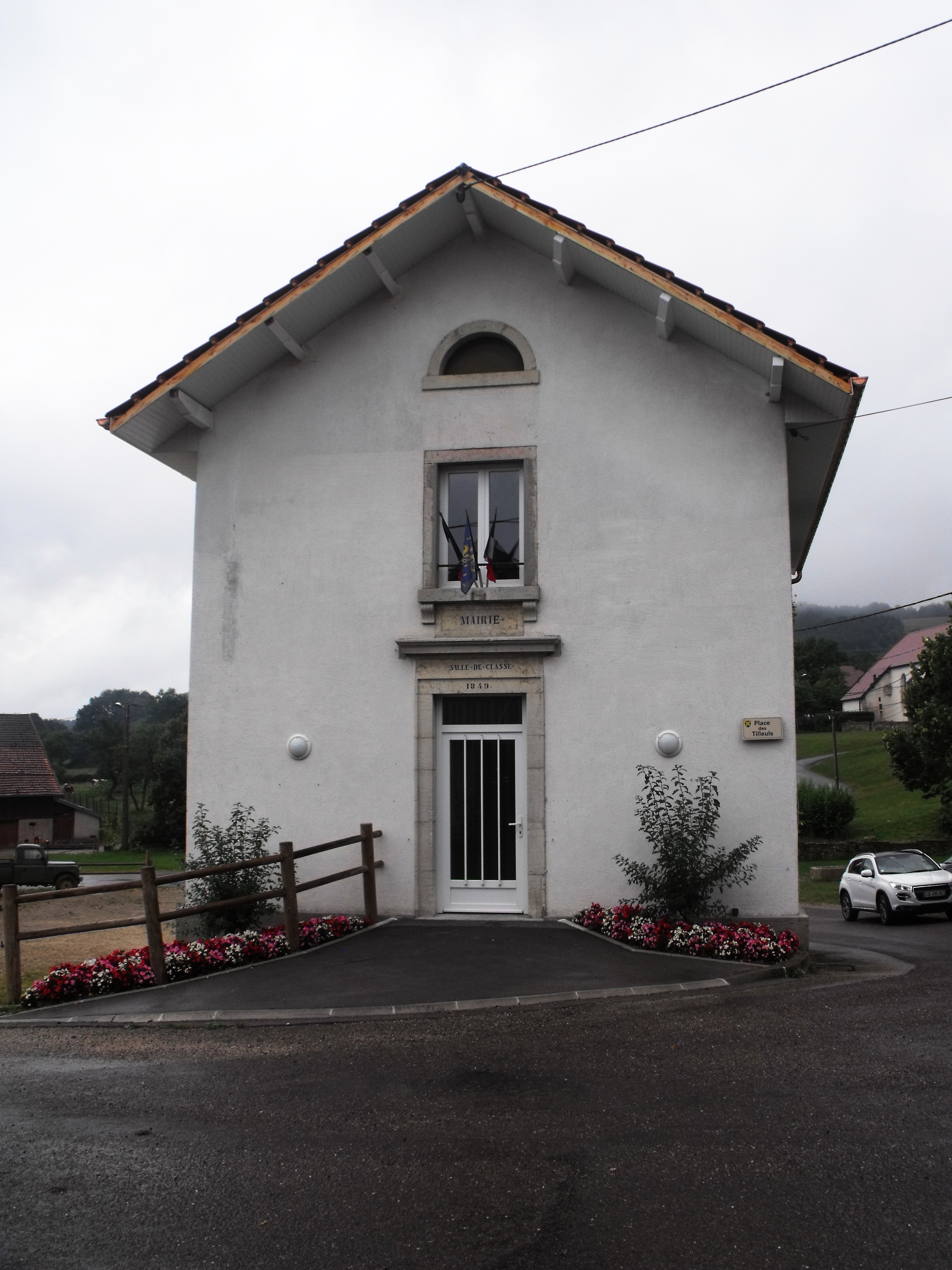
- The town hall in Péseux

- Coat of arms
- Location of Péseux
- Location within France Location within Bourgogne-Franche-Comté
- Coordinates: 47°19′02″N 6°40′50″E
- Country: France
- Region: Bourgogne-Franche-Comté
- Department: Doubs
- Arrondissement: Montbéliard
- Canton: Valdahon

Government
  - Mayor (2023–2026): Luc Binder
- Area^{1}: 6.63 km^{2} (2.56 sq mi)
- Highest elevation: 800 m (2,600 ft)
- Lowest elevation: 440 m (1,440 ft)
- Population (2023): 133
  - Density: 20.1/km^{2} (52.0/sq mi)
- Time zone: UTC+01:00 (CET)
  - Summer (DST): UTC+02:00 (CEST)
- INSEE/Postal code: 25449 /25190
- ^{1} French Land Register data, which excludes lakes, ponds, glaciers > 1 km^{2} (0.386 sq mi or 247 acres) and river estuaries.

Péseux (French pronunciation: [pezø]) is a commune in the Doubs department in the Bourgogne-Franche-Comté region in eastern France.

== Population ==
Historical population
Year	Pop.	±% p.a.
1968	93	—
1975	94	+0.15%
1982	91	−0.46%
1990	101	+1.31%
1999	95	−0.68%
2007	96	+0.13%
2012	103	+1.42%
2017	127	+4.28%
2023	133	+0.77%
Source: INSEE

== See also ==
- Communes of the Doubs department
