= Fournets-Luisans =

- Commune
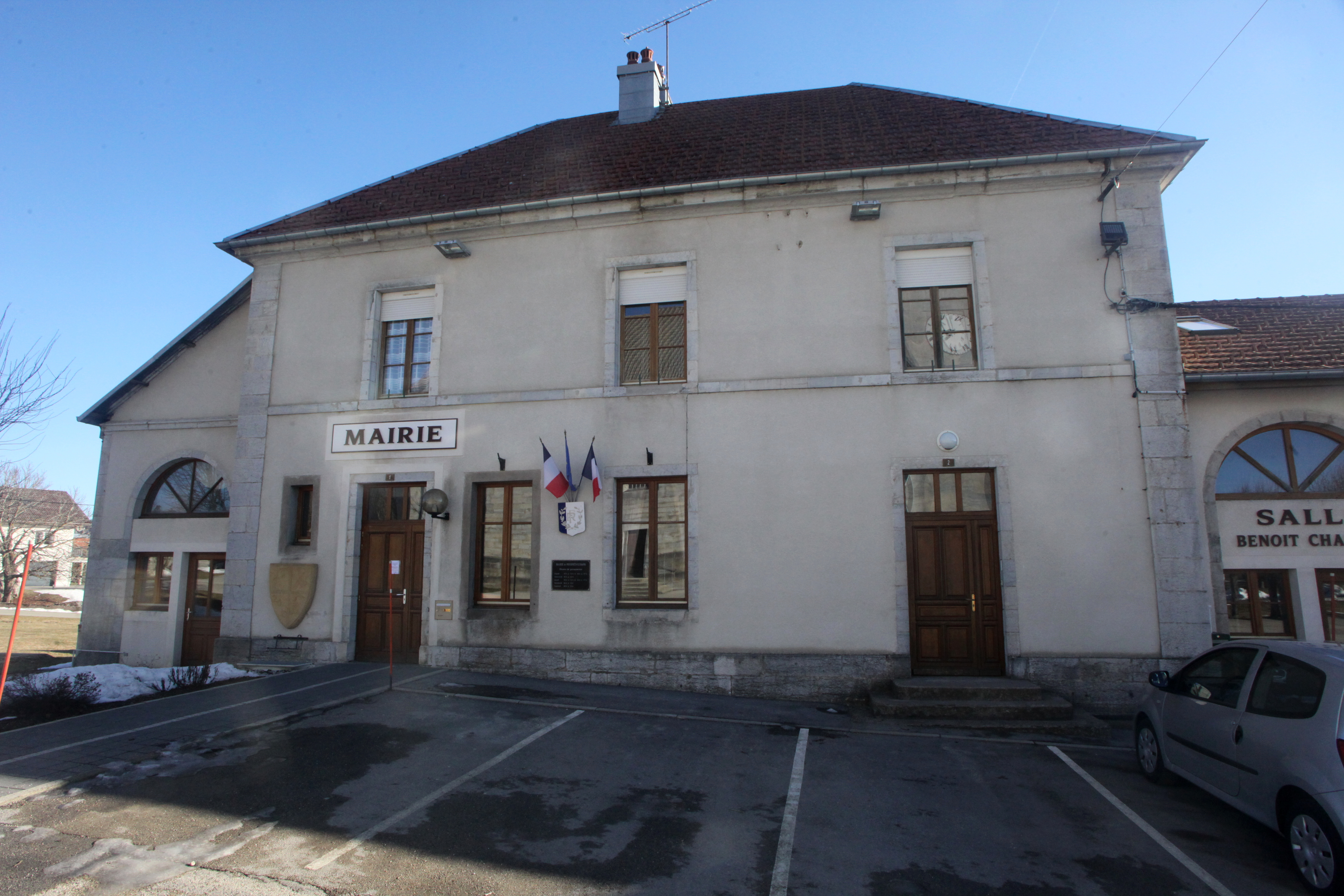
- The town hall in Fournets-Luisans
- Location of Fournets-Luisans
- Location within France Location within Bourgogne-Franche-Comté
- Coordinates: 47°06′45″N 6°33′47″E
- Country: France
- Region: Bourgogne-Franche-Comté
- Department: Doubs
- Arrondissement: Pontarlier
- Canton: Valdahon

Government
  - Mayor (2020–2026): Thierry Courtois
- Area^{1}: 27.71 km^{2} (10.70 sq mi)
- Highest elevation: 1,042 m (3,419 ft)
- Lowest elevation: 706 m (2,316 ft)
- Population (2023): 744
  - Density: 26.8/km^{2} (69.5/sq mi)
- Time zone: UTC+01:00 (CET)
  - Summer (DST): UTC+02:00 (CEST)
- INSEE/Postal code: 25288 /25390
- ^{1} French Land Register data, which excludes lakes, ponds, glaciers > 1 km^{2} (0.386 sq mi or 247 acres) and river estuaries.

Fournets-Luisans (French pronunciation: [fuʁnɛ lɥizɑ̃]) is a commune in the Doubs department in the Bourgogne-Franche-Comté region in eastern France. It was created in 1973 by the merger of two former communes: Grandfontaine-Fournets and Luisans.

== Population ==
Population data refer to the area corresponding with the commune as of January 2025.

Historical population
| Year | Pop. | ±% p.a. |
|---|---|---|
| 1968 | 391 | — |
| 1975 | 380 | −0.41% |
| 1982 | 432 | +1.85% |
| 1990 | 494 | +1.69% |
| 1999 | 501 | +0.16% |
| 2007 | 588 | +2.02% |
| 2012 | 640 | +1.71% |
| 2017 | 699 | +1.78% |
| 2023 | 744 | +1.05% |
Source: INSEE

== See also ==
- Communes of the Doubs department
