= Lac de Malpas =

Lake in France

- Location within France
- Location: Doubs department
- Coordinates: 46°50′2″N 6°17′39″E
- Basin countries: France

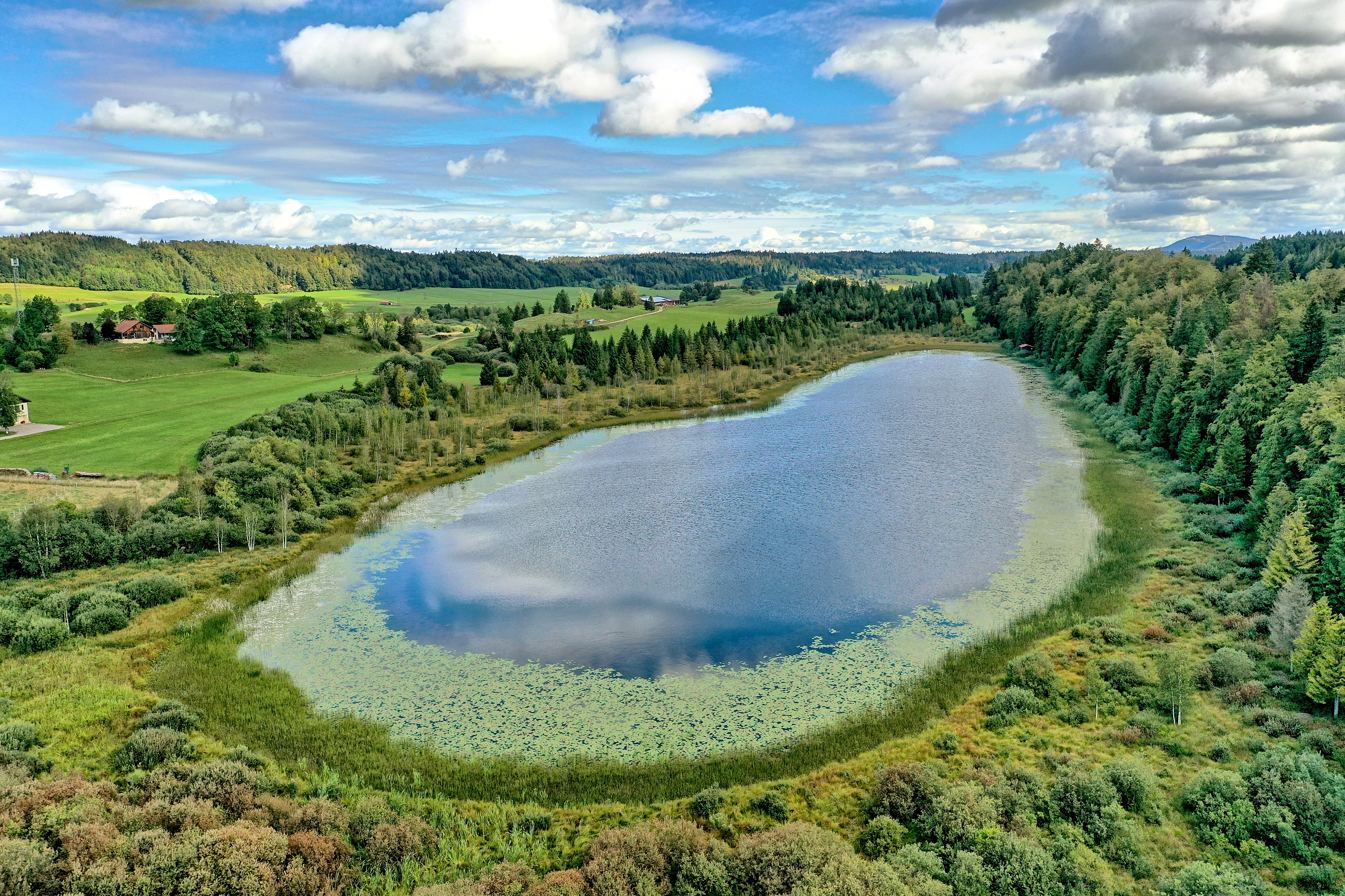

Lac de Malpas is a lake at Malpas in the Doubs department of France.
