= Dompierre-les-Tilleuls =

- Commune
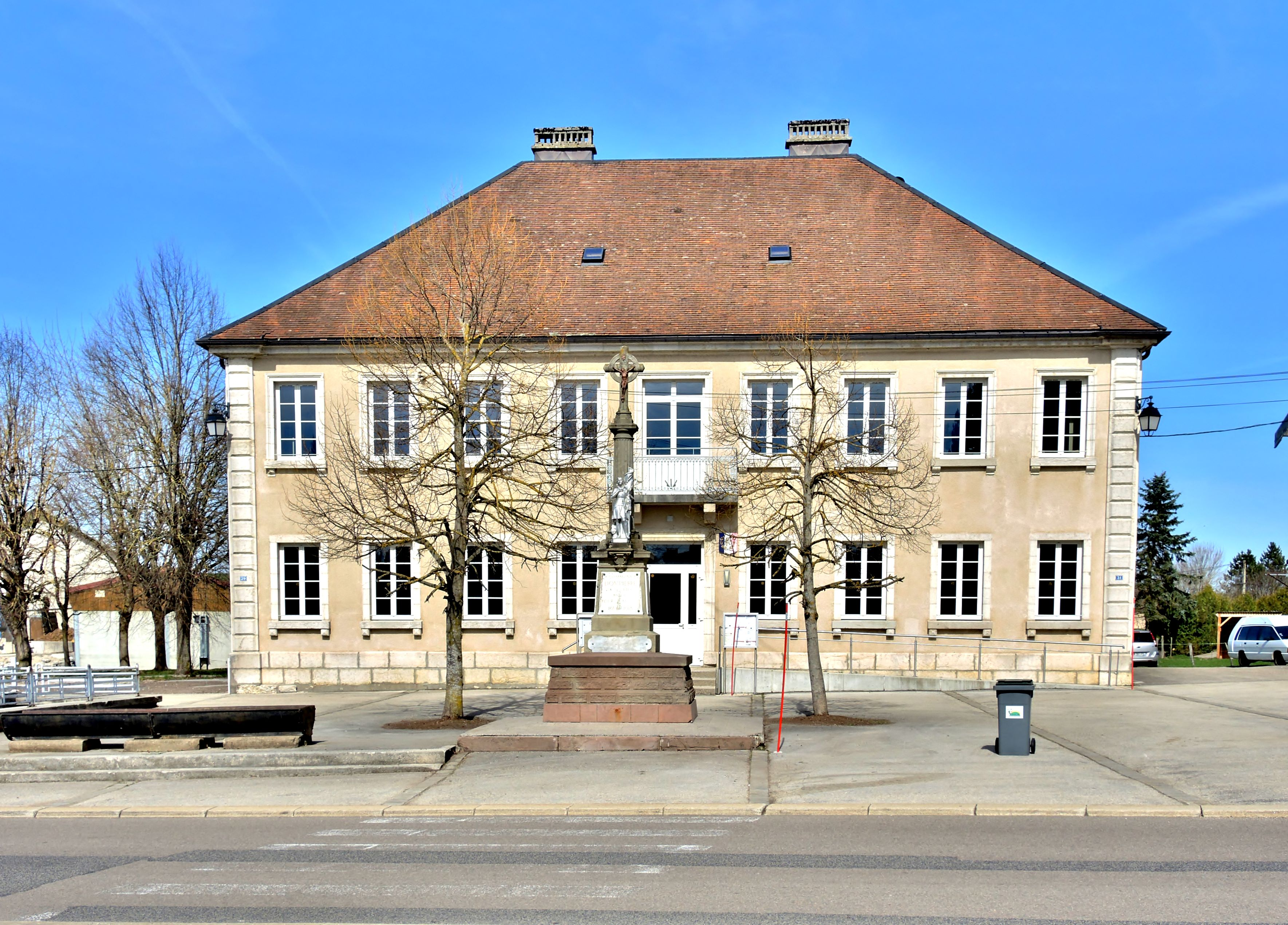
- The town hall in Dompierre-les-Tilleuls

- Coat of arms
- Location of Dompierre-les-Tilleuls
- Location within France Location within Bourgogne-Franche-Comté
- Coordinates: 46°52′21″N 6°11′06″E
- Country: France
- Region: Bourgogne-Franche-Comté
- Department: Doubs
- Arrondissement: Pontarlier
- Canton: Frasne
- Intercommunality: Plateau de Frasne et Val du Drugeon

Government
  - Mayor (2020–2026): Michel Beuque
- Area^{1}: 12.94 km^{2} (5.00 sq mi)
- Highest elevation: 887 m (2,910 ft)
- Lowest elevation: 804 m (2,638 ft)
- Population (2023): 291
  - Density: 22.5/km^{2} (58.2/sq mi)
- Time zone: UTC+01:00 (CET)
  - Summer (DST): UTC+02:00 (CEST)
- INSEE/Postal code: 25202 /25560
- ^{1} French Land Register data, which excludes lakes, ponds, glaciers > 1 km^{2} (0.386 sq mi or 247 acres) and river estuaries.

Dompierre-les-Tilleuls (French pronunciation: [dɔ̃pjɛʁ le tijœl]) is a commune in the Doubs department in the Bourgogne-Franche-Comté region in eastern France.

== Population ==
Historical population
Year	Pop.	±% p.a.
1968	214	—
1975	182	−2.29%
1982	180	−0.16%
1990	207	+1.76%
1999	210	+0.16%
2007	265	+2.95%
2012	251	−1.08%
2017	267	+1.24%
2023	291	+1.44%
Source: INSEE

== See also ==
- Communes of the Doubs department
