= Villeneuve-d'Amont =

- Commune
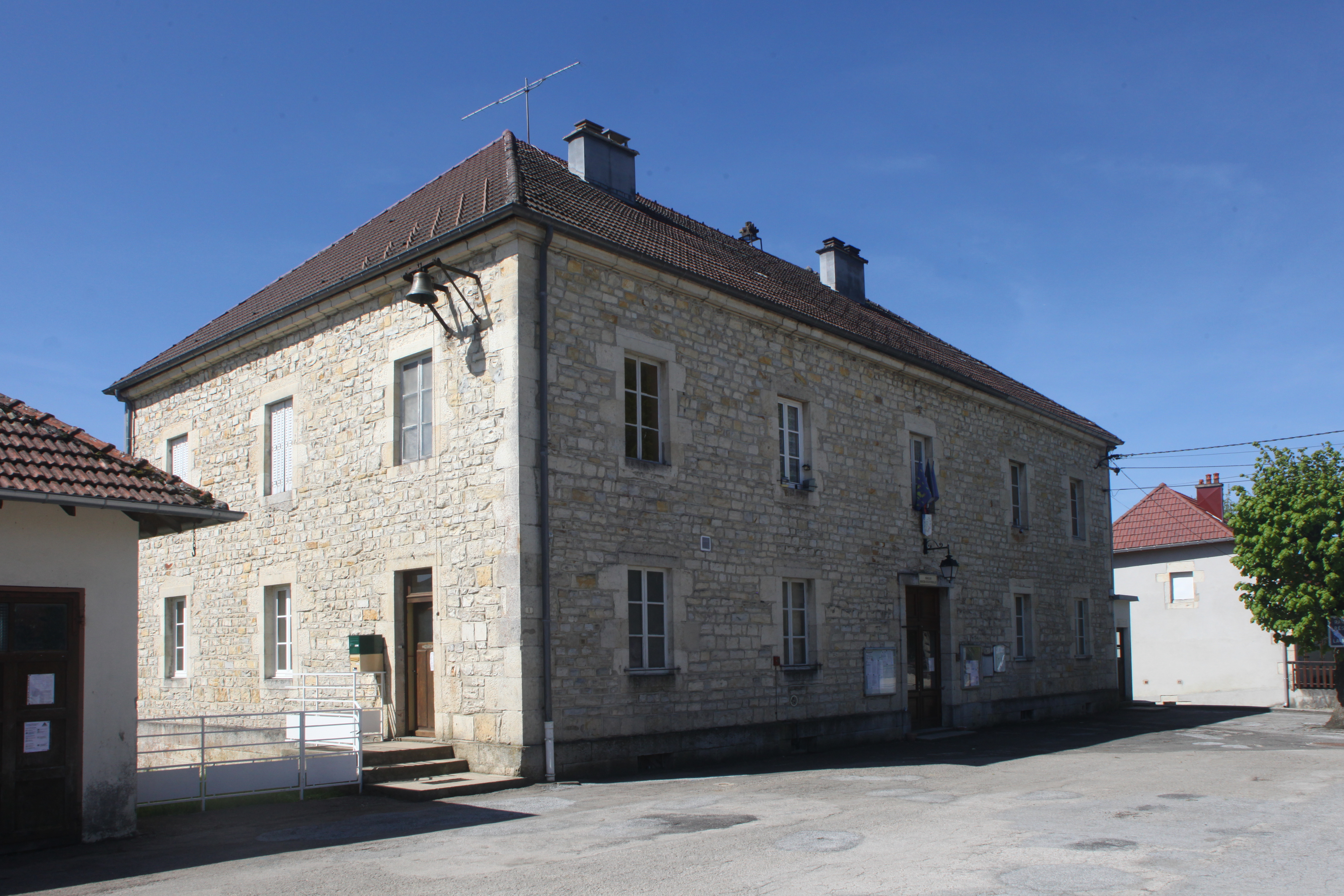
- The town hall in Villeneuve-d'Amont
- Location of Villeneuve-d'Amont
- Location within France Location within Bourgogne-Franche-Comté
- Coordinates: 46°56′26″N 6°01′57″E
- Country: France
- Region: Bourgogne-Franche-Comté
- Department: Doubs
- Arrondissement: Pontarlier
- Canton: Frasne
- Intercommunality: Altitude 800

Government
  - Mayor (2020–2026): Marie-Claire Monnin
- Area^{1}: 14.27 km^{2} (5.51 sq mi)
- Highest elevation: 727 m (2,385 ft)
- Lowest elevation: 647 m (2,123 ft)
- Population (2023): 213
  - Density: 14.9/km^{2} (38.7/sq mi)
- Time zone: UTC+01:00 (CET)
  - Summer (DST): UTC+02:00 (CEST)
- INSEE/Postal code: 25621 /25270
- ^{1} French Land Register data, which excludes lakes, ponds, glaciers > 1 km^{2} (0.386 sq mi or 247 acres) and river estuaries.

Villeneuve-d'Amont (French pronunciation: [vilnœv damɔ̃]; Arpitan: Veloneuvo) is a commune in the Doubs department in the Bourgogne-Franche-Comté region in eastern France.

== Population ==
Historical population
Year	Pop.	±% p.a.
1968	268	—
1975	261	−0.38%
1982	214	−2.80%
1990	257	+2.32%
1999	260	+0.13%
2007	269	+0.43%
2012	267	−0.15%
2017	235	−2.52%
2023	213	−1.62%
Source: INSEE

== See also ==
- Communes of the Doubs department
