= Chapelle-d'Huin =

- Commune
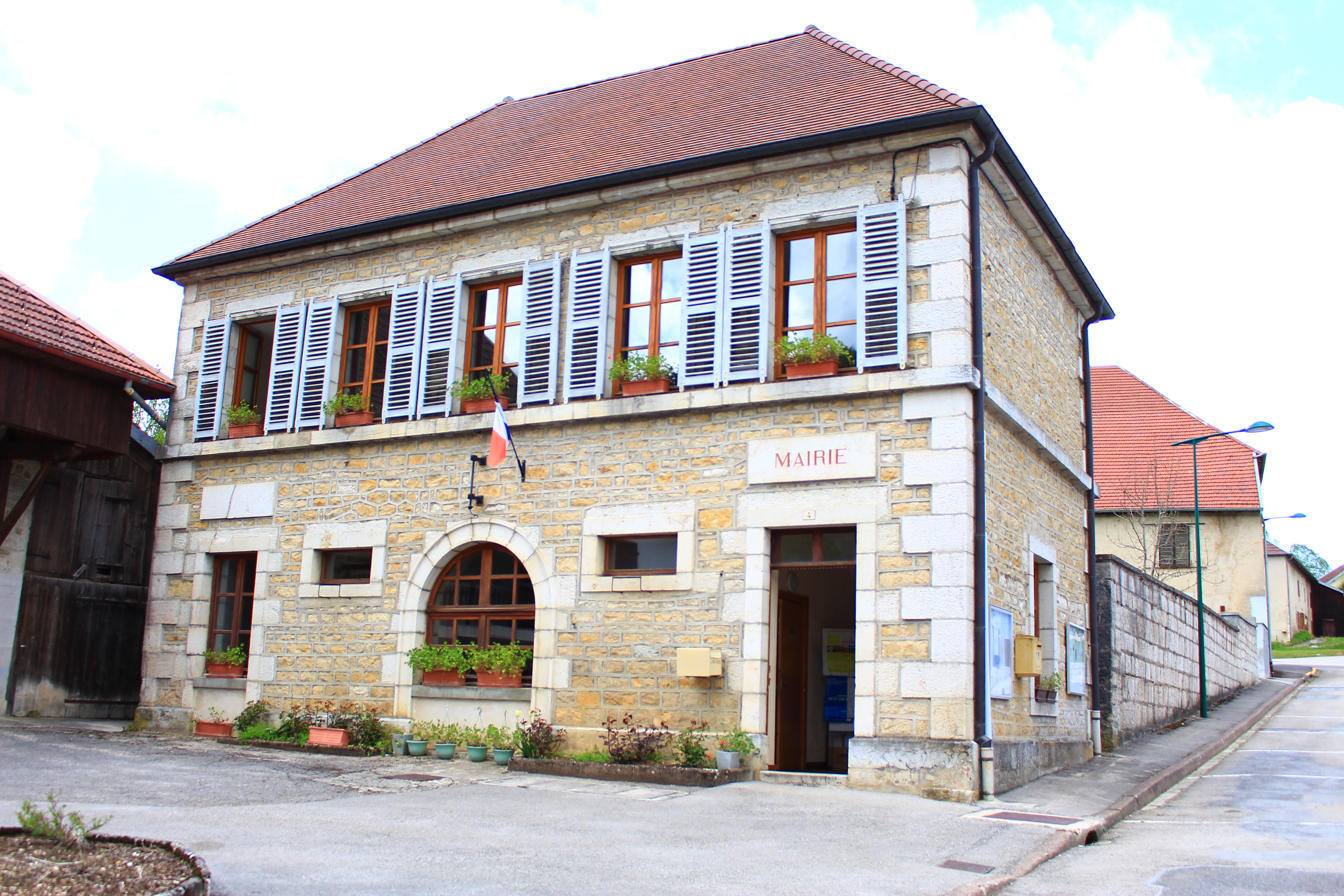
- The town hall in Chapelle-d'Huin
- Location of Chapelle-d'Huin
- Location within France Location within Bourgogne-Franche-Comté
- Coordinates: 46°56′00″N 6°10′03″E
- Country: France
- Region: Bourgogne-Franche-Comté
- Department: Doubs
- Arrondissement: Pontarlier
- Canton: Frasne
- Intercommunality: Altitude 800

Government
  - Mayor (2020–2026): Béatrice Pritzy
- Area^{1}: 23.71 km^{2} (9.15 sq mi)
- Highest elevation: 893 m (2,930 ft)
- Lowest elevation: 710 m (2,330 ft)
- Population (2023): 549
  - Density: 23.2/km^{2} (60.0/sq mi)
- Time zone: UTC+01:00 (CET)
  - Summer (DST): UTC+02:00 (CEST)
- INSEE/Postal code: 25122 /25270
- ^{1} French Land Register data, which excludes lakes, ponds, glaciers > 1 km^{2} (0.386 sq mi or 247 acres) and river estuaries.

Chapelle-d'Huin (French pronunciation: [ʃapɛl dɥɛ̃]) is a commune in the Doubs department in the Bourgogne-Franche-Comté region in eastern France.

== Population ==
Historical population
| Year | Pop. | ±% p.a. |
|---|---|---|
| 1968 | 320 | — |
| 1975 | 252 | −3.36% |
| 1982 | 278 | +1.41% |
| 1990 | 297 | +0.83% |
| 1999 | 351 | +1.87% |
| 2007 | 379 | +0.96% |
| 2012 | 488 | +5.19% |
| 2017 | 514 | +1.04% |
| 2023 | 549 | +1.10% |
Source: INSEE

== See also ==
- Communes of the Doubs department
