= Bonnevaux, Doubs =

Bonnevaux
- Commune
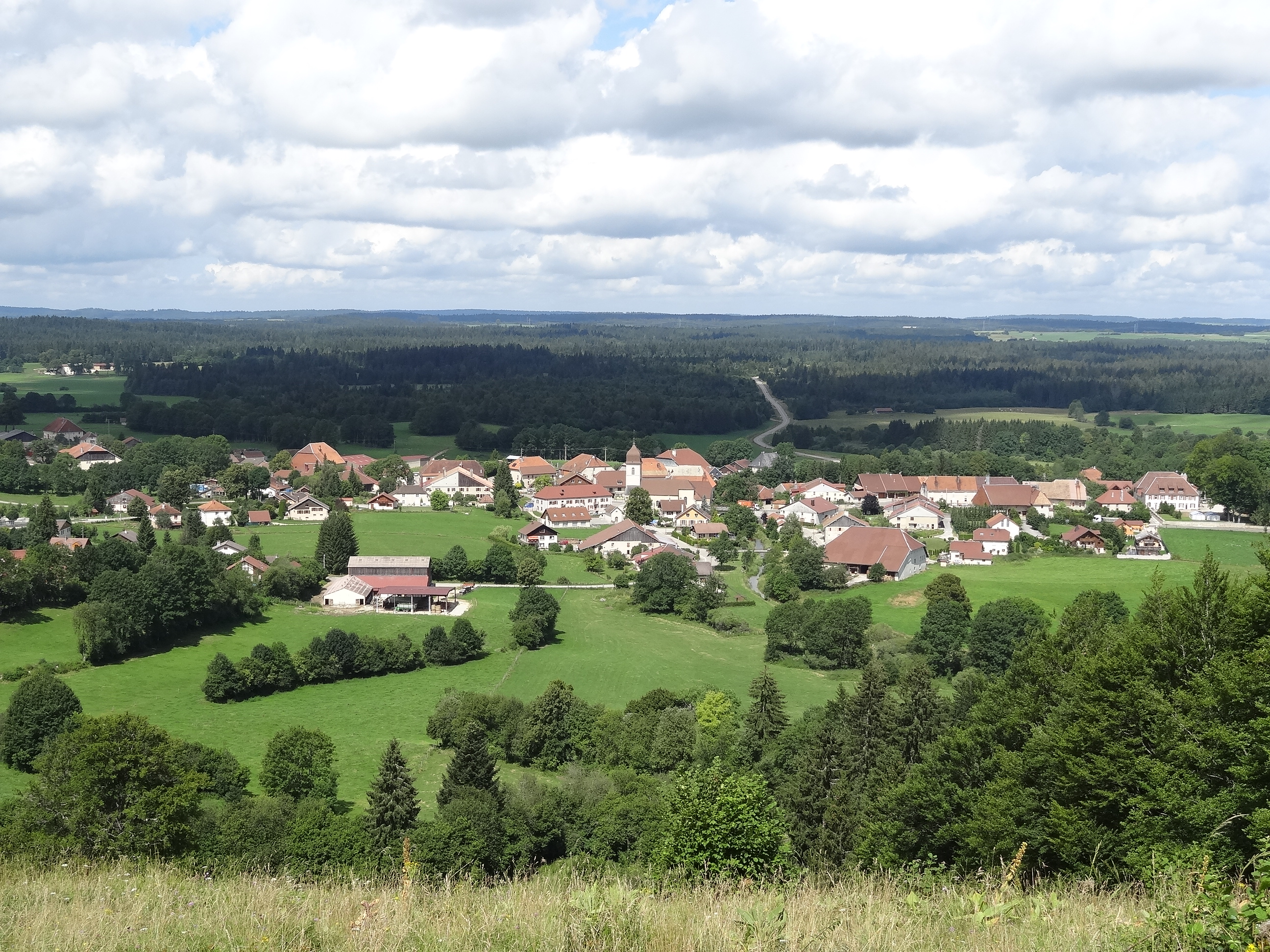
- A general view of Bonnevaux
- Location of Bonnevaux
- Location within France Location within Bourgogne-Franche-Comté
- Coordinates: 46°49′N 6°11′E
- Country: France
- Region: Bourgogne-Franche-Comté
- Department: Doubs
- Arrondissement: Pontarlier
- Canton: Frasne
- Intercommunality: Plateau de Frasne et Val du Drugeon

Government
  - Mayor (2020–2026): Monique Brulport
- Area^{1}: 16.53 km^{2} (6.38 sq mi)
- Highest elevation: 1,097 m (3,599 ft)
- Lowest elevation: 826 m (2,710 ft)
- Population (2023): 410
  - Density: 25/km^{2} (64/sq mi)
- Time zone: UTC+01:00 (CET)
  - Summer (DST): UTC+02:00 (CEST)
- INSEE/Postal code: 25075 /25560
- ^{1} French Land Register data, which excludes lakes, ponds, glaciers > 1 km^{2} (0.386 sq mi or 247 acres) and river estuaries.

Bonnevaux (French pronunciation: [bɔnvo]; Arpitan: Bounnëva) is a commune in the Doubs department in the Bourgogne-Franche-Comté region in eastern France.

== Population ==
Historical population
Year	Pop.	±% p.a.
1968	246	—
1975	218	−1.71%
1982	230	+0.77%
1990	224	−0.33%
1999	260	+1.67%
2007	303	+1.93%
2012	351	+2.98%
2017	385	+1.87%
2023	410	+1.05%
Source: INSEE

== See also ==
- Communes of the Doubs department
