= Fourcatier-et-Maison-Neuve =

- Commune
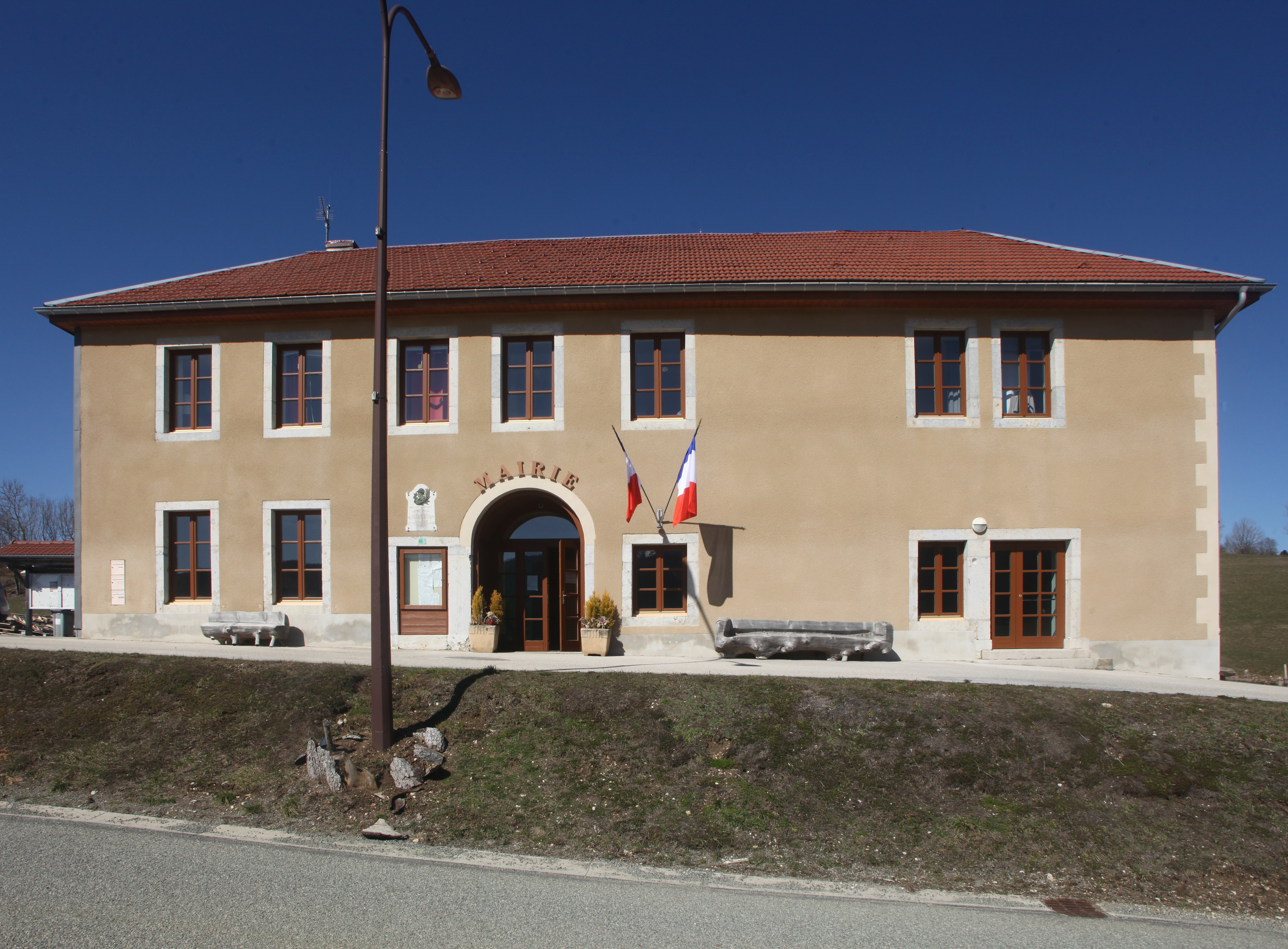
- The town hall in Fourcatier-et-Maison-Neuve
- Location of Fourcatier-et-Maison-Neuve
- Location within France Location within Bourgogne-Franche-Comté
- Coordinates: 46°45′47″N 6°19′07″E
- Country: France
- Region: Bourgogne-Franche-Comté
- Department: Doubs
- Arrondissement: Pontarlier
- Canton: Frasne

Government
  - Mayor (2020–2026): Camille Rousselet
- Area^{1}: 2.75 km^{2} (1.06 sq mi)
- Highest elevation: 1,025 m (3,363 ft)
- Lowest elevation: 889 m (2,917 ft)
- Population (2023): 130
  - Density: 47/km^{2} (120/sq mi)
- Time zone: UTC+01:00 (CET)
  - Summer (DST): UTC+02:00 (CEST)
- INSEE/Postal code: 25252 /25370
- ^{1} French Land Register data, which excludes lakes, ponds, glaciers > 1 km^{2} (0.386 sq mi or 247 acres) and river estuaries.

Fourcatier-et-Maison-Neuve (French pronunciation: [fuʁkatje e mɛzɔ̃ nœv]) is a commune in the Doubs department in the Bourgogne-Franche-Comté region in eastern France.

== Population ==
Historical population
Year	Pop.	±% p.a.
1968	50	—
1975	34	−5.36%
1982	49	+5.36%
1990	80	+6.32%
1999	75	−0.71%
2007	76	+0.17%
2012	90	+3.44%
2017	112	+4.47%
2023	130	+2.52%
Source: INSEE

== See also ==
- Communes of the Doubs department
