= Gellin =

- Commune
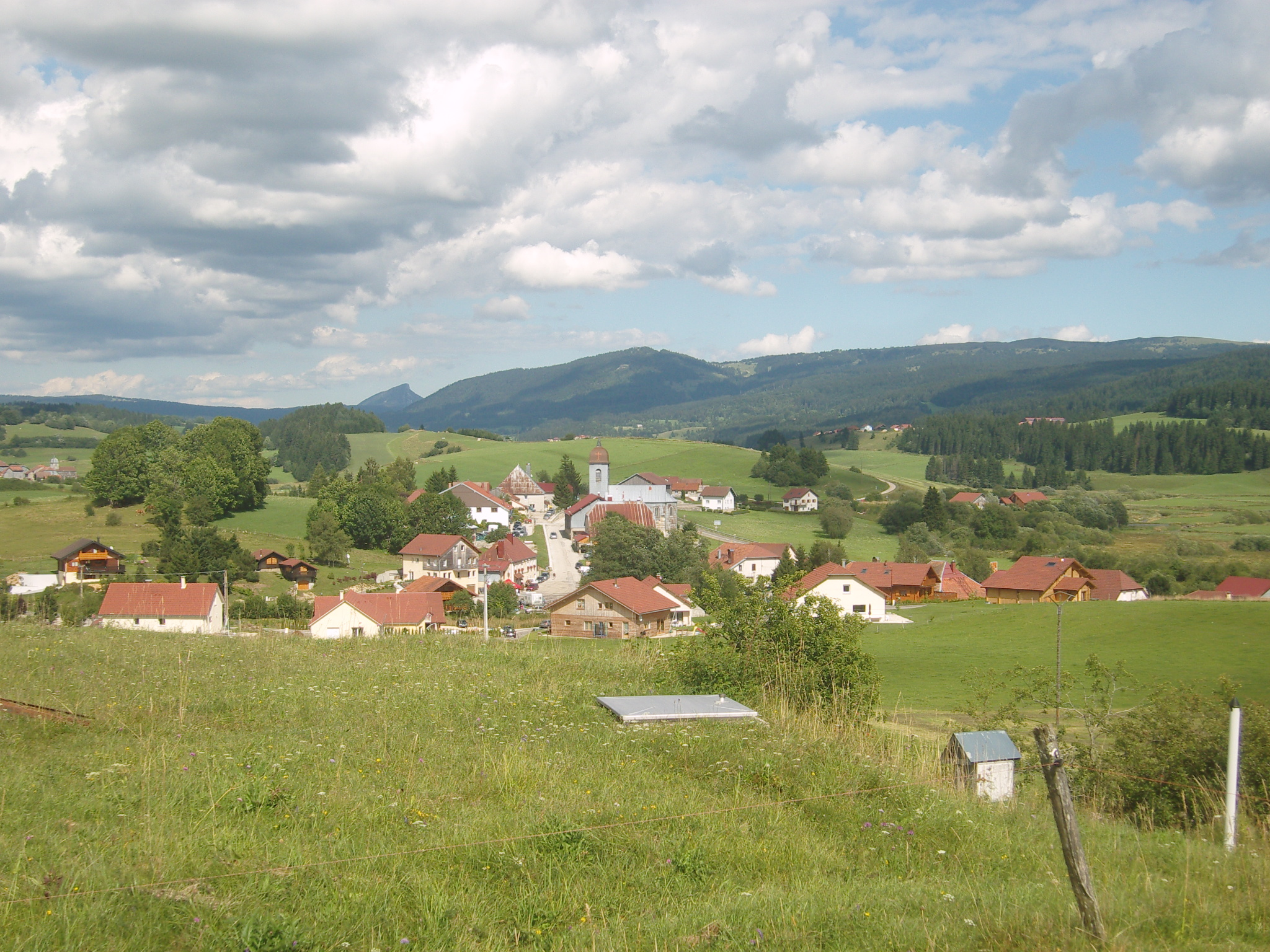
- A general view of Gellin
- Location of Gellin
- Location within France Location within Bourgogne-Franche-Comté
- Coordinates: 46°43′58″N 6°14′19″E
- Country: France
- Region: Bourgogne-Franche-Comté
- Department: Doubs
- Arrondissement: Pontarlier
- Canton: Frasne
- Intercommunality: Lacs et Montagnes du Haut-Doubs

Government
  - Mayor (2021–2026): Emilie Cessin
- Area^{1}: 4.87 km^{2} (1.88 sq mi)
- Highest elevation: 1,293 m (4,242 ft)
- Lowest elevation: 915 m (3,002 ft)
- Population (2023): 267
  - Density: 54.8/km^{2} (142/sq mi)
- Time zone: UTC+01:00 (CET)
  - Summer (DST): UTC+02:00 (CEST)
- INSEE/Postal code: 25263 /25240
- ^{1} French Land Register data, which excludes lakes, ponds, glaciers > 1 km^{2} (0.386 sq mi or 247 acres) and river estuaries.

Gellin (French pronunciation: [ʒɛlɛ̃]) is a commune in the Doubs department in the Bourgogne-Franche-Comté region in eastern France.

== Population ==
Historical population
Year	Pop.	±% p.a.
1968	113	—
1975	79	−4.98%
1982	74	−0.93%
1990	93	+2.90%
1999	155	+5.84%
2007	169	+1.09%
2012	223	+5.70%
2017	242	+1.65%
2023	267	+1.65%
Source: INSEE

== See also ==
- Communes of the Doubs department
