= Vaux-et-Chantegrue =

- Commune
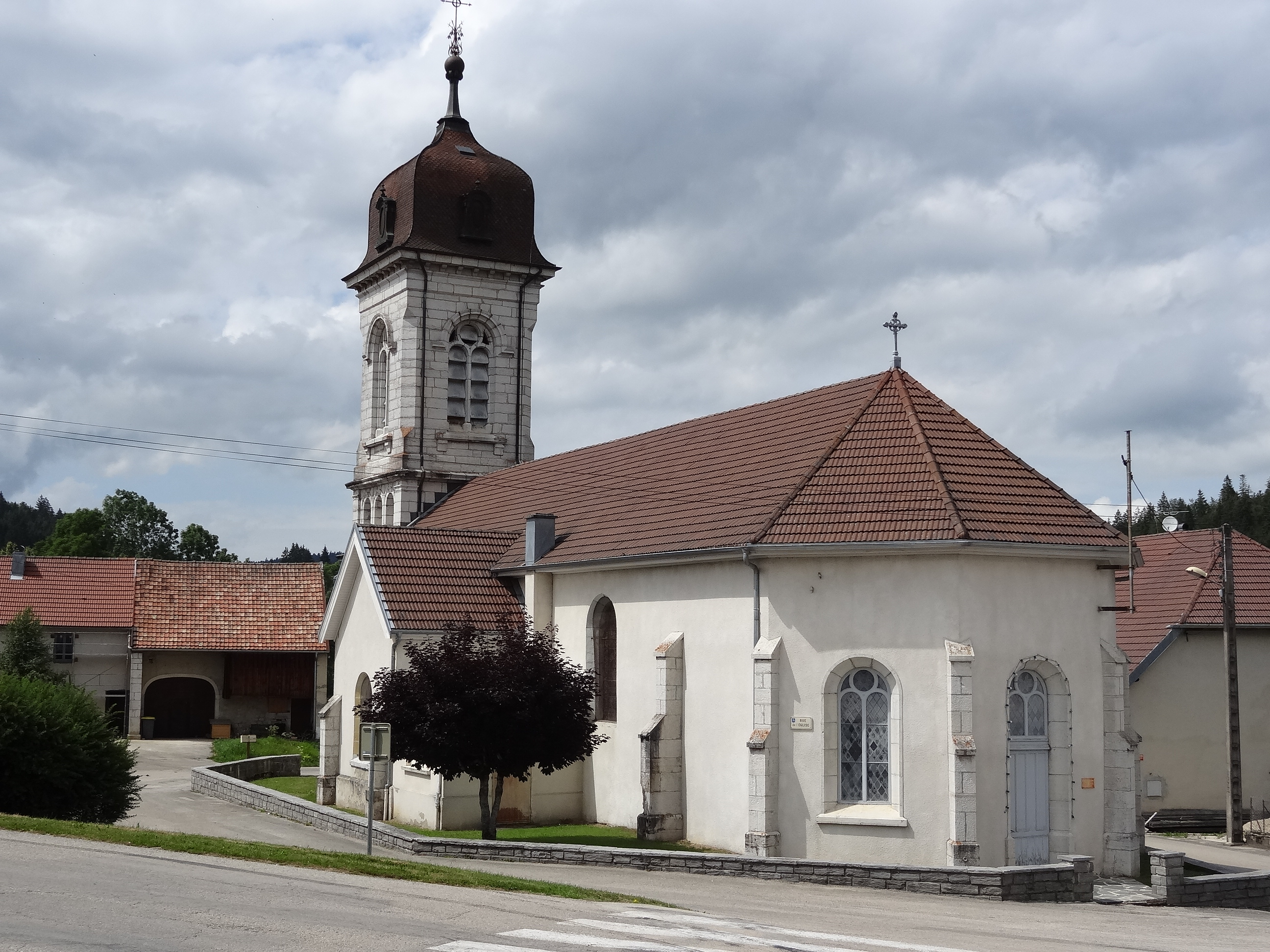
- The church in Vaux-et-Chantegrue

- Coat of arms
- Location of Vaux-et-Chantegrue
- Location within France Location within Bourgogne-Franche-Comté
- Coordinates: 46°48′42″N 6°15′01″E
- Country: France
- Region: Bourgogne-Franche-Comté
- Department: Doubs
- Arrondissement: Pontarlier
- Canton: Frasne
- Intercommunality: Plateau de Frasne et Val du Drugeon

Government
  - Mayor (2020–2026): Bernard Beschet
- Area^{1}: 13.98 km^{2} (5.40 sq mi)
- Highest elevation: 1,074 m (3,524 ft)
- Lowest elevation: 858 m (2,815 ft)
- Population (2023): 689
  - Density: 49.3/km^{2} (128/sq mi)
- Time zone: UTC+01:00 (CET)
  - Summer (DST): UTC+02:00 (CEST)
- INSEE/Postal code: 25592 /25160
- ^{1} French Land Register data, which excludes lakes, ponds, glaciers > 1 km^{2} (0.386 sq mi or 247 acres) and river estuaries.

Vaux-et-Chantegrue (French pronunciation: [vo e ʃɑ̃tɡʁy]) is a commune in the Doubs department in the Bourgogne-Franche-Comté region in eastern France.

== Population ==
Historical population
| Year | Pop. | ±% p.a. |
|---|---|---|
| 1968 | 441 | — |
| 1975 | 394 | −1.60% |
| 1982 | 410 | +0.57% |
| 1990 | 490 | +2.25% |
| 1999 | 503 | +0.29% |
| 2007 | 557 | +1.28% |
| 2012 | 564 | +0.25% |
| 2017 | 585 | +0.73% |
| 2023 | 689 | +2.76% |
Source: INSEE

== See also ==
- Communes of the Doubs department
