= Boujailles =

- Commune
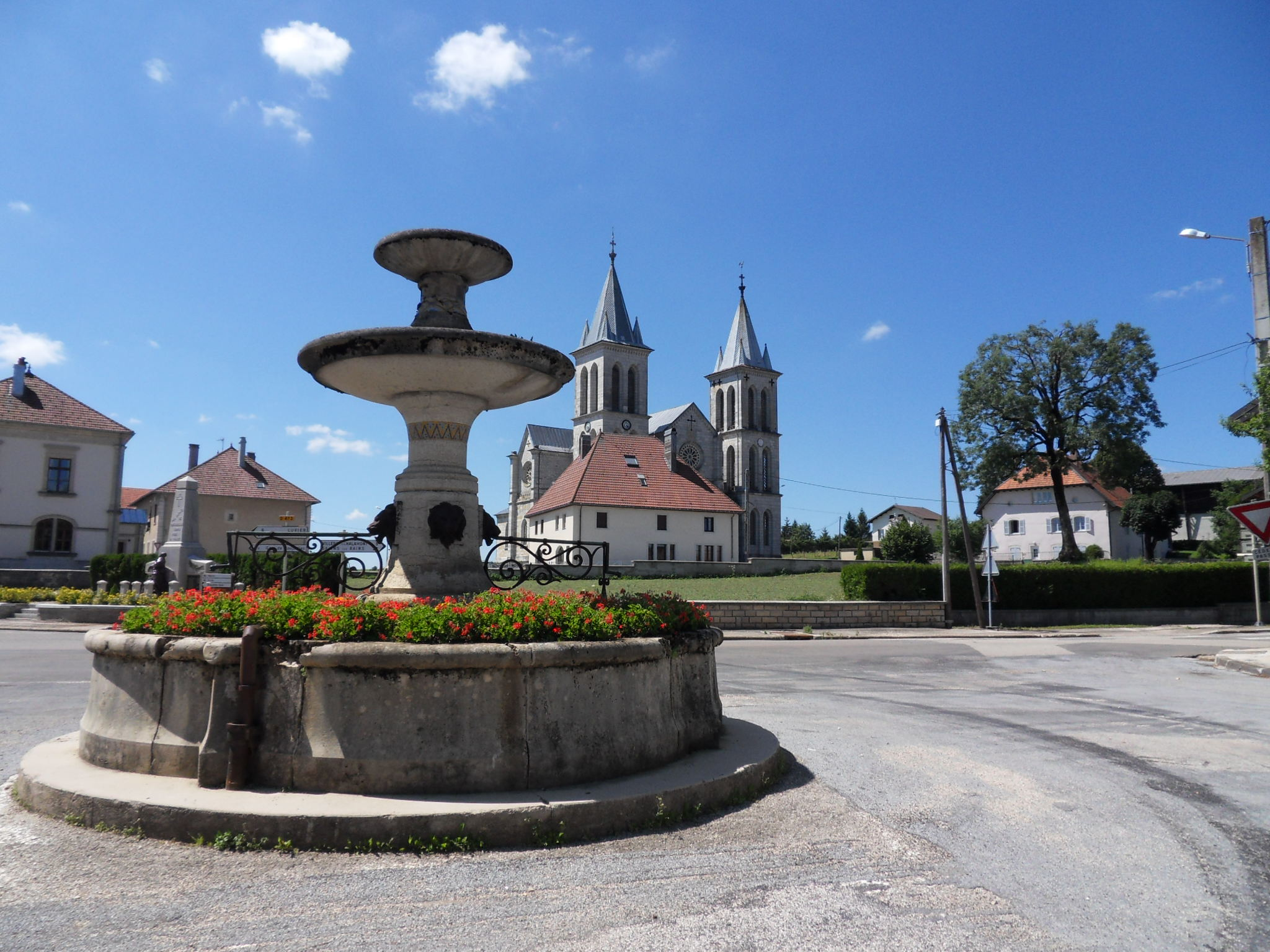
- The fountain and church in Boujailles

- Coat of arms
- Location of Boujailles
- Location within France Location within Bourgogne-Franche-Comté
- Coordinates: 46°53′19″N 6°04′52″E
- Country: France
- Region: Bourgogne-Franche-Comté
- Department: Doubs
- Arrondissement: Pontarlier
- Canton: Frasne
- Intercommunality: Plateau de Frasne et Val du Drugeon

Government
  - Mayor (2020–2026): Fabrice Picard
- Area^{1}: 28.22 km^{2} (10.90 sq mi)
- Highest elevation: 901 m (2,956 ft)
- Lowest elevation: 780 m (2,560 ft)
- Population (2023): 461
  - Density: 16.3/km^{2} (42.3/sq mi)
- Time zone: UTC+01:00 (CET)
  - Summer (DST): UTC+02:00 (CEST)
- INSEE/Postal code: 25079 /25560
- ^{1} French Land Register data, which excludes lakes, ponds, glaciers > 1 km^{2} (0.386 sq mi or 247 acres) and river estuaries.

Boujailles (French pronunciation: [buʒaj]) is a commune in the Doubs department in the Bourgogne-Franche-Comté region in eastern France.

== Population ==
Historical population
Year	Pop.	±% p.a.
1968	431	—
1975	368	−2.23%
1982	413	+1.66%
1990	354	−1.91%
1999	371	+0.52%
2007	416	+1.44%
2012	408	−0.39%
2017	428	+0.96%
2023	461	+1.25%
Source: INSEE

== See also ==
- Communes of the Doubs department
