= Canton of Frasne =

Administrative division of Doubs, France

Coordinates: 46.86°N 6.16°E

The canton of Frasne is an administrative division of the Doubs department, eastern France. It was created at the French canton reorganisation which came into effect in March 2015. Its seat is in Frasne.

It consists of the following communes:

1. Arc-sous-Montenot
2. Bannans
3. Bonnevaux
4. Boujailles
5. Bouverans
6. Brey-et-Maison-du-Bois
7. Bulle
8. Chapelle-des-Bois
9. Chapelle-d'Huin
10. Châtelblanc
11. Chaux-Neuve
12. Courvières
13. Le Crouzet
14. Dompierre-les-Tilleuls
15. Fourcatier-et-Maison-Neuve
16. Les Fourgs
17. Frasne
18. Gellin
19. Les Grangettes
20. Les Hôpitaux-Neufs
21. Les Hôpitaux-Vieux
22. Jougne
23. Labergement-Sainte-Marie
24. Levier
25. Longevilles-Mont-d'Or
26. Malbuisson
27. Malpas
28. Métabief
29. Montperreux
30. Mouthe
31. Oye-et-Pallet
32. Petite-Chaux
33. La Planée
34. Les Pontets
35. Reculfoz
36. Remoray-Boujeons
37. La Rivière-Drugeon
38. Rochejean
39. Rondefontaine
40. Saint-Antoine
41. Saint-Point-Lac
42. Sarrageois
43. Touillon-et-Loutelet
44. Vaux-et-Chantegrue
45. Les Villedieu
46. Villeneuve-d'Amont
47. Villers-sous-Chalamont
