= Rondefontaine =

- Commune
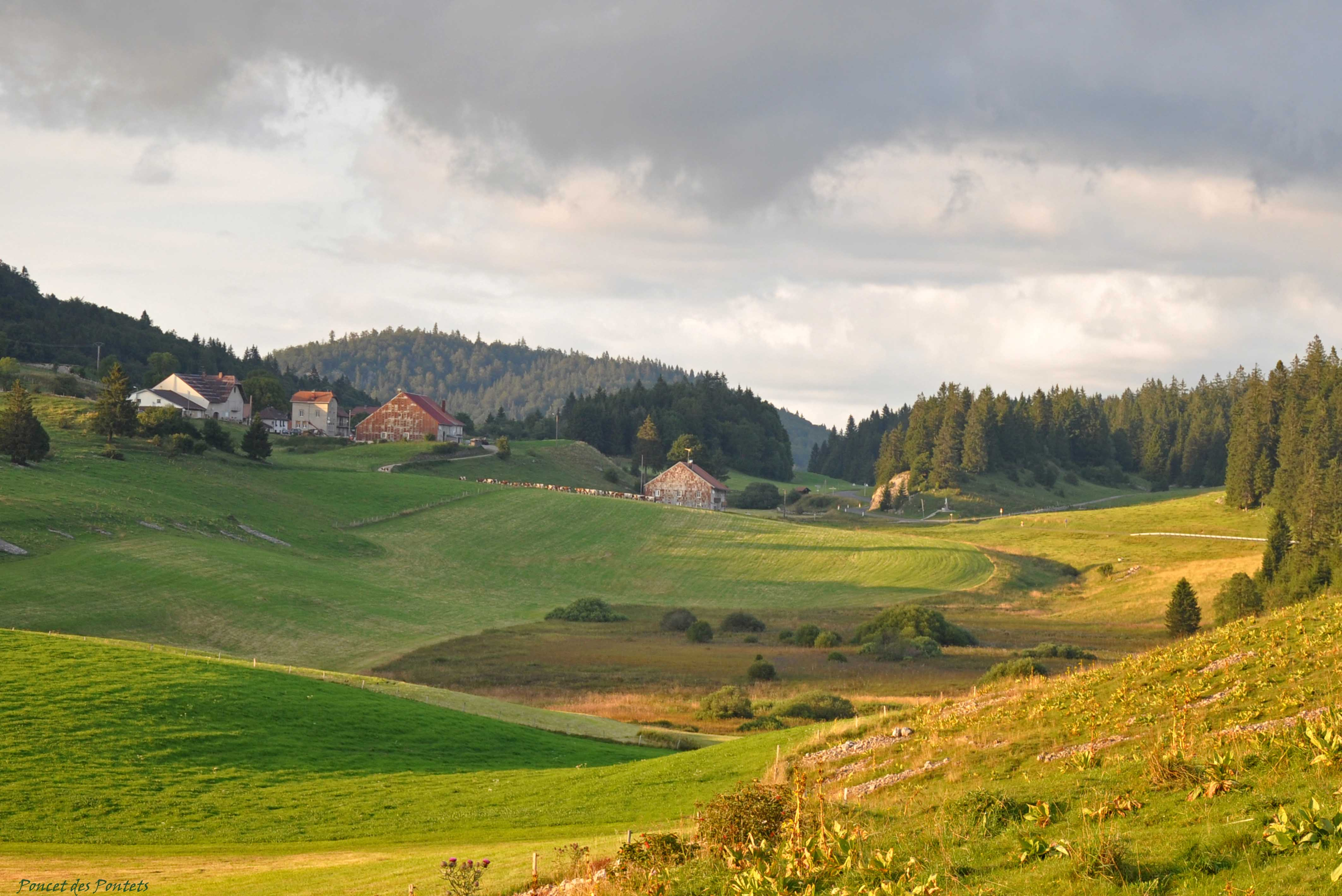
- A general view of Rondefontaine
- Location of Rondefontaine
- Location within France Location within Bourgogne-Franche-Comté
- Coordinates: 46°44′03″N 6°11′00″E
- Country: France
- Region: Bourgogne-Franche-Comté
- Department: Doubs
- Arrondissement: Pontarlier
- Canton: Frasne

Government
  - Mayor (2020–2026): Sylvain Fiévet
- Area^{1}: 2.72 km^{2} (1.05 sq mi)
- Highest elevation: 1,186 m (3,891 ft)
- Lowest elevation: 985 m (3,232 ft)
- Population (2023): 38
  - Density: 14/km^{2} (36/sq mi)
- Time zone: UTC+01:00 (CET)
  - Summer (DST): UTC+02:00 (CEST)
- INSEE/Postal code: 25501 /25240
- ^{1} French Land Register data, which excludes lakes, ponds, glaciers > 1 km^{2} (0.386 sq mi or 247 acres) and river estuaries.

Rondefontaine (French pronunciation: [ʁɔ̃dfɔ̃tɛn]) is a commune in the Doubs department in the Bourgogne-Franche-Comté region in eastern France.

== Geography ==
Rondefontaine lies 3 km (1.9 mi) from Mouthe in a narrow valley on a plateau. It has views of the Remoray and Saint-Point lakes, the Jura Mountains, and Switzerland.

== Population ==
Historical population
Year	Pop.	±% p.a.
1968	21	—
1975	16	−3.81%
1982	21	+3.96%
1990	24	+1.68%
1999	23	−0.47%
2007	28	+2.49%
2012	29	+0.70%
2017	34	+3.23%
2023	38	+1.87%
Source: INSEE

== See also ==
- Communes of the Doubs department
