= Saint-Antoine, Doubs =

Saint-Antoine
- Commune
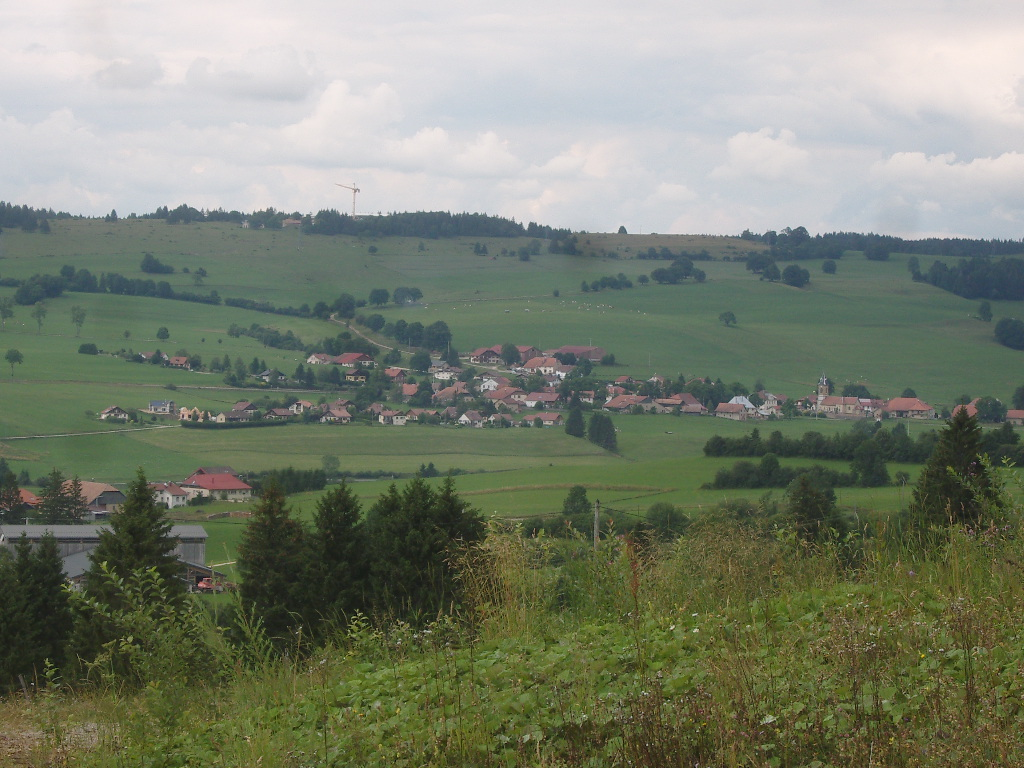
- A general view of Saint-Antoine
- Location of Saint-Antoine
- Location within France Location within Bourgogne-Franche-Comté
- Coordinates: 46°46′39″N 6°20′18″E
- Country: France
- Region: Bourgogne-Franche-Comté
- Department: Doubs
- Arrondissement: Pontarlier
- Canton: Frasne

Government
  - Mayor (2020–2026): Brigitte Prêtre
- Area^{1}: 4.51 km^{2} (1.74 sq mi)
- Highest elevation: 1,101 m (3,612 ft)
- Lowest elevation: 920 m (3,020 ft)
- Population (2023): 305
  - Density: 67.6/km^{2} (175/sq mi)
- Time zone: UTC+01:00 (CET)
  - Summer (DST): UTC+02:00 (CEST)
- INSEE/Postal code: 25514 /25370
- ^{1} French Land Register data, which excludes lakes, ponds, glaciers > 1 km^{2} (0.386 sq mi or 247 acres) and river estuaries.

Saint-Antoine (French pronunciation: [sɛ̃.t‿ɑ̃twan]) is a commune in the Doubs department in the Bourgogne-Franche-Comté region in eastern France.

== Geography ==
The commune lies 12 km (7.5 mi) from Mouthe.

== History ==
Saint-Antoine was earlier known as Rougebief after the stream that forms the boundary of the commune.

== Population ==
Historical population
Year	Pop.	±% p.a.
1968	154	—
1975	160	+0.55%
1982	197	+3.02%
1990	243	+2.66%
1999	276	+1.42%
2007	285	+0.40%
2012	325	+2.66%
2017	339	+0.85%
2023	305	−1.75%
Source: INSEE

== See also ==
- Communes of the Doubs department
