= Courvières =

- Commune
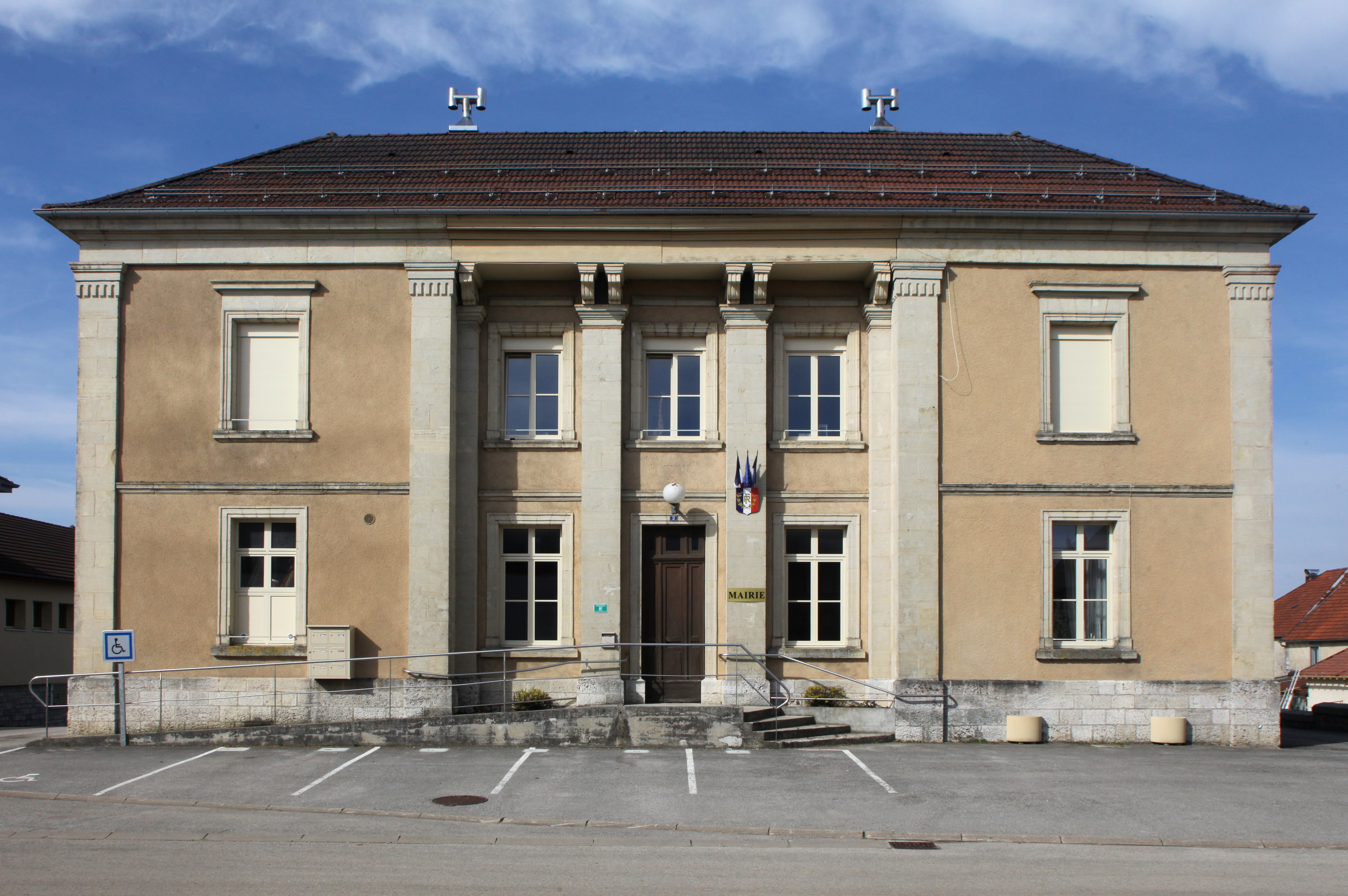
- The town hall in Courvières
- Location of Courvières
- Location within France Location within Bourgogne-Franche-Comté
- Coordinates: 46°52′N 6°07′E
- Country: France
- Region: Bourgogne-Franche-Comté
- Department: Doubs
- Arrondissement: Pontarlier
- Canton: Frasne
- Intercommunality: Plateau de Frasne et du Val du Drugeon

Government
  - Mayor (2024–2026): Bernard Girard
- Area^{1}: 10.94 km^{2} (4.22 sq mi)
- Highest elevation: 870 m (2,850 ft)
- Lowest elevation: 802 m (2,631 ft)
- Population (2023): 317
  - Density: 29.0/km^{2} (75.0/sq mi)
- Time zone: UTC+01:00 (CET)
  - Summer (DST): UTC+02:00 (CEST)
- INSEE/Postal code: 25176 /25560
- ^{1} French Land Register data, which excludes lakes, ponds, glaciers > 1 km^{2} (0.386 sq mi or 247 acres) and river estuaries.

Courvières (French pronunciation: [kuʁvjɛʁ]) is a commune in the Doubs department in the Bourgogne-Franche-Comté region in eastern France.

== Population ==
Historical population
Year	Pop.	±% p.a.
1968	215	—
1975	182	−2.35%
1982	194	+0.92%
1990	233	+2.32%
1999	266	+1.48%
2007	231	−1.75%
2012	280	+3.92%
2017	315	+2.38%
2023	317	+0.11%
Source: INSEE

== See also ==
- Communes of the Doubs department
