= Brey-et-Maison-du-Bois =

- Commune
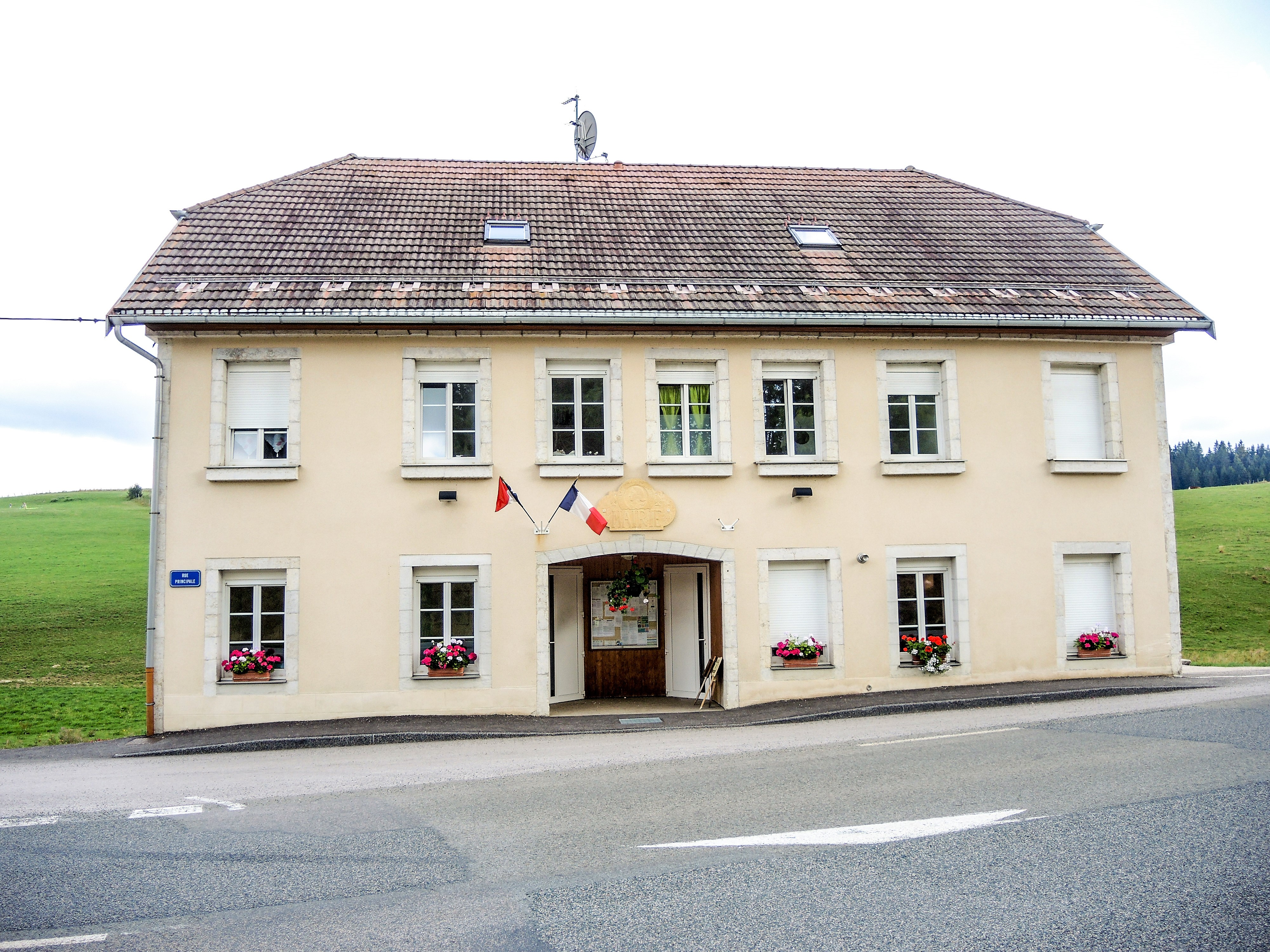
- The town hall in Le Brey
- Location of Brey-et-Maison-du-Bois
- Location within France Location within Bourgogne-Franche-Comté
- Coordinates: 46°44′42″N 6°15′08″E
- Country: France
- Region: Bourgogne-Franche-Comté
- Department: Doubs
- Arrondissement: Pontarlier
- Canton: Frasne

Government
  - Mayor (2020–2026): Didier Minniti
- Area^{1}: 6.18 km^{2} (2.39 sq mi)
- Highest elevation: 1,055 m (3,461 ft)
- Lowest elevation: 868 m (2,848 ft)
- Population (2023): 188
  - Density: 30.4/km^{2} (78.8/sq mi)
- Time zone: UTC+01:00 (CET)
  - Summer (DST): UTC+02:00 (CEST)
- INSEE/Postal code: 25096 /25240
- ^{1} French Land Register data, which excludes lakes, ponds, glaciers > 1 km^{2} (0.386 sq mi or 247 acres) and river estuaries.

Brey-et-Maison-du-Bois (French pronunciation: [bʁɛ e mɛzɔ̃ dy bwa]) is a commune in the Doubs department in the Bourgogne-Franche-Comté region in eastern France.

== Population ==
Historical population
Year	Pop.	±% p.a.
1968	101	—
1975	91	−1.48%
1982	74	−2.91%
1990	74	+0.00%
1999	100	+3.40%
2007	105	+0.61%
2012	92	−2.61%
2017	102	+2.09%
2023	188	+10.73%
Source: INSEE

== See also ==
- Communes of the Doubs department
