= Longevilles-Mont-d'Or =

- Commune
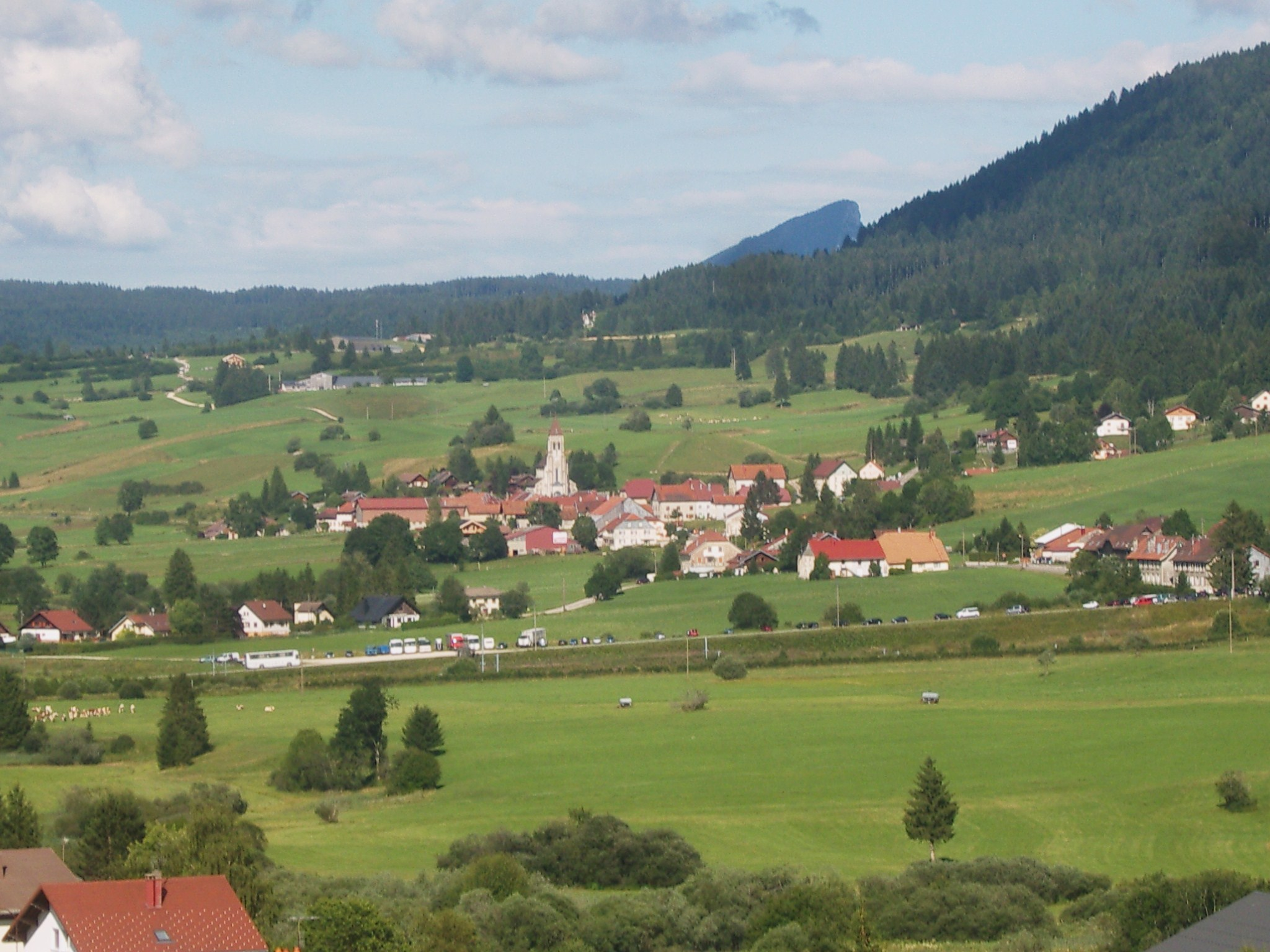
- A general view of Longevilles-Mont-d'Or
- Location of Longevilles-Mont-d'Or
- Location within France Location within Bourgogne-Franche-Comté
- Coordinates: 46°45′16″N 6°19′02″E
- Country: France
- Region: Bourgogne-Franche-Comté
- Department: Doubs
- Arrondissement: Pontarlier
- Canton: Frasne

Government
  - Mayor (2020–2026): Claude Jacquemin-Verguet
- Area^{1}: 13.25 km^{2} (5.12 sq mi)
- Highest elevation: 1,463 m (4,800 ft)
- Lowest elevation: 890 m (2,920 ft)
- Population (2023): 625
  - Density: 47.2/km^{2} (122/sq mi)
- Time zone: UTC+01:00 (CET)
  - Summer (DST): UTC+02:00 (CEST)
- INSEE/Postal code: 25348 /25370
- ^{1} French Land Register data, which excludes lakes, ponds, glaciers > 1 km^{2} (0.386 sq mi or 247 acres) and river estuaries.

Longevilles-Mont-d'Or (French pronunciation: [lɔ̃ʒvil mɔ̃ dɔʁ]; unofficial also Les Longevilles) is a commune in the Doubs department in the Bourgogne-Franche-Comté region in eastern France.

== Geography ==
The commune is located 10 km (6.2 mi) northeast of Mouthe. The village lies in a valley at the foot of the Mont d'Or, a massif that covers 90% of the territory of the commune.

The commune has views of the Alps and the Swiss plain.

=== Climate ===
Climate data for Longevilles, 1193m (1981−2010 normals, 1992−2015 extremes)
Month	Jan	Feb	Mar	Apr	May	Jun	Jul	Aug	Sep	Oct	Nov	Dec	Year
Record high °C (°F)	16.8 (62.2)	15.7 (60.3)	19.8 (67.6)	22.1 (71.8)	28.6 (83.5)	30.8 (87.4)	30.2 (86.4)	32.4 (90.3)	26.7 (80.1)	26.2 (79.2)	18.0 (64.4)	14.6 (58.3)	32.4 (90.3)
Mean daily maximum °C (°F)	2.2 (36.0)	3.0 (37.4)	5.8 (42.4)	9.4 (48.9)	14.6 (58.3)	18.3 (64.9)	20.1 (68.2)	19.7 (67.5)	15.2 (59.4)	12.1 (53.8)	5.6 (42.1)	2.5 (36.5)	10.7 (51.3)
Daily mean °C (°F)	−0.7 (30.7)	−0.3 (31.5)	2.1 (35.8)	5.3 (41.5)	10.2 (50.4)	13.5 (56.3)	15.3 (59.5)	15.1 (59.2)	11.1 (52.0)	8.2 (46.8)	2.5 (36.5)	−0.3 (31.5)	6.8 (44.3)
Mean daily minimum °C (°F)	−3.6 (25.5)	−3.6 (25.5)	−1.6 (29.1)	1.3 (34.3)	5.9 (42.6)	8.7 (47.7)	10.5 (50.9)	10.5 (50.9)	7.0 (44.6)	4.5 (40.1)	−0.5 (31.1)	−3.1 (26.4)	3.0 (37.4)
Record low °C (°F)	−18.3 (−0.9)	−18.6 (−1.5)	−17.2 (1.0)	−9.6 (14.7)	−3.7 (25.3)	−2.1 (28.2)	2.4 (36.3)	1.7 (35.1)	−2.7 (27.1)	−10.2 (13.6)	−13.1 (8.4)	−19.3 (−2.7)	−19.3 (−2.7)
Average precipitation mm (inches)	115.2 (4.54)	110.6 (4.35)	112.0 (4.41)	115.0 (4.53)	150.7 (5.93)	130.3 (5.13)	149.3 (5.88)	148.7 (5.85)	133.7 (5.26)	137.3 (5.41)	132.7 (5.22)	140.2 (5.52)	1,575.7 (62.03)
Source: Meteociel

== Population ==
Historical population
Year	Pop.	±% p.a.
1968	248	—
1975	253	+0.29%
1982	272	+1.04%
1990	323	+2.17%
1999	368	+1.46%
2007	402	+1.11%
2012	445	+2.05%
2017	581	+5.48%
2023	625	+1.22%
Source: INSEE

== Economy ==
Winter sports and tourism dominate the economy of the commune. It is one of the six communes that have operated the Métabief Mont-d'Or ski resort since 1970.

== See also ==
- Communes of the Doubs department
