= Reculfoz =

- Commune
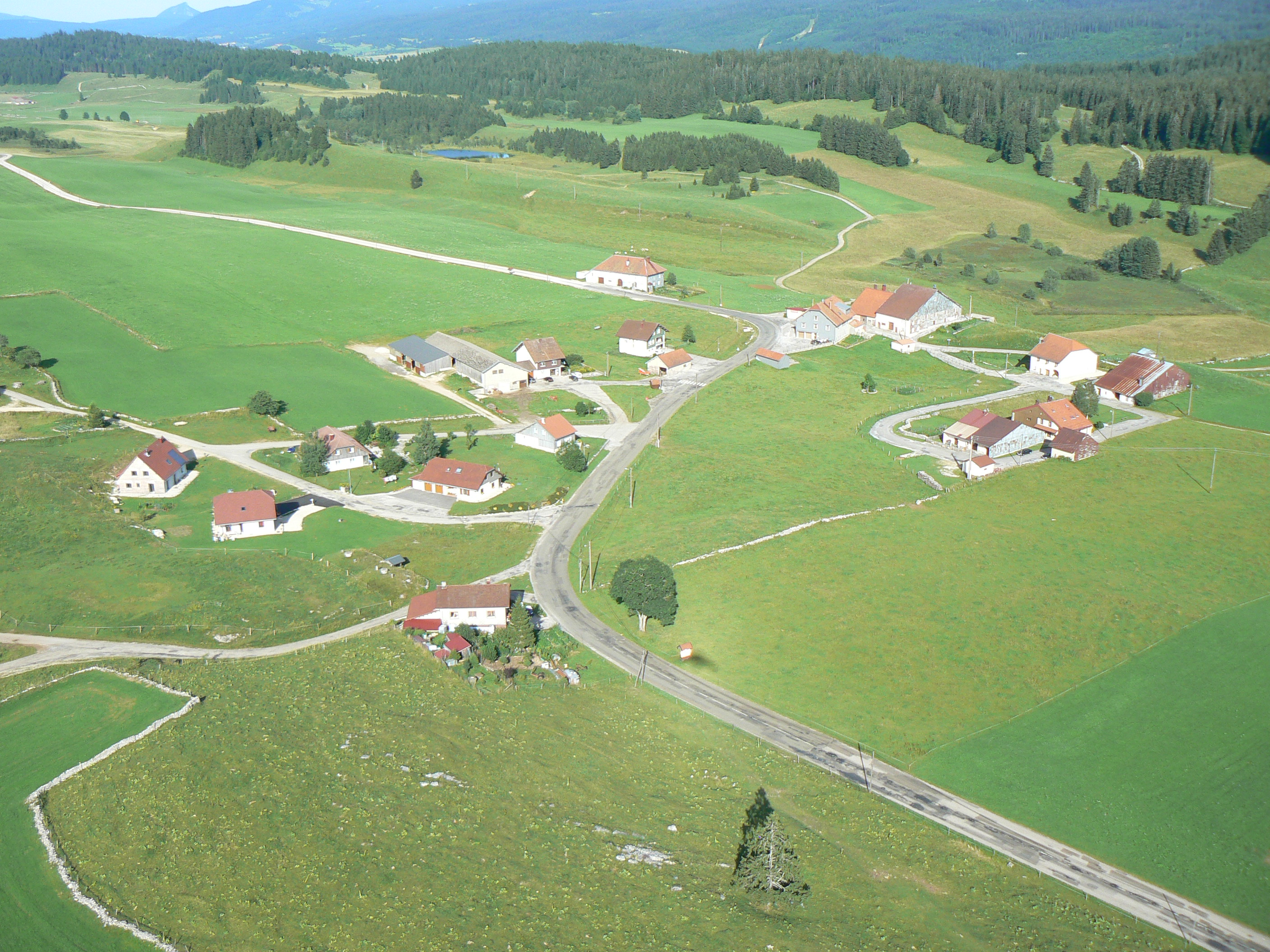
- A general view of Reculfoz
- Location of Reculfoz
- Location within France Location within Bourgogne-Franche-Comté
- Coordinates: 46°42′32″N 6°09′06″E
- Country: France
- Region: Bourgogne-Franche-Comté
- Department: Doubs
- Arrondissement: Pontarlier
- Canton: Frasne

Government
  - Mayor (2020–2026): Jean-Yves Bouveret
- Area^{1}: 2.54 km^{2} (0.98 sq mi)
- Highest elevation: 1,212 m (3,976 ft)
- Lowest elevation: 1,000 m (3,300 ft)
- Population (2023): 45
  - Density: 18/km^{2} (46/sq mi)
- Time zone: UTC+01:00 (CET)
  - Summer (DST): UTC+02:00 (CEST)
- INSEE/Postal code: 25483 /25240
- ^{1} French Land Register data, which excludes lakes, ponds, glaciers > 1 km^{2} (0.386 sq mi or 247 acres) and river estuaries.

Reculfoz (French pronunciation: [ʁəkylfo]) is a commune in the Doubs department in the Bourgogne-Franche-Comté region in eastern France.

== Population ==
Historical population
Year	Pop.	±% p.a.
1968	37	—
1975	29	−3.42%
1982	27	−1.02%
1990	40	+5.04%
1999	40	+0.00%
2007	51	+3.08%
2012	48	−1.21%
2017	41	−3.10%
2023	45	+1.56%
Source: INSEE

== See also ==
- Communes of the Doubs department
