= Villers-sous-Chalamont =

- Commune
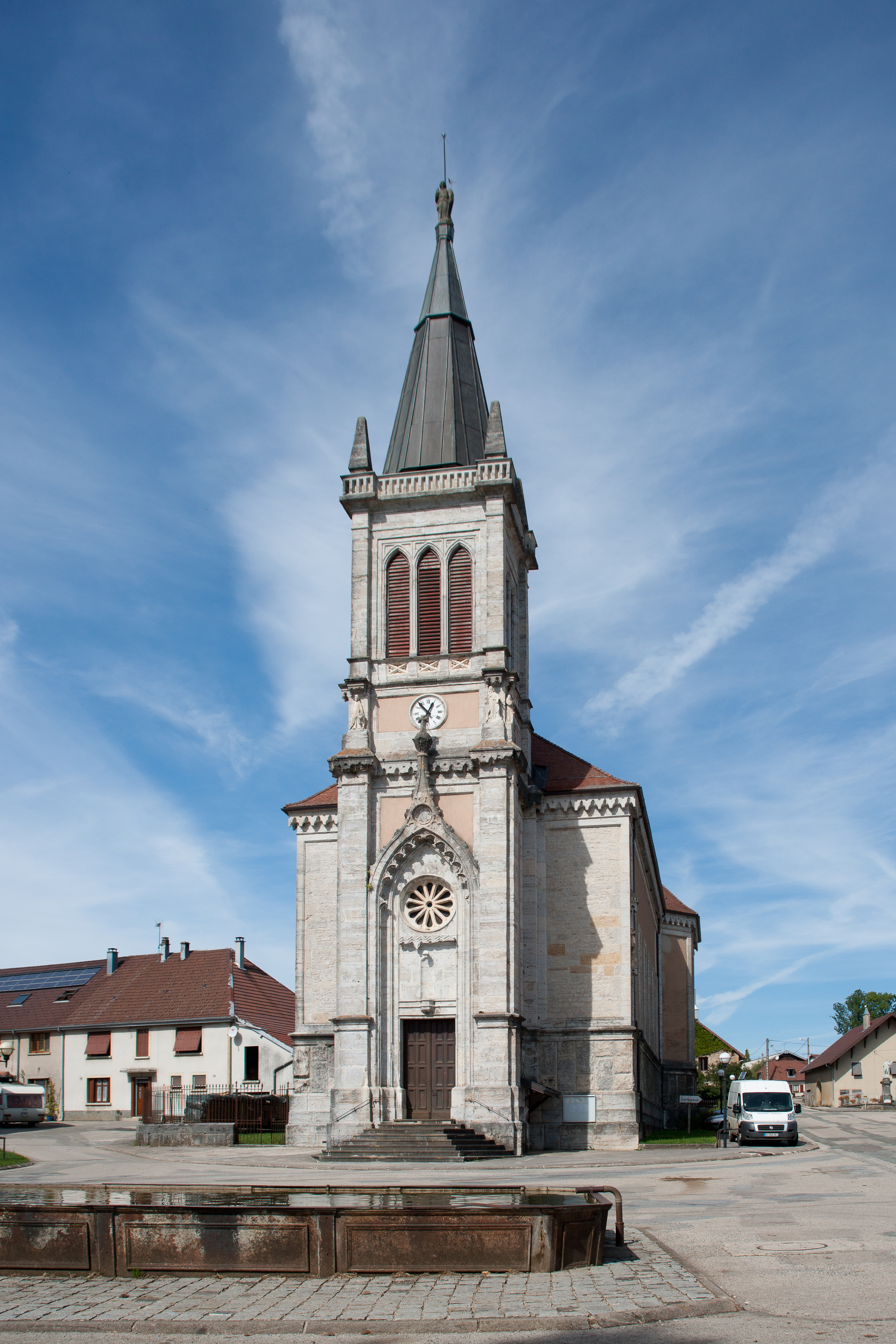
- The church in Villers-sous-Chalamont
- Location of Villers-sous-Chalamont
- Location within France Location within Bourgogne-Franche-Comté
- Coordinates: 46°54′21″N 6°02′32″E
- Country: France
- Region: Bourgogne-Franche-Comté
- Department: Doubs
- Arrondissement: Pontarlier
- Canton: Frasne
- Intercommunality: Altitude 800

Government
  - Mayor (2020–2026): Claude Courvoisier
- Area^{1}: 22.18 km^{2} (8.56 sq mi)
- Highest elevation: 901 m (2,956 ft)
- Lowest elevation: 658 m (2,159 ft)
- Population (2023): 293
  - Density: 13.2/km^{2} (34.2/sq mi)
- Time zone: UTC+01:00 (CET)
  - Summer (DST): UTC+02:00 (CEST)
- INSEE/Postal code: 25627 /25270
- ^{1} French Land Register data, which excludes lakes, ponds, glaciers > 1 km^{2} (0.386 sq mi or 247 acres) and river estuaries.

Villers-sous-Chalamont (French pronunciation: [vilɛʁ su ʃalamɔ̃]; Arpitan: Vela) is a commune in the Doubs department in the Bourgogne-Franche-Comté region in eastern France.

== Population ==
Historical population
Year	Pop.	±% p.a.
1968	320	—
1975	247	−3.63%
1982	233	−0.83%
1990	239	+0.32%
1999	250	+0.50%
2007	278	+1.34%
2012	262	−1.18%
2017	296	+2.47%
2023	293	−0.17%
Source: INSEE

== See also ==
- Communes of the Doubs department
