= Bannans =

- Commune
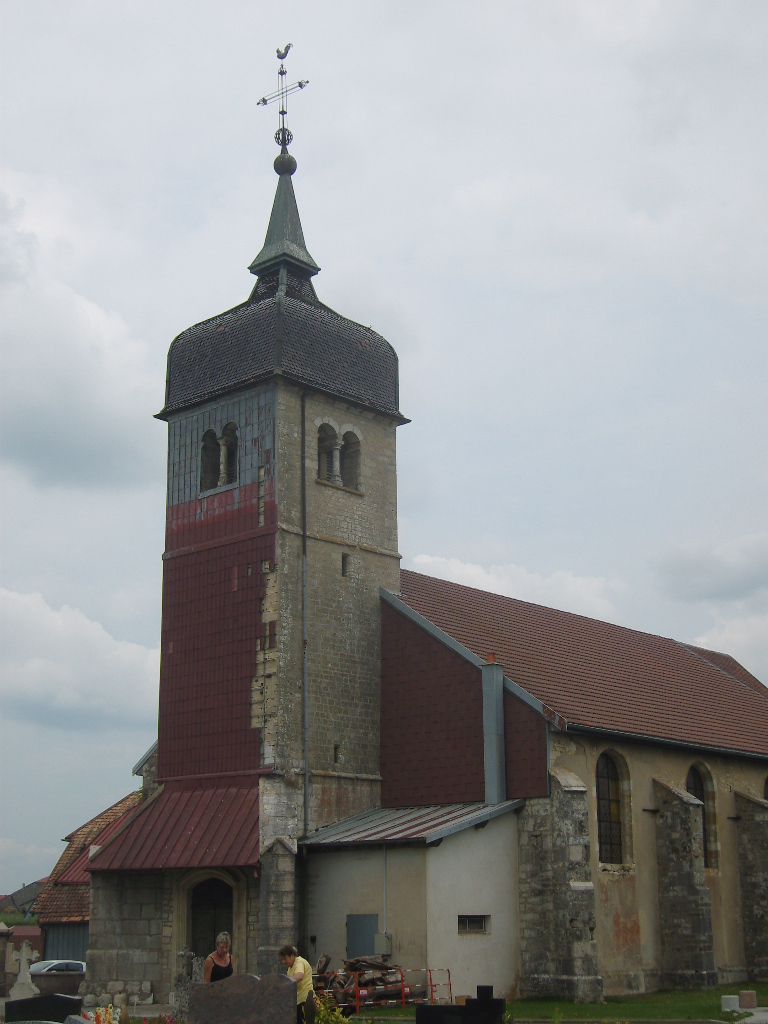
- The church in Bannans

- Coat of arms
- Location of Bannans
- Location within France Location within Bourgogne-Franche-Comté
- Coordinates: 46°53′14″N 6°14′25″E
- Country: France
- Region: Bourgogne-Franche-Comté
- Department: Doubs
- Arrondissement: Pontarlier
- Canton: Frasne
- Intercommunality: Plateau de Frasne et du Val du Drugeon

Government
  - Mayor (2020–2026): Louis Girod
- Area^{1}: 11.56 km^{2} (4.46 sq mi)
- Highest elevation: 873 m (2,864 ft)
- Lowest elevation: 808 m (2,651 ft)
- Population (2023): 370
  - Density: 32/km^{2} (83/sq mi)
- Time zone: UTC+01:00 (CET)
  - Summer (DST): UTC+02:00 (CEST)
- INSEE/Postal code: 25041 /25560
- ^{1} French Land Register data, which excludes lakes, ponds, glaciers > 1 km^{2} (0.386 sq mi or 247 acres) and river estuaries.

Bannans (French pronunciation: [banɑ̃]) is a commune in the Doubs department in the Bourgogne-Franche-Comté region in eastern France.

== Population ==
Historical population
Year	Pop.	±% p.a.
1968	237	—
1975	205	−2.05%
1982	254	+3.11%
1990	296	+1.93%
1999	311	+0.55%
2007	348	+1.42%
2012	324	−1.42%
2017	369	+2.64%
2023	370	+0.05%
Source: INSEE

== See also ==
- Communes of the Doubs department
