= Petite-Chaux =

- Commune
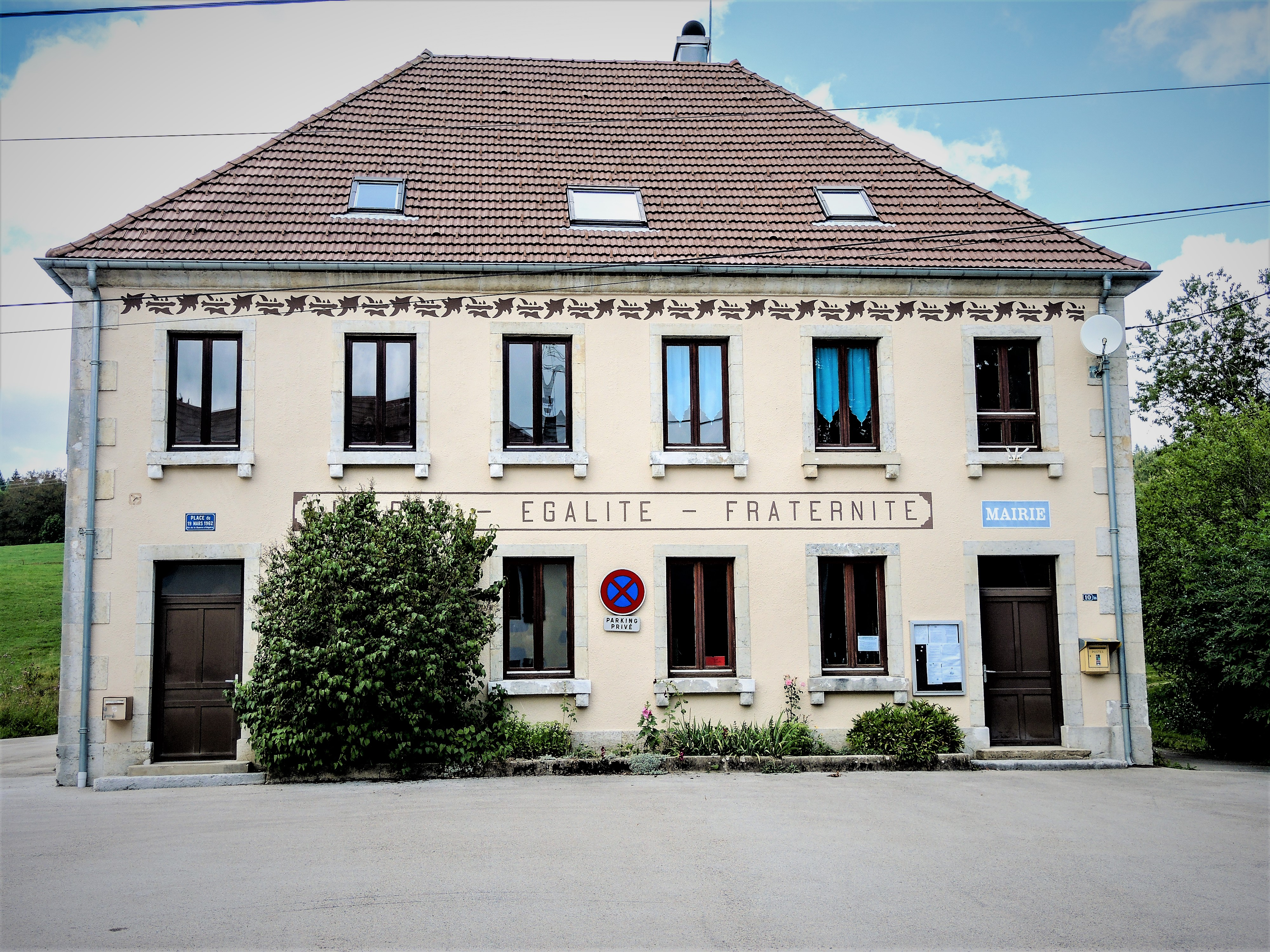
- The town hall in Petite-Chaux
- Location of Petite-Chaux
- Location within France Location within Bourgogne-Franche-Comté
- Coordinates: 46°41′41″N 6°10′07″E
- Country: France
- Region: Bourgogne-Franche-Comté
- Department: Doubs
- Arrondissement: Pontarlier
- Canton: Frasne

Government
  - Mayor (2020–2026): Patricia Todeschini
- Area^{1}: 9.81 km^{2} (3.79 sq mi)
- Highest elevation: 1,286 m (4,219 ft)
- Lowest elevation: 955 m (3,133 ft)
- Population (2023): 177
  - Density: 18.0/km^{2} (46.7/sq mi)
- Time zone: UTC+01:00 (CET)
  - Summer (DST): UTC+02:00 (CEST)
- INSEE/Postal code: 25451 /25240
- ^{1} French Land Register data, which excludes lakes, ponds, glaciers > 1 km^{2} (0.386 sq mi or 247 acres) and river estuaries.

Petite-Chaux (French pronunciation: [pətit ʃo]) is a commune in the Doubs département in the Bourgogne-Franche-Comté region in eastern France.

== Population ==
Historical population
Year	Pop.	±% p.a.
1968	114	—
1975	64	−7.92%
1982	77	+2.68%
1990	128	+6.56%
1999	129	+0.09%
2007	127	−0.20%
2012	147	+2.97%
2017	143	−0.55%
2023	177	+3.62%
Source: INSEE

== See also ==
- Communes of the Doubs department
