= Châtelblanc =

- Commune
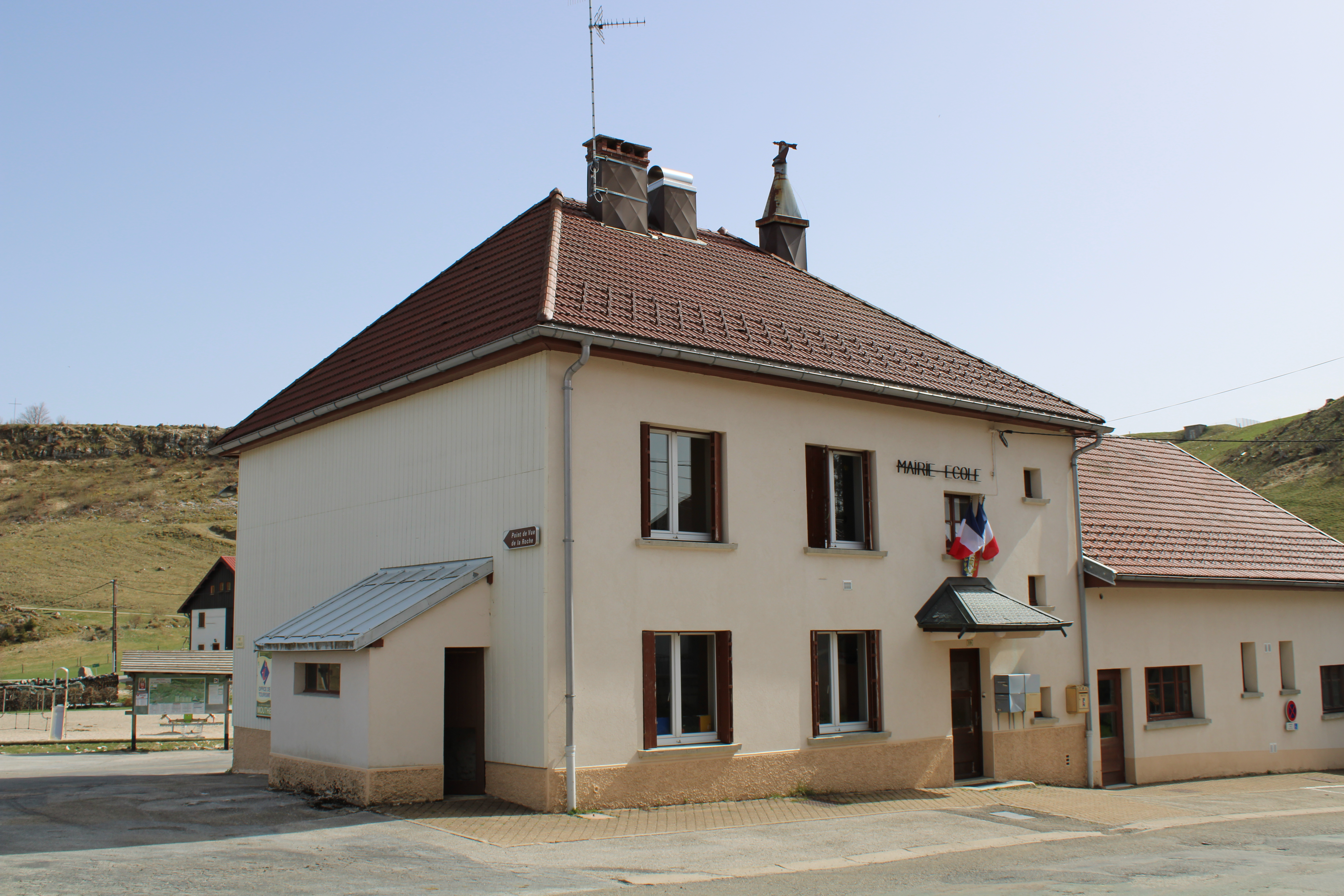
- The town hall in Châtelblanc
- Location of Châtelblanc
- Location within France Location within Bourgogne-Franche-Comté
- Coordinates: 46°40′25″N 6°07′00″E
- Country: France
- Region: Bourgogne-Franche-Comté
- Department: Doubs
- Arrondissement: Pontarlier
- Canton: Frasne
- Intercommunality: Lacs et Montagnes du Haut-Doubs

Government
  - Mayor (2024–2026): Claude Tarby
- Area^{1}: 20.79 km^{2} (8.03 sq mi)
- Elevation: 1,000 m (3,300 ft)
- Highest elevation: 1,271 m (4,170 ft)
- Lowest elevation: 901 m (2,956 ft)
- Population (2023): 117
  - Density: 5.63/km^{2} (14.6/sq mi)
- Time zone: UTC+01:00 (CET)
  - Summer (DST): UTC+02:00 (CEST)
- INSEE/Postal code: 25131 /25240
- ^{1} French Land Register data, which excludes lakes, ponds, glaciers > 1 km^{2} (0.386 sq mi or 247 acres) and river estuaries.

Châtelblanc (French pronunciation: [ʃatɛlblɑ̃]; Arpitan: Tsétiâ Blanc) is a commune in the Doubs department in the Bourgogne-Franche-Comté region in eastern France.

== Population ==
Historical population
Year	Pop.	±% p.a.
1968	131	—
1975	123	−0.90%
1982	114	−1.08%
1990	104	−1.14%
1999	102	−0.22%
2007	104	+0.24%
2012	116	+2.21%
2017	120	+0.68%
2023	117	−0.42%
Source: INSEE

== See also ==
- Communes of the Doubs department
