= Montperreux =

- Commune
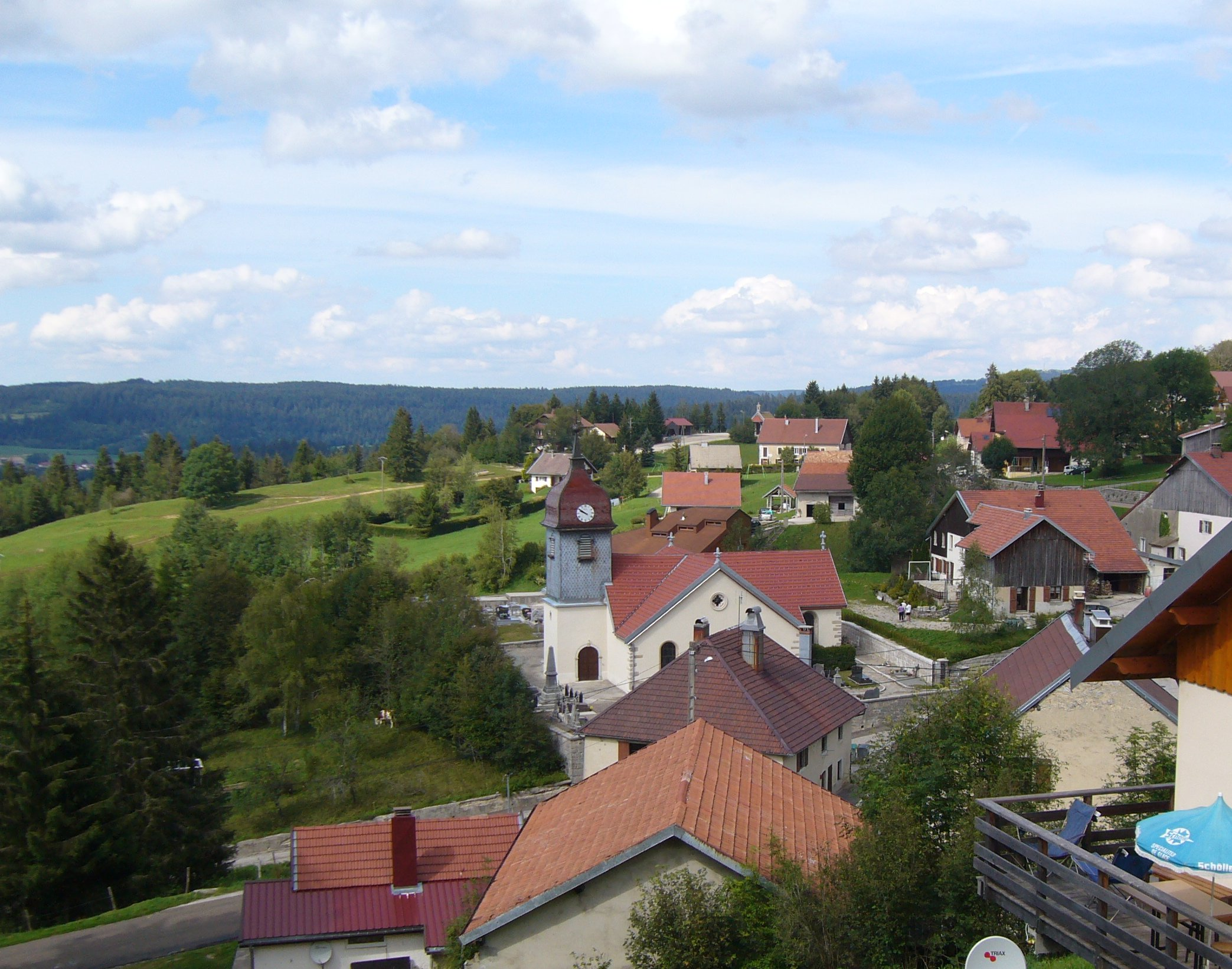
- A general view of Montperreux

- Coat of arms
- Location of Montperreux
- Location within France Location within Bourgogne-Franche-Comté
- Coordinates: 46°49′36″N 6°20′32″E
- Country: France
- Region: Bourgogne-Franche-Comté
- Department: Doubs
- Arrondissement: Pontarlier
- Canton: Frasne

Government
  - Mayor (2020–2026): Jean-Luc Barnoux
- Area^{1}: 11.61 km^{2} (4.48 sq mi)
- Highest elevation: 1,112 m (3,648 ft)
- Lowest elevation: 848 m (2,782 ft)
- Population (2023): 940
  - Density: 81/km^{2} (210/sq mi)
- Time zone: UTC+01:00 (CET)
  - Summer (DST): UTC+02:00 (CEST)
- INSEE/Postal code: 25405 /25160
- ^{1} French Land Register data, which excludes lakes, ponds, glaciers > 1 km^{2} (0.386 sq mi or 247 acres) and river estuaries.

Montperreux (French pronunciation: [mɔ̃pɛʁø]) is a commune in the Doubs department in the Bourgogne-Franche-Comté region in eastern France.

== Geography ==
Montperreux lies 11 km (6.8 mi) south of Pontarlier in the Jura Mountains.

== Population ==
Historical population
Year	Pop.	±% p.a.
1968	201	—
1975	215	+0.97%
1982	251	+2.24%
1990	422	+6.71%
1999	605	+4.08%
2007	767	+3.01%
2012	770	+0.08%
2017	840	+1.76%
2023	940	+1.89%
Source: INSEE

== See also ==
- Communes of the Doubs department
