= Oye-et-Pallet =

- Commune
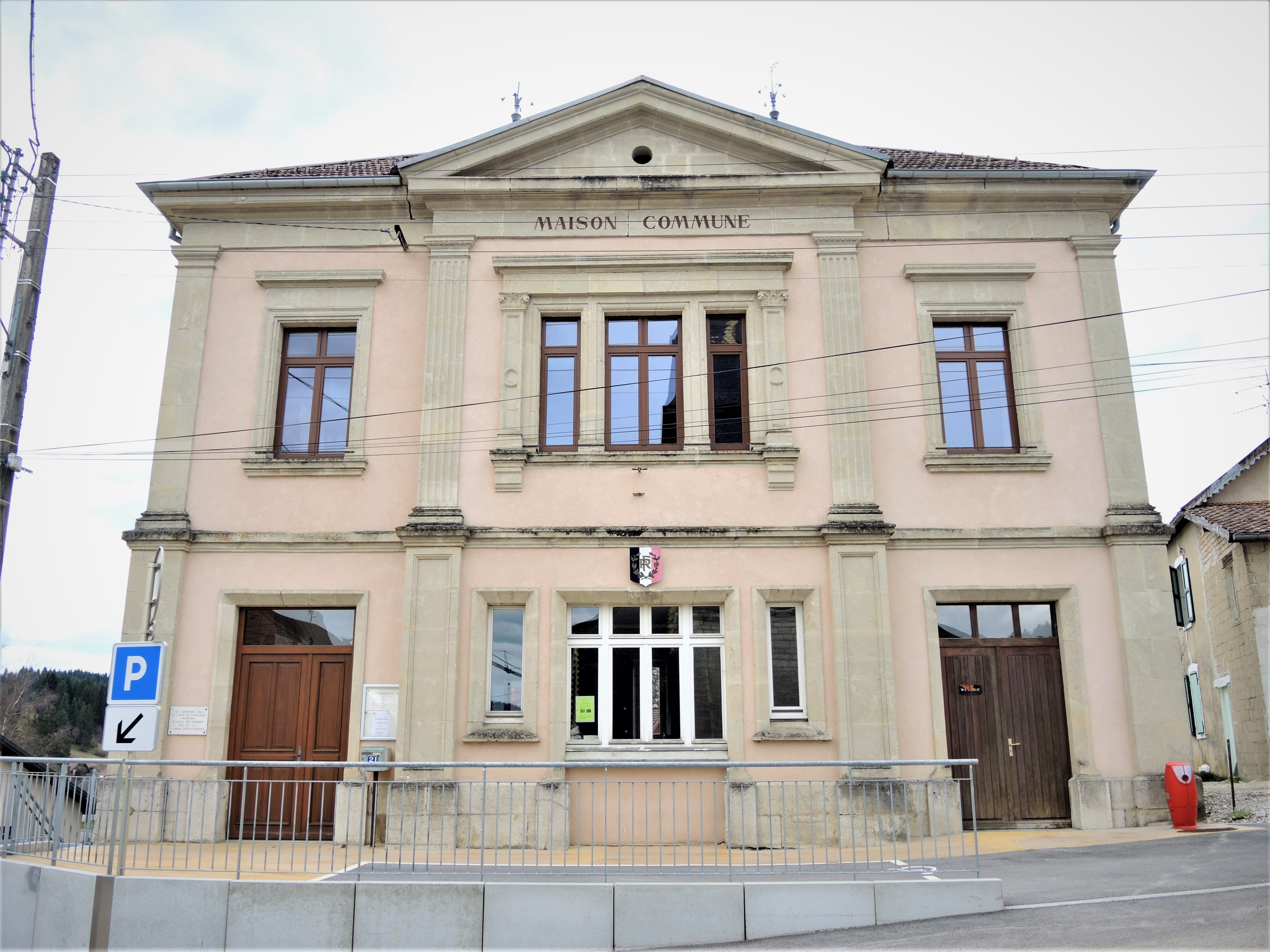
- The town hall in Oye-et-Pallet

- Coat of arms
- Location of Oye-et-Pallet
- Location within France Location within Bourgogne-Franche-Comté
- Coordinates: 46°51′14″N 6°20′06″E
- Country: France
- Region: Bourgogne-Franche-Comté
- Department: Doubs
- Arrondissement: Pontarlier
- Canton: Frasne

Government
  - Mayor (2020–2026): Michel Faivre
- Area^{1}: 10.45 km^{2} (4.03 sq mi)
- Highest elevation: 1,046 m (3,432 ft)
- Lowest elevation: 841 m (2,759 ft)
- Population (2023): 709
  - Density: 67.8/km^{2} (176/sq mi)
- Time zone: UTC+01:00 (CET)
  - Summer (DST): UTC+02:00 (CEST)
- INSEE/Postal code: 25442 /25160
- ^{1} French Land Register data, which excludes lakes, ponds, glaciers > 1 km^{2} (0.386 sq mi or 247 acres) and river estuaries.

Oye-et-Pallet (French pronunciation: [wa e palɛ]) is a commune in the Doubs department in the Bourgogne-Franche-Comté region in eastern France.

== Population ==
Historical population
Year	Pop.	±% p.a.
1968	332	—
1975	340	+0.34%
1982	369	+1.18%
1990	467	+2.99%
1999	579	+2.42%
2007	691	+2.24%
2012	715	+0.69%
2017	726	+0.31%
2023	709	−0.39%
Source: INSEE

== See also ==
- Communes of the Doubs department
