= Touillon-et-Loutelet =

- Commune
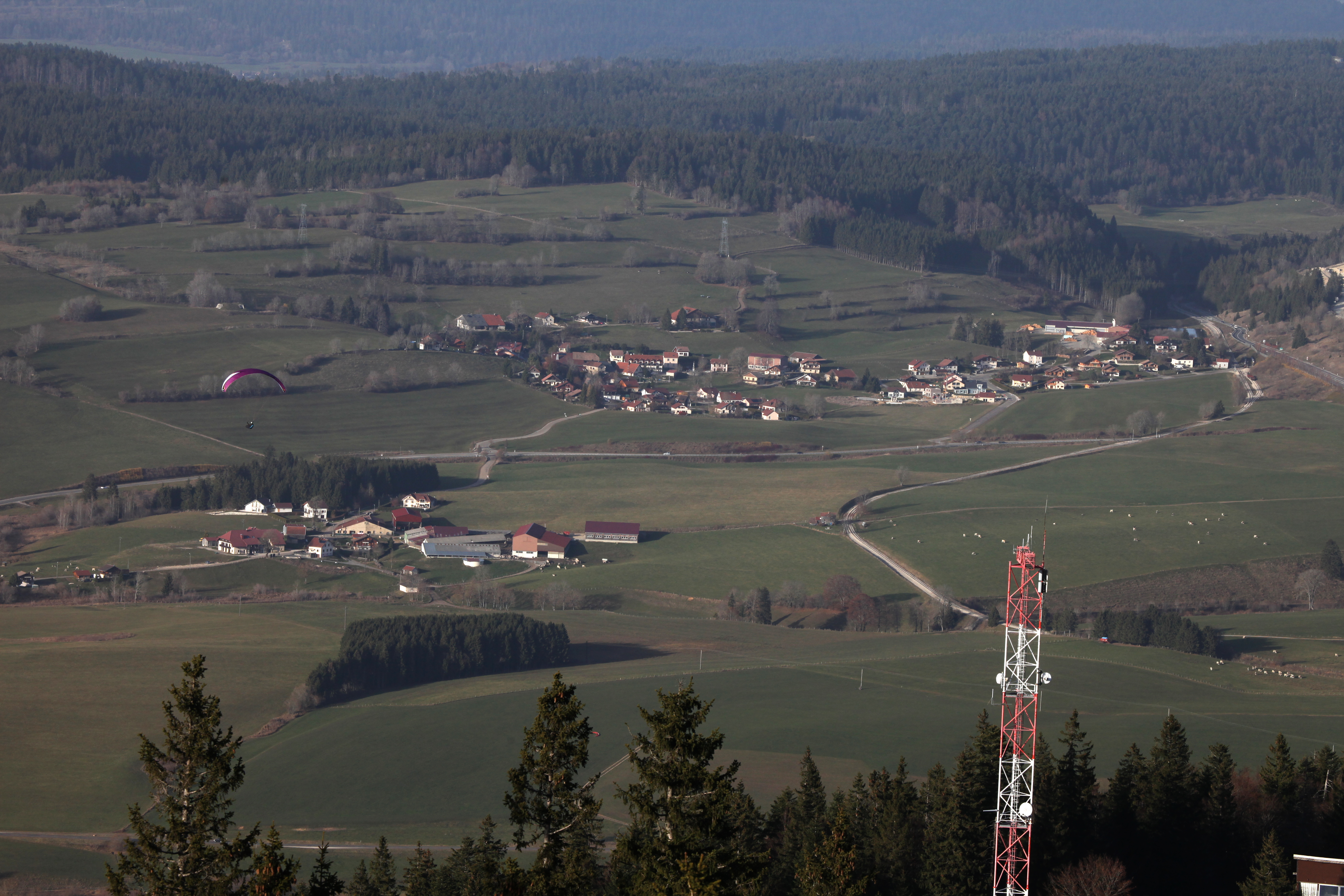
- A general view of Touillon-et-Loutelet
- Location of Touillon-et-Loutelet
- Location within France Location within Bourgogne-Franche-Comté
- Coordinates: 46°47′36″N 6°21′09″E
- Country: France
- Region: Bourgogne-Franche-Comté
- Department: Doubs
- Arrondissement: Pontarlier
- Canton: Frasne

Government
  - Mayor (2020–2026): Sébastien Populaire
- Area^{1}: 4.72 km^{2} (1.82 sq mi)
- Highest elevation: 1,114 m (3,655 ft)
- Lowest elevation: 958 m (3,143 ft)
- Population (2023): 262
  - Density: 55.5/km^{2} (144/sq mi)
- Time zone: UTC+01:00 (CET)
  - Summer (DST): UTC+02:00 (CEST)
- INSEE/Postal code: 25565 /25370
- ^{1} French Land Register data, which excludes lakes, ponds, glaciers > 1 km^{2} (0.386 sq mi or 247 acres) and river estuaries.

Touillon-et-Loutelet (French pronunciation: [tujɔ̃ e lutlɛ]) is a commune in the Doubs department in the Bourgogne-Franche-Comté region in eastern France.

== Geography ==
The commune lies 15 km (9.3 mi) south of Pontarlier.

== Population ==
Historical population
Year	Pop.	±% p.a.
1968	56	—
1975	58	+0.50%
1982	72	+3.14%
1990	101	+4.32%
1999	149	+4.41%
2007	211	+4.44%
2012	234	+2.09%
2017	269	+2.83%
2023	262	−0.44%
Source: INSEE

== See also ==
- Communes of the Doubs department
