= La Planée =

- Commune
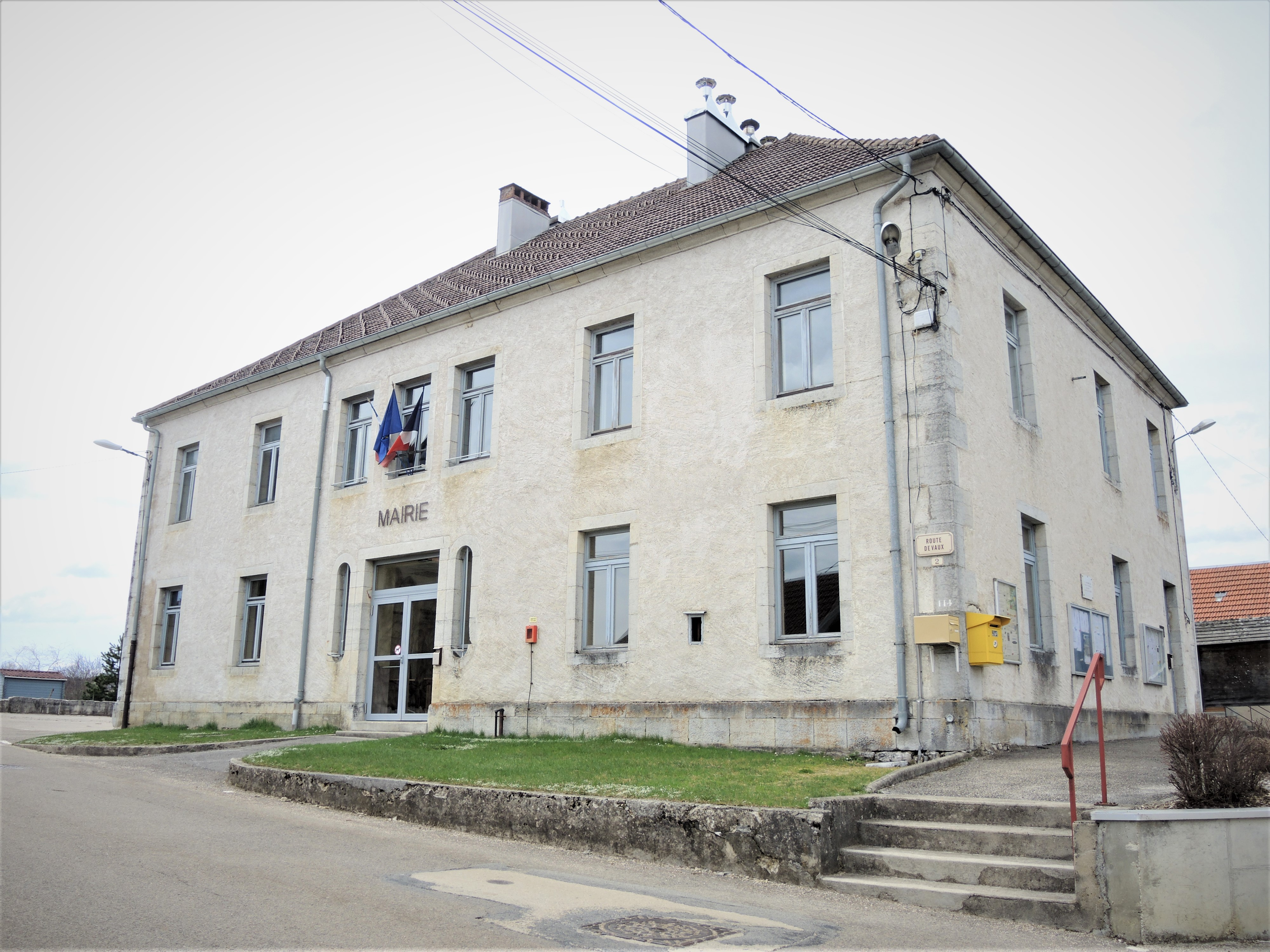
- The town hall in La Planée
- Location of La Planée
- Location within France Location within Bourgogne-Franche-Comté
- Coordinates: 46°50′28″N 6°16′58″E
- Country: France
- Region: Bourgogne-Franche-Comté
- Department: Doubs
- Arrondissement: Pontarlier
- Canton: Frasne

Government
  - Mayor (2022–2026): Laurette Pagnier
- Area^{1}: 13.0 km^{2} (5.0 sq mi)
- Highest elevation: 1,112 m (3,648 ft)
- Lowest elevation: 886 m (2,907 ft)
- Population (2023): 332
  - Density: 25.5/km^{2} (66.1/sq mi)
- Time zone: UTC+01:00 (CET)
  - Summer (DST): UTC+02:00 (CEST)
- INSEE/Postal code: 25459 /25160
- ^{1} French Land Register data, which excludes lakes, ponds, glaciers > 1 km^{2} (0.386 sq mi or 247 acres) and river estuaries.

La Planée (French pronunciation: [la plane]) is a commune in the Doubs department in the Bourgogne-Franche-Comté region in eastern France.

== Population ==
Historical population
| Year | Pop. | ±% p.a. |
|---|---|---|
| 1968 | 167 | — |
| 1975 | 133 | −3.20% |
| 1982 | 154 | +2.12% |
| 1990 | 167 | +1.02% |
| 1999 | 200 | +2.02% |
| 2007 | 228 | +1.65% |
| 2012 | 247 | +1.61% |
| 2017 | 296 | +3.69% |
| 2023 | 332 | +1.93% |
Source: INSEE

== See also ==
- Communes of the Doubs department
