= Bulle, Doubs =

Bulle
- Commune
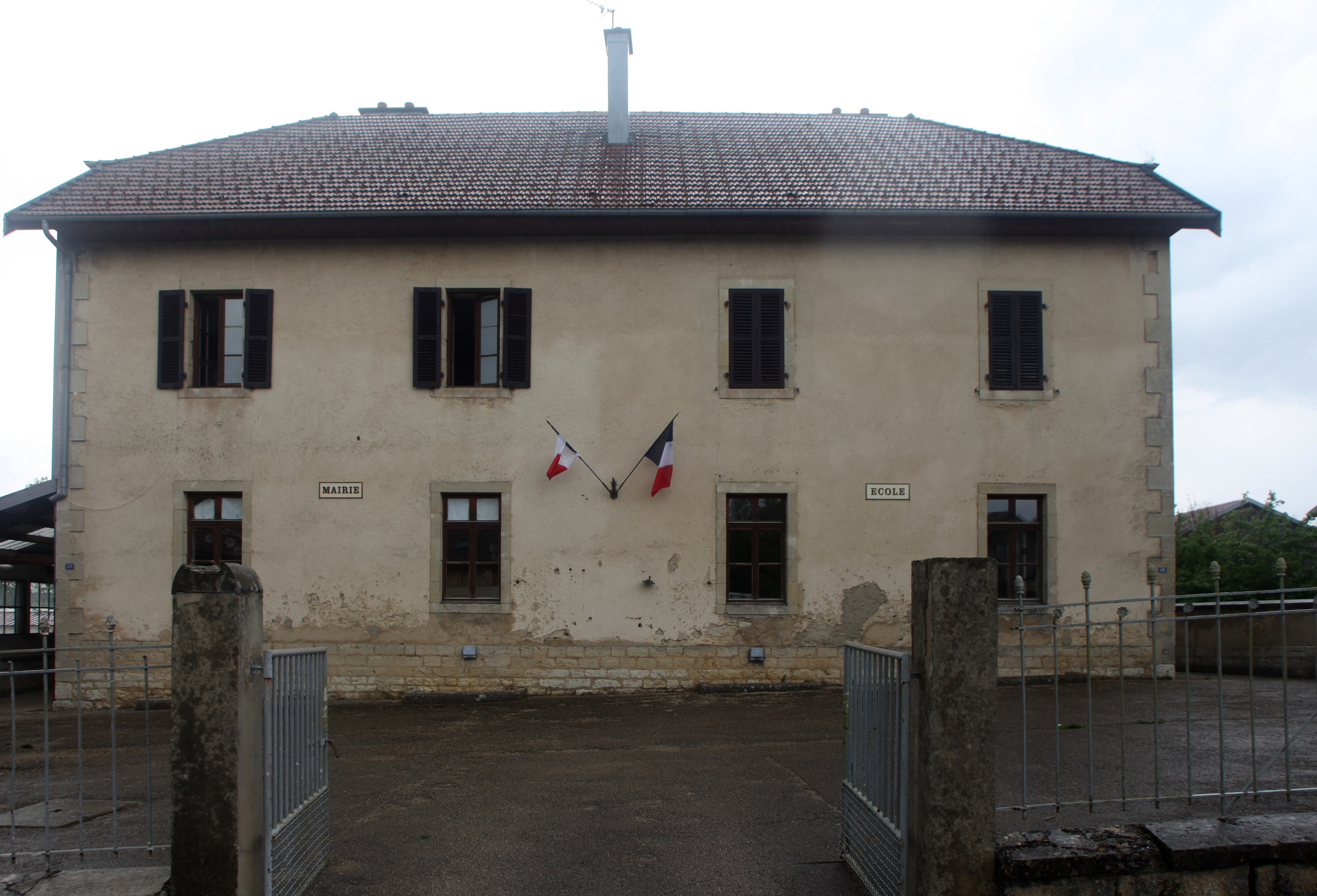
- The town hall in Bulle

- Coat of arms
- Location of Bulle
- Location within France Location within Bourgogne-Franche-Comté
- Coordinates: 46°53′41″N 6°13′26″E
- Country: France
- Region: Bourgogne-Franche-Comté
- Department: Doubs
- Arrondissement: Pontarlier
- Canton: Frasne
- Intercommunality: Plateau de Frasne et Val du Drugeon

Government
  - Mayor (2020–2026): Christophe André
- Area^{1}: 14.03 km^{2} (5.42 sq mi)
- Highest elevation: 876 m (2,874 ft)
- Lowest elevation: 810 m (2,660 ft)
- Population (2023): 505
  - Density: 36.0/km^{2} (93.2/sq mi)
- Time zone: UTC+01:00 (CET)
  - Summer (DST): UTC+02:00 (CEST)
- INSEE/Postal code: 25100 /25560
- ^{1} French Land Register data, which excludes lakes, ponds, glaciers > 1 km^{2} (0.386 sq mi or 247 acres) and river estuaries.

Bulle (French pronunciation: [byl]) is a commune in the Doubs department in the Bourgogne-Franche-Comté region in eastern France.

== Population ==
Historical population
Year	Pop.	±% p.a.
1968	253	—
1975	232	−1.23%
1982	286	+3.03%
1990	320	+1.41%
1999	331	+0.38%
2007	377	+1.64%
2012	402	+1.29%
2017	433	+1.50%
2023	505	+2.60%
Source: INSEE

== See also ==
- Communes of the Doubs department
