= Arc-sous-Montenot =

- Commune
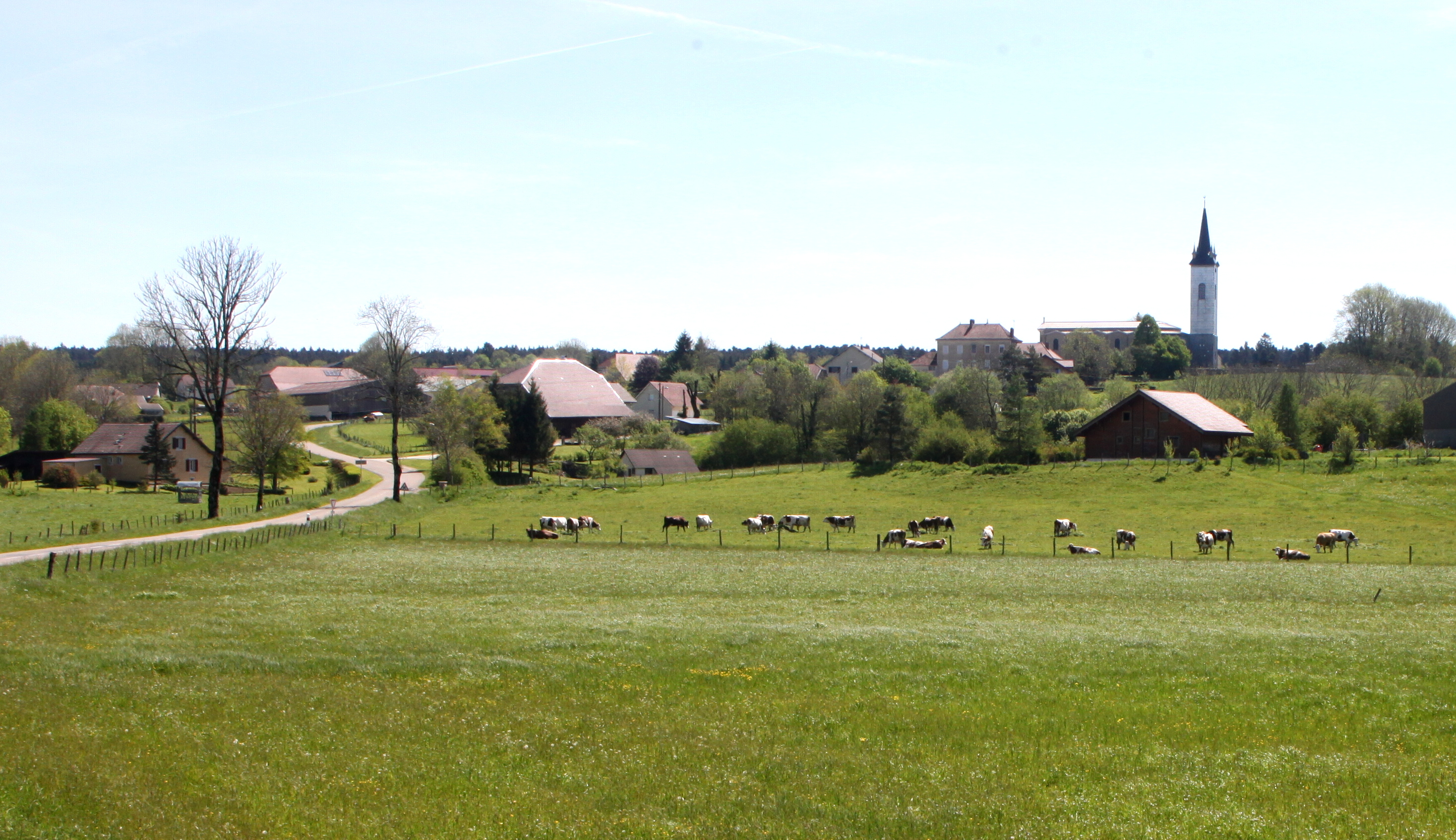
- A general view of Arc-sous-Montenot

- Coat of arms
- Location of Arc-sous-Montenot
- Location within France Location within Bourgogne-Franche-Comté
- Coordinates: 46°54′46″N 6°00′10″E
- Country: France
- Region: Bourgogne-Franche-Comté
- Department: Doubs
- Arrondissement: Pontarlier
- Canton: Frasne
- Intercommunality: Altitude 800

Government
  - Mayor (2020–2026): Patrick Grillon
- Area^{1}: 10.72 km^{2} (4.14 sq mi)
- Highest elevation: 727 m (2,385 ft)
- Lowest elevation: 613 m (2,011 ft)
- Population (2023): 227
  - Density: 21.2/km^{2} (54.8/sq mi)
- Time zone: UTC+01:00 (CET)
  - Summer (DST): UTC+02:00 (CEST)
- INSEE/Postal code: 25026 /25270
- ^{1} French Land Register data, which excludes lakes, ponds, glaciers > 1 km^{2} (0.386 sq mi or 247 acres) and river estuaries.

Arc-sous-Montenot (French pronunciation: [aʁk su mɔ̃tno]; Arpitan: En-A) is a commune in the Doubs department in the Bourgogne-Franche-Comté region in eastern France.

== Population ==
Historical population
Year	Pop.	±% p.a.
1968	249	—
1975	212	−2.27%
1982	232	+1.30%
1990	216	−0.89%
1999	217	+0.05%
2007	222	+0.29%
2012	225	+0.27%
2017	195	−2.82%
2023	227	+2.56%
Source: INSEE

== See also ==
- Communes of the Doubs department
