= Les Villedieu =

- Commune
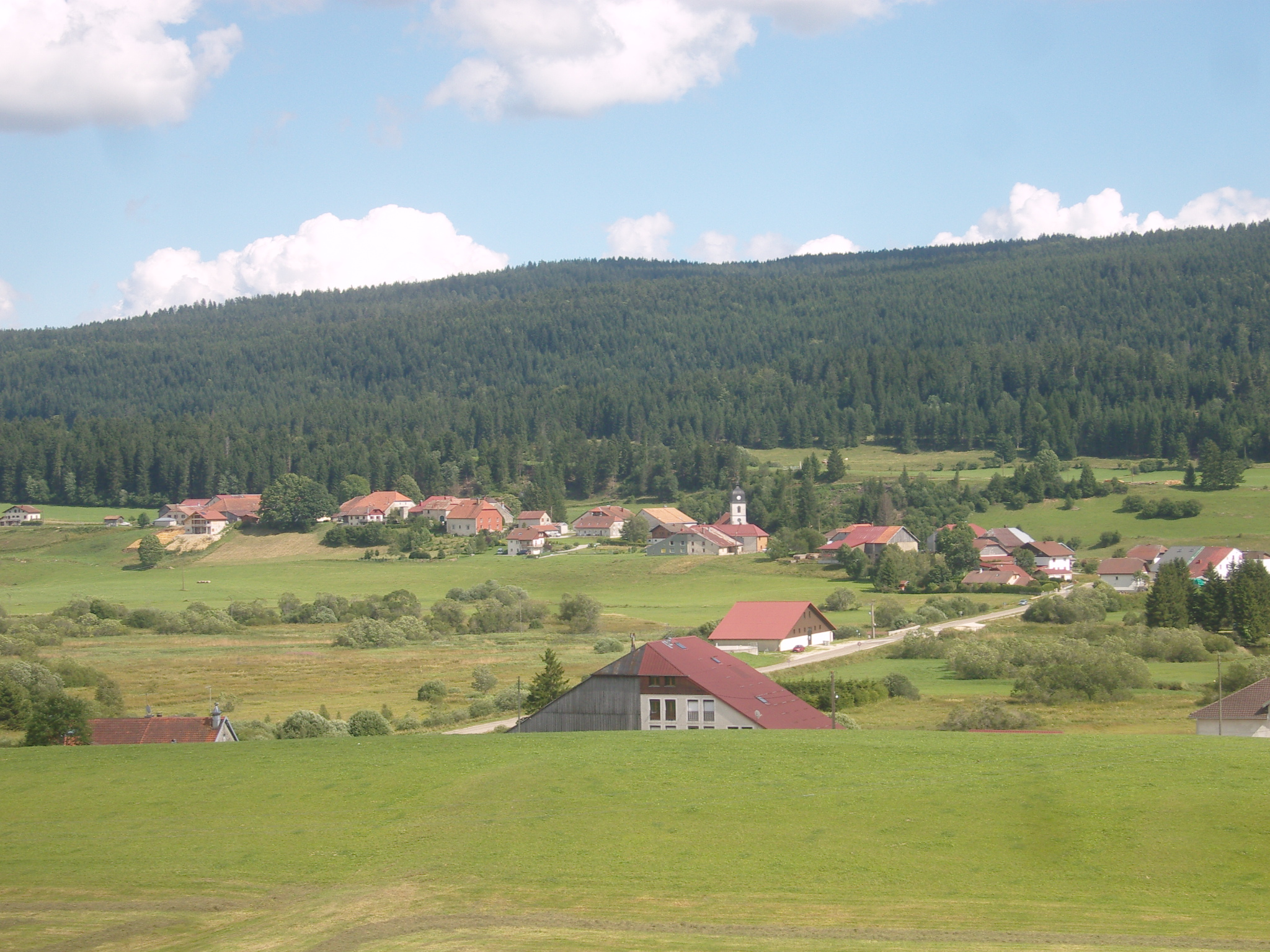
- A general view of Les Villedieu
- Location of Les Villedieu
- Location within France Location within Bourgogne-Franche-Comté
- Coordinates: 46°43′45″N 6°14′52″E
- Country: France
- Region: Bourgogne-Franche-Comté
- Department: Doubs
- Arrondissement: Pontarlier
- Canton: Frasne

Government
  - Mayor (2020–2026): Jean-Marie Saillard
- Area^{1}: 15.07 km^{2} (5.82 sq mi)
- Highest elevation: 1,290 m (4,230 ft)
- Lowest elevation: 907 m (2,976 ft)
- Population (2023): 233
  - Density: 15.5/km^{2} (40.0/sq mi)
- Time zone: UTC+01:00 (CET)
  - Summer (DST): UTC+02:00 (CEST)
- INSEE/Postal code: 25619 /25240
- ^{1} French Land Register data, which excludes lakes, ponds, glaciers > 1 km^{2} (0.386 sq mi or 247 acres) and river estuaries.

Les Villedieu (French pronunciation: [le vildjø]) is a commune in the Doubs department in the Bourgogne-Franche-Comté region in eastern France.

== Population ==
Historical population
Year	Pop.	±% p.a.
1968	136	—
1975	113	−2.61%
1982	109	−0.51%
1990	118	+1.00%
1999	131	+1.17%
2007	154	+2.04%
2012	198	+5.15%
2017	207	+0.89%
2023	233	+1.99%
Source: INSEE

== See also ==
- Communes of the Doubs department
