= Le Crouzet =

- Commune
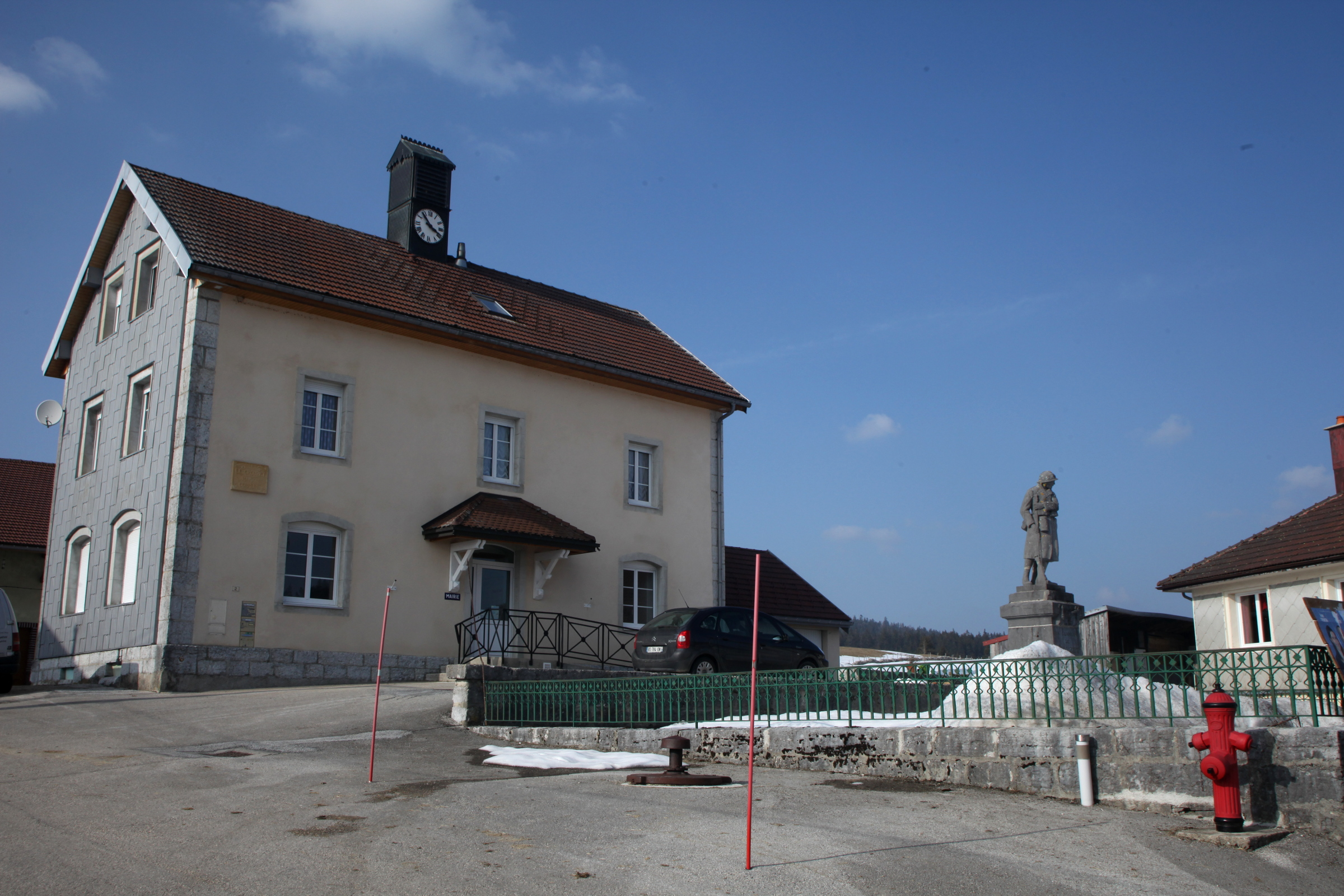
- The town hall in Le Crouzet
- Location of Le Crouzet
- Location within France Location within Bourgogne-Franche-Comté
- Coordinates: 46°42′15″N 6°08′16″E
- Country: France
- Region: Bourgogne-Franche-Comté
- Department: Doubs
- Arrondissement: Pontarlier
- Canton: Frasne

Government
  - Mayor (2020–2026): Jérôme Mairot
- Area^{1}: 3.77 km^{2} (1.46 sq mi)
- Highest elevation: 1,212 m (3,976 ft)
- Lowest elevation: 1,018 m (3,340 ft)
- Population (2023): 51
  - Density: 14/km^{2} (35/sq mi)
- Time zone: UTC+01:00 (CET)
  - Summer (DST): UTC+02:00 (CEST)
- INSEE/Postal code: 25179 /25240
- ^{1} French Land Register data, which excludes lakes, ponds, glaciers > 1 km^{2} (0.386 sq mi or 247 acres) and river estuaries.

Le Crouzet (French pronunciation: [lə kʁuzɛ]) is a commune in the Doubs department in the Bourgogne-Franche-Comté region in eastern France.

== Population ==
Historical population
| Year | Pop. | ±% p.a. |
|---|---|---|
| 1968 | 47 | — |
| 1975 | 40 | −2.28% |
| 1982 | 38 | −0.73% |
| 1990 | 33 | −1.75% |
| 1999 | 40 | +2.16% |
| 2007 | 62 | +5.63% |
| 2012 | 62 | +0.00% |
| 2017 | 59 | −0.99% |
| 2023 | 51 | −2.40% |
Source: INSEE

== See also ==
- Communes of the Doubs department
