= Sarrageois =

- Commune
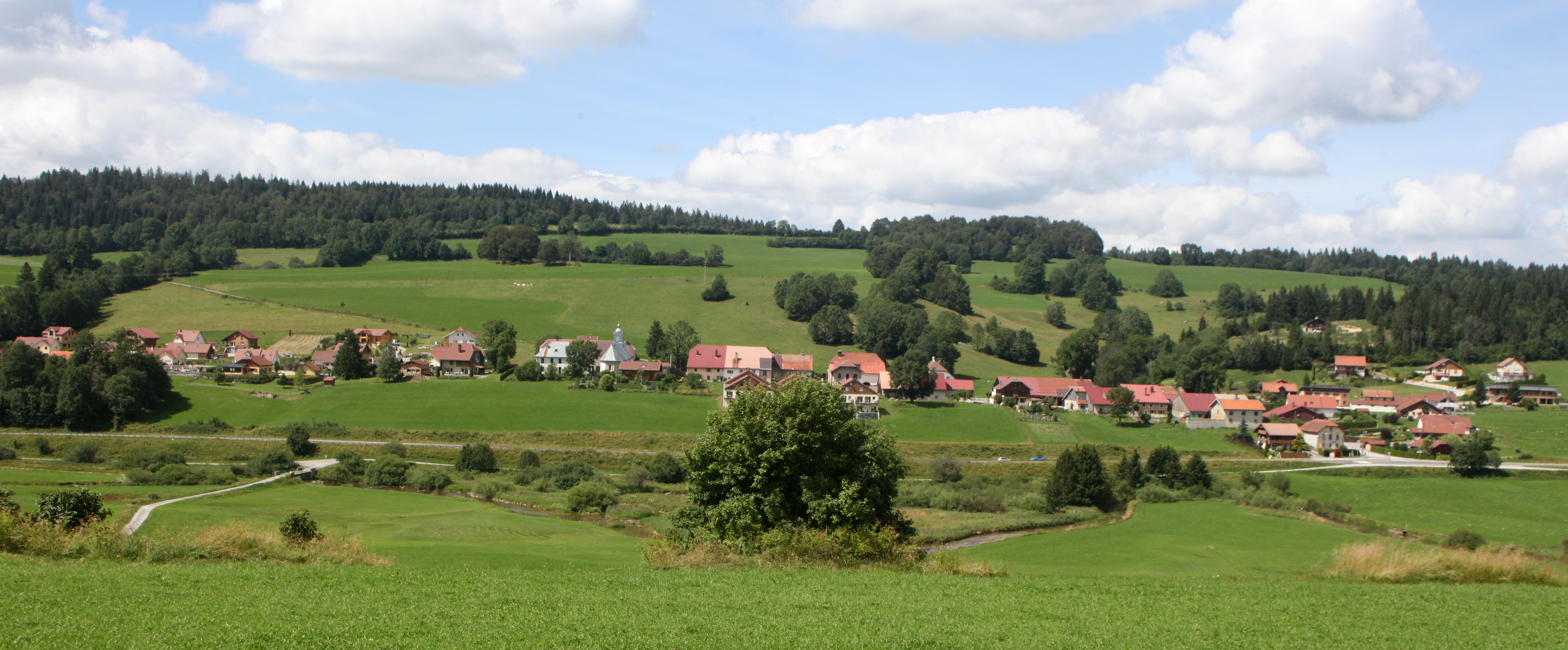
- A general view of Sarrageois

- Coat of arms
- Location of Sarrageois
- Location within France Location within Bourgogne-Franche-Comté
- Coordinates: 46°43′34″N 6°13′01″E
- Country: France
- Region: Bourgogne-Franche-Comté
- Department: Doubs
- Arrondissement: Pontarlier
- Canton: Frasne

Government
  - Mayor (2020–2026): Franck Coquiard
- Area^{1}: 13.22 km^{2} (5.10 sq mi)
- Highest elevation: 1,314 m (4,311 ft)
- Lowest elevation: 920 m (3,020 ft)
- Population (2023): 197
  - Density: 14.9/km^{2} (38.6/sq mi)
- Time zone: UTC+01:00 (CET)
  - Summer (DST): UTC+02:00 (CEST)
- INSEE/Postal code: 25534 /25240
- ^{1} French Land Register data, which excludes lakes, ponds, glaciers > 1 km^{2} (0.386 sq mi or 247 acres) and river estuaries.

Sarrageois (French pronunciation: [saʁaʒwa]) is a commune in the Doubs department in the Bourgogne-Franche-Comté region in eastern France.

== Geography ==
Sarrageois lies 2 km (1.2 mi) northeast of Mouthe.

== Population ==
Historical population
Year	Pop.	±% p.a.
1968	117	—
1975	110	−0.88%
1982	83	−3.94%
1990	78	−0.77%
1999	106	+3.47%
2007	144	+3.90%
2012	168	+3.13%
2017	194	+2.92%
2023	197	+0.26%
Source: INSEE

== See also ==
- Communes of the Doubs department
