= Malpas, Doubs =

Malpas
- Commune
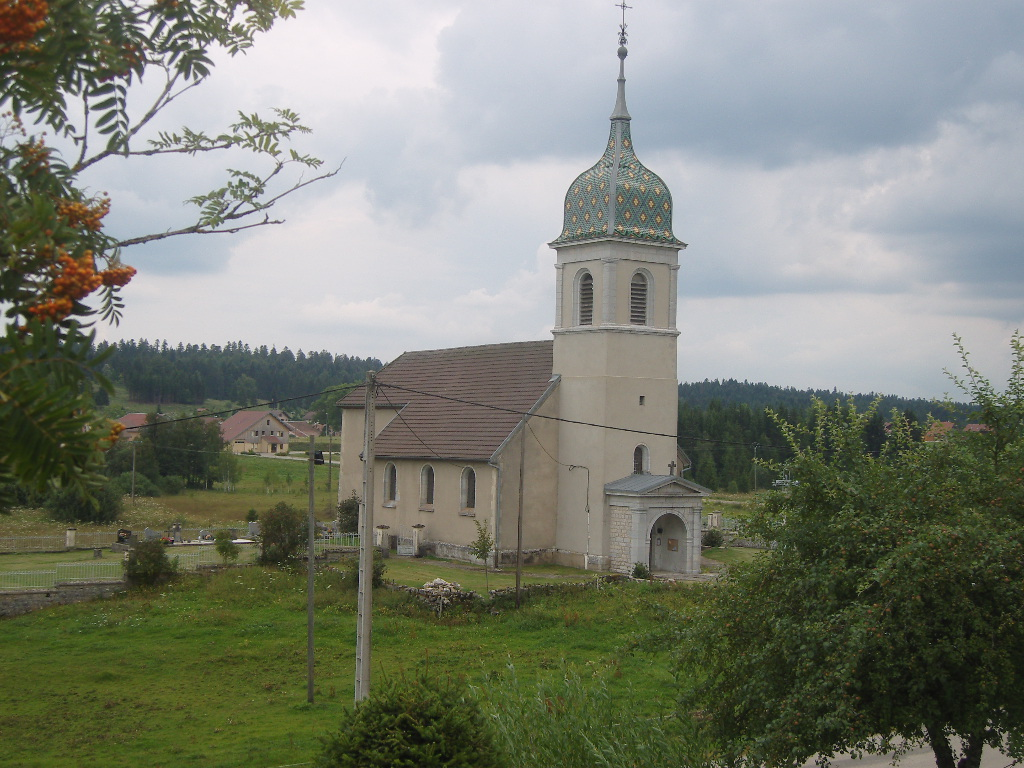
- The church in Malpas

- Coat of arms
- Location of Malpas
- Location within France Location within Bourgogne-Franche-Comté
- Coordinates: 46°49′38″N 6°17′24″E
- Country: France
- Region: Bourgogne-Franche-Comté
- Department: Doubs
- Arrondissement: Pontarlier
- Canton: Frasne

Government
  - Mayor (2020–2026): Jean-Bernard Théry
- Area^{1}: 5.78 km^{2} (2.23 sq mi)
- Highest elevation: 985 m (3,232 ft)
- Lowest elevation: 878 m (2,881 ft)
- Population (2023): 300
  - Density: 52/km^{2} (130/sq mi)
- Time zone: UTC+01:00 (CET)
  - Summer (DST): UTC+02:00 (CEST)
- INSEE/Postal code: 25362 /25160
- ^{1} French Land Register data, which excludes lakes, ponds, glaciers > 1 km^{2} (0.386 sq mi or 247 acres) and river estuaries.

Malpas (French pronunciation: [malpa]) is a commune in the Doubs department in the Bourgogne-Franche-Comté region in eastern France.

== Geography ==
Malpas lies 12 km (7.5 mi) southwest of Pontarlier and 3 km (1.9 mi) from the lake of Saint-Point.

== Population ==
Historical population
Year	Pop.	±% p.a.
1968	89	—
1975	118	+4.11%
1982	136	+2.05%
1990	151	+1.32%
1999	147	−0.30%
2007	190	+3.26%
2012	248	+5.47%
2017	281	+2.53%
2023	300	+1.10%
Source: INSEE

== See also ==
- Communes of the Doubs department
