= Nobody Else but You (film) =

2011 film by Gérald Hustache-Mathieu

- Film poster
- French: Poupoupidou
- Directed by: Gérald Hustache-Mathieu
- Written by: Gérald Hustache-Mathieu
- Produced by: Isabelle Madelaine
- Starring: Jean-Paul Rouve; Sophie Quinton
- Cinematography: Pierre Cottereau
- Edited by: Valérie Deseine
- Music by: Stéphane Lopez
- Production companies: Dharamshala; France 2 Cinéma; Canal+; France Télévision
- Distributed by: Diaphana Films
- Release dates: 12 January 2011 (France); 11 May 2012 (US)
- Running time: 102 minutes
- Country: France
- Language: French
- Budget: €3.27 million
- Box office: $150,173 (US)

Nobody Else but You (French: Poupoupidou) is a 2011 French comedy crime mystery film, written and directed by Gérald Hustache-Mathieu. It stars Jean-Paul Rouve as a bestselling crime novelist who is desperately looking for a new story and hones his focus on the apparent suicide of a small-town woman, a local celebrity, whose life mirrors that of Marilyn Monroe, played by Sophie Quinton.

It was released on 12 January 2011, in France, and on 11 May 2012, in United States. It grossed over $43,000 in the US, and received positive reviews from critics, some of whom compared it favorably to Fargo, Twin Peaks and Laura.

The film's titles (French and English) are references to the song "I Wanna Be Loved by You" sung by Monroe in the film Some Like It Hot.

== Plot ==
Traveling to the village of his aunt to hear the reading of her will, David Rousseau, an author of crime novels, investigates the death of a beautiful young woman named Candice, an apparent suicide in Mouthe. As he investigates Candice's death, the plot of the movie reveals more and more similarities to the life and death of Marilyn Monroe. Rousseau refuses to believe she committed suicide. Teaming up with a local policeman, he seeks to prove that Candice was murdered.

== Cast ==
- Jean-Paul Rouve as David Rousseau
- Sophie Quinton as Candice Lecoeur
- Guillaume Gouix as Bruno Leloup
- Arsinée Khanjian as Juliette Geminy
- Joséphine de Meaux as Cathy
- Olivier Rabourdin as Commandant Colbert
- Éric Ruf as Simon Denner
- Clara Ponsot as Betty
- Finnegan Oldfield as Richi
- Anne Le Ny as the voice of Victoria
- Antoine Michel as Fireman
- Nicolas Duvauchelle as the voice of Fred

== Production ==
The film was shot on 35 mm film stock in Doubs, France, including the church of the village at the center of the story, Mouthe. Additional filming locations in Doubs included the villages of Les Fourgs, Jougne, Malpas, Rochejean and Malbuisson. Filming also took place in March 2010 at the Cité du cinéma in Joinville-le-Pont, located on the grounds of Pathé's former Joinville Studios. Filming then continued in Paris and the Île-de-France region.

== Critical reception ==
On review aggregation website Rotten Tomatoes, the film has an approval rating of 83% based on 30 reviews, and an average rating of 6.7/10. On Metacritic, which assigns a normalized rating to reviews, the film has a score of 63 out of 100 based on 10 critics, indicating "generally favorable reviews".

=== Accolades ===
Year	Award	Category	Result
2011	Chicago International Film Festival	Best International Feature	Nominated
