= Loray =

- Commune
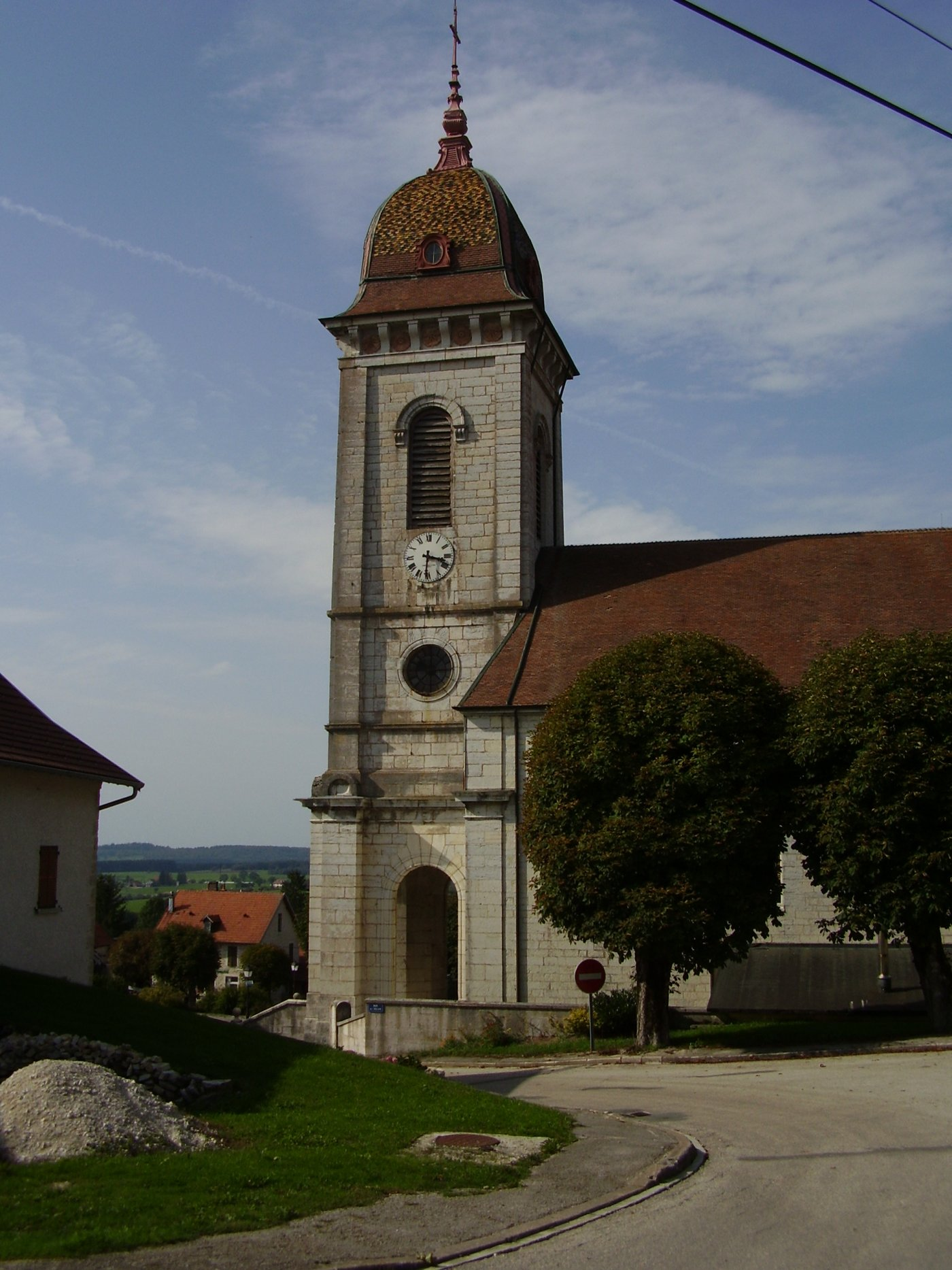
- The church in Loray
- Location of Loray
- Location within France Location within Bourgogne-Franche-Comté
- Coordinates: 47°09′14″N 6°29′47″E
- Country: France
- Region: Bourgogne-Franche-Comté
- Department: Doubs
- Arrondissement: Pontarlier
- Canton: Valdahon

Government
  - Mayor (2020–2026): Claude Roussel
- Area^{1}: 14.39 km^{2} (5.56 sq mi)
- Elevation: 745 m (2,444 ft)
- Highest elevation: 971 m (3,186 ft)
- Lowest elevation: 500 m (1,600 ft)
- Population (2023): 623
  - Density: 43.3/km^{2} (112/sq mi)
- Time zone: UTC+01:00 (CET)
  - Summer (DST): UTC+02:00 (CEST)
- INSEE/Postal code: 25349 /25390
- ^{1} French Land Register data, which excludes lakes, ponds, glaciers > 1 km^{2} (0.386 sq mi or 247 acres) and river estuaries.

Loray (French pronunciation: [lɔʁɛ]) is a commune in the Doubs department in the Bourgogne-Franche-Comté region in eastern France.

== Geography ==
Loray lies 12 km (7.5 mi) south of Pierrefontaine, near Valdahon and Orchamps-Vennes at approximately 50 km (31 mi) east of Besançon on the road between Morteau and Besançon. Its highest point is the Roche-Barchey at 1000 m.

== Population ==
Historical population
Year	Pop.	±% p.a.
1968	356	—
1975	305	−2.18%
1982	365	+2.60%
1990	372	+0.24%
1999	404	+0.92%
2007	450	+1.36%
2012	489	+1.68%
2017	521	+1.28%
2023	623	+3.02%
Source: INSEE

Its inhabitants are called Loraitins (or Cabas) in French.

== Nearby communes ==
The neighbouring communes are La Sommette, Flangebouche, Orchamps-Vennes, Plaimbois-Vennes, and Vennes.

== See also ==
- Communes of the Doubs department
