= Chevigney-lès-Vercel =

- Commune
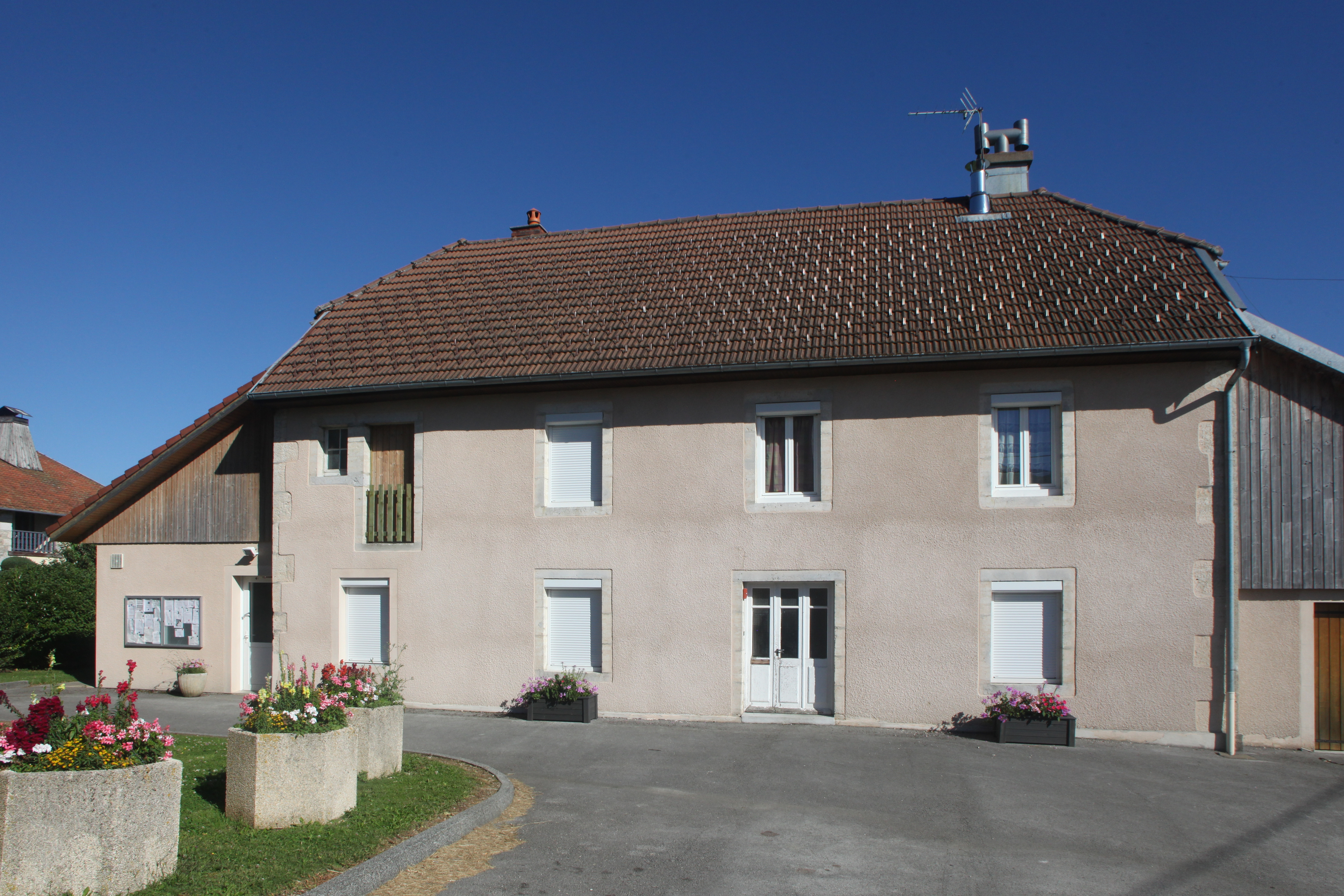
- The town hall in Chevigney-lès-Vercel

- Coat of arms
- Location of Chevigney-lès-Vercel
- Location within France Location within Bourgogne-Franche-Comté
- Coordinates: 47°09′52″N 6°22′20″E
- Country: France
- Region: Bourgogne-Franche-Comté
- Department: Doubs
- Arrondissement: Pontarlier
- Canton: Valdahon

Government
  - Mayor (2020–2026): Marine Punkow
- Area^{1}: 5.38 km^{2} (2.08 sq mi)
- Highest elevation: 700 m (2,300 ft)
- Lowest elevation: 603 m (1,978 ft)
- Population (2023): 141
  - Density: 26.2/km^{2} (67.9/sq mi)
- Time zone: UTC+01:00 (CET)
  - Summer (DST): UTC+02:00 (CEST)
- INSEE/Postal code: 25151 /25530
- ^{1} French Land Register data, which excludes lakes, ponds, glaciers > 1 km^{2} (0.386 sq mi or 247 acres) and river estuaries.

Chevigney-lès-Vercel (French pronunciation: [ʃəviɲɛ lɛ vɛʁsɛl], literally Chevigney near Vercel, before 1991: Chevigney) is a commune in the Doubs department in the Bourgogne-Franche-Comté region in eastern France.

== Population ==
Historical population
Year	Pop.	±% p.a.
1968	52	—
1975	56	+1.06%
1982	82	+5.60%
1990	88	+0.89%
1999	109	+2.41%
2007	126	+1.83%
2012	122	−0.64%
2017	128	+0.96%
2023	141	+1.63%
Source: INSEE

== See also ==
- Communes of the Doubs department
