= Grandfontaine =

Grandfontaine may refer to:

France

- Grandfontaine, Doubs
- Grandfontaine, Bas-Rhin
- Grandfontaine-sur-Creuse, Doubs

Switzerland

- Grandfontaine, Switzerland
