= Longechaux =

- Commune
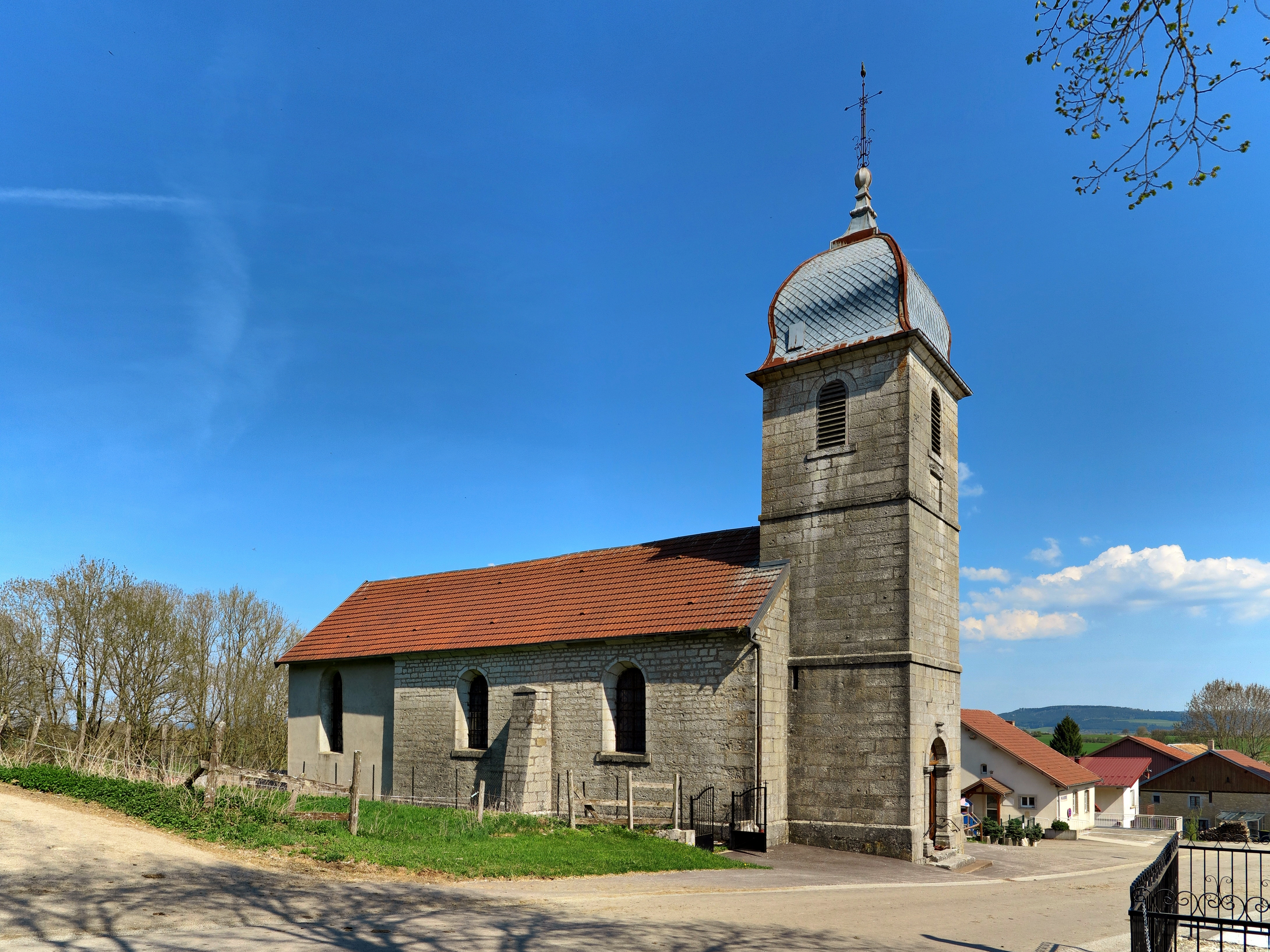
- The church in Longechaux
- Location of Longechaux
- Location within France Location within Bourgogne-Franche-Comté
- Coordinates: 47°09′54″N 6°25′49″E
- Country: France
- Region: Bourgogne-Franche-Comté
- Department: Doubs
- Arrondissement: Pontarlier
- Canton: Valdahon

Government
  - Mayor (2020–2026): Maurice Grosset
- Area^{1}: 5.13 km^{2} (1.98 sq mi)
- Highest elevation: 820 m (2,690 ft)
- Lowest elevation: 699 m (2,293 ft)
- Population (2023): 78
  - Density: 15/km^{2} (39/sq mi)
- Time zone: UTC+01:00 (CET)
  - Summer (DST): UTC+02:00 (CEST)
- INSEE/Postal code: 25342 /25690
- ^{1} French Land Register data, which excludes lakes, ponds, glaciers > 1 km^{2} (0.386 sq mi or 247 acres) and river estuaries.

Longechaux (French pronunciation: [lɔ̃ʒʃo]) is a commune in the Doubs department in the Bourgogne-Franche-Comté region in eastern France.

== Geography ==
The commune is 5 km (3.1 mi) from Vercel on a plateau near a forest.

== Population ==
Historical population
Year	Pop.	±% p.a.
1968	82	—
1975	74	−1.46%
1982	58	−3.42%
1990	51	−1.59%
1999	53	+0.43%
2007	55	+0.46%
2012	70	+4.94%
2017	78	+2.19%
2023	78	+0.00%
Source: INSEE

== Economy ==
Agriculture and the dairy industry remain the principal activities of the village.

== See also ==
- Communes of the Doubs department
