= Vellerot-lès-Vercel =

- Commune
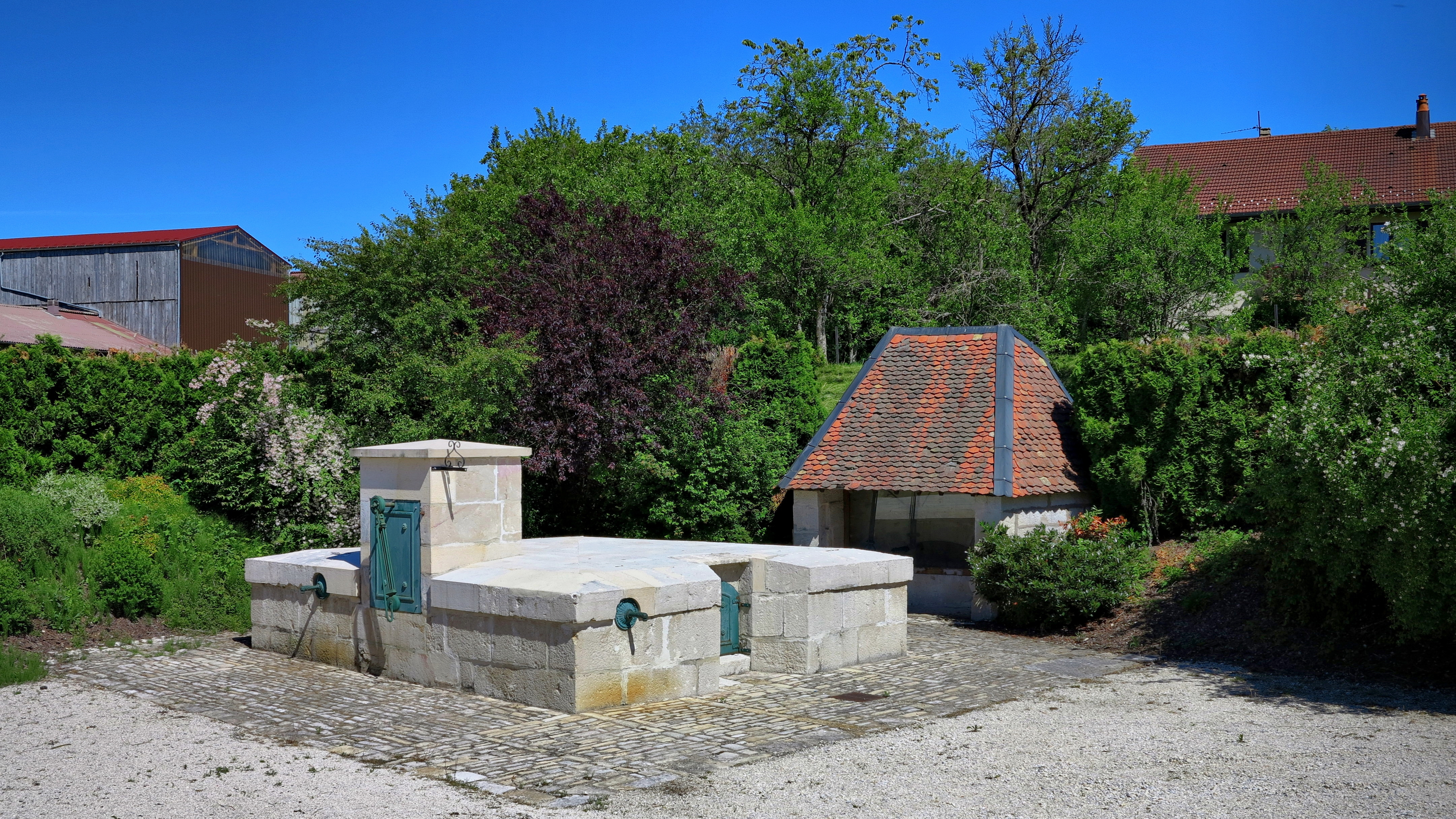
- The fountain in Vellerot-lès-Vercel
- Location of Vellerot-lès-Vercel
- Location within France Location within Bourgogne-Franche-Comté
- Coordinates: 47°14′39″N 6°26′52″E
- Country: France
- Region: Bourgogne-Franche-Comté
- Department: Doubs
- Arrondissement: Pontarlier
- Canton: Valdahon

Government
  - Mayor (2020–2026): Julie Huguenotte
- Area^{1}: 4.57 km^{2} (1.76 sq mi)
- Highest elevation: 703 m (2,306 ft)
- Lowest elevation: 559 m (1,834 ft)
- Population (2023): 65
  - Density: 14/km^{2} (37/sq mi)
- Time zone: UTC+01:00 (CET)
  - Summer (DST): UTC+02:00 (CEST)
- INSEE/Postal code: 25596 /25530
- ^{1} French Land Register data, which excludes lakes, ponds, glaciers > 1 km^{2} (0.386 sq mi or 247 acres) and river estuaries.

Vellerot-lès-Vercel (French pronunciation: [vɛlʁo lɛ vɛʁsɛl], literally Vellerot near Vercel) is a commune in the Doubs department in the Bourgogne-Franche-Comté region in eastern France.

== Population ==
Historical population
Year	Pop.	±% p.a.
1968	90	—
1975	82	−1.32%
1982	62	−3.92%
1990	62	+0.00%
1999	55	−1.32%
2007	45	−2.48%
2012	48	+1.30%
2017	67	+6.90%
2023	65	−0.50%
Source: INSEE

== See also ==
- Communes of the Doubs department
