= Laviron =

- Commune
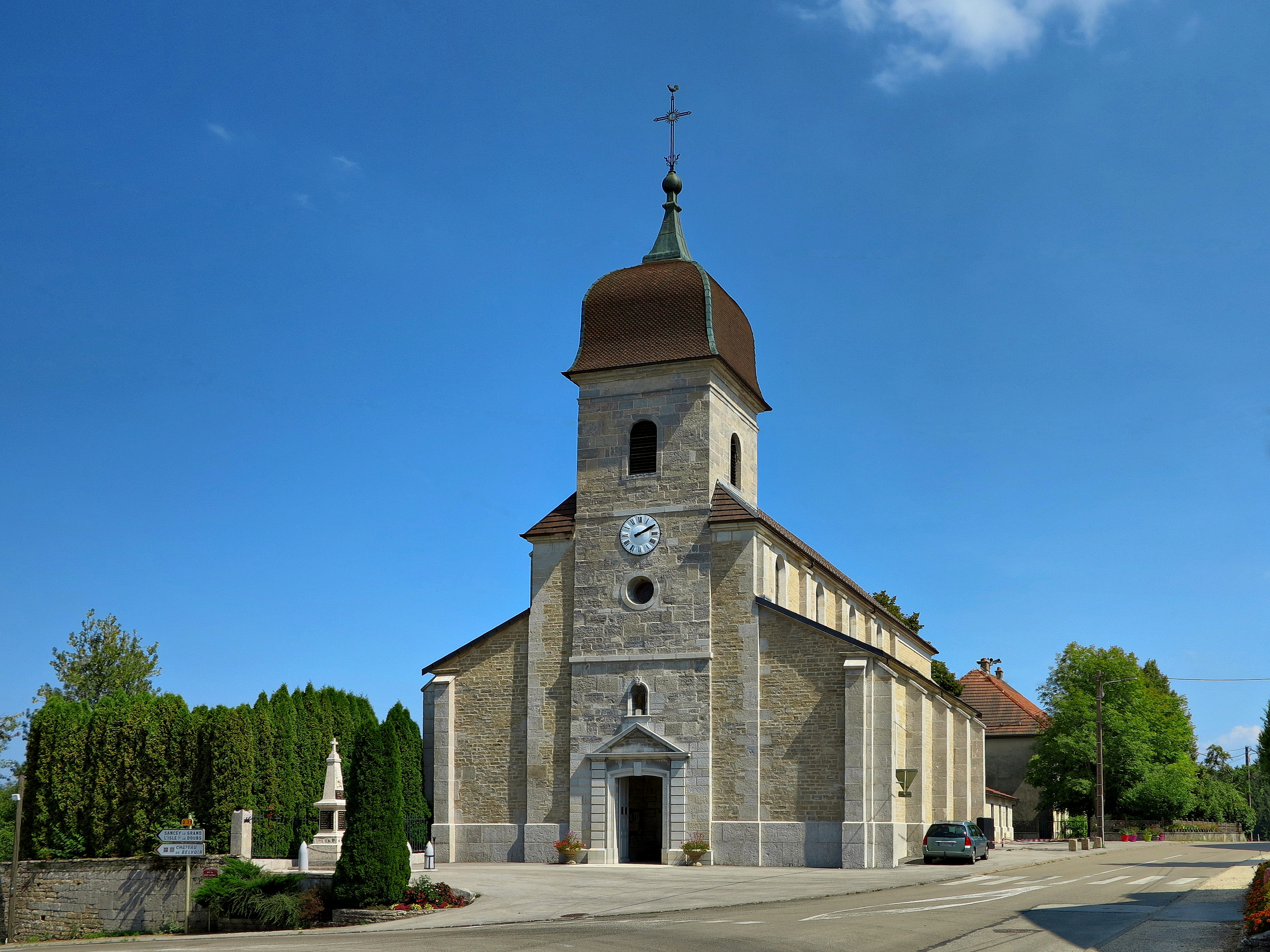
- The church in Laviron

- Coat of arms
- Location of Laviron
- Location within France Location within Bourgogne-Franche-Comté
- Coordinates: 47°15′24″N 6°33′10″E
- Country: France
- Region: Bourgogne-Franche-Comté
- Department: Doubs
- Arrondissement: Pontarlier
- Canton: Valdahon

Government
  - Mayor (2020–2026): Régis Bouchard
- Area^{1}: 19.92 km^{2} (7.69 sq mi)
- Highest elevation: 853 m (2,799 ft)
- Lowest elevation: 658 m (2,159 ft)
- Population (2023): 356
  - Density: 17.9/km^{2} (46.3/sq mi)
- Time zone: UTC+01:00 (CET)
  - Summer (DST): UTC+02:00 (CEST)
- INSEE/Postal code: 25333 /25510
- ^{1} French Land Register data, which excludes lakes, ponds, glaciers > 1 km^{2} (0.386 sq mi or 247 acres) and river estuaries.

Laviron (French pronunciation: [laviʁɔ̃]) is a commune in the Doubs department in the Bourgogne-Franche-Comté region in eastern France.

== Geography ==
The commune is situated 5 km (3.1 mi) from Pierrefontaine-les-Varans.

== Population ==
Historical population
Year	Pop.	±% p.a.
1968	475	—
1975	415	−1.91%
1982	380	−1.25%
1990	347	−1.13%
1999	331	−0.52%
2007	334	+0.11%
2012	355	+1.23%
2017	334	−1.21%
2023	356	+1.07%
Source: INSEE

== See also ==
- Communes of the Doubs department
