= Magny-Châtelard =

- Commune
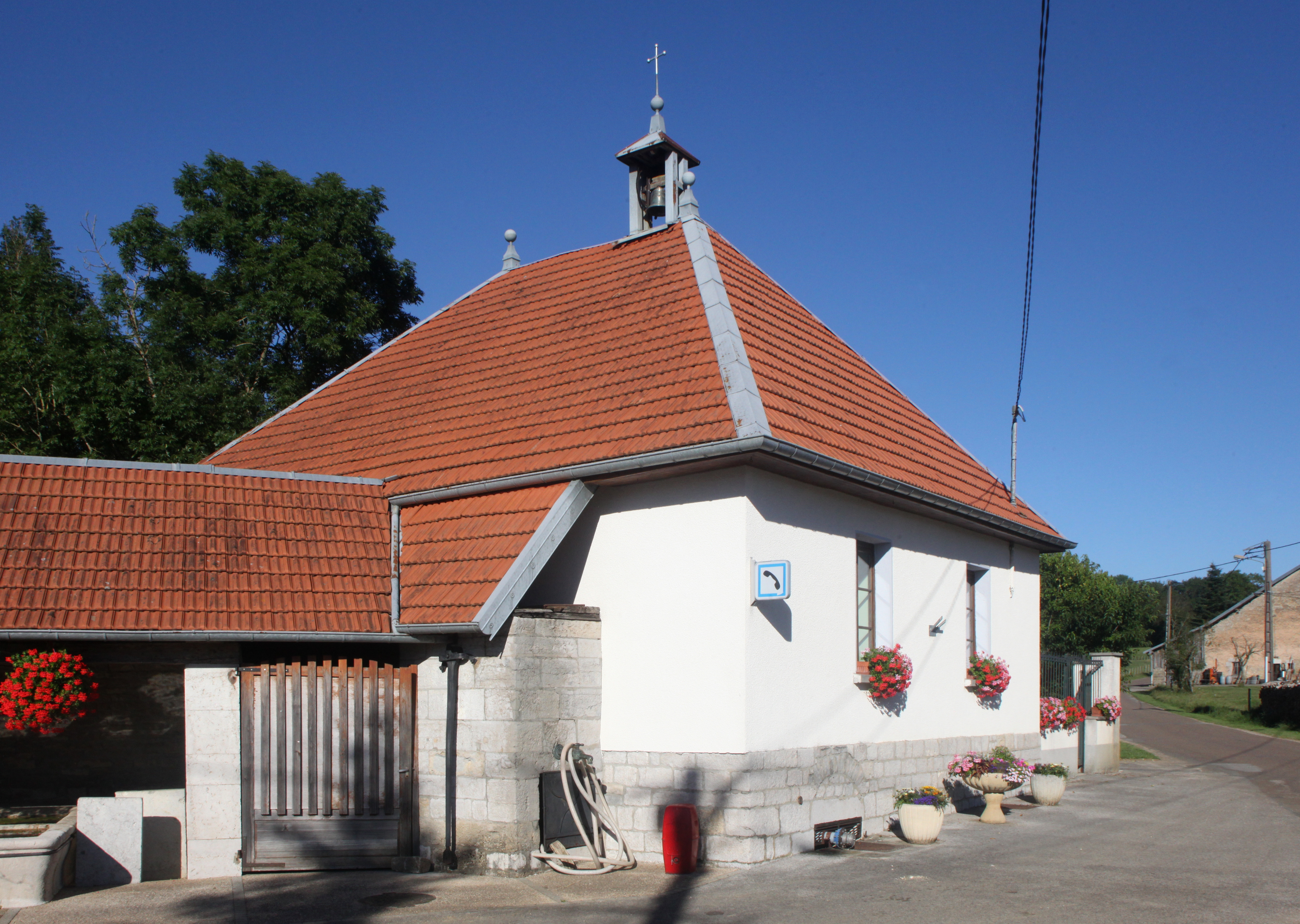
- The town hall in Magny-Châtelard
- Location of Magny-Châtelard
- Location within France Location within Bourgogne-Franche-Comté
- Coordinates: 47°13′40″N 6°19′20″E
- Country: France
- Region: Bourgogne-Franche-Comté
- Department: Doubs
- Arrondissement: Pontarlier
- Canton: Valdahon
- Intercommunality: Portes du Haut-Doubs

Government
  - Mayor (2020–2026): Maxime Gruner
- Area^{1}: 4.2 km^{2} (1.6 sq mi)
- Highest elevation: 610 m (2,000 ft)
- Lowest elevation: 450 m (1,480 ft)
- Population (2023): 60
  - Density: 14/km^{2} (37/sq mi)
- Time zone: UTC+01:00 (CET)
  - Summer (DST): UTC+02:00 (CEST)
- INSEE/Postal code: 25355 /25360
- ^{1} French Land Register data, which excludes lakes, ponds, glaciers > 1 km^{2} (0.386 sq mi or 247 acres) and river estuaries.

Magny-Châtelard (French pronunciation: [maɲi ʃatlaʁ]) is a commune in the Doubs department in the Bourgogne-Franche-Comté region in eastern France.

== Geography ==
The commune lies 12 km (7.5 mi) west of Vercel on the first plateau of the Jura Mountains in a little valley.

== Population ==
Historical population
Year	Pop.	±% p.a.
1968	44	—
1975	31	−4.88%
1982	25	−3.03%
1990	20	−2.75%
1999	19	−0.57%
2007	25	+3.49%
2012	49	+14.41%
2017	61	+4.48%
2023	60	−0.28%
Source: INSEE

== See also ==
- Communes of the Doubs department
