= Villers-Chief =

- Commune
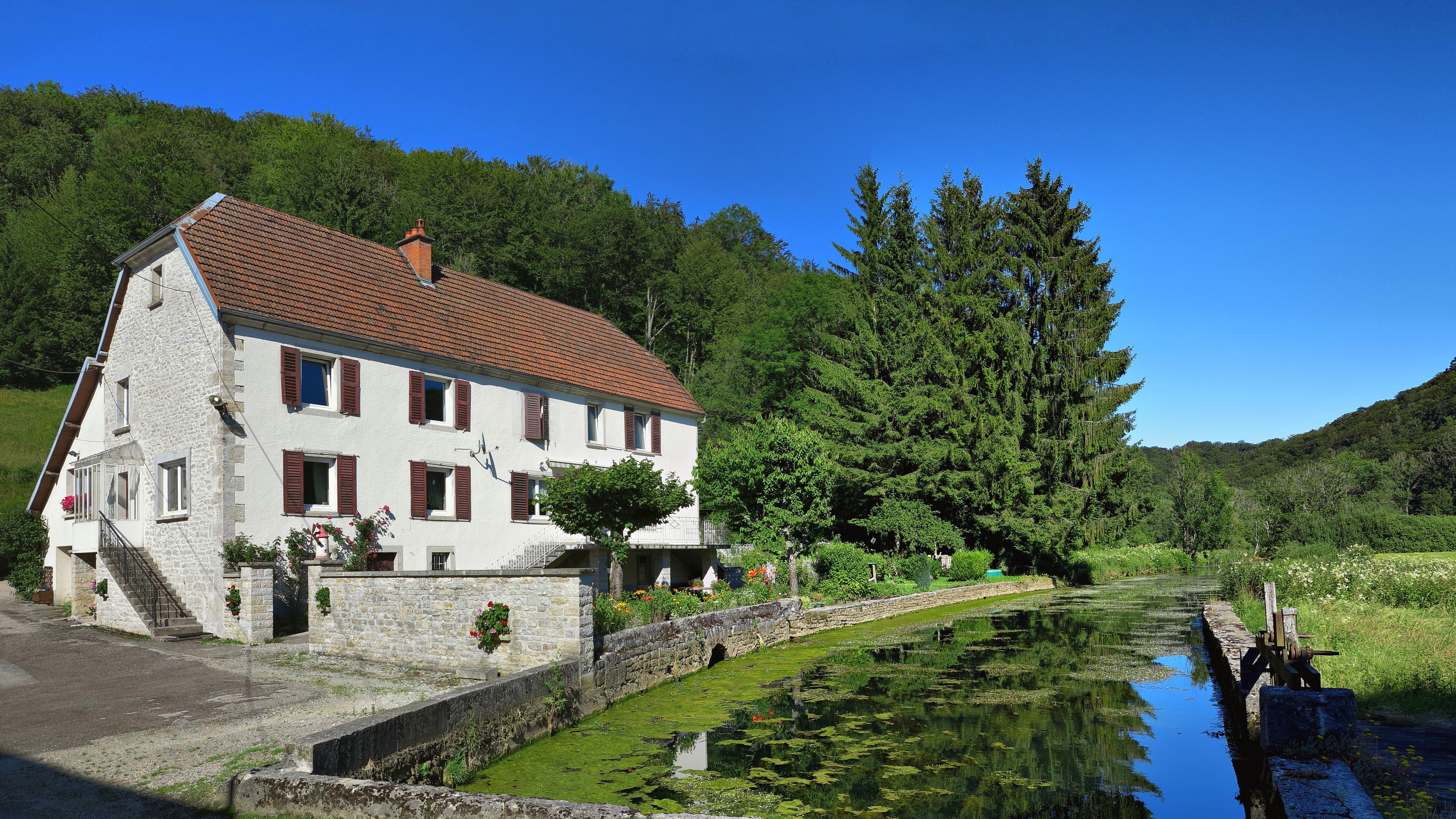
- The Audeux river at the Creuse mill in Villers-Chief
- Location of Villers-Chief
- Location within France Location within Bourgogne-Franche-Comté
- Coordinates: 47°13′38″N 6°26′27″E
- Country: France
- Region: Bourgogne-Franche-Comté
- Department: Doubs
- Arrondissement: Pontarlier
- Canton: Valdahon
- Intercommunality: CC Portes du Haut-Doubs

Government
  - Mayor (2020–2026): Christian Bertin
- Area^{1}: 7.83 km^{2} (3.02 sq mi)
- Highest elevation: 773 m (2,536 ft)
- Lowest elevation: 547 m (1,795 ft)
- Population (2023): 148
  - Density: 18.9/km^{2} (49.0/sq mi)
- Time zone: UTC+01:00 (CET)
  - Summer (DST): UTC+02:00 (CEST)
- INSEE/Postal code: 25623 /25530
- ^{1} French Land Register data, which excludes lakes, ponds, glaciers > 1 km^{2} (0.386 sq mi or 247 acres) and river estuaries.

Villers-Chief (French pronunciation: [vilɛʁ ʃjɛf]) is a commune in the Doubs department in the Bourgogne-Franche-Comté region in eastern France.

== Geography ==
Villers-Chief is situated in the Jura Mountains, in the eastern part of the Doubs department. The commune's territory is characterized by a mix of agricultural land and forested areas, typical of the Franche-Comté region. The Audeux river, a tributary of the Doubs, flows through the commune, notably at the location of the historic Creuse mill. The elevation within the commune ranges from 547 meters (1,795 ft) to 773 meters (2,536 ft) above sea level.

== Administration ==
Villers-Chief is part of the Canton of Valdahon, the Arrondissement of Pontarlier, the Communauté de communes des Portes du Haut-Doubs and the Syndicat Intercommunal à Vocation Unique (SIVU) for education Landresse-Villers-Chief. Since 2020, Christian Bertin has served as the mayor for the term 2020–2026.

== Population history ==
Historical population
Year	Pop.	±% p.a.
1968	141	—
1975	129	−1.26%
1982	112	−2.00%
1990	109	−0.34%
1999	119	+0.98%
2007	116	−0.32%
2012	109	−1.24%
2017	123	+2.45%
2023	148	+3.13%
Source: INSEE

== See also ==
- Communes of the Doubs department
