= Adam-lès-Vercel =

- Commune
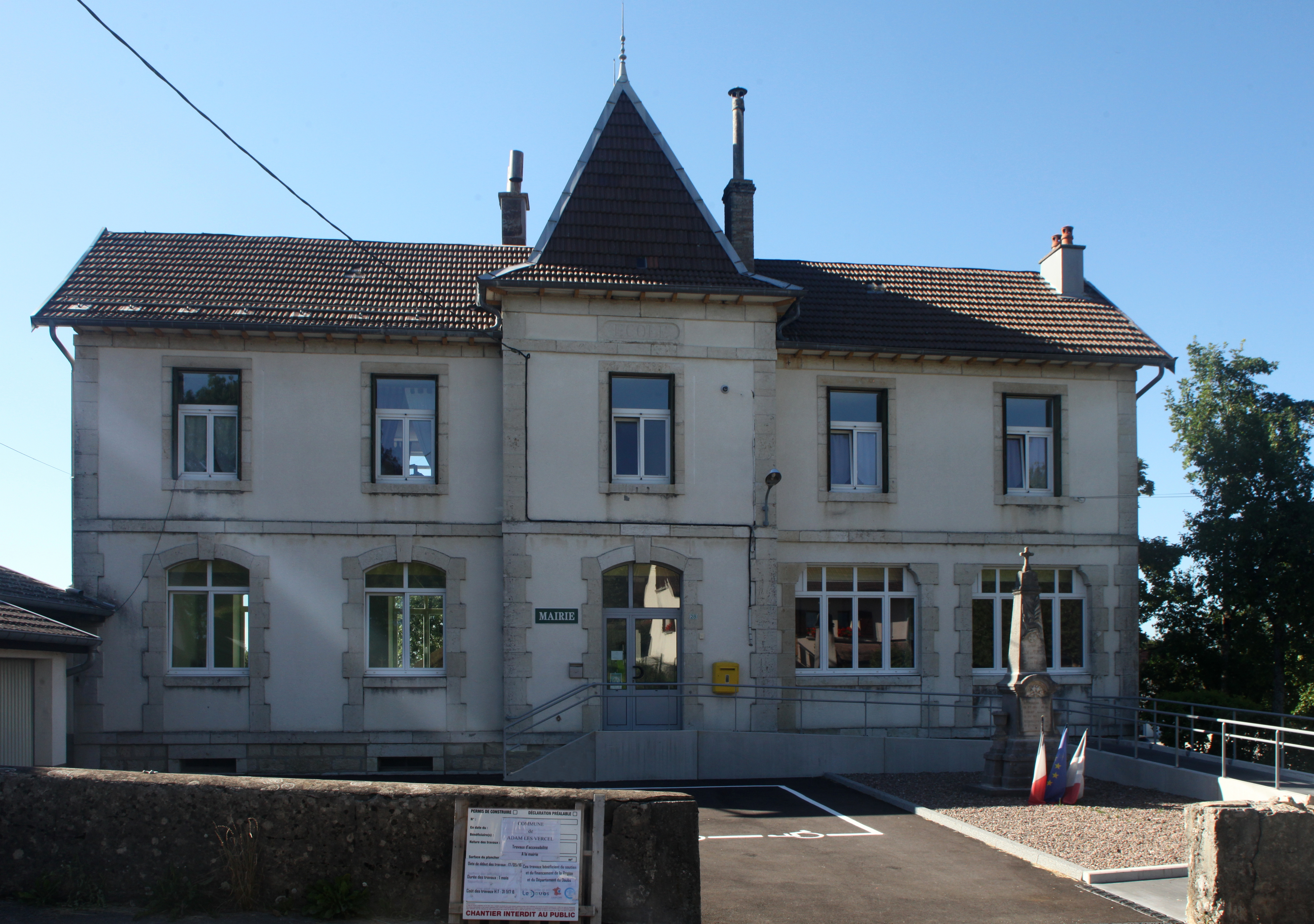
- The town hall in Adam-lès-Vercel
- Location of Adam-lès-Vercel
- Location within France Location within Bourgogne-Franche-Comté
- Coordinates: 47°10′08″N 6°23′32″E
- Country: France
- Region: Bourgogne-Franche-Comté
- Department: Doubs
- Arrondissement: Pontarlier
- Canton: Valdahon
- Intercommunality: Portes du Haut-Doubs

Government
  - Mayor (2020–2026): Laurent Brion
- Area^{1}: 3.19 km^{2} (1.23 sq mi)
- Highest elevation: 821 m (2,694 ft)
- Lowest elevation: 634 m (2,080 ft)
- Population (2023): 105
  - Density: 32.9/km^{2} (85.3/sq mi)
- Time zone: UTC+01:00 (CET)
  - Summer (DST): UTC+02:00 (CEST)
- INSEE/Postal code: 25007 /25530
- ^{1} French Land Register data, which excludes lakes, ponds, glaciers > 1 km^{2} (0.386 sq mi or 247 acres) and river estuaries.

Adam-lès-Vercel (French pronunciation: [adɑ̃ lɛ vɛʁsɛl], literally Adam near Vercel) is a commune in the Doubs department in the Bourgogne-Franche-Comté region in eastern France.

== Population ==
Historical population
Year	Pop.	±% p.a.
1968	62	—
1975	47	−3.88%
1982	53	+1.73%
1990	65	+2.58%
1999	67	+0.34%
2007	90	+3.76%
2012	109	+3.91%
2017	103	−1.13%
2023	105	+0.32%
Source: INSEE

== See also ==
- Communes of the Doubs department
