= Arrondissement of Pontarlier =

Coordinates: 46.90°N 6.37°E

Pontarlier
- Arrondissement
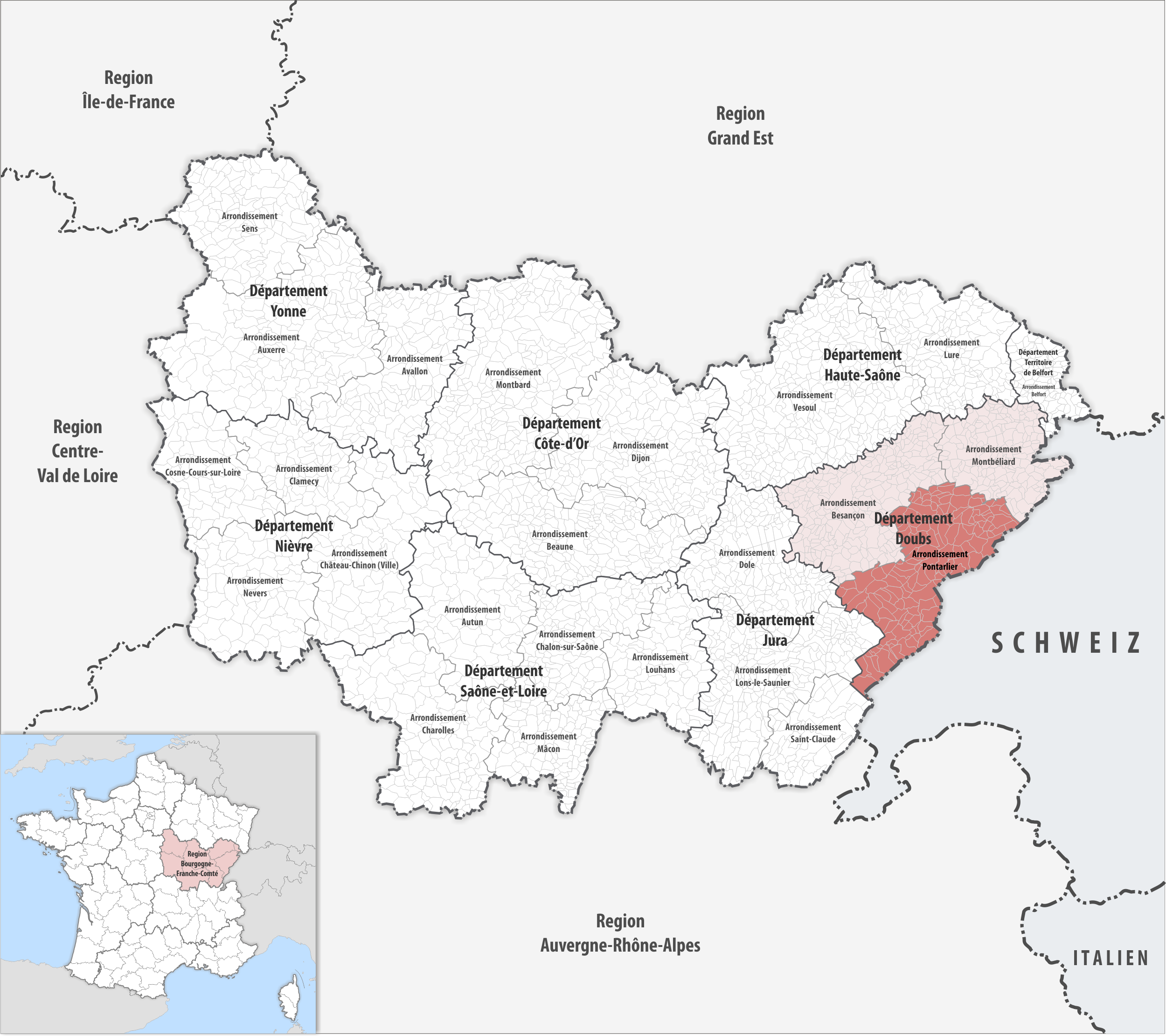
- Location within the region Bourgogne-Franche-Comté
- Country: France
- Region: Bourgogne-Franche-Comté
- Department: Doubs
- No. of communes: {{{nbcomm}}}
- Area: 2,050.5 km^{2} (791.7 sq mi)
- Population (2023): 119,947
  - Density: 58.496/km^{2} (151.51/sq mi)
- INSEE code: 253

The arrondissement of Pontarlier is an arrondissement of France in the Doubs department in the Bourgogne-Franche-Comté region. It has 143 communes. Its population is 118,081 (2021), and its area is 2,050.5 km^{2} (791.7 sq mi).

== Composition ==
=== Cantons ===
The cantons of the arrondissement of Pontarlier are:

- Frasne
- Morteau
- Ornans (partly)
- Pontarlier
- Valdahon (partly)

=== Communes ===
The communes of the arrondissement of Pontarlier, and their INSEE codes, are:

1. Adam-lès-Vercel (25007)
2. Les Alliés (25012)
3. Arçon (25024)
4. Arc-sous-Cicon (25025)
5. Arc-sous-Montenot (25026)
6. Aubonne (25029)
7. Avoudrey (25039)
8. Bannans (25041)
9. Le Barboux (25042)
10. Le Bélieu (25050)
11. Belmont (25052)
12. Le Bizot (25062)
13. Bonnétage (25074)
14. Bonnevaux (25075)
15. La Bosse (25077)
16. Boujailles (25079)
17. Bouverans (25085)
18. Bremondans (25089)
19. Bretonvillers (25095)
20. Brey-et-Maison-du-Bois (25096)
21. Bugny (25099)
22. Bulle (25100)
23. Chaffois (25110)
24. Chamesey (25113)
25. Chapelle-des-Bois (25121)
26. Chapelle-d'Huin (25122)
27. Châtelblanc (25131)
28. La Chaux (25139)
29. Chaux-lès-Passavant (25141)
30. Chaux-Neuve (25142)
31. La Chenalotte (25148)
32. Chevigney-lès-Vercel (25151)
33. La Cluse-et-Mijoux (25157)
34. Les Combes (25160)
35. Consolation-Maisonnettes (25161)
36. Courtetain-et-Salans (25175)
37. Courvières (25176)
38. Le Crouzet (25179)
39. Dommartin (25201)
40. Dompierre-les-Tilleuls (25202)
41. Domprel (25203)
42. Doubs (25204)
43. Épenouse (25218)
44. Épenoy (25219)
45. Étalans (25222)
46. Étray (25227)
47. Évillers (25229)
48. Eysson (25231)
49. Fallerans (25233)
50. Les Fins (25240)
51. Flangebouche (25243)
52. Les Fontenelles (25248)
53. Fourcatier-et-Maison-Neuve (25252)
54. Les Fourgs (25254)
55. Fournets-Luisans (25288)
56. Frasne (25259)
57. Fuans (25262)
58. Gellin (25263)
59. Germéfontaine (25268)
60. Gilley (25271)
61. Grand'Combe-Châteleu (25285)
62. Grand'Combe-des-Bois (25286)
63. Grandfontaine-sur-Creuse (25289)
64. Granges-Narboz (25293)
65. Les Grangettes (25295)
66. Les Gras (25296)
67. Guyans-Vennes (25301)
68. Les Hôpitaux-Neufs (25307)
69. Les Hôpitaux-Vieux (25308)
70. Houtaud (25309)
71. Jougne (25318)
72. Labergement-Sainte-Marie (25320)
73. Landresse (25325)
74. Laval-le-Prieuré (25329)
75. Laviron (25333)
76. Levier (25334)
77. Longechaux (25342)
78. Longemaison (25343)
79. Longevelle-lès-Russey (25344)
80. Longevilles-Mont-d'Or (25348)
81. Loray (25349)
82. Le Luhier (25351)
83. Magny-Châtelard (25355)
84. Maisons-du-Bois-Lièvremont (25357)
85. Malbuisson (25361)
86. Malpas (25362)
87. Le Mémont (25373)
88. Métabief (25380)
89. Montbéliardot (25389)
90. Mont-de-Laval (25391)
91. Montlebon (25403)
92. Montperreux (25405)
93. Morteau (25411)
94. Mouthe (25413)
95. Narbief (25421)
96. Noël-Cerneux (25425)
97. Orchamps-Vennes (25432)
98. Orsans (25435)
99. Ouhans (25440)
100. Ouvans (25441)
101. Oye-et-Pallet (25442)
102. Passonfontaine (25447)
103. Pays-de-Montbenoît (25390)
104. Petite-Chaux (25451)
105. Pierrefontaine-les-Varans (25453)
106. Plaimbois-du-Miroir (25456)
107. Plaimbois-Vennes (25457)
108. La Planée (25459)
109. Pontarlier (25462)
110. Les Pontets (25464)
111. Les Premiers-Sapins (25424)
112. Reculfoz (25483)
113. Remoray-Boujeons (25486)
114. Renédale (25487)
115. La Rivière-Drugeon (25493)
116. Rochejean (25494)
117. Rondefontaine (25501)
118. Rosureux (25504)
119. Le Russey (25512)
120. Saint-Antoine (25514)
121. Sainte-Colombe (25515)
122. Saint-Gorgon-Main (25517)
123. Saint-Julien-lès-Russey (25522)
124. Saint-Point-Lac (25525)
125. Sarrageois (25534)
126. Septfontaines (25541)
127. La Sommette (25550)
128. Touillon-et-Loutelet (25565)
129. Valdahon (25578)
130. Val-d'Usiers (25060)
131. Vaux-et-Chantegrue (25592)
132. Vellerot-lès-Vercel (25596)
133. Vennes (25600)
134. Vercel-Villedieu-le-Camp (25601)
135. Vernierfontaine (25605)
136. Verrières-de-Joux (25609)
137. Les Villedieu (25619)
138. Villeneuve-d'Amont (25621)
139. Villers-Chief (25623)
140. Villers-la-Combe (25625)
141. Villers-le-Lac (25321)
142. Villers-sous-Chalamont (25627)
143. Vuillecin (25634)

== History ==
The arrondissement of Pontarlier was created in 1800. It was expanded in 2009 with the two cantons of Pierrefontaine-les-Varans and Vercel-Villedieu-le-Camp from the arrondissement of Besançon, and the canton of Le Russey from the arrondissement of Montbéliard.

As a result of the reorganisation of the cantons of France which came into effect in 2015, the borders of the cantons are no longer related to the borders of the arrondissements. The cantons of the arrondissement of Pontarlier were, as of January 2015:

1. Levier
2. Montbenoît
3. Morteau
4. Mouthe
5. Pierrefontaine-les-Varans
6. Pontarlier
7. Le Russey
8. Vercel-Villedieu-le-Camp
