= Gilley, Doubs =

Gilley
- Commune
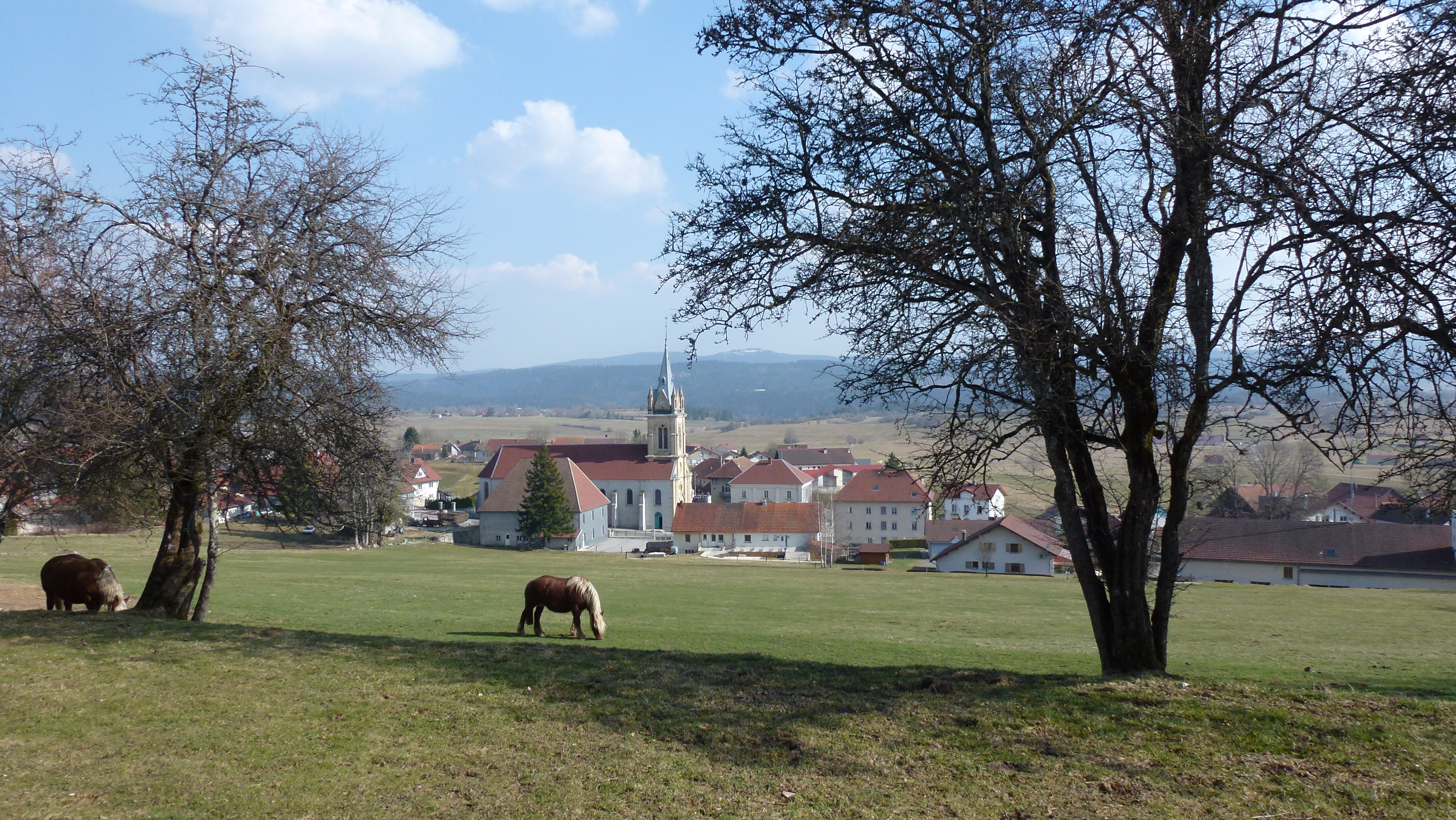
- A general view of Gilley

- Coat of arms
- Location of Gilley
- Location within France Location within Bourgogne-Franche-Comté
- Coordinates: 47°02′54″N 6°29′07″E
- Country: France
- Region: Bourgogne-Franche-Comté
- Department: Doubs
- Arrondissement: Pontarlier
- Canton: Ornans
- Intercommunality: CC entre Doubs et Loue

Government
  - Mayor (2020–2026): Gilbert Marguet
- Area^{1}: 17.27 km^{2} (6.67 sq mi)
- Highest elevation: 1,083 m (3,553 ft)
- Lowest elevation: 820 m (2,690 ft)
- Population (2023): 1,842
  - Density: 106.7/km^{2} (276.2/sq mi)
- Time zone: UTC+01:00 (CET)
  - Summer (DST): UTC+02:00 (CEST)
- INSEE/Postal code: 25271 /25650
- ^{1} French Land Register data, which excludes lakes, ponds, glaciers > 1 km^{2} (0.386 sq mi or 247 acres) and river estuaries.

Gilley (French pronunciation: [ʒijɛ]; Arpitan: Dziyii) is a commune in the Doubs department in the region of Bourgogne-Franche-Comté in eastern France.

== Population ==
Historical population
Year	Pop.	±% p.a.
1968	942	—
1975	978	+0.54%
1982	1,040	+0.88%
1990	1,149	+1.25%
1999	1,253	+0.97%
2007	1,395	+1.35%
2012	1,563	+2.30%
2017	1,656	+1.16%
2023	1,842	+1.79%
Source: INSEE

== See also ==
- Communes of the Doubs department
