= Arçon =

- Commune
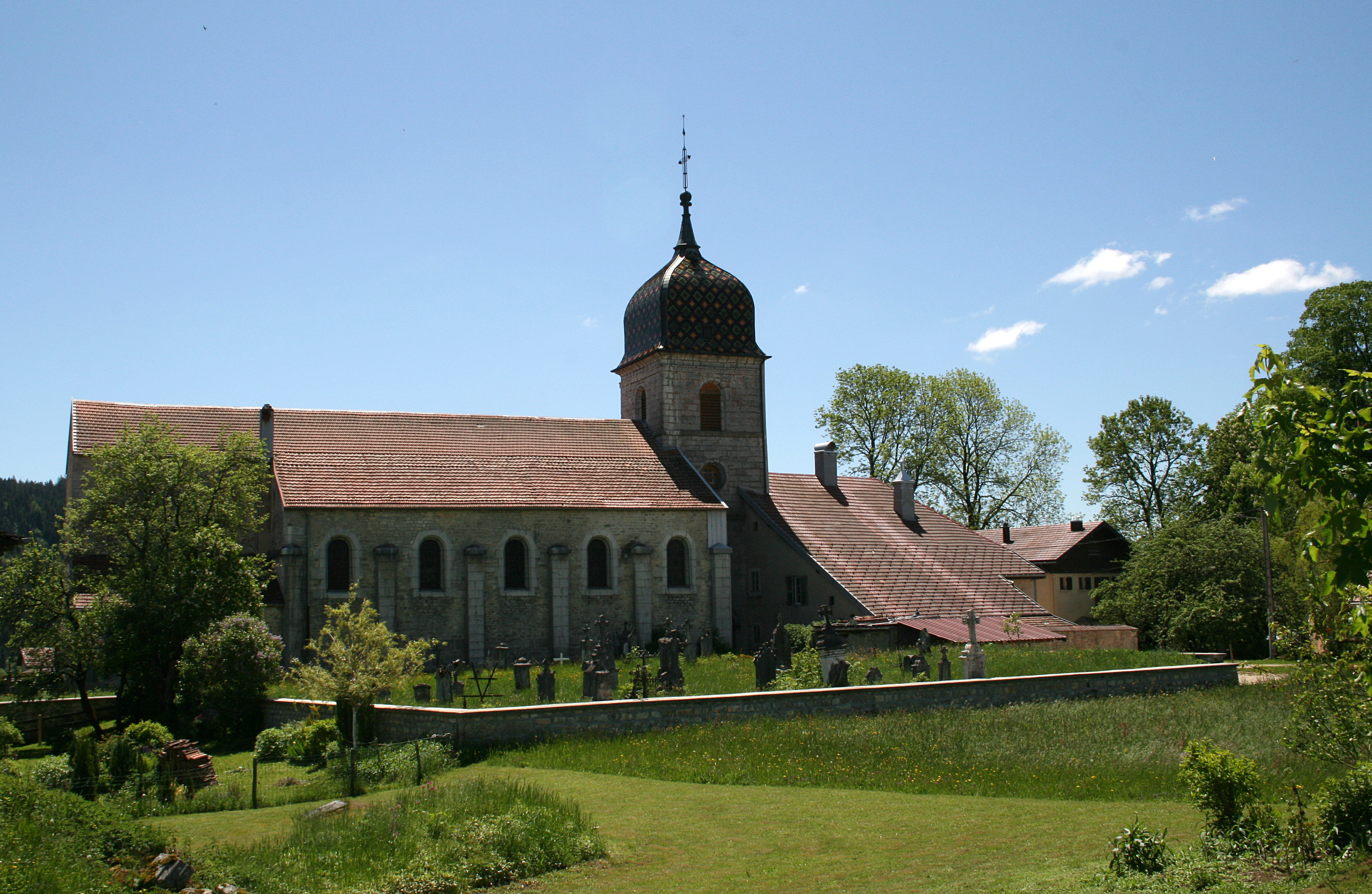
- The church in Arçon
- Location of Arçon
- Location within France Location within Bourgogne-Franche-Comté
- Coordinates: 46°56′53″N 6°22′47″E
- Country: France
- Region: Bourgogne-Franche-Comté
- Department: Doubs
- Arrondissement: Pontarlier
- Canton: Ornans
- Intercommunality: CC entre Doubs et Loue

Government
  - Mayor (2021–2026): Fabien Henriet
- Area^{1}: 21.34 km^{2} (8.24 sq mi)
- Highest elevation: 1,086 m (3,563 ft)
- Lowest elevation: 787 m (2,582 ft)
- Population (2023): 961
  - Density: 45.0/km^{2} (117/sq mi)
- Time zone: UTC+01:00 (CET)
  - Summer (DST): UTC+02:00 (CEST)
- INSEE/Postal code: 25024 /25300
- ^{1} French Land Register data, which excludes lakes, ponds, glaciers > 1 km^{2} (0.386 sq mi or 247 acres) and river estuaries.

Arçon (French pronunciation: [aʁsɔ̃]; Arpitan: Aechon) is a commune in the Doubs department in the Bourgogne-Franche-Comté region in eastern France.

== Population ==
Historical population
Year	Pop.	±% p.a.
1968	513	—
1975	571	+1.54%
1982	650	+1.87%
1990	665	+0.29%
1999	695	+0.49%
2007	762	+1.16%
2012	786	+0.62%
2017	841	+1.36%
2023	961	+2.25%
Source: INSEE

== See also ==
- Communes of the Doubs department
