= Longemaison =

- Commune
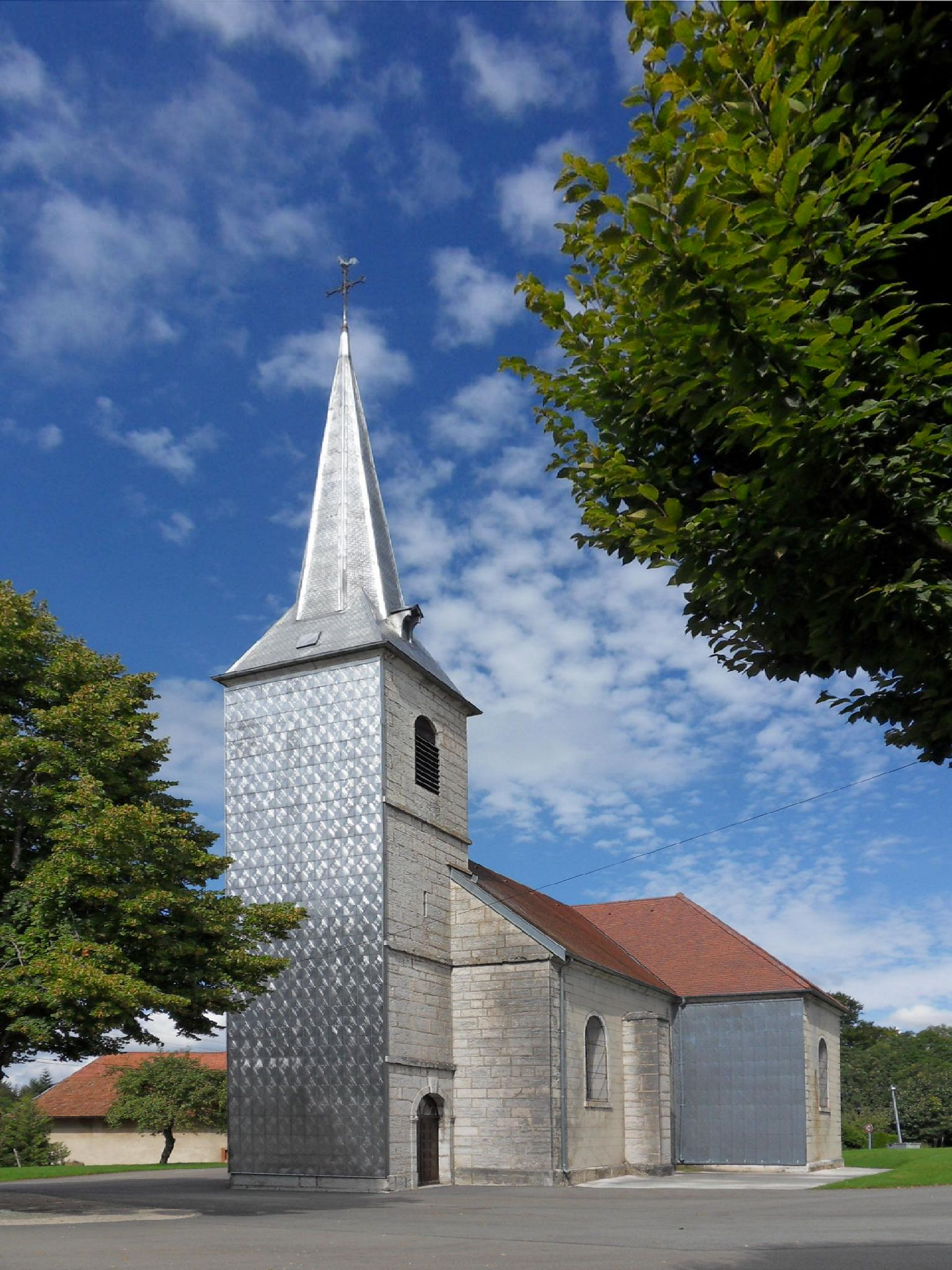
- The church in Longemaison
- Location of Longemaison
- Location within France Location within Bourgogne-Franche-Comté
- Coordinates: 47°04′56″N 6°27′36″E
- Country: France
- Region: Bourgogne-Franche-Comté
- Department: Doubs
- Arrondissement: Pontarlier
- Canton: Valdahon

Government
  - Mayor (2020–2026): Claude Brisebard
- Area^{1}: 9.63 km^{2} (3.72 sq mi)
- Highest elevation: 1,091 m (3,579 ft)
- Lowest elevation: 730 m (2,400 ft)
- Population (2023): 167
  - Density: 17.3/km^{2} (44.9/sq mi)
- Time zone: UTC+01:00 (CET)
  - Summer (DST): UTC+02:00 (CEST)
- INSEE/Postal code: 25343 /25690
- ^{1} French Land Register data, which excludes lakes, ponds, glaciers > 1 km^{2} (0.386 sq mi or 247 acres) and river estuaries.

Longemaison (French pronunciation: [lɔ̃ʒmɛzɔ̃]) is a commune in the Doubs département in the Bourgogne-Franche-Comté region in eastern France.

== Geography ==
The village likes on the wooded slopes of the Mont Chaumont, which is the highest point of the commune at 1092 meters.

== Population ==
Historical population
Year	Pop.	±% p.a.
1968	191	—
1975	140	−4.34%
1982	116	−2.65%
1990	112	−0.44%
1999	121	+0.86%
2007	129	+0.80%
2012	136	+1.06%
2017	154	+2.52%
2023	167	+1.36%
Source: INSEE

== See also ==
- Communes of the Doubs department
