= Les Grangettes =

- Commune
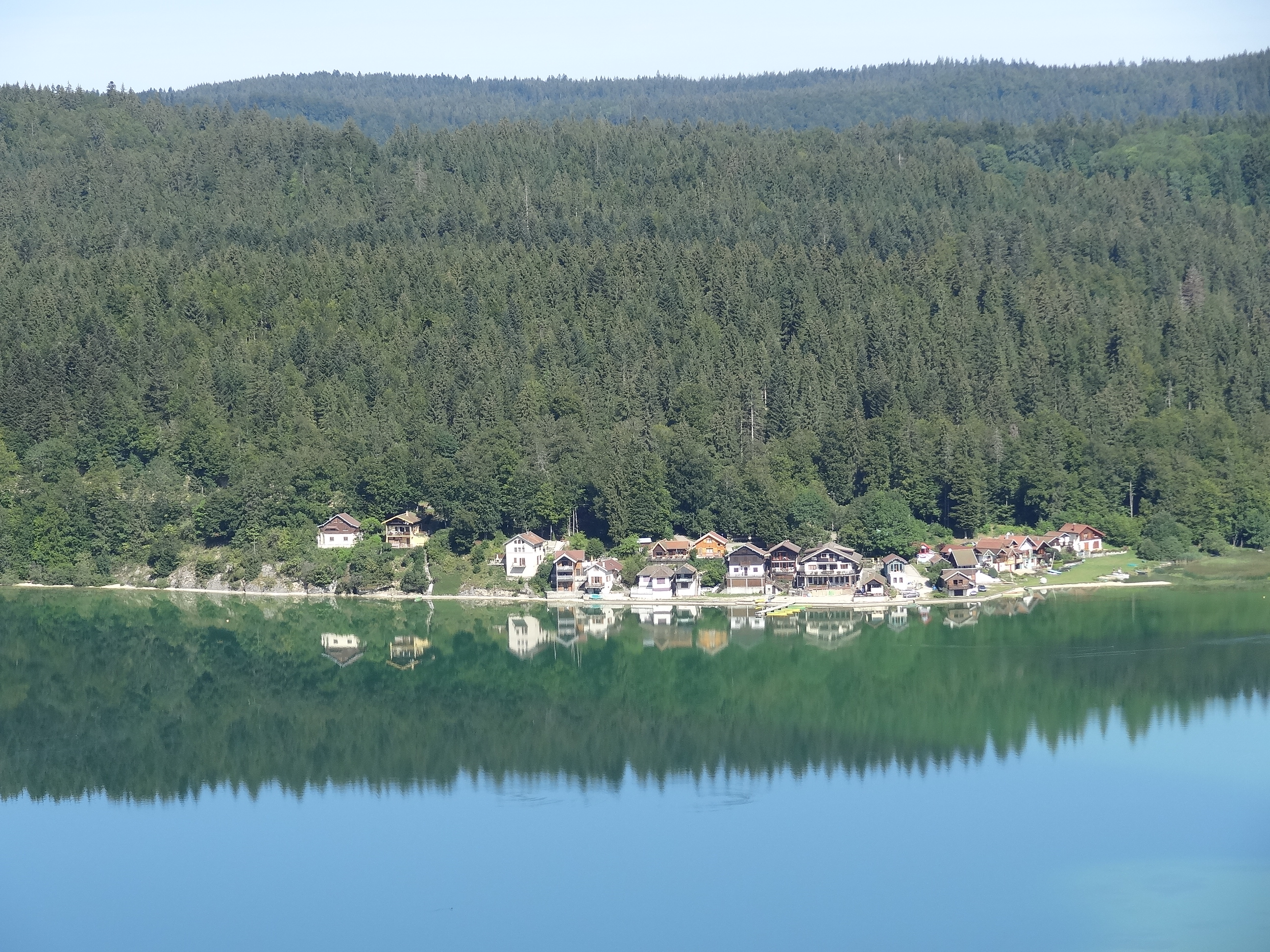
- Port Titi
- Location of Les Grangettes
- Location within France Location within Bourgogne-Franche-Comté
- Coordinates: 46°49′43″N 6°18′43″E
- Country: France
- Region: Bourgogne-Franche-Comté
- Department: Doubs
- Arrondissement: Pontarlier
- Canton: Frasne

Government
  - Mayor (2020–2026): Didier Hernandez
- Area^{1}: 5.38 km^{2} (2.08 sq mi)
- Highest elevation: 998 m (3,274 ft)
- Lowest elevation: 847 m (2,779 ft)
- Population (2023): 334
  - Density: 62.1/km^{2} (161/sq mi)
- Time zone: UTC+01:00 (CET)
  - Summer (DST): UTC+02:00 (CEST)
- INSEE/Postal code: 25295 /25160
- ^{1} French Land Register data, which excludes lakes, ponds, glaciers > 1 km^{2} (0.386 sq mi or 247 acres) and river estuaries.

Les Grangettes (French pronunciation: [le ɡʁɑ̃ʒɛt]) is a commune in the Doubs department in the Bourgogne-Franche-Comté region in eastern France.

== Population ==
Historical population
| Year | Pop. | ±% p.a. |
|---|---|---|
| 1968 | 93 | — |
| 1975 | 104 | +1.61% |
| 1982 | 144 | +4.76% |
| 1990 | 169 | +2.02% |
| 1999 | 182 | +0.83% |
| 2007 | 205 | +1.50% |
| 2012 | 268 | +5.51% |
| 2017 | 278 | +0.74% |
| 2023 | 334 | +3.11% |
Source: INSEE

== See also ==
- Communes of the Doubs department
