= Valdahon =

- Commune
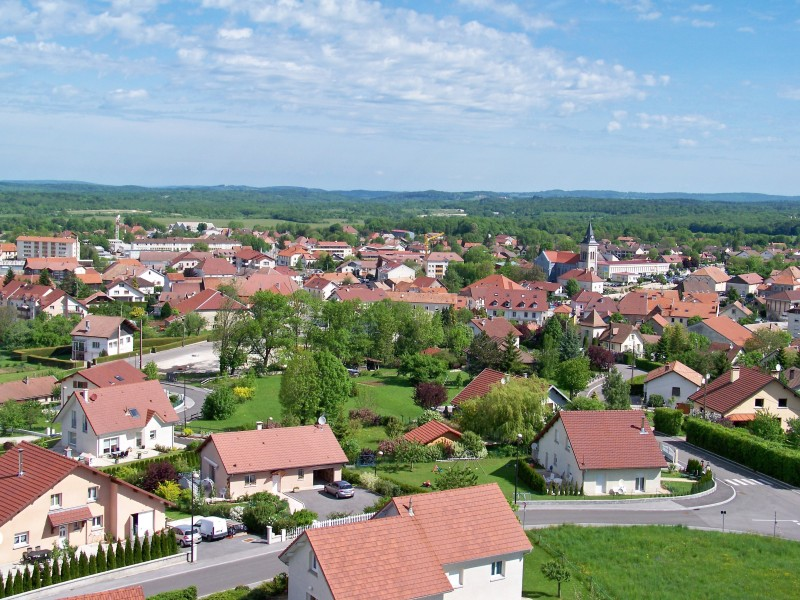
- A general view of Valdahon

- Coat of arms
- Location of Valdahon
- Location within France Location within Bourgogne-Franche-Comté
- Coordinates: 47°09′01″N 6°20′44″E
- Country: France
- Region: Bourgogne-Franche-Comté
- Department: Doubs
- Arrondissement: Pontarlier
- Canton: Valdahon

Government
  - Mayor (2020–2026): Sylvie Le Hir
- Area^{1}: 25.51 km^{2} (9.85 sq mi)
- Highest elevation: 736 m (2,415 ft)
- Lowest elevation: 531 m (1,742 ft)
- Population (2023): 5,705
  - Density: 223.6/km^{2} (579.2/sq mi)
- Time zone: UTC+01:00 (CET)
  - Summer (DST): UTC+02:00 (CEST)
- INSEE/Postal code: 25578 /25800
- ^{1} French Land Register data, which excludes lakes, ponds, glaciers > 1 km^{2} (0.386 sq mi or 247 acres) and river estuaries.

Valdahon (French pronunciation: [valdaɔ̃]) is a commune in the Doubs department in the Bourgogne-Franche-Comté region in eastern France.

== Population ==
Historical population
Year	Pop.	±% p.a.
1968	2,252	—
1975	2,597	+2.06%
1982	3,242	+3.22%
1990	3,534	+1.08%
1999	4,027	+1.46%
2007	4,777	+2.16%
2012	5,182	+1.64%
2017	5,595	+1.55%
2023	5,705	+0.33%
Source: INSEE

== Climate ==
Climate data for Valdahon-Adam-lès-Vercel (1997–2020 normals, extremes 1997–present)
Month	Jan	Feb	Mar	Apr	May	Jun	Jul	Aug	Sep	Oct	Nov	Dec	Year
Record high °C (°F)	21.0 (69.8)	21.5 (70.7)	25.8 (78.4)	27.4 (81.3)	30.7 (87.3)	35.8 (96.4)	38.4 (101.1)	37.2 (99.0)	32.7 (90.9)	28.5 (83.3)	23.5 (74.3)	18.8 (65.8)	38.4 (101.1)
Mean daily maximum °C (°F)	5.0 (41.0)	6.1 (43.0)	10.3 (50.5)	14.7 (58.5)	18.5 (65.3)	22.6 (72.7)	24.4 (75.9)	24.1 (75.4)	20.0 (68.0)	15.6 (60.1)	9.5 (49.1)	5.9 (42.6)	14.7 (58.5)
Daily mean °C (°F)	1.3 (34.3)	1.8 (35.2)	5.3 (41.5)	9.1 (48.4)	13.0 (55.4)	16.9 (62.4)	18.7 (65.7)	18.4 (65.1)	14.6 (58.3)	10.8 (51.4)	5.5 (41.9)	2.3 (36.1)	9.8 (49.6)
Mean daily minimum °C (°F)	−2.4 (27.7)	−2.5 (27.5)	0.3 (32.5)	3.5 (38.3)	7.4 (45.3)	11.1 (52.0)	12.9 (55.2)	12.7 (54.9)	9.3 (48.7)	6.0 (42.8)	1.5 (34.7)	−1.3 (29.7)	4.9 (40.8)
Record low °C (°F)	−19.4 (−2.9)	−20.1 (−4.2)	−22.9 (−9.2)	−8.6 (16.5)	−2.9 (26.8)	−0.5 (31.1)	3.6 (38.5)	4.0 (39.2)	0.7 (33.3)	−7.1 (19.2)	−14.4 (6.1)	−22.2 (−8.0)	−22.9 (−9.2)
Average precipitation mm (inches)	124.5 (4.90)	111.5 (4.39)	119.7 (4.71)	107.8 (4.24)	135.6 (5.34)	125.2 (4.93)	120.5 (4.74)	131.6 (5.18)	107.9 (4.25)	140.8 (5.54)	134.2 (5.28)	151.4 (5.96)	1,510.7 (59.48)
Average precipitation days (≥ 1.0 mm)	13.9	12.4	12.6	12.0	13.6	11.3	11.1	11.9	9.8	12.6	13.8	15.5	150.3
Source: Meteociel

== See also ==
- Communes of the Doubs department
