= Courtetain-et-Salans =

- Commune
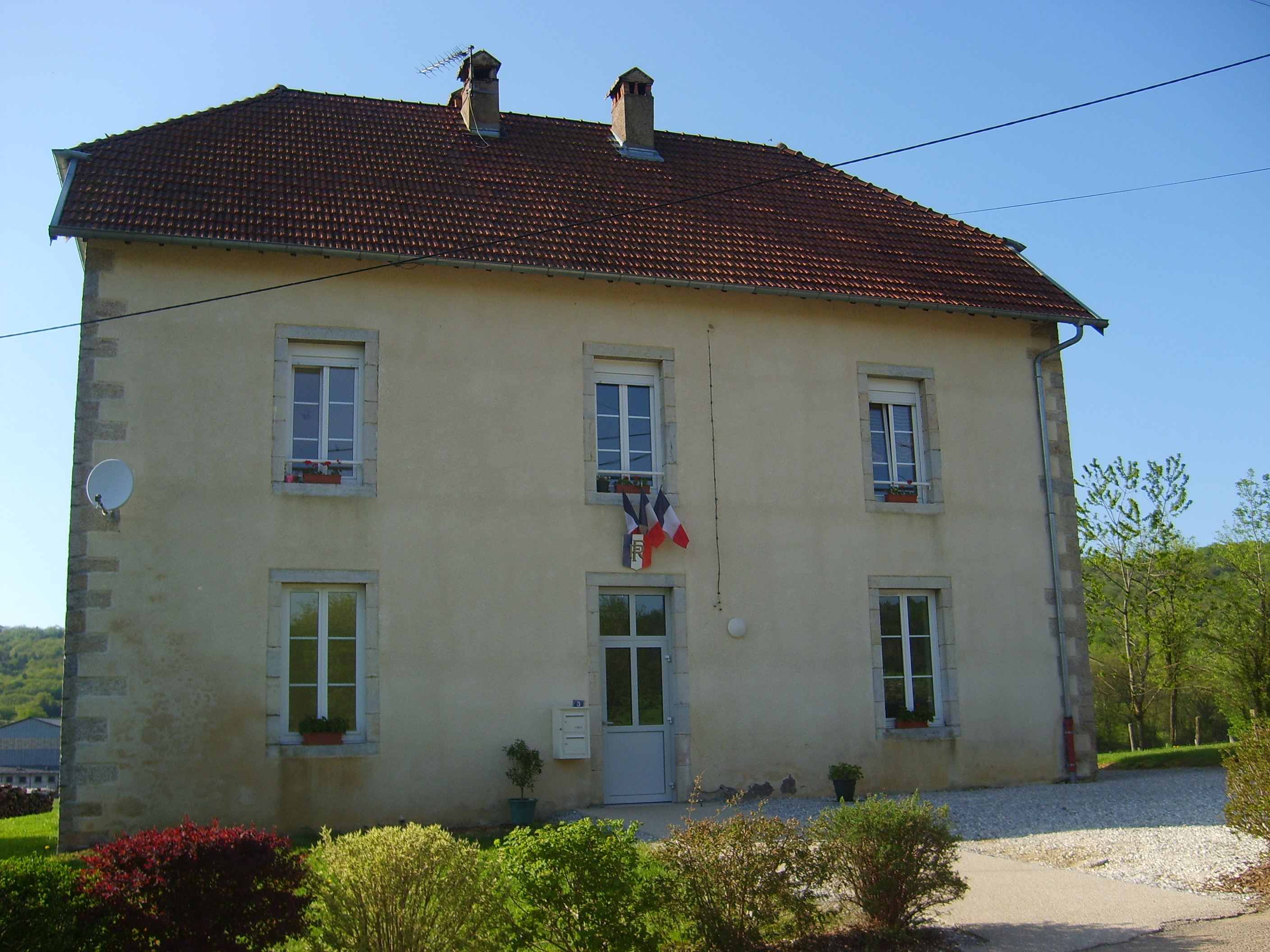
- The town hall in Courtetain-et-Salans
- Location of Courtetain-et-Salans
- Location within France Location within Bourgogne-Franche-Comté
- Coordinates: 47°15′28″N 6°25′04″E
- Country: France
- Region: Bourgogne-Franche-Comté
- Department: Doubs
- Arrondissement: Pontarlier
- Canton: Valdahon

Government
  - Mayor (2020–2026): Sandrine Corne
- Area^{1}: 6.85 km^{2} (2.64 sq mi)
- Highest elevation: 722 m (2,369 ft)
- Lowest elevation: 530 m (1,740 ft)
- Population (2023): 93
  - Density: 14/km^{2} (35/sq mi)
- Time zone: UTC+01:00 (CET)
  - Summer (DST): UTC+02:00 (CEST)
- INSEE/Postal code: 25175 /25530
- ^{1} French Land Register data, which excludes lakes, ponds, glaciers > 1 km^{2} (0.386 sq mi or 247 acres) and river estuaries.

Courtetain-et-Salans (French pronunciation: [kuʁtətɛ̃ e salɑ̃]) is a commune in the Doubs department in the Bourgogne-Franche-Comté region in eastern France.

== Population ==
Historical population
Year	Pop.	±% p.a.
1968	95	—
1975	77	−2.96%
1982	77	+0.00%
1990	76	−0.16%
1999	79	+0.43%
2007	72	−1.15%
2012	88	+4.10%
2017	84	−0.93%
2023	93	+1.71%
Source: INSEE

== See also ==
- Communes of the Doubs department
