= La Chaux, Doubs =

La Chaux
- Commune
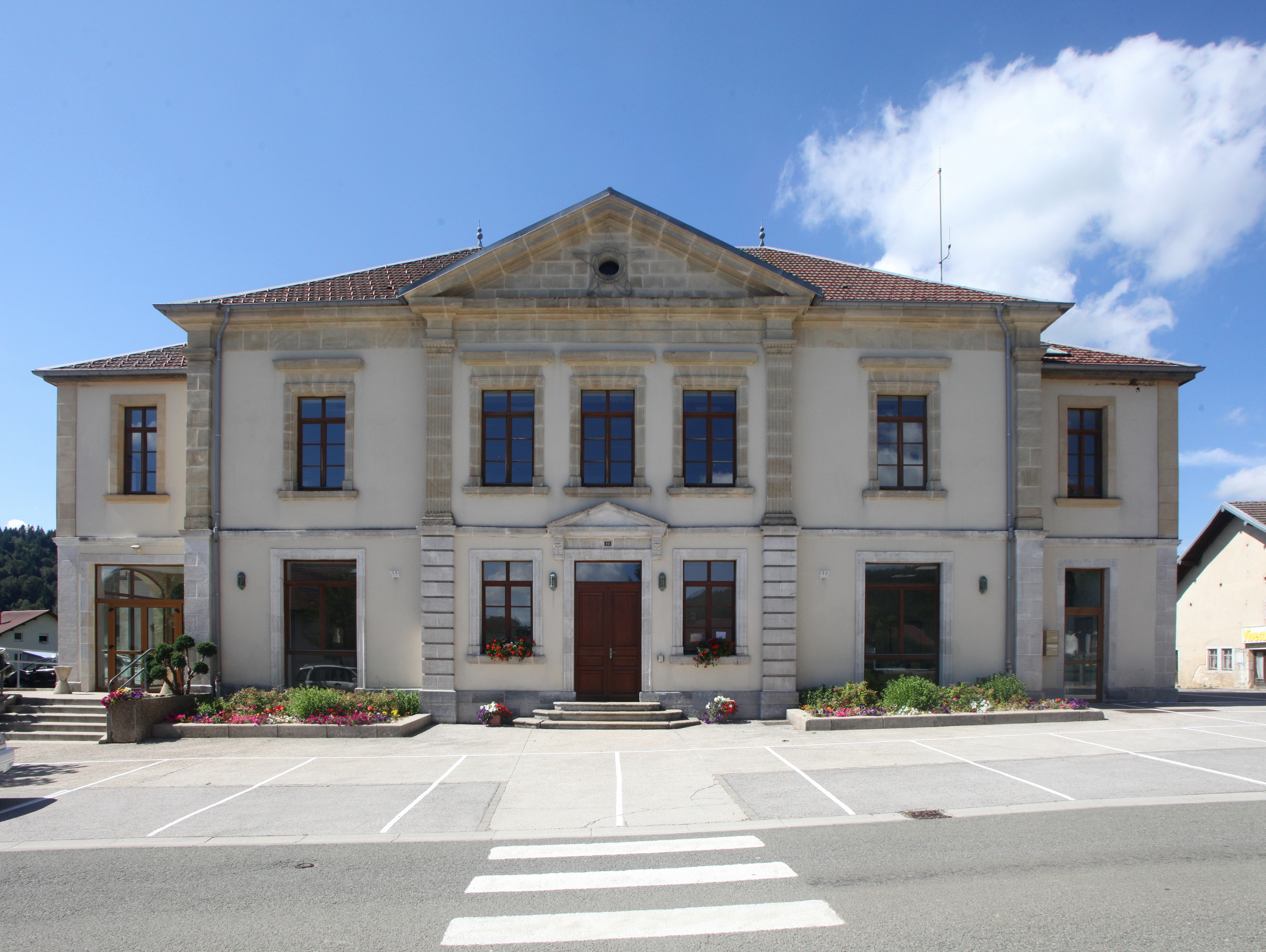
- The town hall in La Chaux
- Location of La Chaux
- Location within France Location within Bourgogne-Franche-Comté
- Coordinates: 47°01′26″N 6°26′00″E
- Country: France
- Region: Bourgogne-Franche-Comté
- Department: Doubs
- Arrondissement: Pontarlier
- Canton: Ornans
- Intercommunality: CC entre Doubs et Loue

Government
  - Mayor (2020–2026): Stéphane Lambert
- Area^{1}: 16.94 km^{2} (6.54 sq mi)
- Highest elevation: 1,113 m (3,652 ft)
- Lowest elevation: 864 m (2,835 ft)
- Population (2023): 614
  - Density: 36.2/km^{2} (93.9/sq mi)
- Time zone: UTC+01:00 (CET)
  - Summer (DST): UTC+02:00 (CEST)
- INSEE/Postal code: 25139 /25650
- ^{1} French Land Register data, which excludes lakes, ponds, glaciers > 1 km^{2} (0.386 sq mi or 247 acres) and river estuaries.

La Chaux (French pronunciation: [la ʃo]; Arpitan: La Tsâ) is a commune in the Doubs department in the Bourgogne-Franche-Comté region in eastern France.

== Population ==
Historical population
Year	Pop.	±% p.a.
1968	380	—
1975	339	−1.62%
1982	348	+0.38%
1990	351	+0.11%
1999	376	+0.77%
2007	419	+1.36%
2012	435	+0.75%
2017	558	+5.11%
2023	614	+1.61%
Source: INSEE

== See also ==
- Communes of the Doubs department
