= Jougne =

- Commune
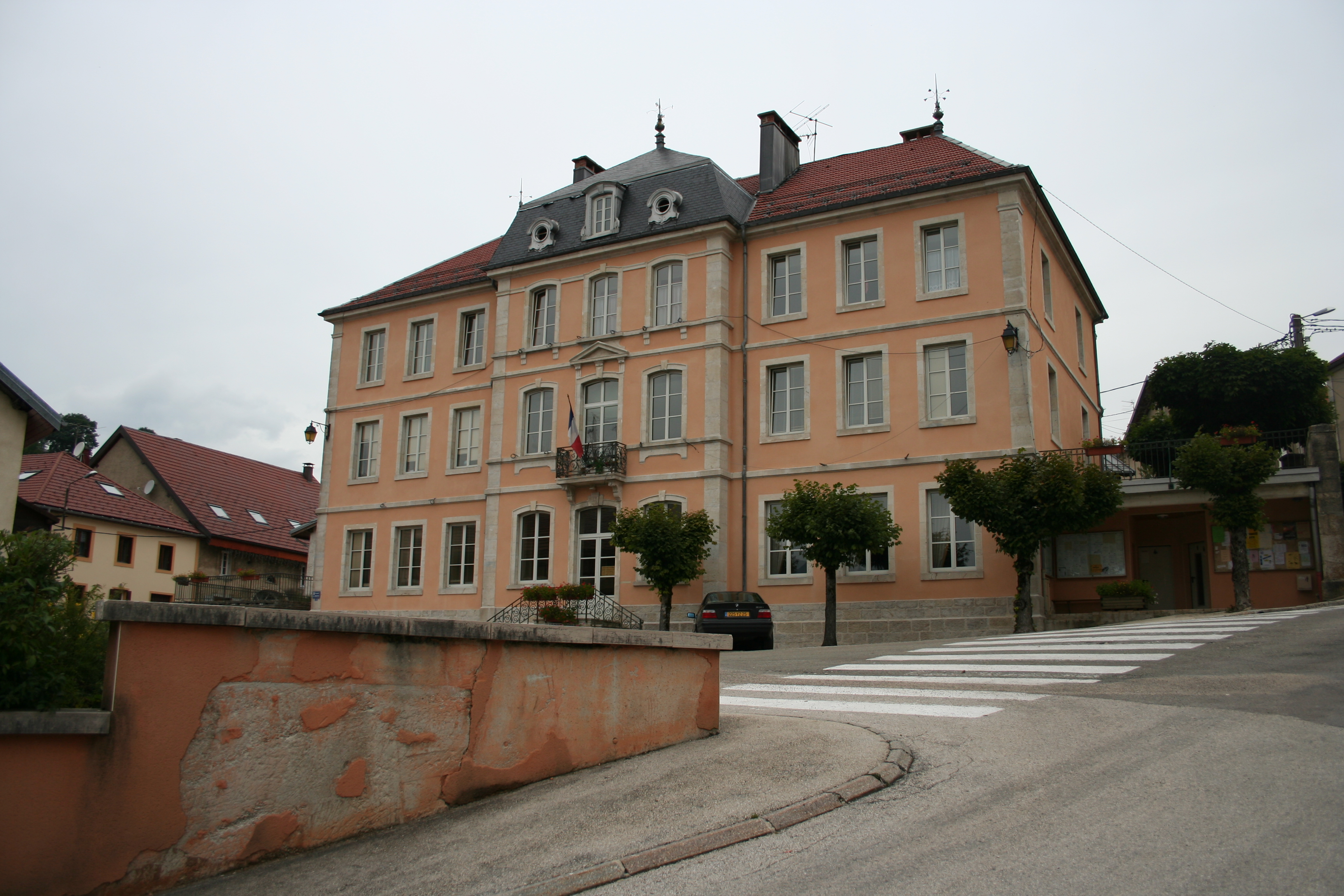
- Town hall

- Coat of arms
- Location of Jougne
- Location within France Location within Bourgogne-Franche-Comté
- Coordinates: 46°45′51″N 6°23′19″E
- Country: France
- Region: Bourgogne-Franche-Comté
- Department: Doubs
- Arrondissement: Pontarlier
- Canton: Frasne

Government
  - Mayor (2020–2026): Michel Morel
- Area^{1}: 29.03 km^{2} (11.21 sq mi)
- Highest elevation: 1,463 m (4,800 ft)
- Lowest elevation: 809 m (2,654 ft)
- Population (2023): 1,937
  - Density: 66.72/km^{2} (172.8/sq mi)
- Time zone: UTC+01:00 (CET)
  - Summer (DST): UTC+02:00 (CEST)
- INSEE/Postal code: 25318 /25370
- ^{1} French Land Register data, which excludes lakes, ponds, glaciers > 1 km^{2} (0.386 sq mi or 247 acres) and river estuaries.

Jougne (French pronunciation: [ʒuɲ]; Arpitan: Dzougne) is a commune in the Doubs department in the Bourgogne-Franche-Comté region in eastern France.

== Geography ==
The commune is situated 19 km (12 mi) from Pontarlier and 4.5 km (2.8 mi) from the Swiss border. It lies in the Jura Mountains, which form the border between France and Switzerland. The commune dominates the valley of the Jougnena. From Piquemiette, there are views of the Alps.

== History ==
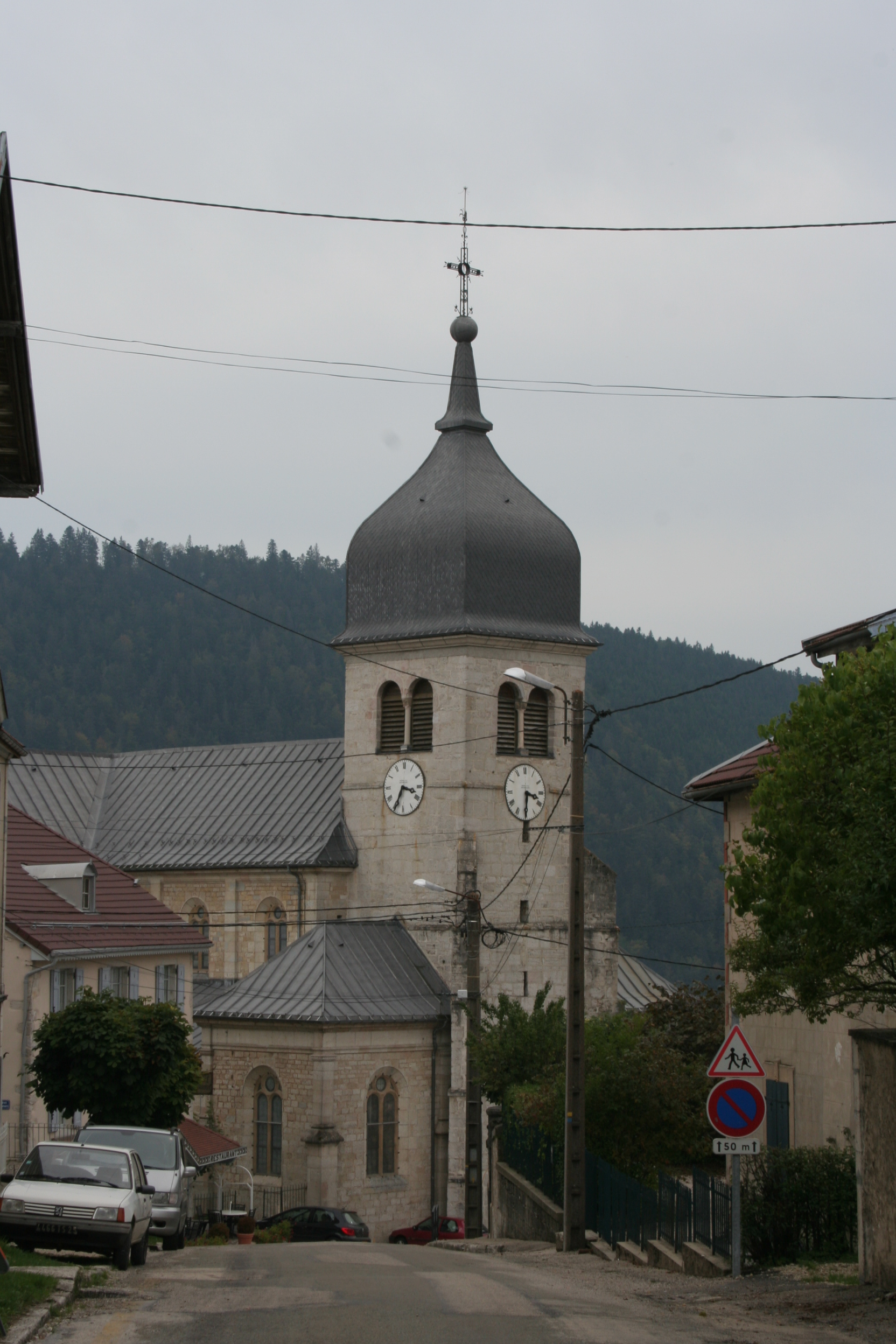
Jougne church

In the Middle Ages, Jougne was an important toll station on the road to Italy. Of the ancient fortifications, a gate and ramparts, as well as ruins of the fort, remain. The chapel of Saint Maurice dates from the 12th century and has a Carolingian crypt.

== Population ==
Historical population
| Year | Pop. | ±% p.a. |
|---|---|---|
| 1968 | 815 | — |
| 1975 | 858 | +0.74% |
| 1982 | 866 | +0.13% |
| 1990 | 1,162 | +3.74% |
| 1999 | 1,198 | +0.34% |
| 2007 | 1,347 | +1.48% |
| 2012 | 1,470 | +1.76% |
| 2017 | 1,858 | +4.80% |
| 2023 | 1,937 | +0.70% |
Source: INSEE

== Tourism ==
Jougne is a tourist town noted for winter sports. The ski resort of Piquemiette caters to alpine skiers, but there are also hiking and cross-country ski trails in the forest of la Joux. There is also an animal museum and numerous hotels and restaurants.

== Twin towns – sister cities ==
Jougne is twinned with:

- Buttigliera Alta, Italy

== See also ==
- Communes of the Doubs department
