= Orchamps-Vennes =

- Commune
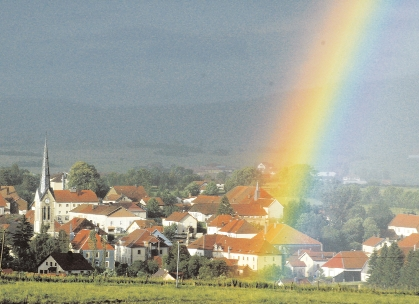
- A general view of Orchamps-Vennes

- Coat of arms
- Location of Orchamps-Vennes
- Location within France Location within Bourgogne-Franche-Comté
- Coordinates: 47°08′05″N 6°31′33″E
- Country: France
- Region: Bourgogne-Franche-Comté
- Department: Doubs
- Arrondissement: Pontarlier
- Canton: Valdahon

Government
  - Mayor (2023–2026): Marina Tassetti
- Area^{1}: 24.79 km^{2} (9.57 sq mi)
- Highest elevation: 1,020 m (3,350 ft)
- Lowest elevation: 725 m (2,379 ft)
- Population (2023): 2,189
  - Density: 88.30/km^{2} (228.7/sq mi)
- Time zone: UTC+01:00 (CET)
  - Summer (DST): UTC+02:00 (CEST)
- INSEE/Postal code: 25432 /25390
- ^{1} French Land Register data, which excludes lakes, ponds, glaciers > 1 km^{2} (0.386 sq mi or 247 acres) and river estuaries.

Orchamps-Vennes (French pronunciation: [ɔʁʃɑ̃ vɛn]) is a commune in the Doubs department in the Bourgogne-Franche-Comté region in eastern France.

== Population ==
Historical population
| Year | Pop. | ±% p.a. |
|---|---|---|
| 1968 | 1,159 | — |
| 1975 | 1,285 | +1.49% |
| 1982 | 1,417 | +1.41% |
| 1990 | 1,497 | +0.69% |
| 1999 | 1,601 | +0.75% |
| 2007 | 1,801 | +1.48% |
| 2012 | 1,940 | +1.50% |
| 2017 | 2,129 | +1.88% |
| 2023 | 2,189 | +0.46% |
Source: INSEE

== See also ==
- Communes of the Doubs department
