= Vennes =

- Commune
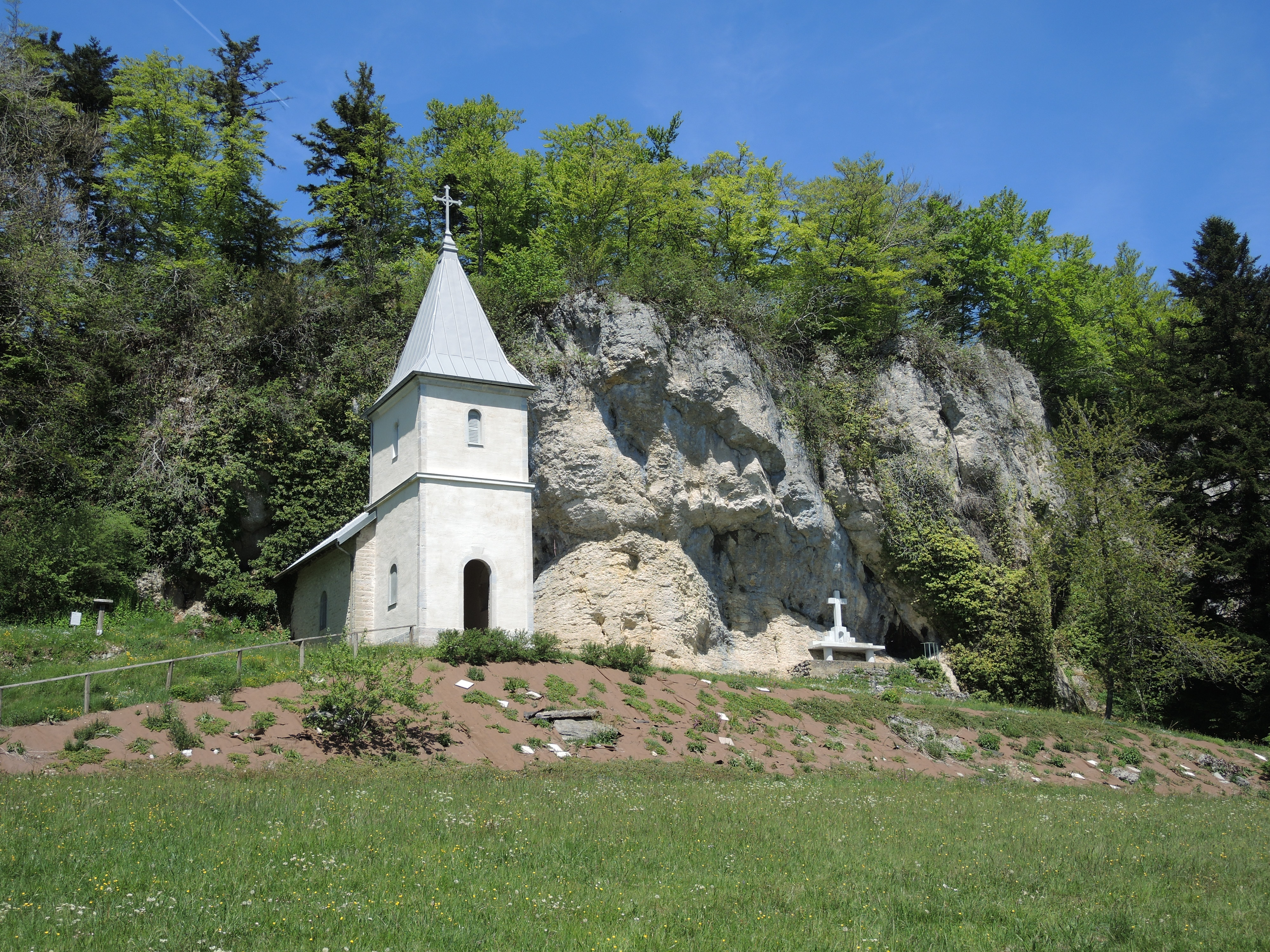
- The chapel in Vennes
- Location of Vennes
- Location within France Location within Bourgogne-Franche-Comté
- Coordinates: 47°09′12″N 6°32′52″E
- Country: France
- Region: Bourgogne-Franche-Comté
- Department: Doubs
- Arrondissement: Pontarlier
- Canton: Valdahon

Government
  - Mayor (2020–2026): David Vivot
- Area^{1}: 7.31 km^{2} (2.82 sq mi)
- Highest elevation: 1,000 m (3,300 ft)
- Lowest elevation: 758 m (2,487 ft)
- Population (2023): 238
  - Density: 32.6/km^{2} (84.3/sq mi)
- Time zone: UTC+01:00 (CET)
  - Summer (DST): UTC+02:00 (CEST)
- INSEE/Postal code: 25600 /25390
- ^{1} French Land Register data, which excludes lakes, ponds, glaciers > 1 km^{2} (0.386 sq mi or 247 acres) and river estuaries.

Vennes (French pronunciation: [vɛn]) is a commune in the Doubs department in the Bourgogne-Franche-Comté region in eastern France.

== Population ==
Historical population
Year	Pop.	±% p.a.
1968	107	—
1975	79	−4.24%
1982	76	−0.55%
1990	82	+0.95%
1999	108	+3.11%
2007	134	+2.73%
2012	146	+1.73%
2017	182	+4.51%
2023	238	+4.57%
Source: INSEE

== See also ==
- Communes of the Doubs department
