= Grandfontaine-sur-Creuse =

- Commune
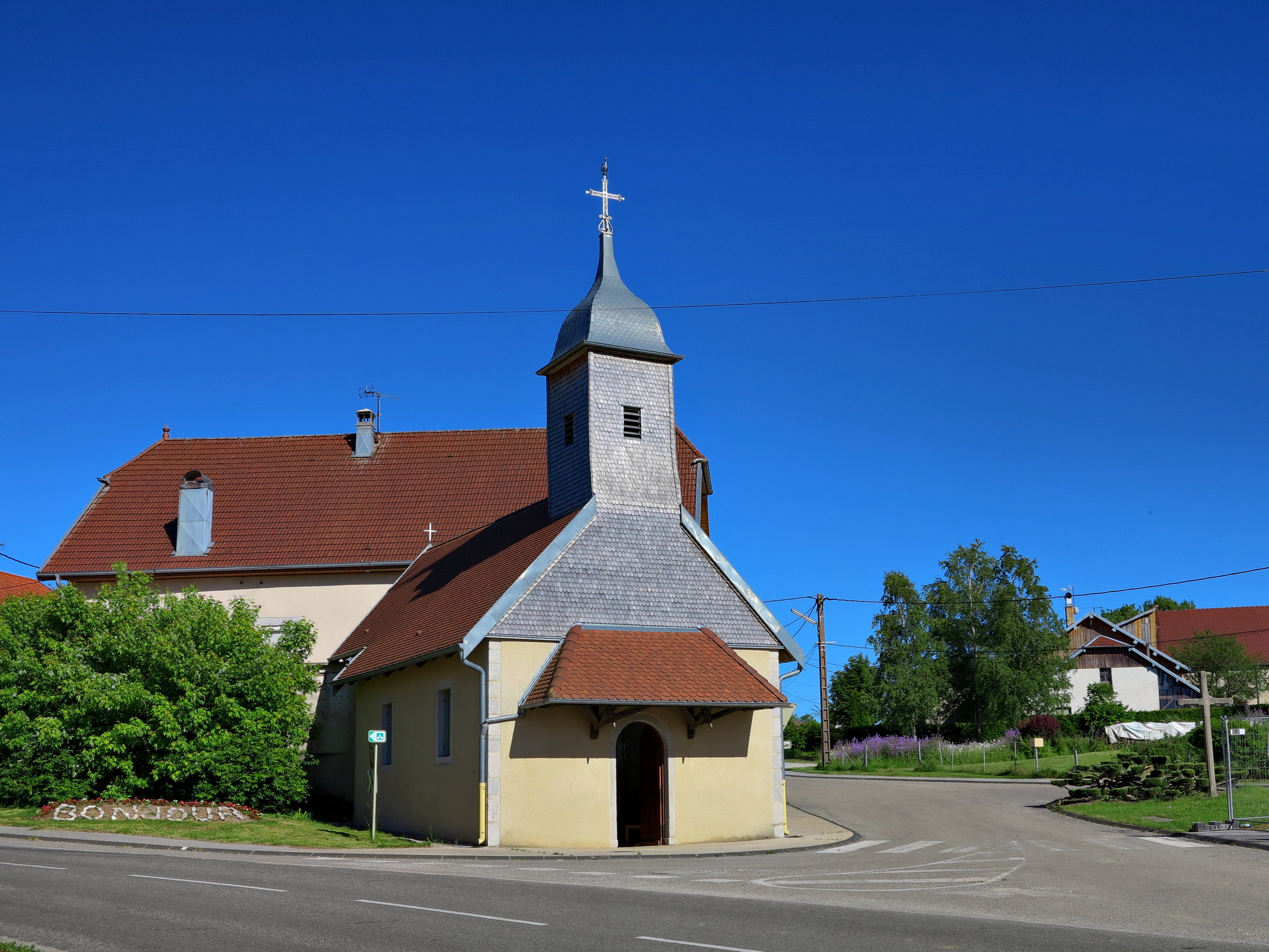
- The chapel in Grandfontaine-sur-Creuse
- Location of Grandfontaine-sur-Creuse
- Location within France Location within Bourgogne-Franche-Comté
- Coordinates: 47°11′37″N 6°27′18″E
- Country: France
- Region: Bourgogne-Franche-Comté
- Department: Doubs
- Arrondissement: Pontarlier
- Canton: Valdahon
- Intercommunality: Portes du Haut-Doubs

Government
  - Mayor (2024–2026): Damien Bertin
- Area^{1}: 5.9 km^{2} (2.3 sq mi)
- Highest elevation: 744 m (2,441 ft)
- Lowest elevation: 684 m (2,244 ft)
- Population (2023): 75
  - Density: 13/km^{2} (33/sq mi)
- Time zone: UTC+01:00 (CET)
  - Summer (DST): UTC+02:00 (CEST)
- INSEE/Postal code: 25289 /25510
- ^{1} French Land Register data, which excludes lakes, ponds, glaciers > 1 km^{2} (0.386 sq mi or 247 acres) and river estuaries.

Grandfontaine-sur-Creuse (French pronunciation: [ɡʁɑ̃fɔ̃tɛn syʁ kʁøz]) is a commune in the Doubs department in the Bourgogne-Franche-Comté region in eastern France.

== Population ==
Historical population
Year	Pop.	±% p.a.
1968	112	—
1975	101	−1.47%
1982	84	−2.60%
1990	70	−2.25%
1999	74	+0.62%
2007	87	+2.04%
2012	77	−2.41%
2017	72	−1.33%
2023	75	+0.68%
Source: INSEE

== See also ==
- Communes of the Doubs department
