= Flangebouche =

- Commune
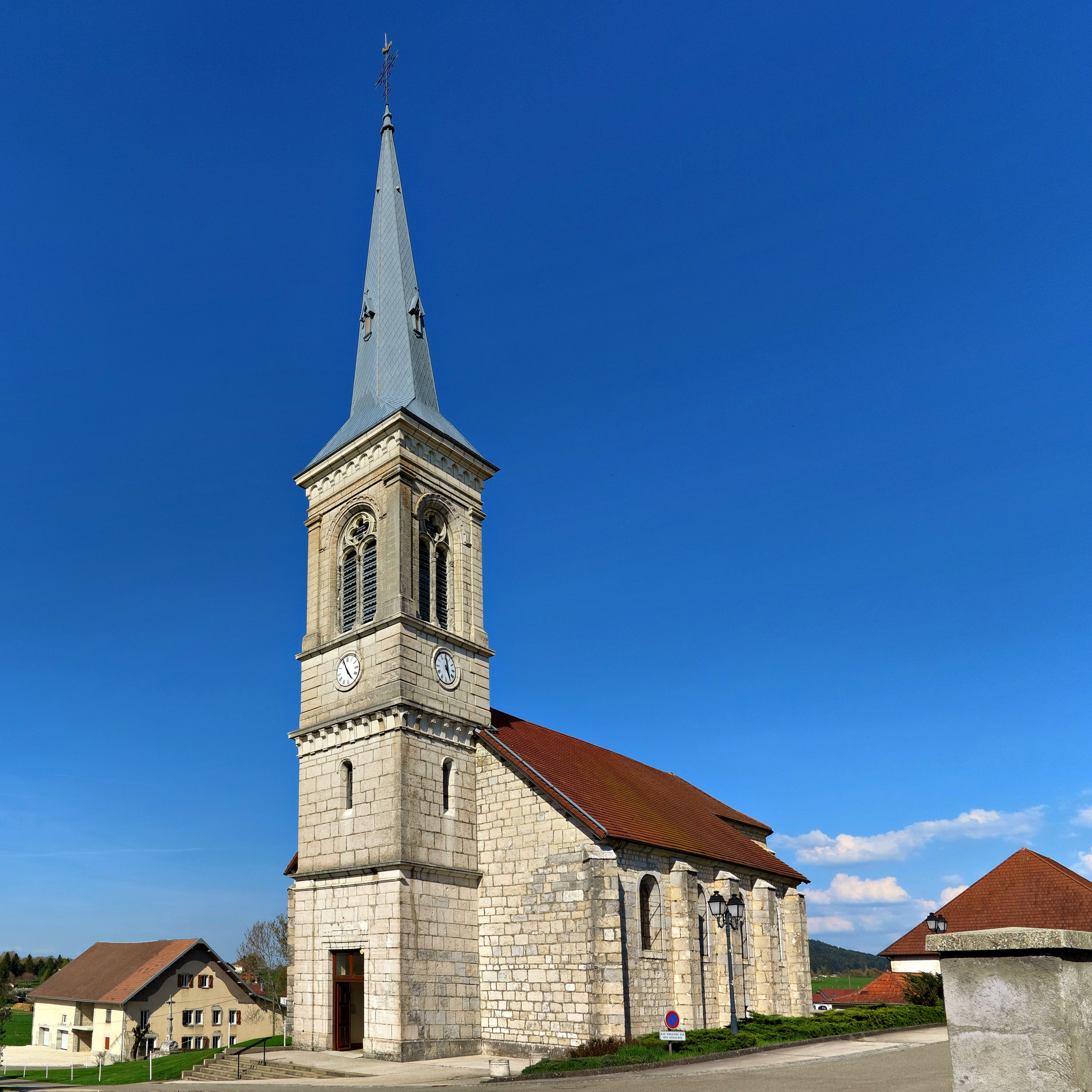
- The church in Flangebouche
- Location of Flangebouche
- Location within France Location within Bourgogne-Franche-Comté
- Coordinates: 47°08′27″N 6°28′21″E
- Country: France
- Region: Bourgogne-Franche-Comté
- Department: Doubs
- Arrondissement: Pontarlier
- Canton: Valdahon
- Intercommunality: Portes du Haut-Doubs

Government
  - Mayor (2020–2026): Fabrice Vivot
- Area^{1}: 23.27 km^{2} (8.98 sq mi)
- Highest elevation: 1,056 m (3,465 ft)
- Lowest elevation: 685 m (2,247 ft)
- Population (2023): 850
  - Density: 37/km^{2} (95/sq mi)
- Time zone: UTC+01:00 (CET)
  - Summer (DST): UTC+02:00 (CEST)
- INSEE/Postal code: 25243 /25390
- ^{1} French Land Register data, which excludes lakes, ponds, glaciers > 1 km^{2} (0.386 sq mi or 247 acres) and river estuaries.

Flangebouche (French pronunciation: [flɑ̃ʒbuʃ]) is a commune in the Doubs department in the Bourgogne-Franche-Comté region in eastern France.

== Population ==
Historical population
Year	Pop.	±% p.a.
1968	582	—
1975	523	−1.52%
1982	527	+0.11%
1990	558	+0.72%
1999	549	−0.18%
2007	629	+1.71%
2012	711	+2.48%
2017	779	+1.84%
2023	850	+1.46%
Source: INSEE

== See also ==
- Communes of the Doubs department
