= Malbuisson =

- Commune
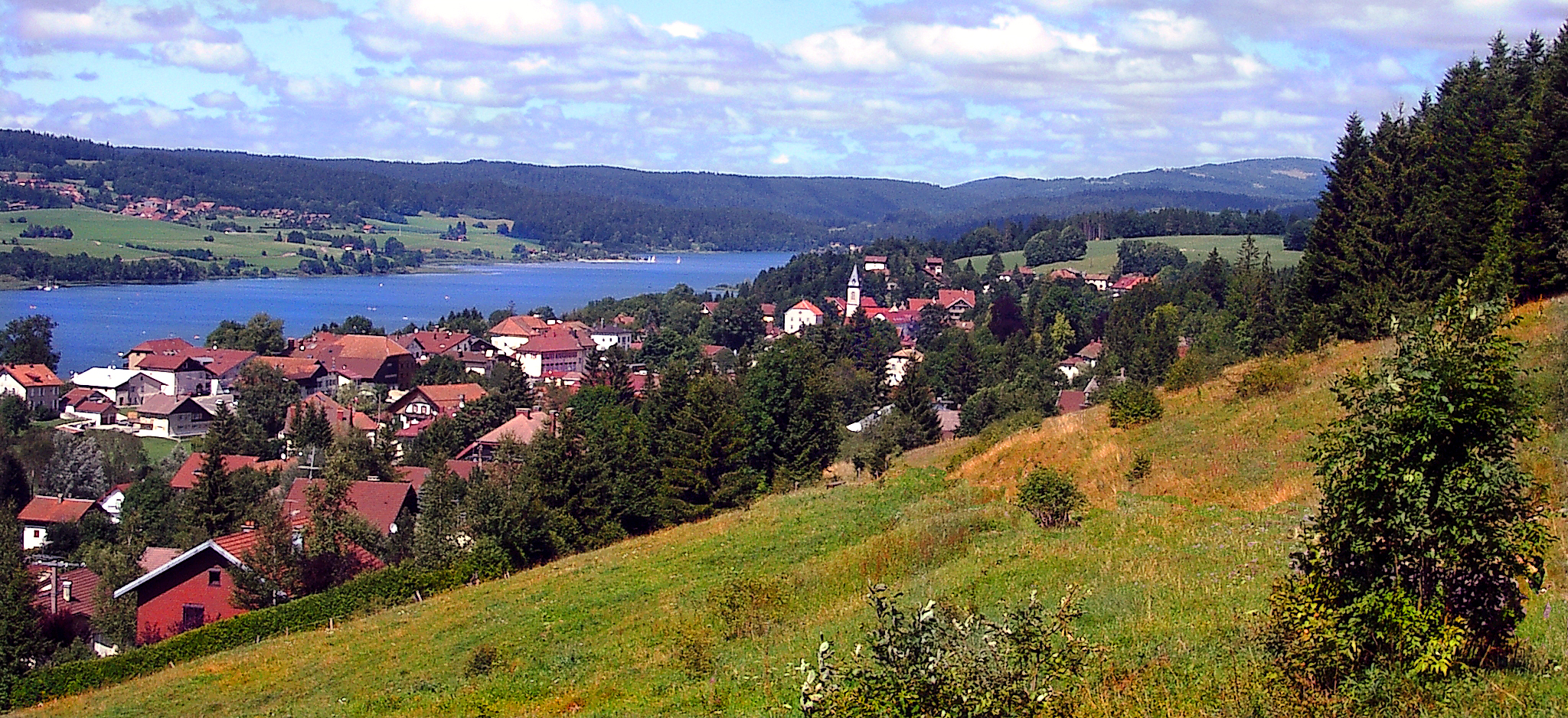
- Malbuisson on the bank of Lake Saint-Point

- Coat of arms
- Location of Malbuisson
- Location within France Location within Bourgogne-Franche-Comté
- Coordinates: 46°47′56″N 6°18′15″E
- Country: France
- Region: Bourgogne-Franche-Comté
- Department: Doubs
- Arrondissement: Pontarlier
- Canton: Frasne

Government
  - Mayor (2020–2026): Claude Lietta
- Area^{1}: 6.6 km^{2} (2.5 sq mi)
- Highest elevation: 1,091 m (3,579 ft)
- Lowest elevation: 846 m (2,776 ft)
- Population (2023): 903
  - Density: 140/km^{2} (350/sq mi)
- Time zone: UTC+01:00 (CET)
  - Summer (DST): UTC+02:00 (CEST)
- INSEE/Postal code: 25361 /25160
- ^{1} French Land Register data, which excludes lakes, ponds, glaciers > 1 km^{2} (0.386 sq mi or 247 acres) and river estuaries.

Malbuisson (French pronunciation: [malbɥisɔ̃]) is a commune in the Doubs department in the Bourgogne-Franche-Comté region in eastern France.

== Overview ==
On a terrace above Lake Saint-Point, between water and forest, the village of Malbuisson stretches for two kilometers between Vézenay, a formerly separate village, and the forest of "La Fuvelle". At the beginning of the 20th century, Malbuisson saw a significant expansion with the development of tourism, made possible by the construction of a railway line named the "Tacot" between Pontarlier and Foncine. Then classified "station climatérique" (alt. 900 m), Malbuisson became a pleasant destination for the rich people of Pontarlier and Besançon, but also for Parisians. Since then, the economy of the village has developed mainly around tourism and continues by offering:

- Nordic skiing, Mountain bike trails, hiking or snow shoe excursions in the surrounding mountains
- boating, pedal boats, fishing and swimming in the lake
- hotel establishments and restaurants, and shops offering local products
- nature reserves

== Geography ==
Malbuisson lies 15 km (9.3 mi) south of Pontarlier on the Lac de Saint-Point.

== Population ==
Historical population
Year	Pop.	±% p.a.
1968	267	—
1975	298	+1.58%
1982	335	+1.69%
1990	366	+1.11%
1999	400	+0.99%
2007	566	+4.43%
2012	757	+5.99%
2017	855	+2.46%
2023	903	+0.91%
Source: INSEE

== Tourism ==
Malbuisson is a village typical of the “Franche-Comté” region, located on the edge of the Saint-Point lake, at an altitude of 850m to 1000m, close to the landmark of the area: Le Mont D’or at 1463m.

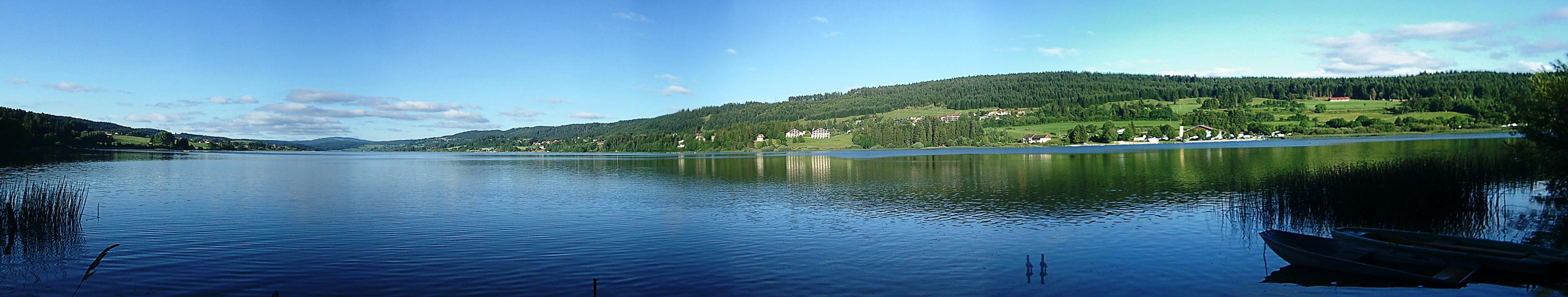
Malbuisson on Saint-Point lake

== Economy ==
In addition to tourism, Malbuisson has one of the last cheese factories to produce Comté cheese in the traditional fashion in big copper cauldrons.

== See also ==
- Communes of the Doubs department
