= Pierrefontaine-les-Varans =

- Commune
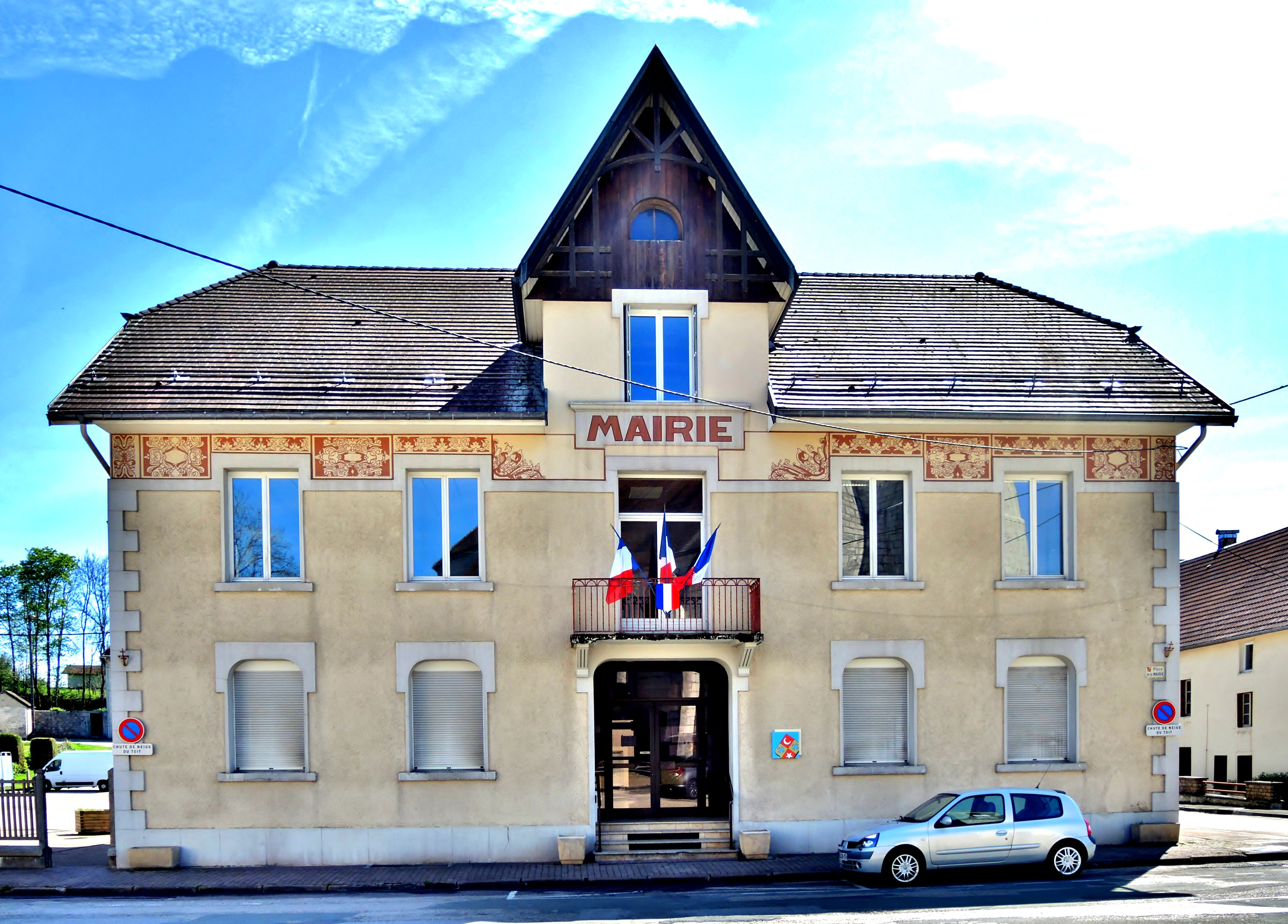
- The town hall in Pierrefontaine-les-Varans

- Coat of arms
- Location of Pierrefontaine-les-Varans
- Location within France Location within Bourgogne-Franche-Comté
- Coordinates: 47°12′57″N 6°32′21″E
- Country: France
- Region: Bourgogne-Franche-Comté
- Department: Doubs
- Arrondissement: Pontarlier
- Canton: Valdahon

Government
  - Mayor (2020–2026): Daniel Prieur
- Area^{1}: 28.9 km^{2} (11.2 sq mi)
- Highest elevation: 943 m (3,094 ft)
- Lowest elevation: 464 m (1,522 ft)
- Population (2023): 1,356
  - Density: 46.9/km^{2} (122/sq mi)
- Time zone: UTC+01:00 (CET)
  - Summer (DST): UTC+02:00 (CEST)
- INSEE/Postal code: 25453 /25510
- ^{1} French Land Register data, which excludes lakes, ponds, glaciers > 1 km^{2} (0.386 sq mi or 247 acres) and river estuaries.

Pierrefontaine-les-Varans (French pronunciation: [pjɛʁfɔ̃tɛn le vaʁɑ̃]) is a commune in the Doubs department in the Bourgogne-Franche-Comté region in eastern France.

== Population ==
Historical population
Year	Pop.	±% p.a.
1968	1,412	—
1975	1,501	+0.88%
1982	1,538	+0.35%
1990	1,505	−0.27%
1999	1,351	−1.19%
2007	1,271	−0.76%
2012	1,422	+2.27%
2017	1,421	−0.01%
2023	1,356	−0.78%
Source: INSEE

== See also ==
- Communes of the Doubs department
