= Les Fourgs =

- Commune
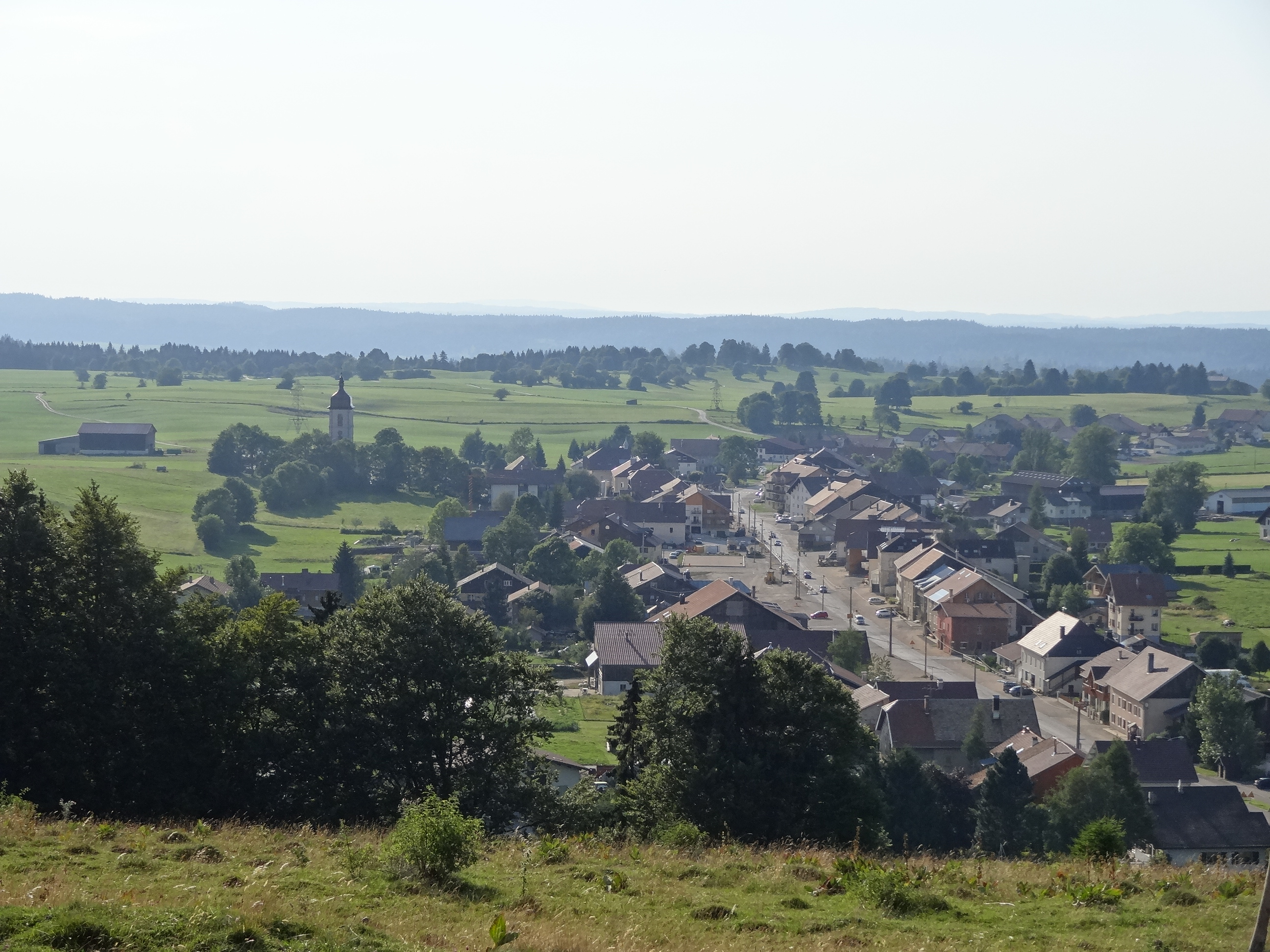
- A general view of Les Fourgs

- Coat of arms
- Location of Les Fourgs
- Location within France Location within Bourgogne-Franche-Comté
- Coordinates: 46°50′06″N 6°24′22″E
- Country: France
- Region: Bourgogne-Franche-Comté
- Department: Doubs
- Arrondissement: Pontarlier
- Canton: Frasne
- Intercommunality: Lacs et Montagnes du Haut-Doubs

Government
  - Mayor (2020–2026): Roger Belot
- Area^{1}: 27.99 km^{2} (10.81 sq mi)
- Highest elevation: 1,242 m (4,075 ft)
- Lowest elevation: 899 m (2,949 ft)
- Population (2023): 1,443
  - Density: 51.55/km^{2} (133.5/sq mi)
- Time zone: UTC+01:00 (CET)
  - Summer (DST): UTC+02:00 (CEST)
- INSEE/Postal code: 25254 /25300
- ^{1} French Land Register data, which excludes lakes, ponds, glaciers > 1 km^{2} (0.386 sq mi or 247 acres) and river estuaries.

Les Fourgs (French pronunciation: [le fuʁ]) is a commune in the Doubs department in the Bourgogne-Franche-Comté region in the eastern part of France.

== Population ==
Historical population
Year	Pop.	±% p.a.
1968	742	—
1975	753	+0.21%
1982	806	+0.98%
1990	941	+1.95%
1999	1,058	+1.31%
2007	1,179	+1.36%
2012	1,267	+1.45%
2017	1,381	+1.74%
2023	1,443	+0.73%
Source: INSEE

== See also ==
- Communes of the Doubs department
