= Rochejean =

- Commune
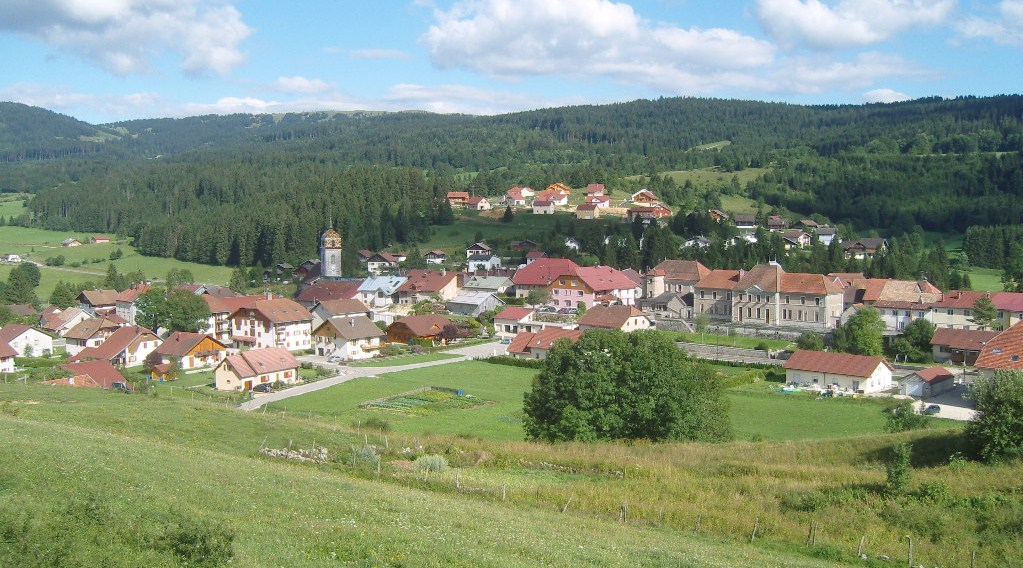
- A general view of Rochejean

- Coat of arms
- Location of Rochejean
- Location within France Location within Bourgogne-Franche-Comté
- Coordinates: 46°44′47″N 6°17′39″E
- Country: France
- Region: Bourgogne-Franche-Comté
- Department: Doubs
- Arrondissement: Pontarlier
- Canton: Frasne

Government
  - Mayor (2024–2026): Florence Schiavon
- Area^{1}: 24.32 km^{2} (9.39 sq mi)
- Highest elevation: 1,381 m (4,531 ft)
- Lowest elevation: 870 m (2,850 ft)
- Population (2023): 754
  - Density: 31.0/km^{2} (80.3/sq mi)
- Time zone: UTC+01:00 (CET)
  - Summer (DST): UTC+02:00 (CEST)
- INSEE/Postal code: 25494 /25370
- ^{1} French Land Register data, which excludes lakes, ponds, glaciers > 1 km^{2} (0.386 sq mi or 247 acres) and river estuaries.

Rochejean (French pronunciation: [ʁɔʃʒɑ̃]) is a commune in the Doubs département in the Bourgogne-Franche-Comté region in eastern France.

== Geography ==
Rochejean lies 10 km (6.2 mi) northeast of Mouthe.

=== Climate ===
Climate data for La Boissaude Rochejean, 1222m (1991−2020 normals)
Month	Jan	Feb	Mar	Apr	May	Jun	Jul	Aug	Sep	Oct	Nov	Dec	Year
Mean daily maximum °C (°F)	2.1 (35.8)	2.7 (36.9)	5.9 (42.6)	11.0 (51.8)	13.7 (56.7)	17.9 (64.2)	20.3 (68.5)	19.5 (67.1)	16.0 (60.8)	12.1 (53.8)	6.8 (44.2)	3.3 (37.9)	10.9 (51.7)
Daily mean °C (°F)	−1.2 (29.8)	−1 (30)	1.9 (35.4)	6.2 (43.2)	9.1 (48.4)	13.0 (55.4)	15.1 (59.2)	14.5 (58.1)	11.4 (52.5)	8.0 (46.4)	3.3 (37.9)	−0.1 (31.8)	6.7 (44.0)
Mean daily minimum °C (°F)	−4.5 (23.9)	−4.7 (23.5)	−2 (28)	1.4 (34.5)	4.5 (40.1)	8.0 (46.4)	9.9 (49.8)	9.4 (48.9)	6.8 (44.2)	3.8 (38.8)	−0.2 (31.6)	−3.5 (25.7)	2.4 (36.3)
Average precipitation mm (inches)	108.2 (4.26)	97.7 (3.85)	98.9 (3.89)	88.3 (3.48)	133.3 (5.25)	134.7 (5.30)	143.7 (5.66)	133.8 (5.27)	99.5 (3.92)	108.7 (4.28)	115.5 (4.55)	139.1 (5.48)	1,401.4 (55.19)
Source: Météo-France

== Population ==
Historical population
Year	Pop.	±% p.a.
1968	261	—
1975	246	−0.84%
1982	286	+2.18%
1990	389	+3.92%
1999	430	+1.12%
2007	512	+2.21%
2012	644	+4.69%
2017	672	+0.85%
2023	754	+1.94%
Source: INSEE

== See also ==
- Communes of the Doubs department
