= Vercel-Villedieu-le-Camp =

- Commune
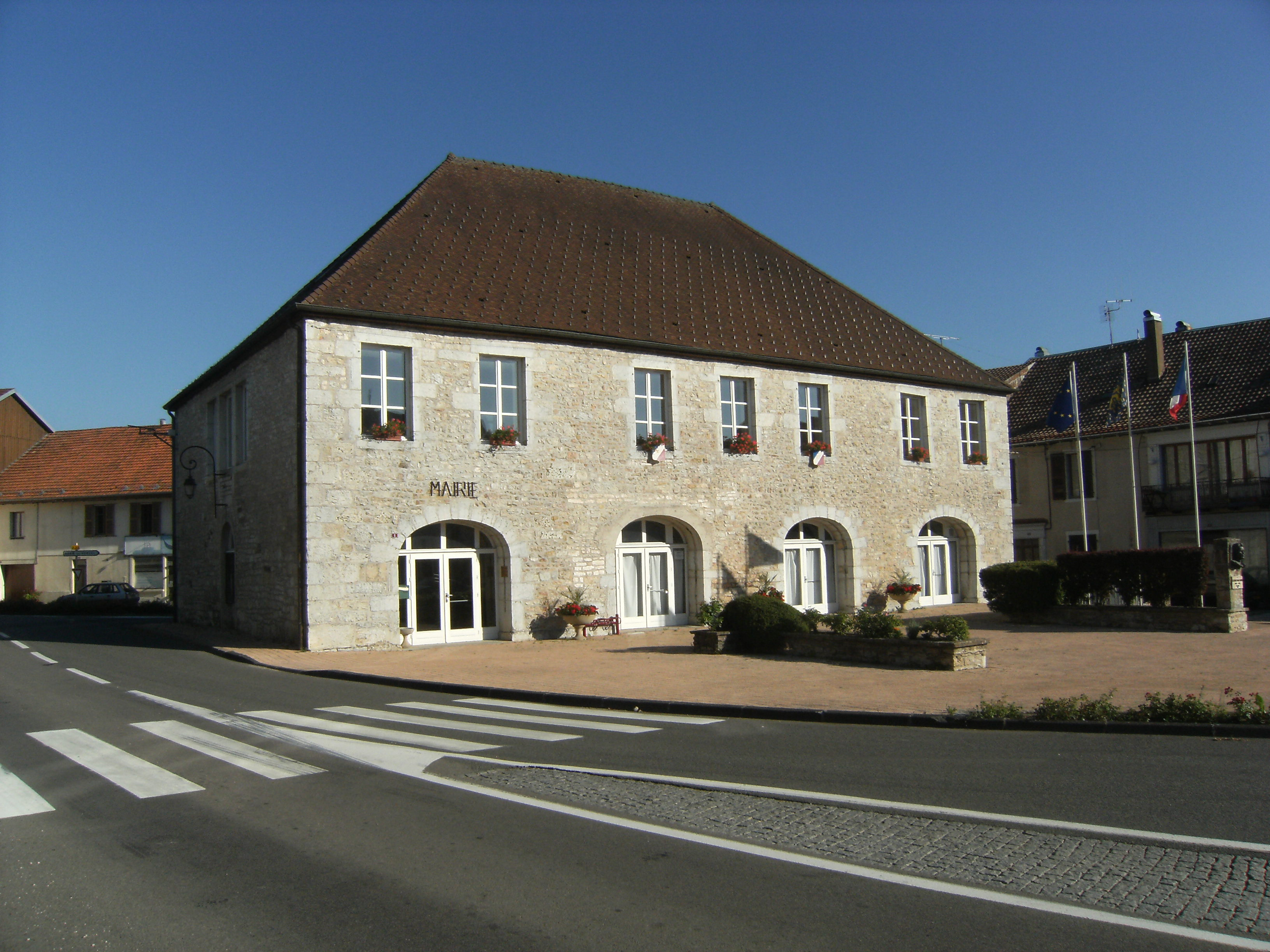
- The town hall in Vercel

- Coat of arms
- Location of Vercel-Villedieu-le-Camp
- Location within France Location within Bourgogne-Franche-Comté
- Coordinates: 47°11′05″N 6°23′59″E
- Country: France
- Region: Bourgogne-Franche-Comté
- Department: Doubs
- Arrondissement: Pontarlier
- Canton: Valdahon
- Intercommunality: Portes du Haut-Doubs

Government
  - Mayor (2020–2026): Christian Vermot-Desroches
- Area^{1}: 29.96 km^{2} (11.57 sq mi)
- Highest elevation: 828 m (2,717 ft)
- Lowest elevation: 549 m (1,801 ft)
- Population (2023): 1,762
  - Density: 58.81/km^{2} (152.3/sq mi)
- Time zone: UTC+01:00 (CET)
  - Summer (DST): UTC+02:00 (CEST)
- INSEE/Postal code: 25601 /25530
- ^{1} French Land Register data, which excludes lakes, ponds, glaciers > 1 km^{2} (0.386 sq mi or 247 acres) and river estuaries.

Vercel-Villedieu-le-Camp (French pronunciation: [vɛʁsɛl vildjø lə kɑ̃]) is a commune in the Doubs department in the Bourgogne-Franche-Comté region in eastern France.

== Population ==
Historical population
Year	Pop.	±% p.a.
1968	975	—
1975	1,041	+0.94%
1982	1,068	+0.37%
1990	1,088	+0.23%
1999	1,213	+1.22%
2007	1,414	+1.94%
2012	1,500	+1.19%
2017	1,591	+1.18%
2023	1,762	+1.72%
Source: INSEE

== See also ==
- Communes of the Doubs department
