= Le Luhier =

- Commune
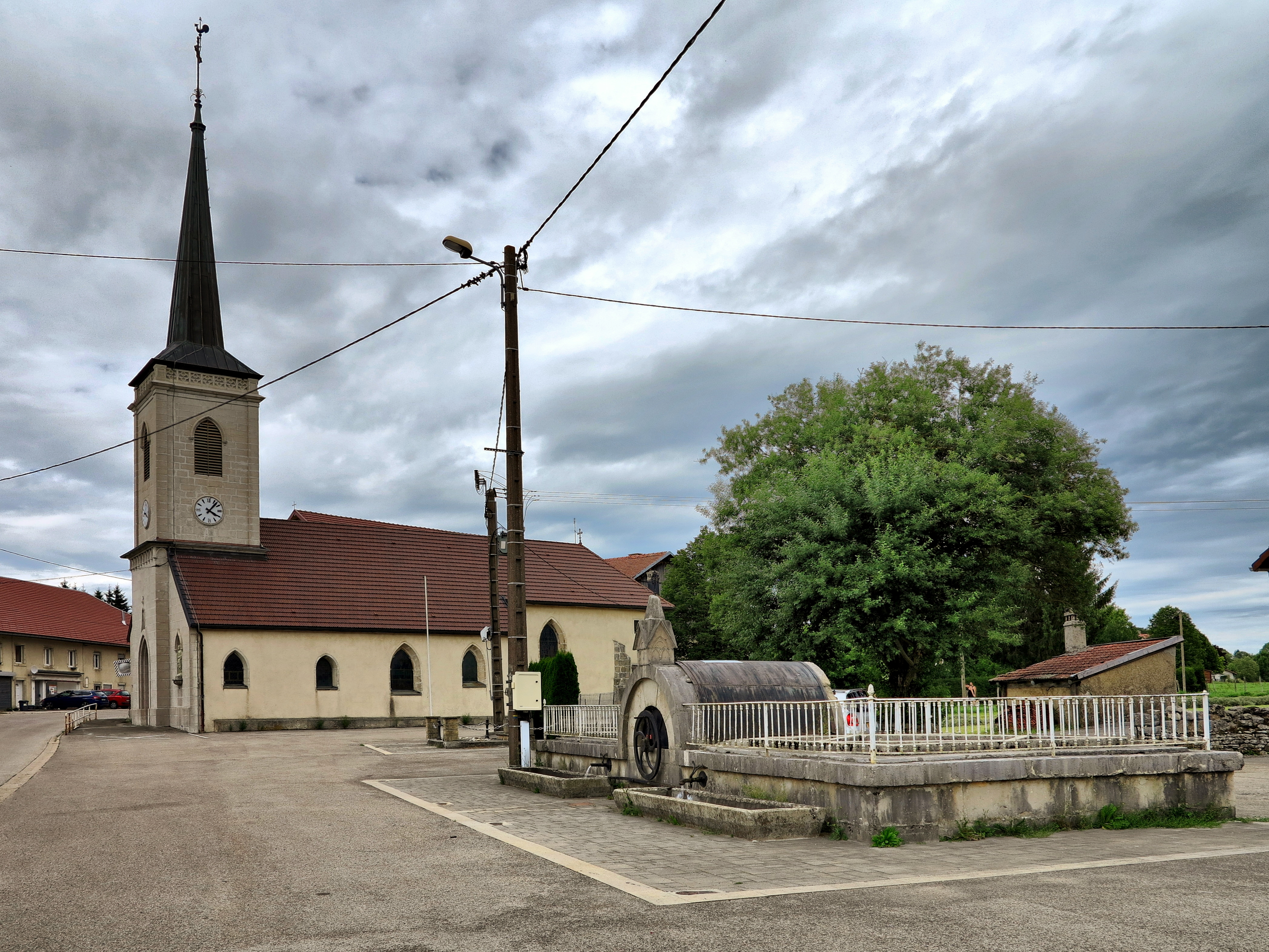
- The fountain and church in Le Luhier
- Location of Le Luhier
- Location within France Location within Bourgogne-Franche-Comté
- Coordinates: 47°10′09″N 6°39′36″E
- Country: France
- Region: Bourgogne-Franche-Comté
- Department: Doubs
- Arrondissement: Pontarlier
- Canton: Morteau
- Intercommunality: Plateau du Russey

Government
  - Mayor (2020–2026): Eric Humbert
- Area^{1}: 5.21 km^{2} (2.01 sq mi)
- Highest elevation: 1,050 m (3,440 ft)
- Lowest elevation: 790 m (2,590 ft)
- Population (2023): 244
  - Density: 46.8/km^{2} (121/sq mi)
- Time zone: UTC+01:00 (CET)
  - Summer (DST): UTC+02:00 (CEST)
- INSEE/Postal code: 25351 /25210
- ^{1} French Land Register data, which excludes lakes, ponds, glaciers > 1 km^{2} (0.386 sq mi or 247 acres) and river estuaries.

Le Luhier (French pronunciation: [lə lyje]) is a commune in the Doubs department in the Bourgogne-Franche-Comté region in eastern France.

== Geography ==
The commune is located 9 km (5.6 mi) east of Le Russey on the road from Maîche to Besançon.

== Population ==
Historical population
Year	Pop.	±% p.a.
1968	162	—
1975	137	−2.37%
1982	148	+1.11%
1990	160	+0.98%
1999	146	−1.01%
2007	182	+2.79%
2012	199	+1.80%
2017	222	+2.21%
2023	244	+1.59%
Source: INSEE

== See also ==
- Communes of the Doubs department
