= Le Mémont =

- Commune
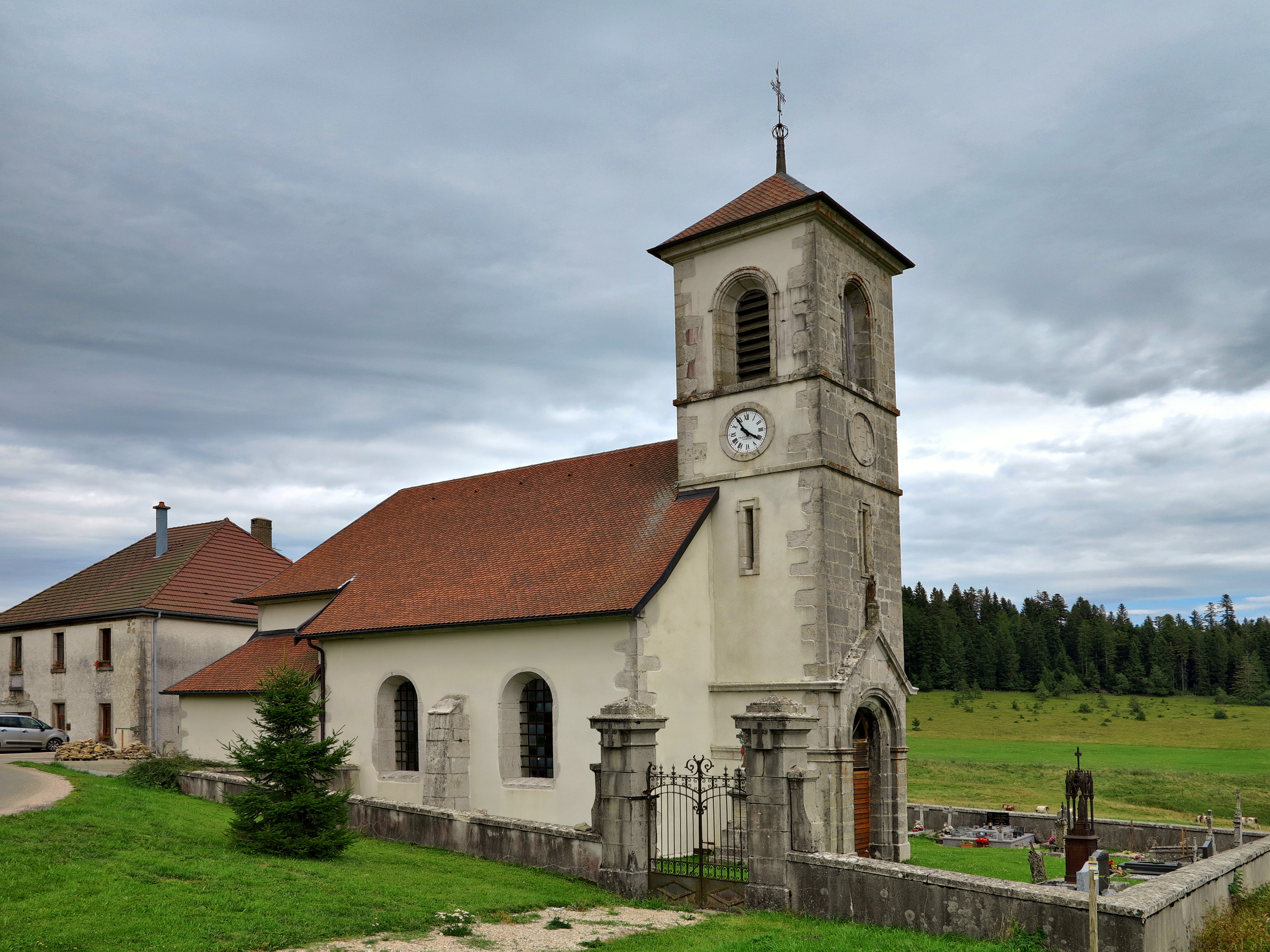
- The church in Le Mémont
- Location of Le Mémont
- Location within France Location within Bourgogne-Franche-Comté
- Coordinates: 47°09′25″N 6°40′57″E
- Country: France
- Region: Bourgogne-Franche-Comté
- Department: Doubs
- Arrondissement: Pontarlier
- Canton: Morteau
- Intercommunality: Plateau du Russey

Government
  - Mayor (2020–2026): Lucine Faivre
- Area^{1}: 3.16 km^{2} (1.22 sq mi)
- Highest elevation: 1,051 m (3,448 ft)
- Lowest elevation: 940 m (3,080 ft)
- Population (2023): 47
  - Density: 15/km^{2} (39/sq mi)
- Time zone: UTC+01:00 (CET)
  - Summer (DST): UTC+02:00 (CEST)
- INSEE/Postal code: 25373 /25210
- ^{1} French Land Register data, which excludes lakes, ponds, glaciers > 1 km^{2} (0.386 sq mi or 247 acres) and river estuaries.

Le Mémont (French pronunciation: [lə memɔ̃]) is a commune in the Doubs department in the Bourgogne-Franche-Comté region in eastern France.

== Geography ==
The commune lies 4 km (2.5 mi) from Le Russey.

== Population ==
Historical population
Year	Pop.	±% p.a.
1968	43	—
1975	37	−2.12%
1982	27	−4.40%
1990	24	−1.46%
1999	30	+2.51%
2007	39	+3.33%
2012	41	+1.01%
2017	44	+1.42%
2023	47	+1.11%
Source: INSEE

== See also ==
- Communes of the Doubs department
