= Montbéliardot =

- Commune
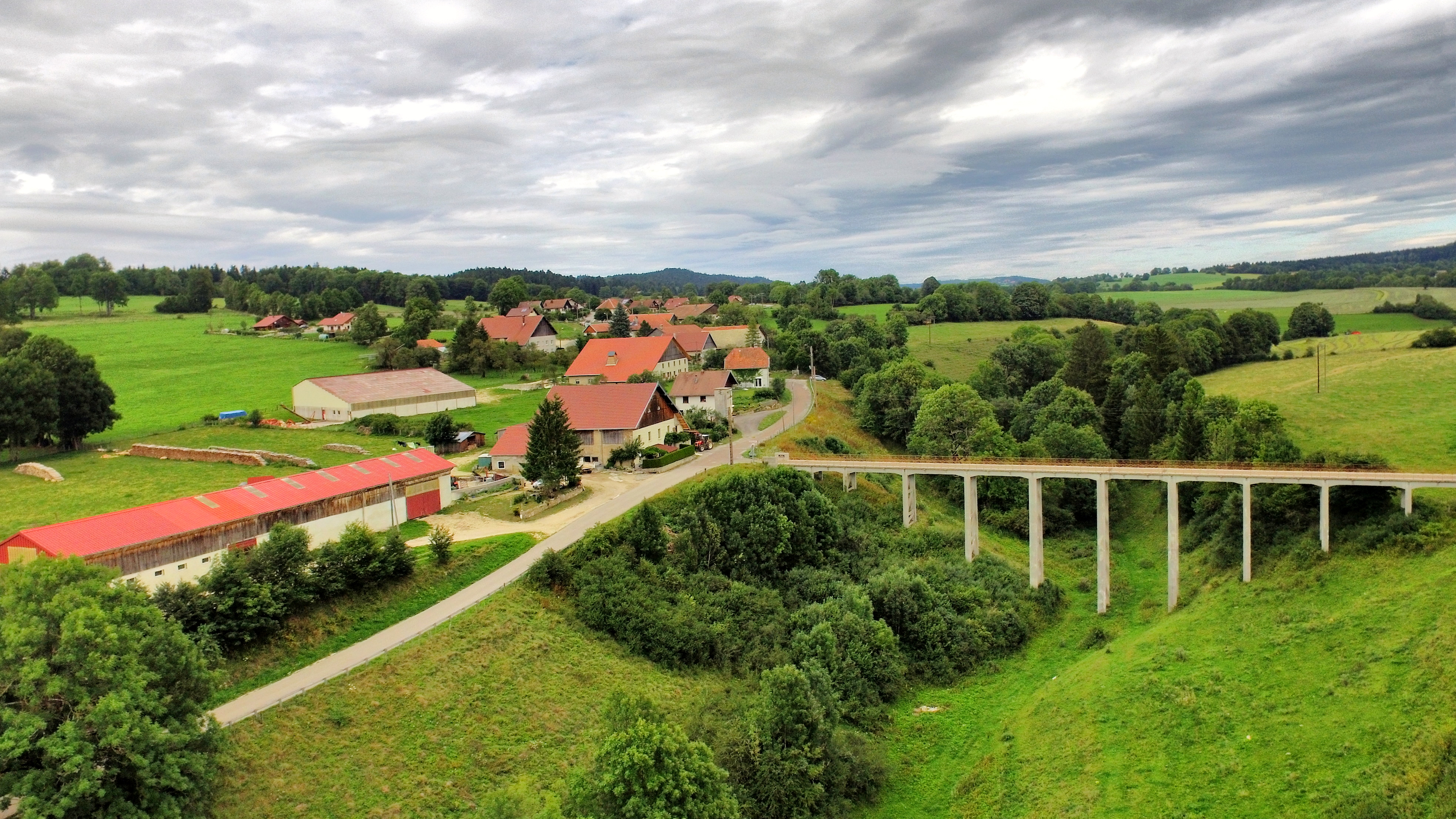
- The village and bridge
- Location of Montbéliardot
- Location within France Location within Bourgogne-Franche-Comté
- Coordinates: 47°10′34″N 6°39′18″E
- Country: France
- Region: Bourgogne-Franche-Comté
- Department: Doubs
- Arrondissement: Pontarlier
- Canton: Morteau
- Intercommunality: Plateau du Russey

Government
  - Mayor (2020–2026): Charles Gelion
- Area^{1}: 3.8 km^{2} (1.5 sq mi)
- Highest elevation: 941 m (3,087 ft)
- Lowest elevation: 760 m (2,490 ft)
- Population (2023): 114
  - Density: 30/km^{2} (78/sq mi)
- Time zone: UTC+01:00 (CET)
  - Summer (DST): UTC+02:00 (CEST)
- INSEE/Postal code: 25389 /25210
- ^{1} French Land Register data, which excludes lakes, ponds, glaciers > 1 km^{2} (0.386 sq mi or 247 acres) and river estuaries.

Montbéliardot (French pronunciation: [mɔ̃beljaʁdo]) is a commune in the Doubs department in the Bourgogne-Franche-Comté region in eastern France.

== Geography ==
The commune lies 8 km (5.0 mi) west of Le Russey.

== Population ==
Historical population
Year	Pop.	±% p.a.
1968	81	—
1975	62	−3.75%
1982	46	−4.17%
1990	55	+2.26%
1999	72	+3.04%
2007	87	+2.39%
2012	110	+4.80%
2017	114	+0.72%
2023	114	+0.00%
Source: INSEE

== See also ==
- Communes of the Doubs department
