= Saint-Julien-lès-Russey =

- Commune
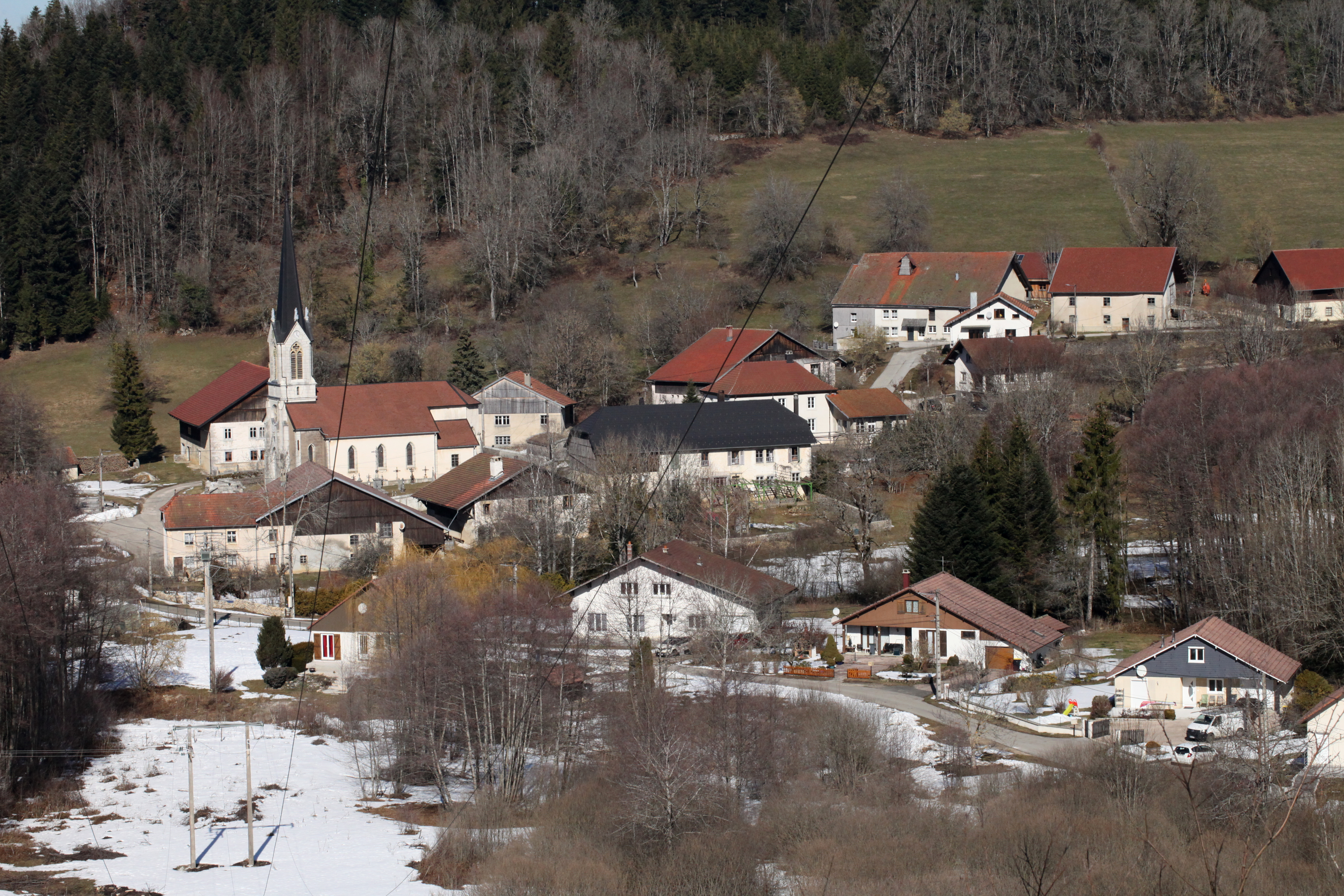
- A general view of Saint-Julien-lès-Russey
- Location of Saint-Julien-lès-Russey
- Location within France Location within Bourgogne-Franche-Comté
- Coordinates: 47°13′05″N 6°43′30″E
- Country: France
- Region: Bourgogne-Franche-Comté
- Department: Doubs
- Arrondissement: Pontarlier
- Canton: Morteau
- Intercommunality: Plateau du Russey

Government
  - Mayor (2020–2026): Pierre Burnequez
- Area^{1}: 10.01 km^{2} (3.86 sq mi)
- Highest elevation: 973 m (3,192 ft)
- Lowest elevation: 590 m (1,940 ft)
- Population (2023): 181
  - Density: 18.1/km^{2} (46.8/sq mi)
- Time zone: UTC+01:00 (CET)
  - Summer (DST): UTC+02:00 (CEST)
- INSEE/Postal code: 25522 /25210
- ^{1} French Land Register data, which excludes lakes, ponds, glaciers > 1 km^{2} (0.386 sq mi or 247 acres) and river estuaries.

Saint-Julien-lès-Russey (French pronunciation: [sɛ̃ ʒyljɛ̃ lɛ ʁysɛ], literally Saint-Julien near Russey) is a commune in the Doubs département in the Bourgogne-Franche-Comté region in eastern France.

== Geography ==
The commune lies 7 km (4.3 mi) from Le Russey.

== Population ==
Historical population
| Year | Pop. | ±% p.a. |
|---|---|---|
| 1968 | 142 | — |
| 1975 | 151 | +0.88% |
| 1982 | 143 | −0.77% |
| 1990 | 114 | −2.79% |
| 1999 | 112 | −0.20% |
| 2007 | 148 | +3.55% |
| 2012 | 146 | −0.27% |
| 2017 | 180 | +4.28% |
| 2023 | 181 | +0.09% |
Source: INSEE

== See also ==
- Le Russey
- Communes of the Doubs department
