= François-Joseph Servois =

French priest, military officer and mathematician

- Born: July 18, 1767; Mont-de-Laval, France
- Died: April 17, 1847 (aged 79); Mont-de-Laval, France

Philosophical work
- Region: Mathematics
- Main interests: Projective Geometry; Mechanics; Complex Numbers; Functional Equations; Calculus
- Notable ideas: Introduced the terms: Commutative; Distributive

François-Joseph Servois (French pronunciation: [fʁɑ̃swa ʒozɛf sɛʁvwa]; born 19 July 1767 in Mont-de-Laval, Doubs, France; died 17 April 1847 in Mont-de-Laval, Doubs, France) was a French priest, military officer and mathematician. His most notable contribution came in his publication of Essai sur un nouveau mode d’exposition des principes du calcul différentiel (Essay on a system of exposition of the principles of differential calculus) in 1814, where he first introduced the mathematical terms for commutative and distributive.

== Life ==
Servois was born on 18 July 1767 in Mont-de-Laval, France to Jacques-Ignace Servois, a local merchant, and Jeanne-Marie Jolliet. Not much is known about his early life except that he had at least one sibling, a sister with which he would eventually move in with after his retirement. He attended several religious schools in both Mont-de-Laval and Besançon with the intention of becoming a priest. He was ordained at Besançon near the beginning of the French Revolution. His life as a priest was short lived though. As tensions in France, prior to the French Revolution, began to escalate, he left the priesthood to join the French Army in 1793. He officially entered École d'Artillerie (Artillery School) at Châlons-sur-Marne on 5 March 1794, and was commissioned as Second Lieutenant in the First Foot Artillery Regiment by 13 November of that same year. During his time in the Army, Servois was actively involved in many battles, including the crossing of the Rhine, the Battle of Neuwied, and the Battle of Paris.

It was during his leisure time in the army that he began to seriously devote himself to the study of Mathematics. He suffered from poor health during his years as an officer and this led to him requesting a non-active military position as a professor of mathematics. He gained the attention of Adrien-Marie Legendre with some of his work and through Legendre's recommendation, he was assigned to his first academic position, as a professor at the École d'Artillerie in Besançon in July 1801. He would go on to teach at a number of different artillery schools through France, including ones in Châlons-sur-Marne (March 1802 - December 1802), Metz (December 1802 - February 1808, 1815–1816), and La Fère (February 1808 – 1814, 1814–1815).

== Work in mathematics ==
Like many of his colleagues who taught at the military schools in France, Servois closely followed the developments in mathematics and sought to make original contributions to the subject. Through his experience in the military, his first publication, Solutions peu connues de différents problèmes de géométrie pratique (Little-known Solutions to Various Problems in Practical Geometry), where he drew on notions of modern geometry and applied them to practical problems, was well received and prominent French mathematician, Jean-Victor Poncelet, considered it to be

"a truly original work, notable for presenting the first applications of theory of transversals to the geometry of the ruler or surveyor's staff, thus revealing the fruitfulness and utility of this theory"

Servois presented several memoirs to the Académie des Sciences at this time including one on the principles of differential calculus and the development of functions in series. He would further publish papers to the Annales de mathématiques pures et appliquées, where his friend, Joseph Diaz Gergonne was the editor, where he started to formalize his position on the foundations of calculus. As a disciple of Joseph-Louis Lagrange, he strongly believed that structure of calculus should be based on power series as opposed to limits or infinitesimals.

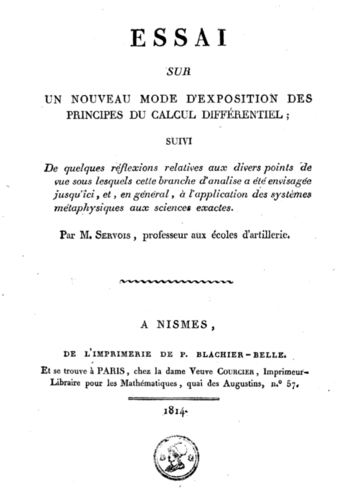
Frontpage of Servois' Essai (1814)

In late 1814, he consolidated his ideas on an algebraic formalization of calculus in his most celebrated work, Essai sur un nouveau mode d'exposition des principes du calcul différential (Essay on a New Method of Exposition of the Principles of Differential Calculus). It was in this paper, when considering abstract functional equations of differential calculus, that he proposed the terms "commutative" and "distributive" to describe properties of functions.

Servois' 1814 Essai was published well before the modern definitions of functions, identities and inverses, so in his paper, he attempted to formalize these ideas by defining their behavior. In many occasions throughout the document, he discusses operations on functions to not only describe ordinary functions of an independent variable but also to describe operators, such as difference and differential operators. It is here where we first see a formal definition of the distributive property. Servois asserts the following statement:

Let $\phi (x+y+...)=\phi (x)+\phi (y)+...$

"Functions which, like $\phi$, are such that the function of the (algebraic) sum of any number of quantities is equal to the sum of the same function of each of these quantities, are called distributive"

He goes on to further describe the commutative function as follows:

Let f$fz$=$f$f$z$

"Functions, which like f and $f$, are such that they give identical results, no matter in which order we apply them to the subject, are called commutative between themselves."

== Retirement and recognition ==
Servois went on to publish two more articles in the Annales des mathématiques pures et appliquées, but they were far less influential than his previous papers. He was assigned to his final position as the curator of the Artillery Museum in Paris on 2 May 1817, where he stayed until 1 June 1827. During his time as the curator, Servois was made a Knight of Saint-Louis for distinguished service to the military on 17 August 1822.

After his retirement, he returned to his hometown of Mont-de-Laval and resided with his sister and his two nieces until his death on 17 April 1847 at the age of 79.
