= Noël-Cerneux =

- Commune
- The centre of the village
- Location of Noël-Cerneux
- Location within France Location within Bourgogne-Franche-Comté
- Coordinates: 47°06′07″N 6°39′52″E
- Country: France
- Region: Bourgogne-Franche-Comté
- Department: Doubs
- Arrondissement: Pontarlier
- Canton: Morteau
- Intercommunality: Plateau du Russey

Government
  - Mayor (2020–2026): Corinne Paratte
- Area^{1}: 6.36 km^{2} (2.46 sq mi)
- Highest elevation: 1,082 m (3,550 ft)
- Lowest elevation: 888 m (2,913 ft)
- Population (2023): 453
  - Density: 71.2/km^{2} (184/sq mi)
- Time zone: UTC+01:00 (CET)
  - Summer (DST): UTC+02:00 (CEST)
- INSEE/Postal code: 25425 /25500
- ^{1} French Land Register data, which excludes lakes, ponds, glaciers > 1 km^{2} (0.386 sq mi or 247 acres) and river estuaries.

Noël-Cerneux (French pronunciation: [nɔɛl sɛʁnø]) is a commune in the Doubs department in the Bourgogne-Franche-Comté region in eastern France.

== Geography ==
The commune lies 10 km (6.2 mi) southwest of Le Russey near Morteau.

== Population ==
Historical population
Year	Pop.	±% p.a.
1968	139	—
1975	146	+0.70%
1982	190	+3.83%
1990	243	+3.12%
1999	295	+2.18%
2007	335	+1.60%
2012	385	+2.82%
2017	433	+2.38%
2023	453	+0.76%
Source: INSEE

== See also ==
- Communes of the Doubs department
