= Congregation of Christian Retreat =

- Formation: November 19, 1789; 236 years ago
- Founder: Fr. Antoine-Sylvestre Receveur
- Type: Roman Catholic religious institute
- Region served: Europe, Benin

Congregation of Christian Retreat is the name of two Roman Catholic religious institutes, one of priests and one of nuns.

== Communities ==
=== Priests ===
- France: Les Fontenelles, Chusclan, Abundance
- Switzerland: Montbarry
- Belgium
- England
- Scotland
- Ireland

=== Sisters ===
- France: Les Fontenelles
- Benin: Kandi, Banikoara
