= Mont-de-Laval =

- Commune
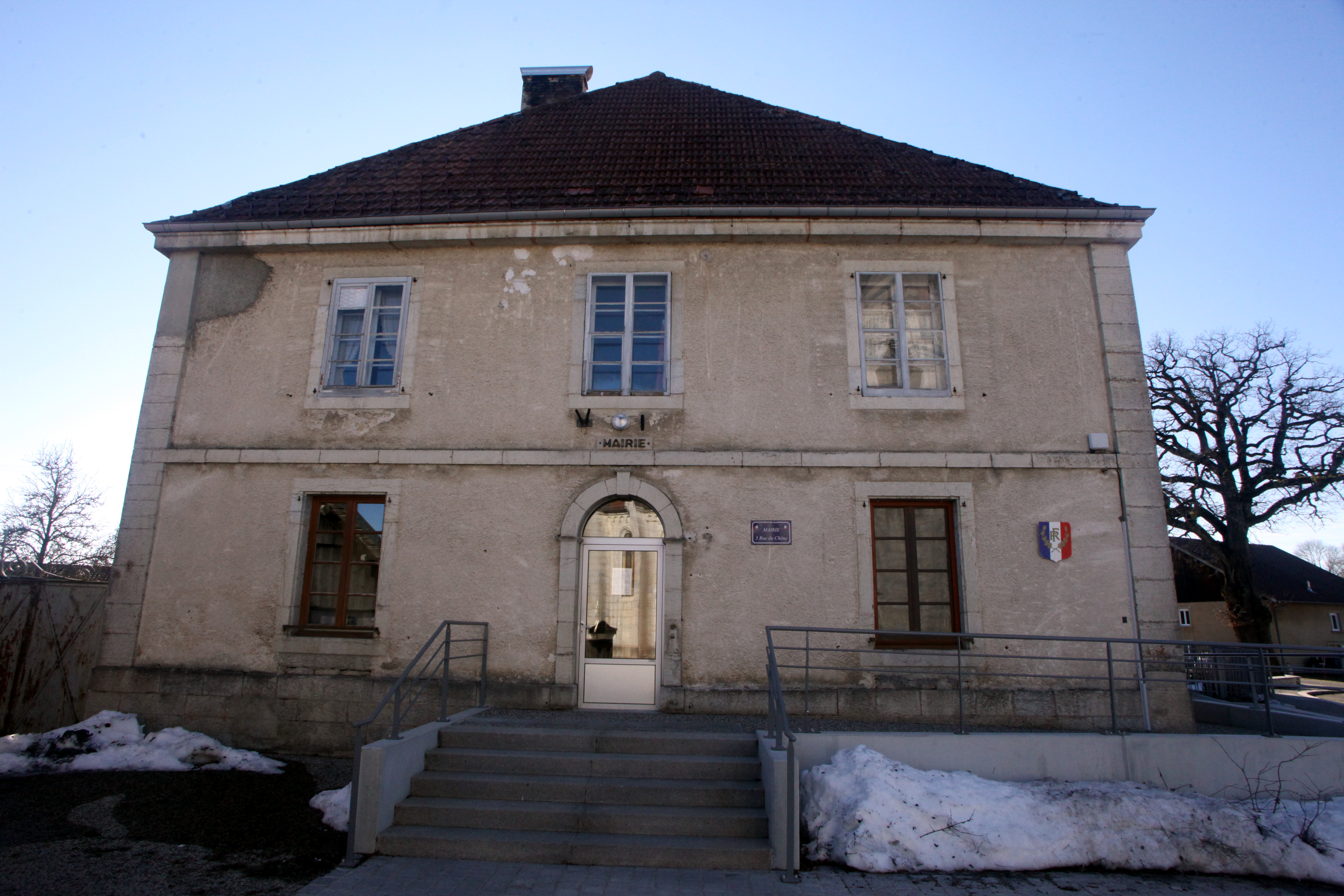
- The town hall in Mont-de-Laval
- Location of Mont-de-Laval
- Location within France Location within Bourgogne-Franche-Comté
- Coordinates: 47°10′14″N 6°37′43″E
- Country: France
- Region: Bourgogne-Franche-Comté
- Department: Doubs
- Arrondissement: Pontarlier
- Canton: Morteau
- Intercommunality: Plateau du Russey

Government
  - Mayor (2020–2026): Jocelyne Ernst
- Area^{1}: 8.44 km^{2} (3.26 sq mi)
- Highest elevation: 1,050 m (3,440 ft)
- Lowest elevation: 570 m (1,870 ft)
- Population (2023): 194
  - Density: 23.0/km^{2} (59.5/sq mi)
- Time zone: UTC+01:00 (CET)
  - Summer (DST): UTC+02:00 (CEST)
- INSEE/Postal code: 25391 /25210
- ^{1} French Land Register data, which excludes lakes, ponds, glaciers > 1 km^{2} (0.386 sq mi or 247 acres) and river estuaries.

Mont-de-Laval (French pronunciation: [mɔ̃ də laval]) is a commune in the Doubs department in the Bourgogne-Franche-Comté region in eastern France.

== Geography ==
The commune lies 12 km (7.5 mi) west of Le Russey.

== Population ==
Historical population
Year	Pop.	±% p.a.
1968	174	—
1975	187	+1.03%
1982	171	−1.27%
1990	161	−0.75%
1999	137	−1.78%
2007	176	+3.18%
2012	183	+0.78%
2017	177	−0.66%
2023	194	+1.54%
Source: INSEE

== See also ==
- Communes of the Doubs department
