= Les Gras =

- Commune
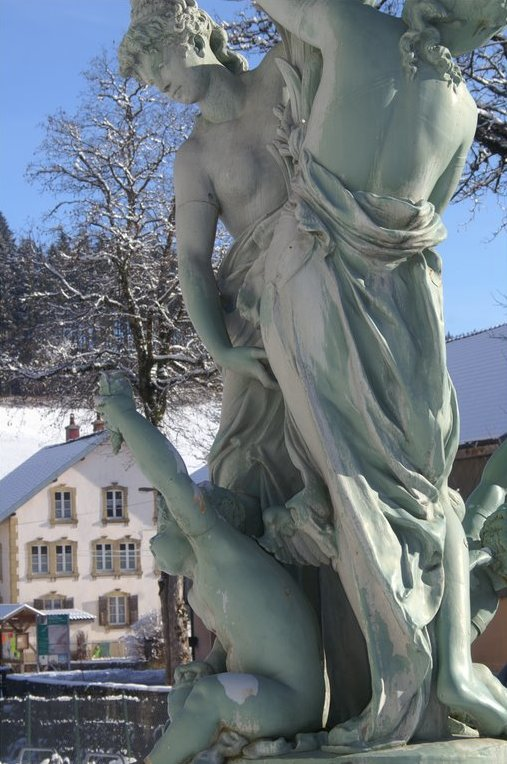
- Fountain
- Location of Les Gras
- Location within France Location within Bourgogne-Franche-Comté
- Coordinates: 46°59′42″N 6°32′42″E
- Country: France
- Region: Bourgogne-Franche-Comté
- Department: Doubs
- Arrondissement: Pontarlier
- Canton: Morteau
- Intercommunality: Val de Morteau

Government
  - Mayor (2020–2026): Bernard Jacquet
- Area^{1}: 14.99 km^{2} (5.79 sq mi)
- Highest elevation: 1,290 m (4,230 ft)
- Lowest elevation: 782 m (2,566 ft)
- Population (2023): 817
  - Density: 54.5/km^{2} (141/sq mi)
- Time zone: UTC+01:00 (CET)
  - Summer (DST): UTC+02:00 (CEST)
- INSEE/Postal code: 25296 /25790
- ^{1} French Land Register data, which excludes lakes, ponds, glaciers > 1 km^{2} (0.386 sq mi or 247 acres) and river estuaries.

Les Gras (French pronunciation: [le ɡʁa]) is a commune in the Doubs department in the Bourgogne-Franche-Comté region in eastern France.

== Population ==
Historical population
Year	Pop.	±% p.a.
1968	727	—
1975	649	−1.61%
1982	585	−1.47%
1990	601	+0.34%
1999	654	+0.94%
2007	730	+1.38%
2012	784	+1.44%
2017	797	+0.33%
2023	817	+0.41%
Source: INSEE

== See also ==
- Communes of the Doubs department
