= La Bosse, Doubs =

La Bosse
- Commune
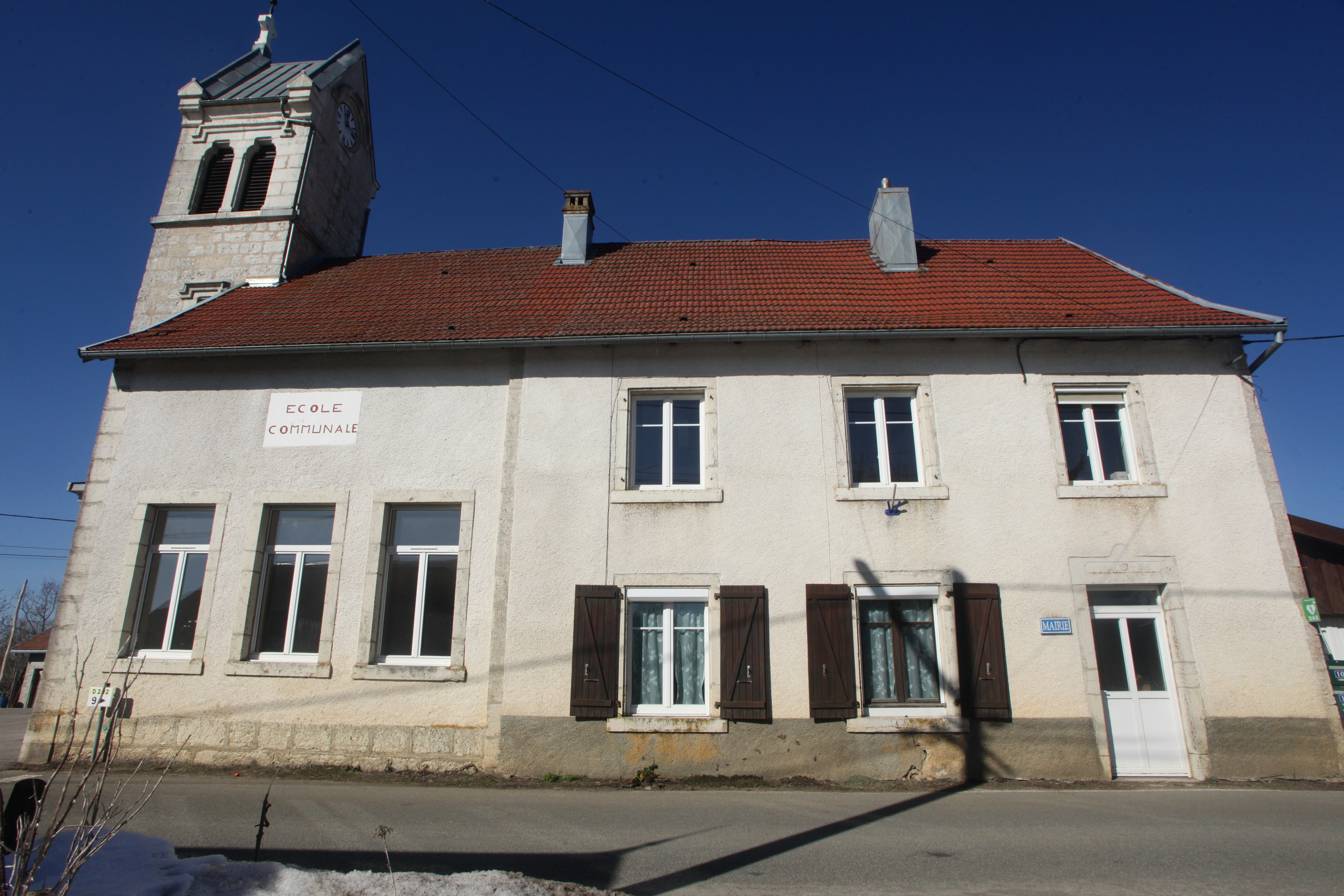
- The town hall and school in La Bosse
- Location of La Bosse
- Location within France Location within Bourgogne-Franche-Comté
- Coordinates: 47°08′20″N 6°39′03″E
- Country: France
- Region: Bourgogne-Franche-Comté
- Department: Doubs
- Arrondissement: Pontarlier
- Canton: Morteau
- Intercommunality: Plateau de Russey

Government
  - Mayor (2020–2026): Bernard Pretot
- Area^{1}: 5.13 km^{2} (1.98 sq mi)
- Elevation: 1,040 m (3,410 ft)
- Highest elevation: 1,052 m (3,451 ft)
- Lowest elevation: 889 m (2,917 ft)
- Population (2023): 91
  - Density: 18/km^{2} (46/sq mi)
- Time zone: UTC+01:00 (CET)
  - Summer (DST): UTC+02:00 (CEST)
- INSEE/Postal code: 25077 /25210
- ^{1} French Land Register data, which excludes lakes, ponds, glaciers > 1 km^{2} (0.386 sq mi or 247 acres) and river estuaries.

La Bosse (French pronunciation: [la bɔs]) is a commune in the Doubs department in the Bourgogne-Franche-Comté region in eastern France.

== Population ==
Historical population
Year	Pop.	±% p.a.
1968	59	—
1975	48	−2.90%
1982	55	+1.96%
1990	46	−2.21%
1999	66	+4.09%
2007	77	+1.95%
2012	78	+0.26%
2017	74	−1.05%
2023	91	+3.51%
Source: INSEE

The inhabitants are called Bossets in French.

== See also ==
- Communes of the Doubs department
