= Bonnétage =

- Commune
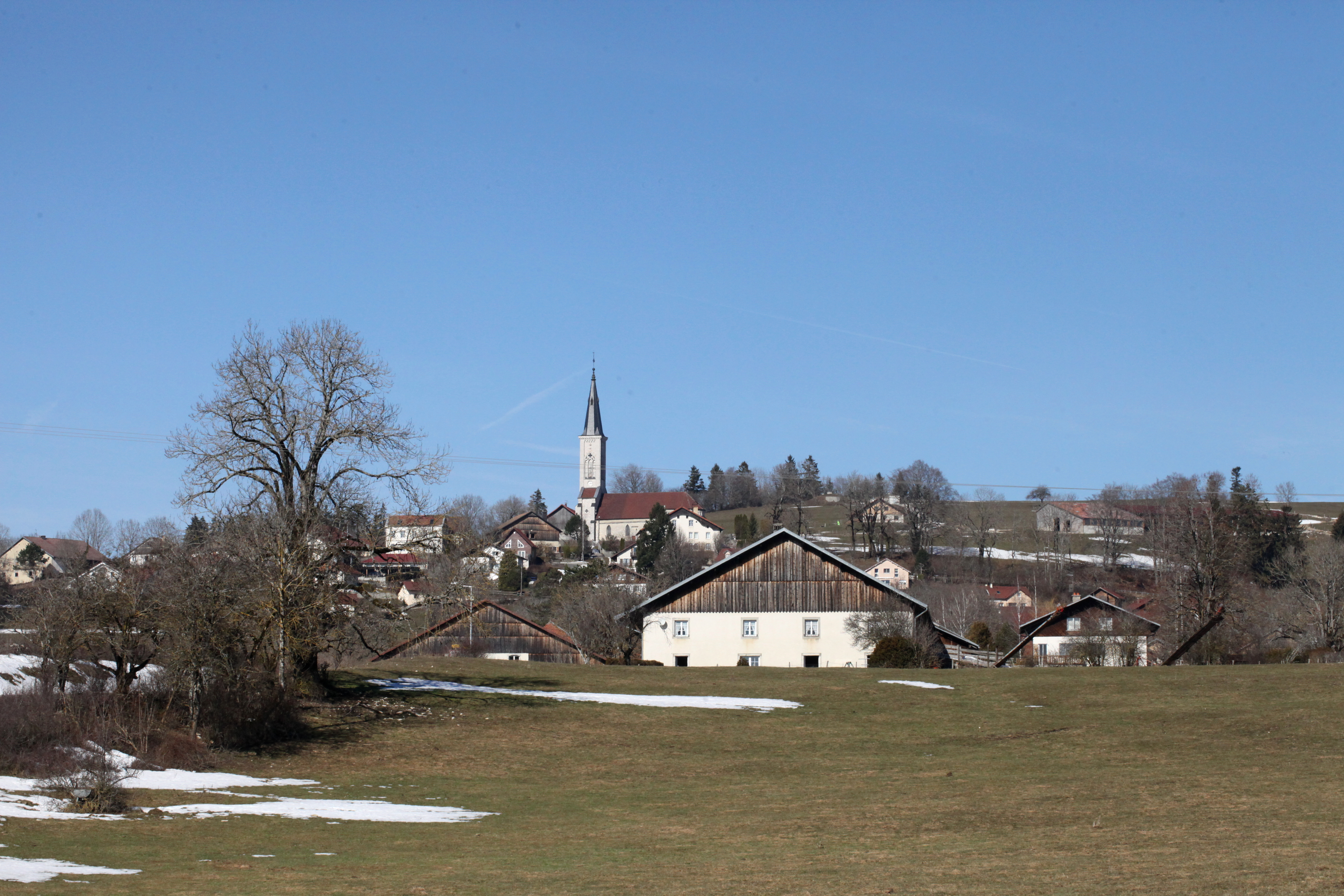
- A general view of Bonnétage
- Location of Bonnétage
- Location within France Location within Bourgogne-Franche-Comté
- Coordinates: 47°11′07″N 6°43′27″E
- Country: France
- Region: Bourgogne-Franche-Comté
- Department: Doubs
- Arrondissement: Pontarlier
- Canton: Morteau
- Intercommunality: Plateau du Russey

Government
  - Mayor (2020–2026): Valérie Pagnot
- Area^{1}: 17.71 km^{2} (6.84 sq mi)
- Highest elevation: 1,045 m (3,428 ft)
- Lowest elevation: 615 m (2,018 ft)
- Population (2023): 987
  - Density: 55.7/km^{2} (144/sq mi)
- Time zone: UTC+01:00 (CET)
  - Summer (DST): UTC+02:00 (CEST)
- INSEE/Postal code: 25074 /25210
- ^{1} French Land Register data, which excludes lakes, ponds, glaciers > 1 km^{2} (0.386 sq mi or 247 acres) and river estuaries.

Bonnétage (French pronunciation: [bɔnetaʒ]) is a commune in the Doubs department in the Bourgogne-Franche-Comté region in eastern France.

== Population ==
Historical population
Year	Pop.	±% p.a.
1968	604	—
1975	642	+0.88%
1982	640	−0.04%
1990	657	+0.33%
1999	674	+0.28%
2007	749	+1.33%
2012	822	+1.88%
2017	917	+2.21%
2023	987	+1.23%
Source: INSEE

== See also ==
- Communes of the Doubs department
