= Les Combes =

- Commune
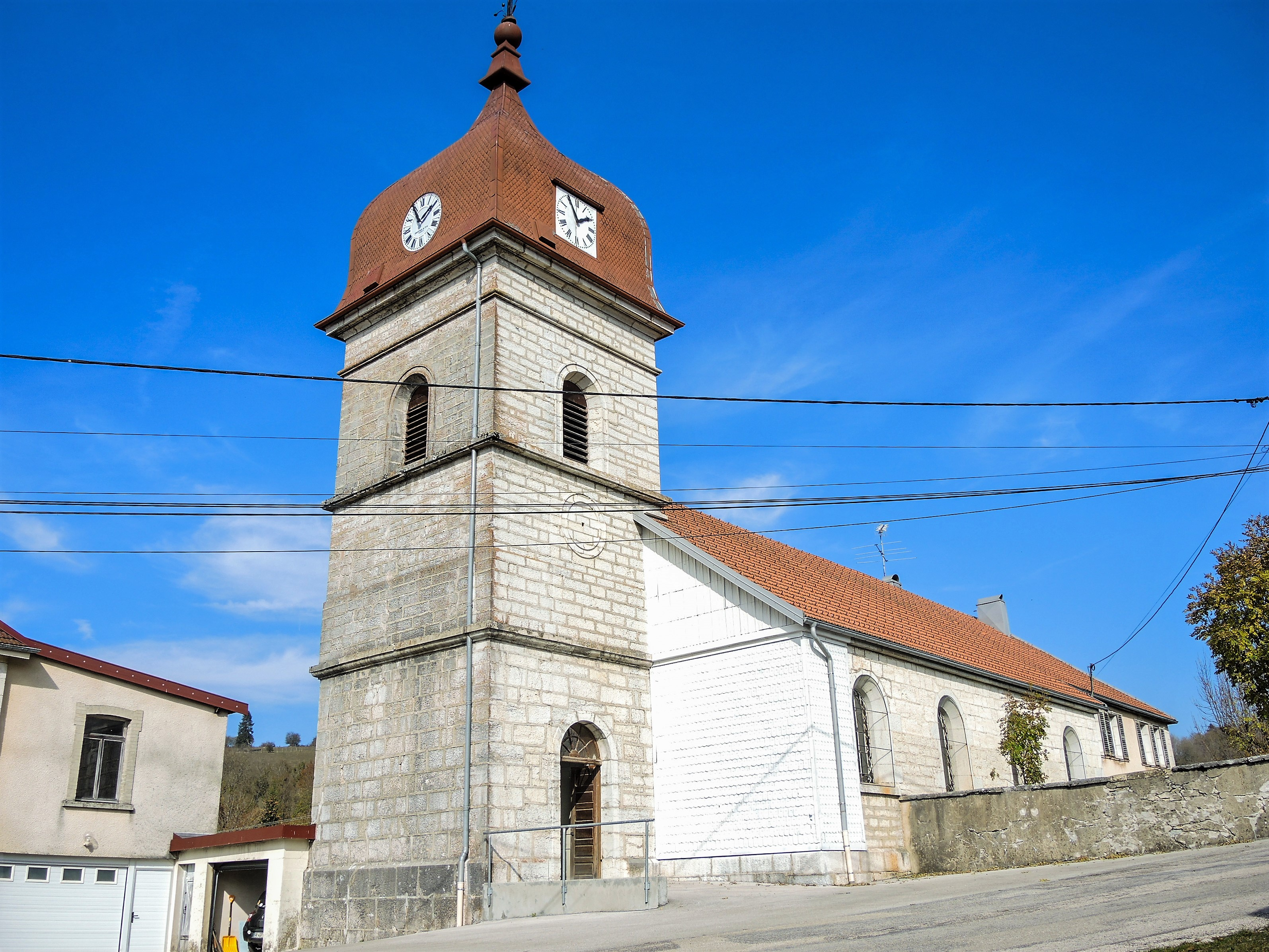
- The church of Remonot in Les Combes

- Coat of arms
- Location of Les Combes
- Location within France Location within Bourgogne-Franche-Comté
- Coordinates: 47°03′36″N 6°32′43″E
- Country: France
- Region: Bourgogne-Franche-Comté
- Department: Doubs
- Arrondissement: Pontarlier
- Canton: Morteau
- Intercommunality: Val de Morteau

Government
  - Mayor (2020–2026): Jean-Louis Mougin
- Area^{1}: 17.58 km^{2} (6.79 sq mi)
- Highest elevation: 1,029 m (3,376 ft)
- Lowest elevation: 754 m (2,474 ft)
- Population (2023): 777
  - Density: 44.2/km^{2} (114/sq mi)
- Time zone: UTC+01:00 (CET)
  - Summer (DST): UTC+02:00 (CEST)
- INSEE/Postal code: 25160 /25500
- ^{1} French Land Register data, which excludes lakes, ponds, glaciers > 1 km^{2} (0.386 sq mi or 247 acres) and river estuaries.

Les Combes (French pronunciation: [le kɔ̃b]) is a commune in the Doubs department in the Bourgogne-Franche-Comté region in eastern France.

== Population ==
Historical population
Year	Pop.	±% p.a.
1968	398	—
1975	389	−0.33%
1982	393	+0.15%
1990	508	+3.26%
1999	598	+1.83%
2007	692	+1.84%
2012	731	+1.10%
2017	737	+0.16%
2023	777	+0.88%
Source: INSEE

== See also ==
- Communes of the Doubs department
