= Narbief =

- Commune
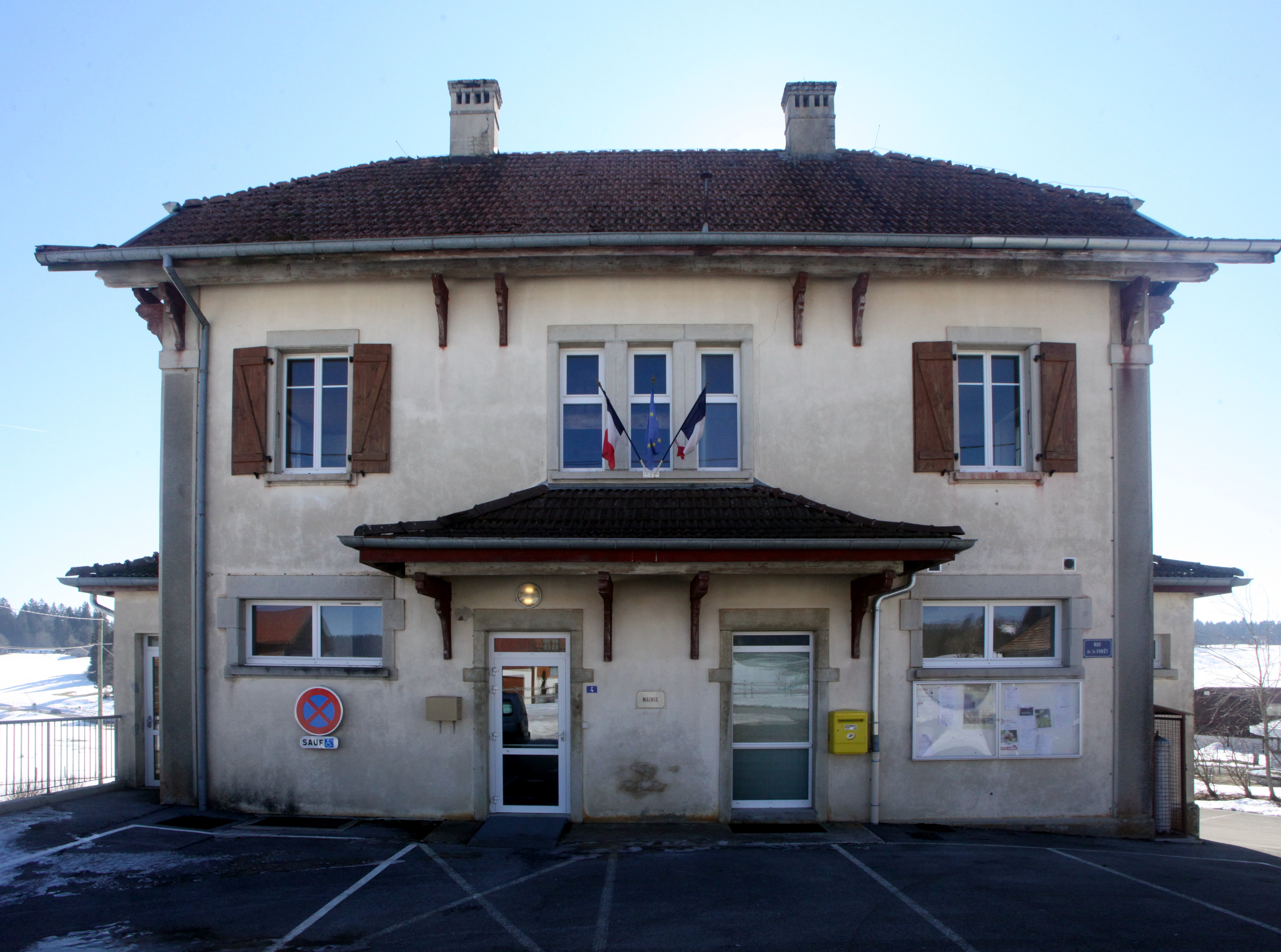
- The town hall in Narbief
- Location of Narbief
- Location within France Location within Bourgogne-Franche-Comté
- Coordinates: 47°08′00″N 6°42′00″E
- Country: France
- Region: Bourgogne-Franche-Comté
- Department: Doubs
- Arrondissement: Pontarlier
- Canton: Morteau
- Intercommunality: Plateau du Russey

Government
  - Mayor (2020–2026): Jérôme Renaud
- Area^{1}: 3.47 km^{2} (1.34 sq mi)
- Highest elevation: 935 m (3,068 ft)
- Lowest elevation: 879 m (2,884 ft)
- Population (2023): 109
  - Density: 31.4/km^{2} (81.4/sq mi)
- Time zone: UTC+01:00 (CET)
  - Summer (DST): UTC+02:00 (CEST)
- INSEE/Postal code: 25421 /25210
- ^{1} French Land Register data, which excludes lakes, ponds, glaciers > 1 km^{2} (0.386 sq mi or 247 acres) and river estuaries.

Narbief is a commune in the Doubs department in the Bourgogne-Franche-Comté region in eastern France.

== Population ==
Historical population
Year	Pop.	±% p.a.
1968	60	—
1975	66	+1.37%
1982	58	−1.83%
1990	55	−0.66%
1999	70	+2.72%
2007	69	−0.18%
2012	67	−0.59%
2017	69	+0.59%
2023	109	+7.92%
Source: INSEE

== See also ==
- Communes of the Doubs department
