= Le Bélieu =

- Commune
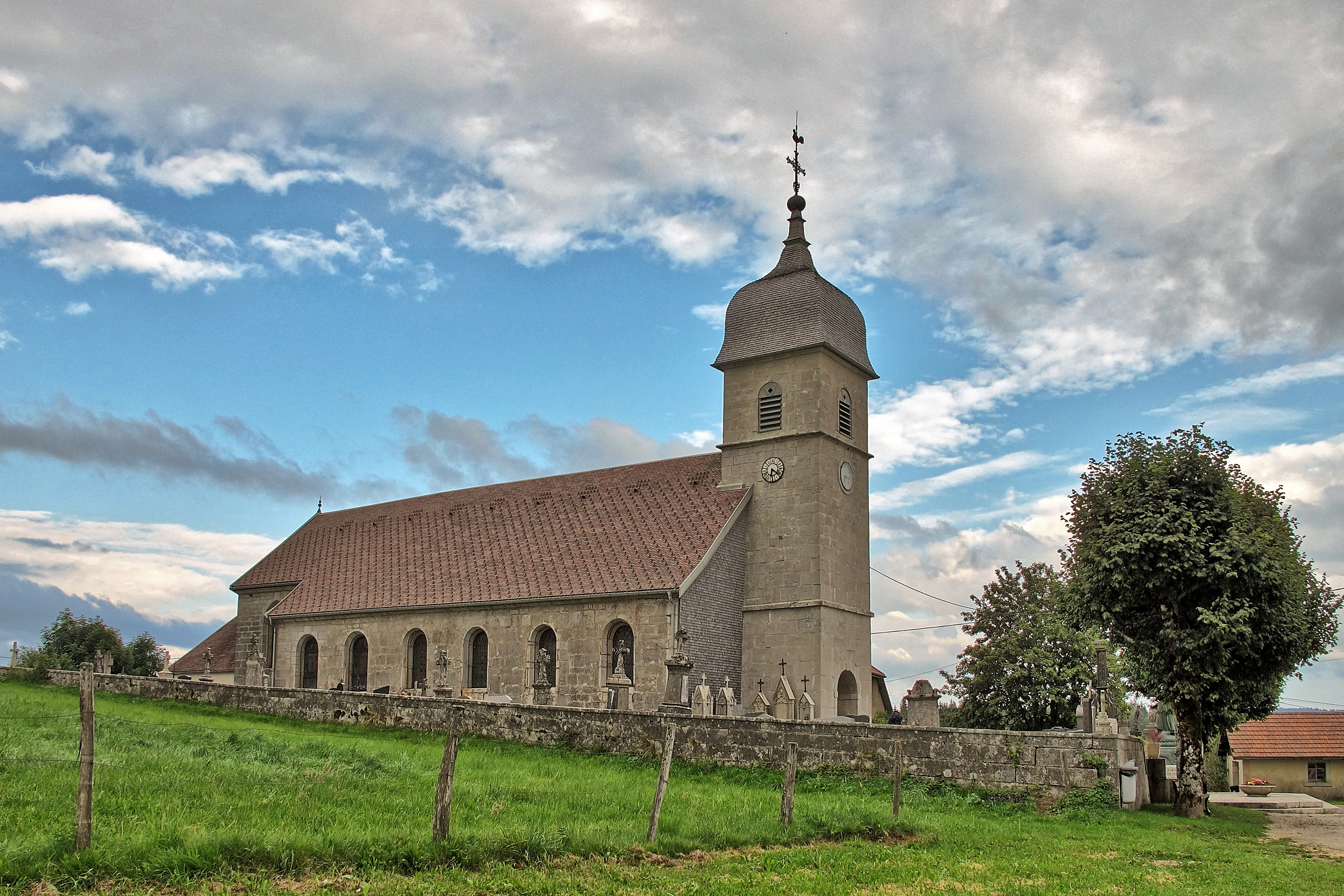
- The church in Le Bélieu
- Location of Le Bélieu
- Location within France Location within Bourgogne-Franche-Comté
- Coordinates: 47°07′12″N 6°38′08″E
- Country: France
- Region: Bourgogne-Franche-Comté
- Department: Doubs
- Arrondissement: Pontarlier
- Canton: Morteau
- Intercommunality: Val de Morteau

Government
  - Mayor (2020–2026): Jean-Noël Cuenot
- Area^{1}: 10.72 km^{2} (4.14 sq mi)
- Highest elevation: 1,040 m (3,410 ft)
- Lowest elevation: 870 m (2,850 ft)
- Population (2023): 512
  - Density: 47.8/km^{2} (124/sq mi)
- Time zone: UTC+01:00 (CET)
  - Summer (DST): UTC+02:00 (CEST)
- INSEE/Postal code: 25050 /25500
- ^{1} French Land Register data, which excludes lakes, ponds, glaciers > 1 km^{2} (0.386 sq mi or 247 acres) and river estuaries.

Le Bélieu (French pronunciation: [lə beljø]) is a commune in the Doubs department in the Bourgogne-Franche-Comté region in eastern France.

== Population ==
Historical population
Year	Pop.	±% p.a.
1968	201	—
1975	174	−2.04%
1982	212	+2.86%
1990	249	+2.03%
1999	272	+0.99%
2007	300	+1.23%
2012	346	+2.89%
2017	450	+5.40%
2023	512	+2.17%
Source: INSEE

== See also ==
- Communes of the Doubs department
