= Les Fontenelles =

- Commune
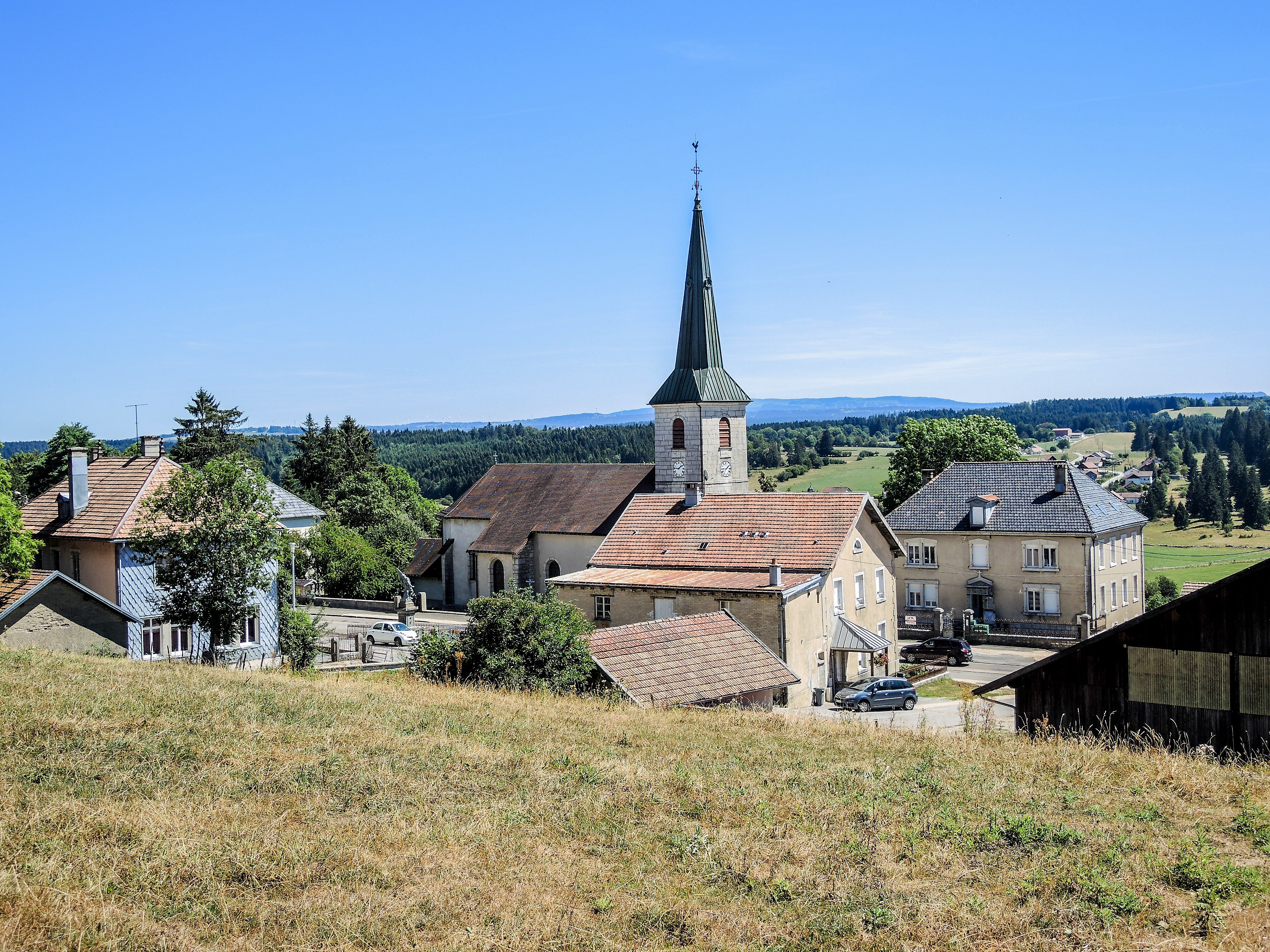
- The center and church of Les Fontenelles
- Location of Les Fontenelles
- Location within France Location within Bourgogne-Franche-Comté
- Coordinates: 47°12′01″N 6°44′40″E
- Country: France
- Region: Bourgogne-Franche-Comté
- Department: Doubs
- Arrondissement: Pontarlier
- Canton: Morteau
- Intercommunality: Plateau du Russey

Government
  - Mayor (2020–2026): Éric Clémence
- Area^{1}: 8.38 km^{2} (3.24 sq mi)
- Highest elevation: 960 m (3,150 ft)
- Lowest elevation: 860 m (2,820 ft)
- Population (2023): 537
  - Density: 64.1/km^{2} (166/sq mi)
- Time zone: UTC+01:00 (CET)
  - Summer (DST): UTC+02:00 (CEST)
- INSEE/Postal code: 25248 /25210
- ^{1} French Land Register data, which excludes lakes, ponds, glaciers > 1 km^{2} (0.386 sq mi or 247 acres) and river estuaries.

Les Fontenelles (French pronunciation: [le fɔ̃tnɛl]) is a commune in the Doubs department in the Bourgogne-Franche-Comté region in eastern France.

== Population ==
Historical population
Year	Pop.	±% p.a.
1968	403	—
1975	381	−0.80%
1982	383	+0.07%
1990	417	+1.07%
1999	438	+0.55%
2007	493	+1.49%
2012	555	+2.40%
2017	568	+0.46%
2023	537	−0.93%
Source: INSEE

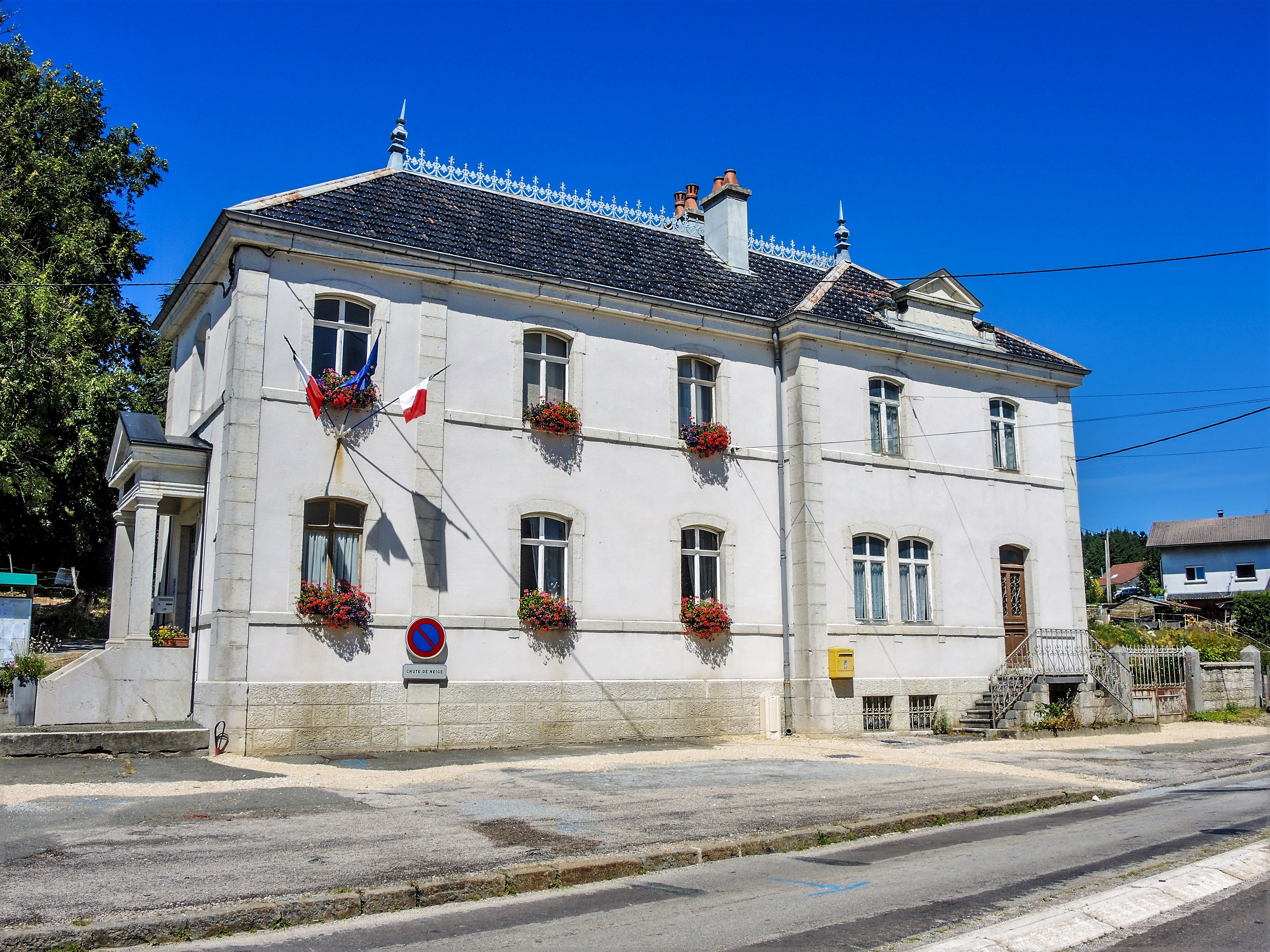
Townhall

== See also ==
- Communes of the Doubs department
- Congregation of Christian Retreat
