= Grand'Combe-des-Bois =

- Commune
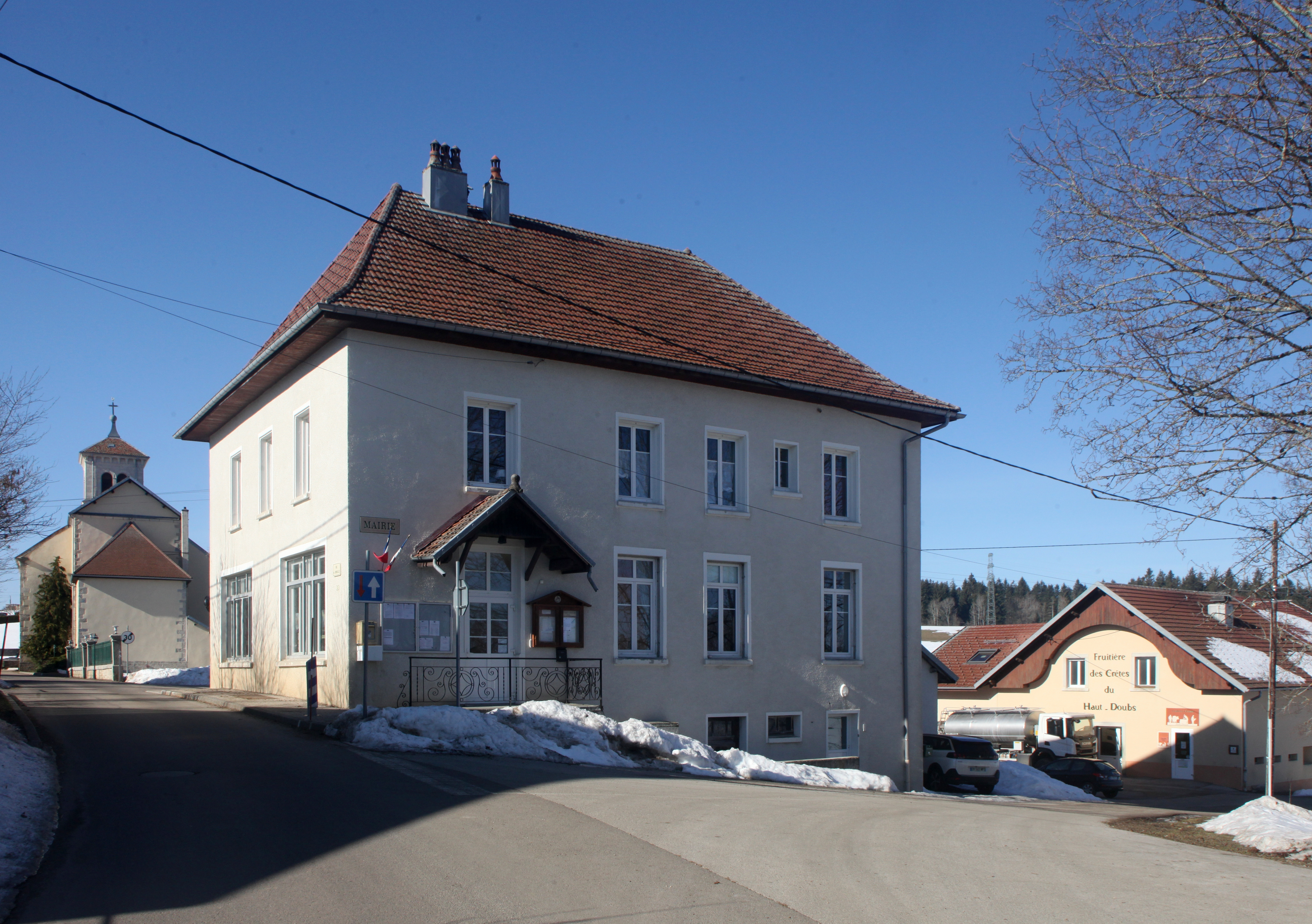
- The town hall in Grand'Combe-des-Bois

- Coat of arms
- Location of Grand'Combe-des-Bois
- Location within France Location within Bourgogne-Franche-Comté
- Coordinates: 47°08′19″N 6°47′30″E
- Country: France
- Region: Bourgogne-Franche-Comté
- Department: Doubs
- Arrondissement: Pontarlier
- Canton: Morteau
- Intercommunality: Plateau du Russey

Government
  - Mayor (2020–2026): Denis Leroux
- Area^{1}: 11.87 km^{2} (4.58 sq mi)
- Highest elevation: 1,087 m (3,566 ft)
- Lowest elevation: 615 m (2,018 ft)
- Population (2023): 125
  - Density: 10.5/km^{2} (27.3/sq mi)
- Time zone: UTC+01:00 (CET)
  - Summer (DST): UTC+02:00 (CEST)
- INSEE/Postal code: 25286 /25210
- ^{1} French Land Register data, which excludes lakes, ponds, glaciers > 1 km^{2} (0.386 sq mi or 247 acres) and river estuaries.

Grand'Combe-des-Bois is a commune in the Doubs department in the Bourgogne-Franche-Comté region in eastern France.

== Population ==
Historical population
Year	Pop.	±% p.a.
1968	150	—
1975	128	−2.24%
1982	100	−3.47%
1990	75	−3.53%
1999	87	+1.66%
2007	107	+2.62%
2012	133	+4.45%
2017	133	+0.00%
2023	125	−1.03%
Source: INSEE

== See also ==
- Communes of the Doubs department
