= La Chenalotte =

- Commune
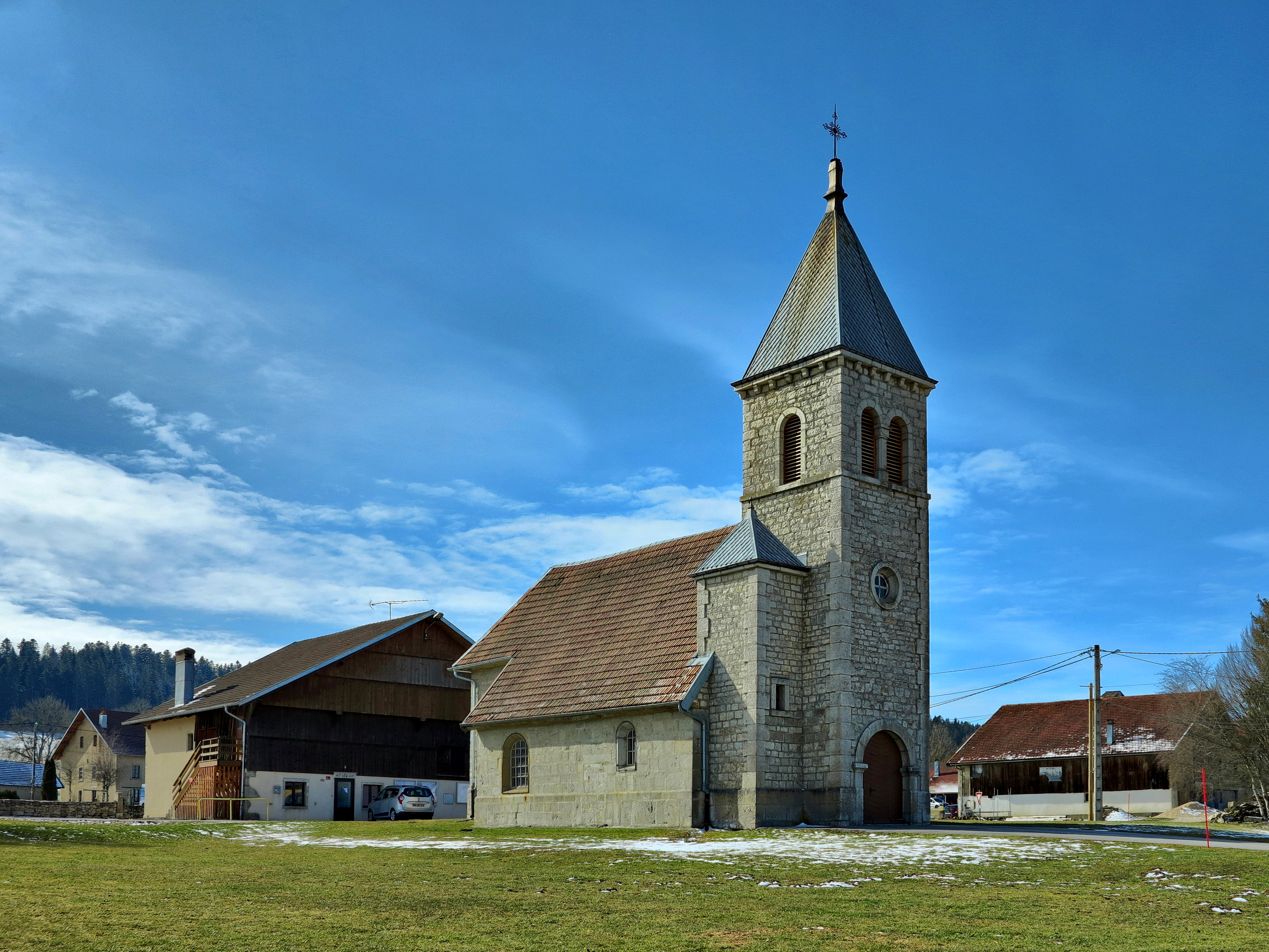
- The church in La Chenalotte
- Location of La Chenalotte
- Location within France Location within Bourgogne-Franche-Comté
- Coordinates: 47°06′34″N 6°41′05″E
- Country: France
- Region: Bourgogne-Franche-Comté
- Department: Doubs
- Arrondissement: Pontarlier
- Canton: Morteau
- Intercommunality: Plateau du Russey

Government
  - Mayor (2023–2026): Dimitri Coulouvrat
- Area^{1}: 4.88 km^{2} (1.88 sq mi)
- Highest elevation: 1,092 m (3,583 ft)
- Lowest elevation: 888 m (2,913 ft)
- Population (2023): 549
  - Density: 113/km^{2} (291/sq mi)
- Time zone: UTC+01:00 (CET)
  - Summer (DST): UTC+02:00 (CEST)
- INSEE/Postal code: 25148 /25500
- ^{1} French Land Register data, which excludes lakes, ponds, glaciers > 1 km^{2} (0.386 sq mi or 247 acres) and river estuaries.

La Chenalotte (French pronunciation: [la ʃənalɔt]) is a commune in the Doubs department in the Bourgogne-Franche-Comté region in eastern France.

== Population ==
Historical population
Year	Pop.	±% p.a.
1968	95	—
1975	77	−2.96%
1982	108	+4.95%
1990	198	+7.87%
1999	286	+4.17%
2007	366	+3.13%
2012	456	+4.50%
2017	499	+1.82%
2023	549	+1.60%
Source: INSEE

== See also ==
- Communes of the Doubs department
