= Laval-le-Prieuré =

- Commune
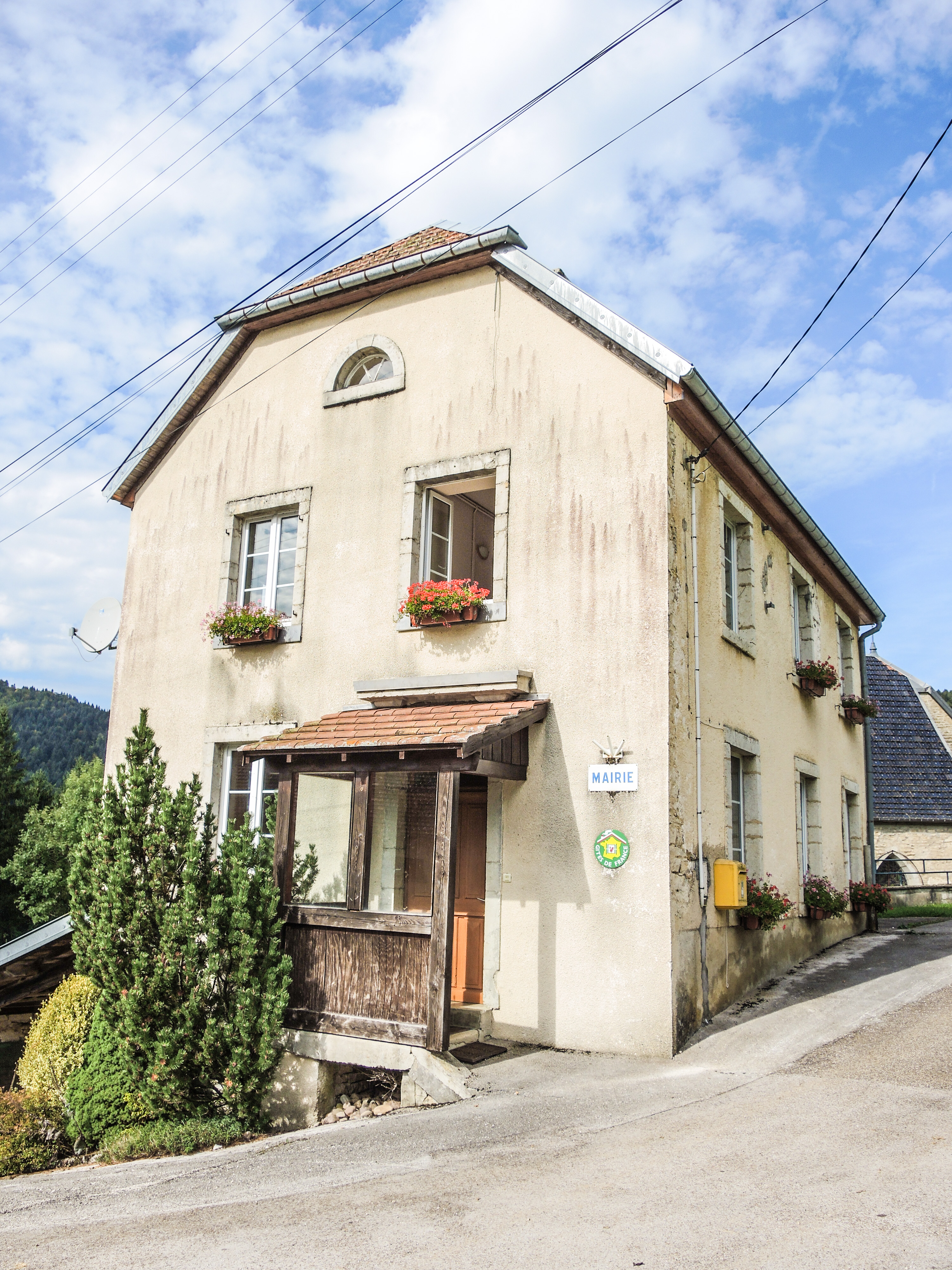
- The town hall in Laval-le-Prieuré
- Location of Laval-le-Prieuré
- Location within France Location within Bourgogne-Franche-Comté
- Coordinates: 47°10′56″N 6°37′19″E
- Country: France
- Region: Bourgogne-Franche-Comté
- Department: Doubs
- Arrondissement: Pontarlier
- Canton: Morteau
- Intercommunality: Plateau du Russey

Government
  - Mayor (2020–2026): Jean-Luc Vuillemin
- Area^{1}: 5.29 km^{2} (2.04 sq mi)
- Highest elevation: 820 m (2,690 ft)
- Lowest elevation: 460 m (1,510 ft)
- Population (2023): 32
  - Density: 6.0/km^{2} (16/sq mi)
- Time zone: UTC+01:00 (CET)
  - Summer (DST): UTC+02:00 (CEST)
- INSEE/Postal code: 25329 /25210
- ^{1} French Land Register data, which excludes lakes, ponds, glaciers > 1 km^{2} (0.386 sq mi or 247 acres) and river estuaries.

Laval-le-Prieuré (French pronunciation: [laval lə pʁijœʁe]) is a commune in the Doubs department in the Bourgogne-Franche-Comté region in eastern France.

== Population ==
Historical population
Year	Pop.	±% p.a.
1968	58	—
1975	62	+0.96%
1982	48	−3.59%
1990	35	−3.87%
1999	35	+0.00%
2007	34	−0.36%
2012	34	+0.00%
2017	35	+0.58%
2023	32	−1.48%
Source: INSEE

== See also ==
- Communes of the Doubs department
