= Le Bizot =

- Commune
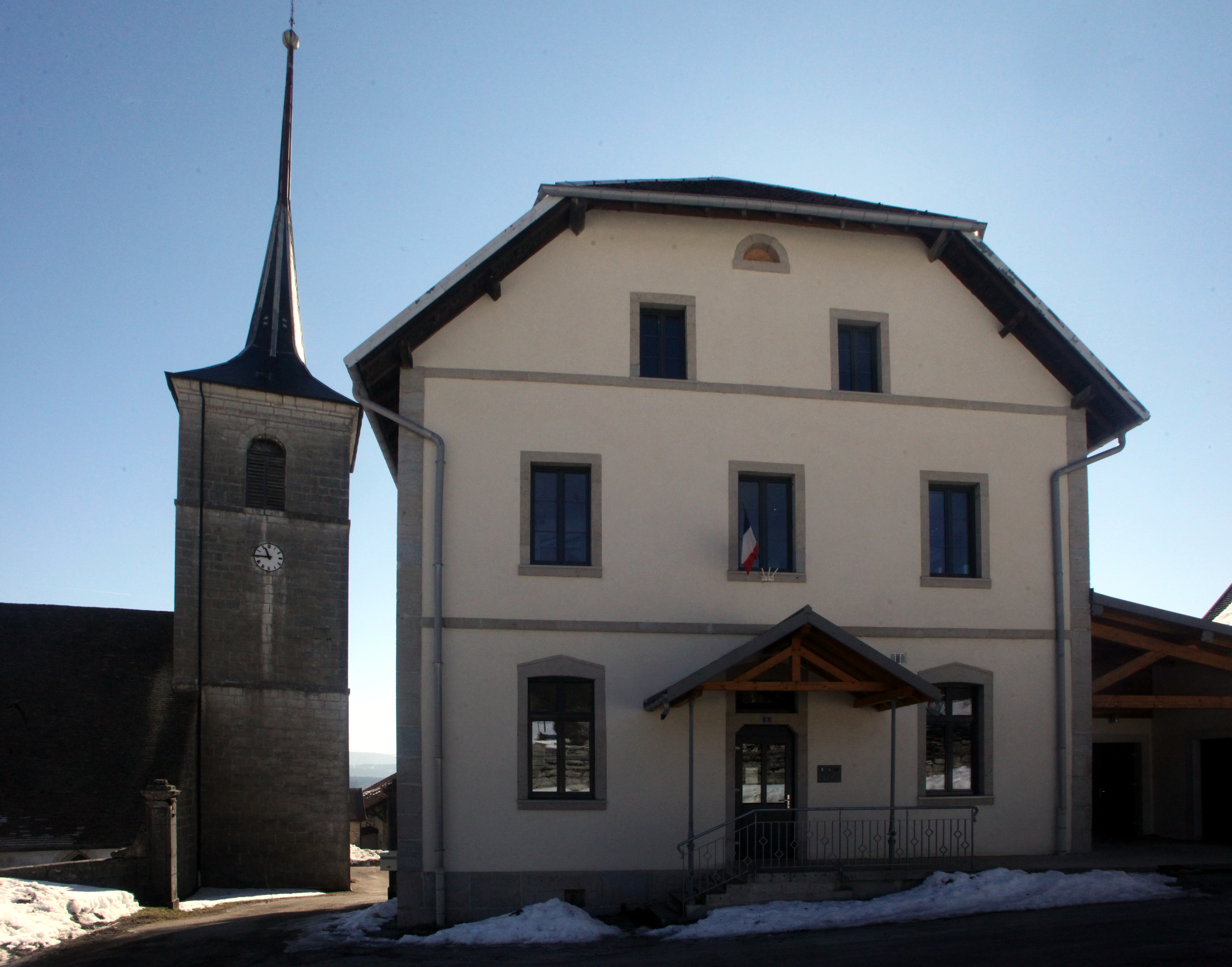
- The town hall in Le Bizot

- Coat of arms
- Location of Le Bizot
- Location within France Location within Bourgogne-Franche-Comté
- Coordinates: 47°08′11″N 6°40′21″E
- Country: France
- Region: Bourgogne-Franche-Comté
- Department: Doubs
- Arrondissement: Pontarlier
- Canton: Morteau
- Intercommunality: Plateau du Russey

Government
  - Mayor (2020–2026): Marlène Renaud
- Area^{1}: 7.85 km^{2} (3.03 sq mi)
- Highest elevation: 1,063 m (3,488 ft)
- Lowest elevation: 887 m (2,910 ft)
- Population (2023): 305
  - Density: 38.9/km^{2} (101/sq mi)
- Time zone: UTC+01:00 (CET)
  - Summer (DST): UTC+02:00 (CEST)
- INSEE/Postal code: 25062 /25210
- ^{1} French Land Register data, which excludes lakes, ponds, glaciers > 1 km^{2} (0.386 sq mi or 247 acres) and river estuaries.

Le Bizot (French pronunciation: [lə bizo]) is a commune in the Doubs department in the Bourgogne-Franche-Comté region in eastern France.

== Population ==
Historical population
| Year | Pop. | ±% p.a. |
|---|---|---|
| 1968 | 129 | — |
| 1975 | 94 | −4.42% |
| 1982 | 131 | +4.86% |
| 1990 | 146 | +1.36% |
| 1999 | 198 | +3.44% |
| 2007 | 251 | +3.01% |
| 2012 | 273 | +1.69% |
| 2017 | 309 | +2.51% |
| 2023 | 305 | −0.22% |
Source: INSEE

== See also ==
- Communes of the Doubs department
