= Le Barboux =

- Commune
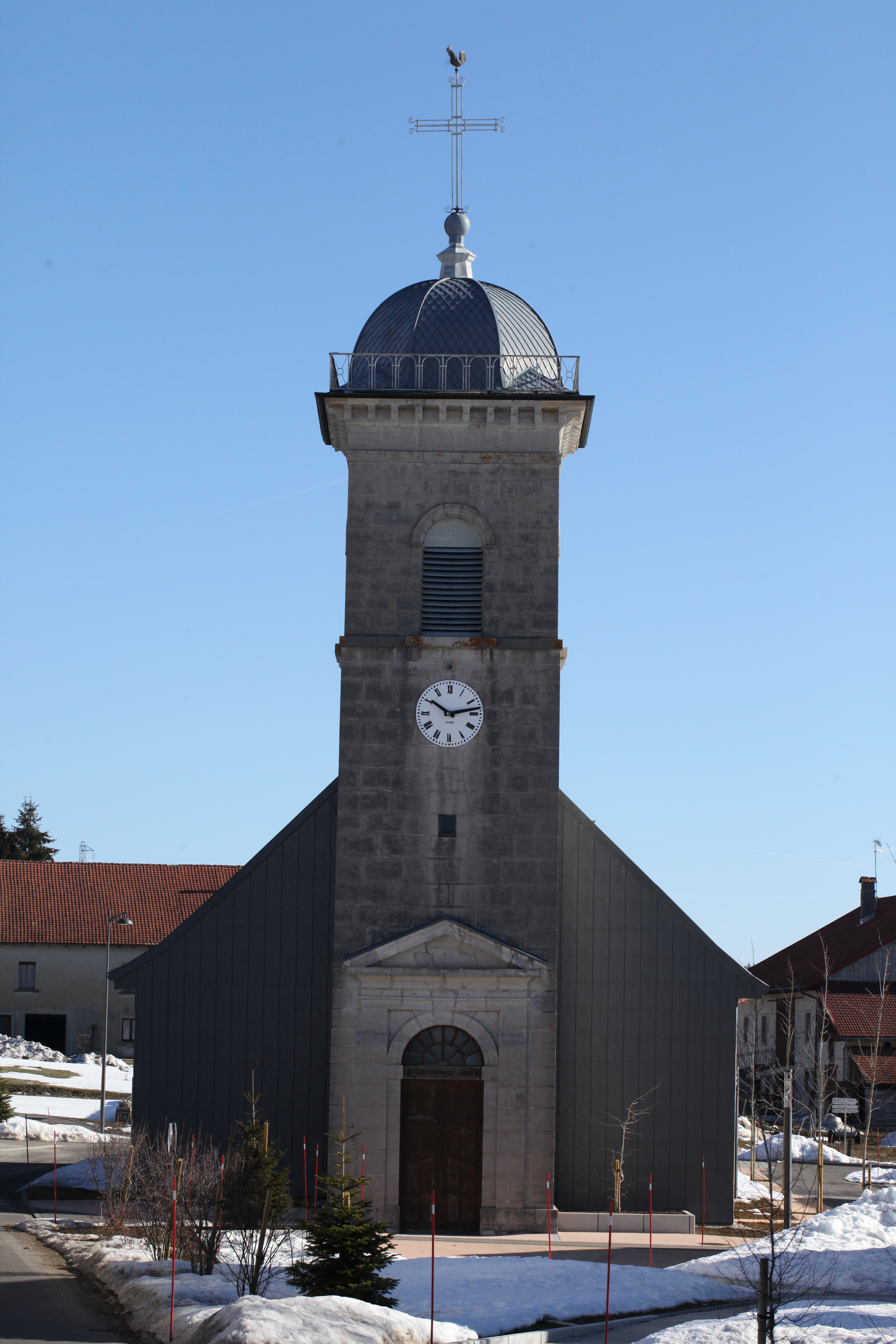
- The church in Le Barboux
- Location of Le Barboux
- Location within France Location within Bourgogne-Franche-Comté
- Coordinates: 47°07′17″N 6°43′04″E
- Country: France
- Region: Bourgogne-Franche-Comté
- Department: Doubs
- Arrondissement: Pontarlier
- Canton: Morteau
- Intercommunality: Plateau de Russey

Government
  - Mayor (2020–2026): Dominique Rondot
- Area^{1}: 11.26 km^{2} (4.35 sq mi)
- Highest elevation: 1,087 m (3,566 ft)
- Lowest elevation: 880 m (2,890 ft)
- Population (2023): 251
  - Density: 22.3/km^{2} (57.7/sq mi)
- Time zone: UTC+01:00 (CET)
  - Summer (DST): UTC+02:00 (CEST)
- INSEE/Postal code: 25042 /25210
- ^{1} French Land Register data, which excludes lakes, ponds, glaciers > 1 km^{2} (0.386 sq mi or 247 acres) and river estuaries.

Le Barboux (French pronunciation: [lə baʁbu]) is a commune in the Doubs department in the Bourgogne-Franche-Comté region in eastern France.

== Population ==
Historical population
Year	Pop.	±% p.a.
1968	170	—
1975	135	−3.24%
1982	134	−0.11%
1990	156	+1.92%
1999	192	+2.33%
2007	232	+2.39%
2012	244	+1.01%
2017	238	−0.50%
2023	251	+0.89%
Source: INSEE

== See also ==
- Communes of the Doubs department
- Lac de Moron
