= Plaimbois-du-Miroir =

- Commune
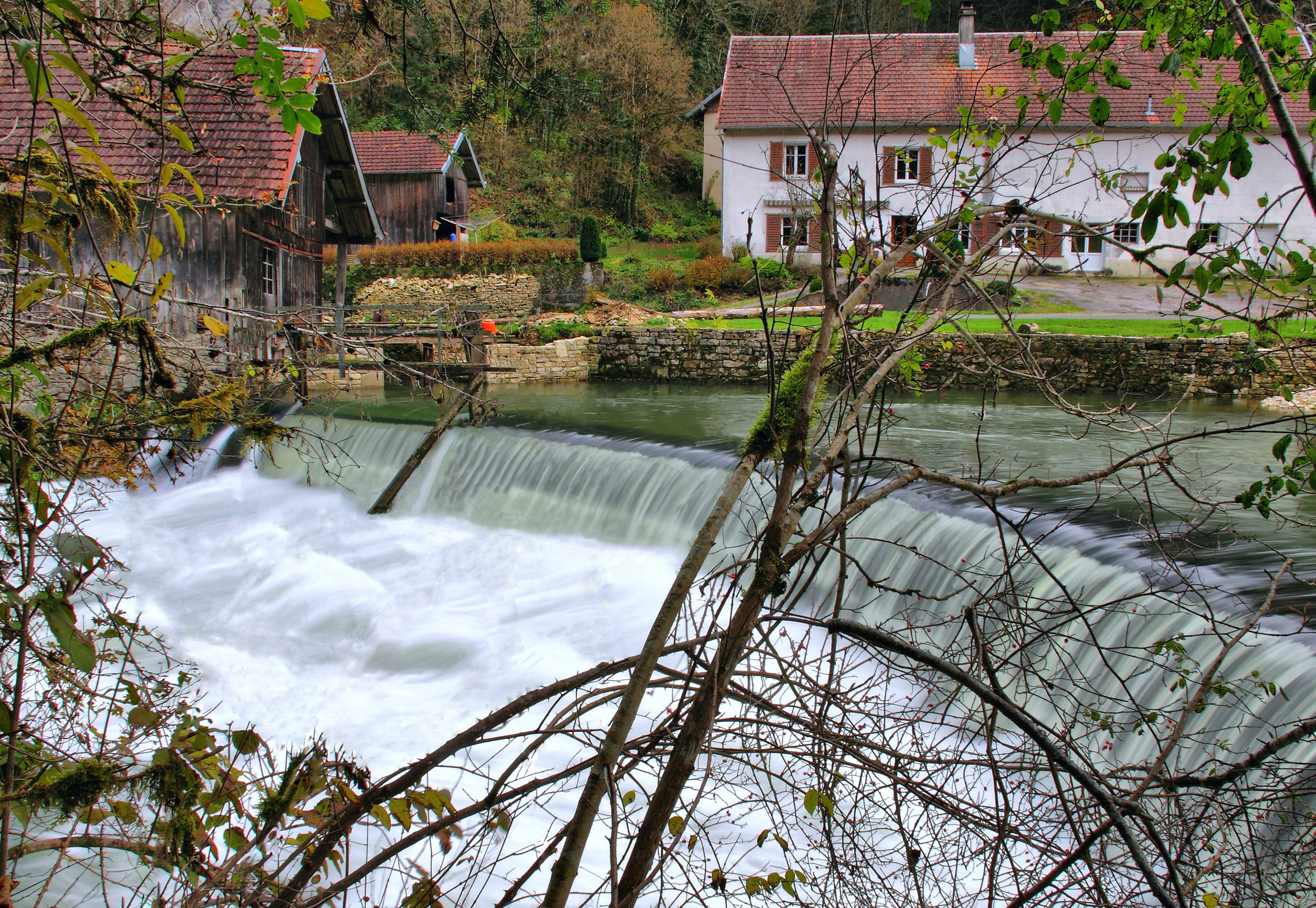
- Millrace
- Location of Plaimbois-du-Miroir
- Location within France Location within Bourgogne-Franche-Comté
- Coordinates: 47°11′32″N 6°38′46″E
- Country: France
- Region: Bourgogne-Franche-Comté
- Department: Doubs
- Arrondissement: Pontarlier
- Canton: Morteau
- Intercommunality: Plateau de Russey

Government
  - Mayor (2020–2026): Jean-Marc Lerat
- Area^{1}: 11.71 km^{2} (4.52 sq mi)
- Highest elevation: 972 m (3,189 ft)
- Lowest elevation: 445 m (1,460 ft)
- Population (2023): 276
  - Density: 23.6/km^{2} (61.0/sq mi)
- Time zone: UTC+01:00 (CET)
  - Summer (DST): UTC+02:00 (CEST)
- INSEE/Postal code: 25456 /25210
- ^{1} French Land Register data, which excludes lakes, ponds, glaciers > 1 km^{2} (0.386 sq mi or 247 acres) and river estuaries.

Plaimbois-du-Miroir (French pronunciation: [plɛ̃bwa dy miʁwaʁ]) is a commune in the Doubs department in the Bourgogne-Franche-Comté region in eastern France.

== Population ==
Historical population
Year	Pop.	±% p.a.
1968	146	—
1975	144	−0.20%
1982	144	+0.00%
1990	131	−1.18%
1999	149	+1.44%
2007	181	+2.46%
2012	223	+4.26%
2017	246	+1.98%
2023	276	+1.94%
Source: INSEE

== See also ==
- Communes of the Doubs department
