= Canton of Morteau =

Coordinates: 47.06°N 6.60°E

The canton of Morteau is an administrative division of the Doubs department, eastern France. Its borders were modified at the French canton reorganisation which came into effect in March 2015. Its seat is in Morteau.

It consists of the following communes:

1. Le Barboux
2. Le Bélieu
3. Le Bizot
4. Bonnétage
5. La Bosse
6. La Chenalotte
7. Les Combes
8. Les Fins
9. Les Fontenelles
10. Grand'Combe-Châteleu
11. Grand'Combe-des-Bois
12. Les Gras
13. Laval-le-Prieuré
14. Le Luhier
15. Le Mémont
16. Montbéliardot
17. Mont-de-Laval
18. Montlebon
19. Morteau
20. Narbief
21. Noël-Cerneux
22. Plaimbois-du-Miroir
23. Le Russey
24. Saint-Julien-lès-Russey
25. Villers-le-Lac
