= Le Russey =

- Commune
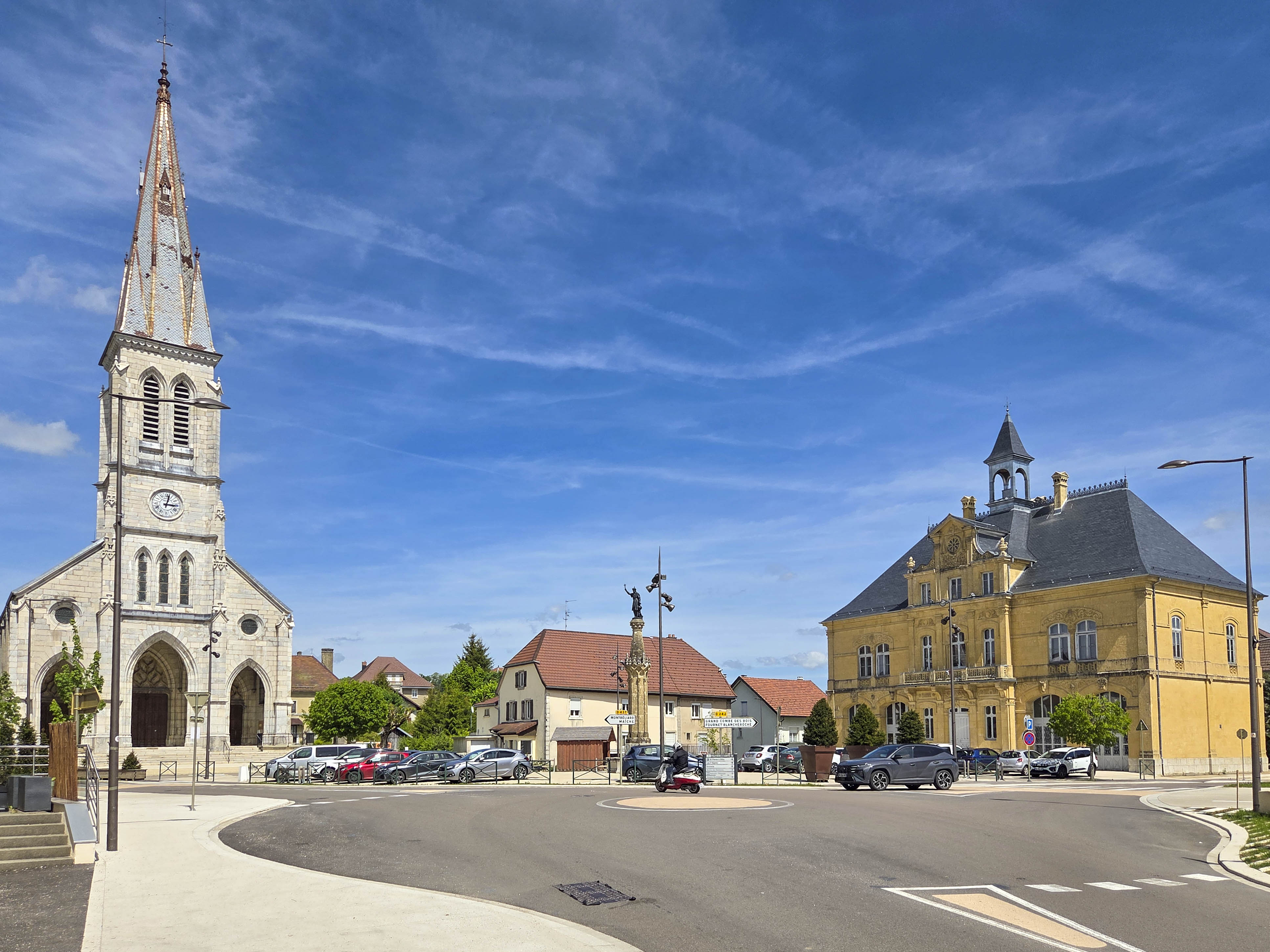
- Saint Nicholas Church and the Town Hall
- Location of Le Russey
- Location within France Location within Bourgogne-Franche-Comté
- Coordinates: 47°09′48″N 6°43′51″E
- Country: France
- Region: Bourgogne-Franche-Comté
- Department: Doubs
- Arrondissement: Pontarlier
- Canton: Morteau
- Intercommunality: Plateau du Russey

Government
  - Mayor (2026–32): Roland Perrot
- Area^{1}: 24.17 km^{2} (9.33 sq mi)
- Highest elevation: 1,034 m (3,392 ft)
- Lowest elevation: 859 m (2,818 ft)
- Population (2023): 2,599
  - Density: 107.5/km^{2} (278.5/sq mi)
- Time zone: UTC+01:00 (CET)
  - Summer (DST): UTC+02:00 (CEST)
- INSEE/Postal code: 25512 /25210
- ^{1} French Land Register data, which excludes lakes, ponds, glaciers > 1 km^{2} (0.386 sq mi or 247 acres) and river estuaries.

Le Russey (French pronunciation: [lə ʁysɛ]) is a commune in the Doubs department in the Bourgogne-Franche-Comté region in eastern France.

== Population ==
Historical population
| Year | Pop. | ±% p.a. |
|---|---|---|
| 1968 | 1,646 | — |
| 1975 | 1,732 | +0.73% |
| 1982 | 1,771 | +0.32% |
| 1990 | 1,824 | +0.37% |
| 1999 | 1,917 | +0.55% |
| 2007 | 1,981 | +0.41% |
| 2012 | 2,233 | +2.42% |
| 2017 | 2,342 | +0.96% |
| 2023 | 2,599 | +1.75% |
Source: INSEE

== History ==
There was a train station from 1905 to 1952, which linked Le Russey, Maîche and Morteau.

== Politics and administration ==
The current mayor is Roland Perrot. Historically, Le Russey has leaned more to the left, especially towards the PS party.

== See also ==
- Communes of the Doubs department
