= County of Montbéliard =

State of the Holy Roman Empire (1042–1793)

Coordinates: 47°30′37″N 6°47′56″E

County of Montbéliard Comté de Montbéliard (French) Grafschaft Mömpelgard (German)
- 1042–1793
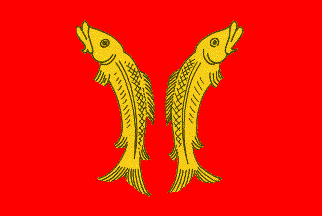
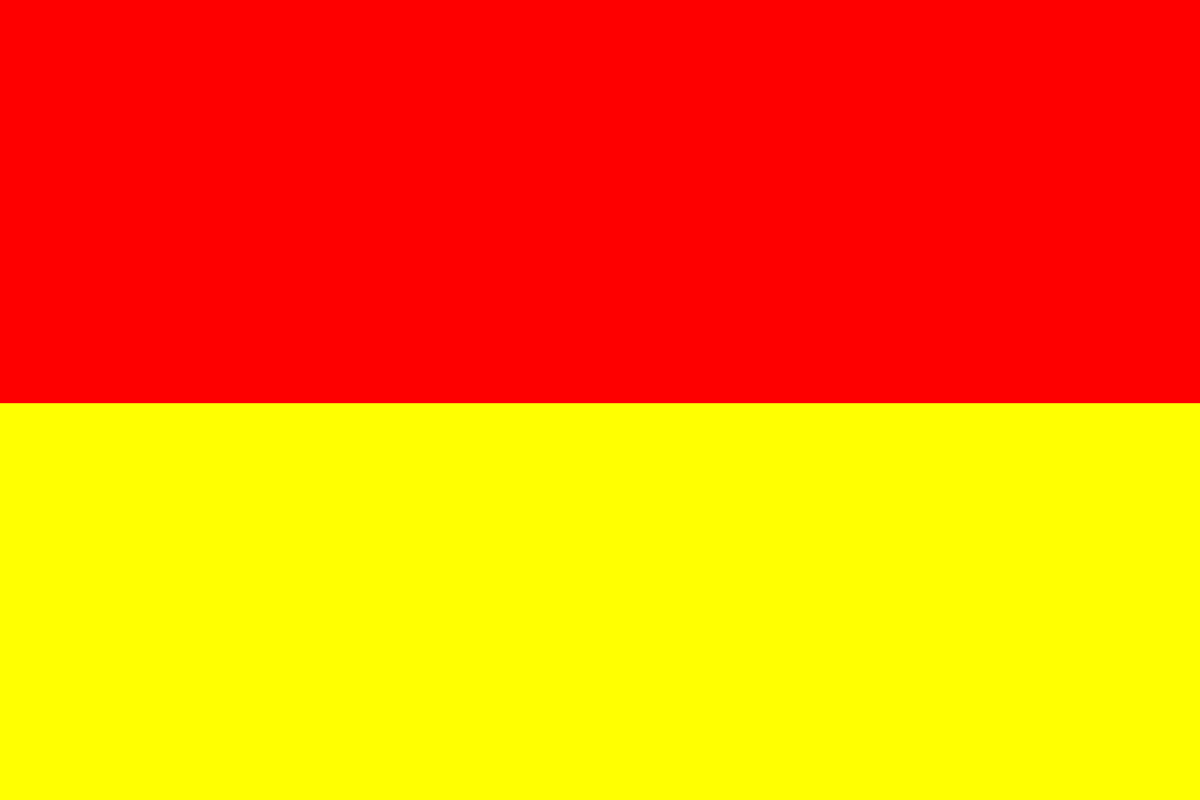
- Top: Old banner of the Counts of Montbéliard; Bottom: State flag (also flag of the city) Coat of arms

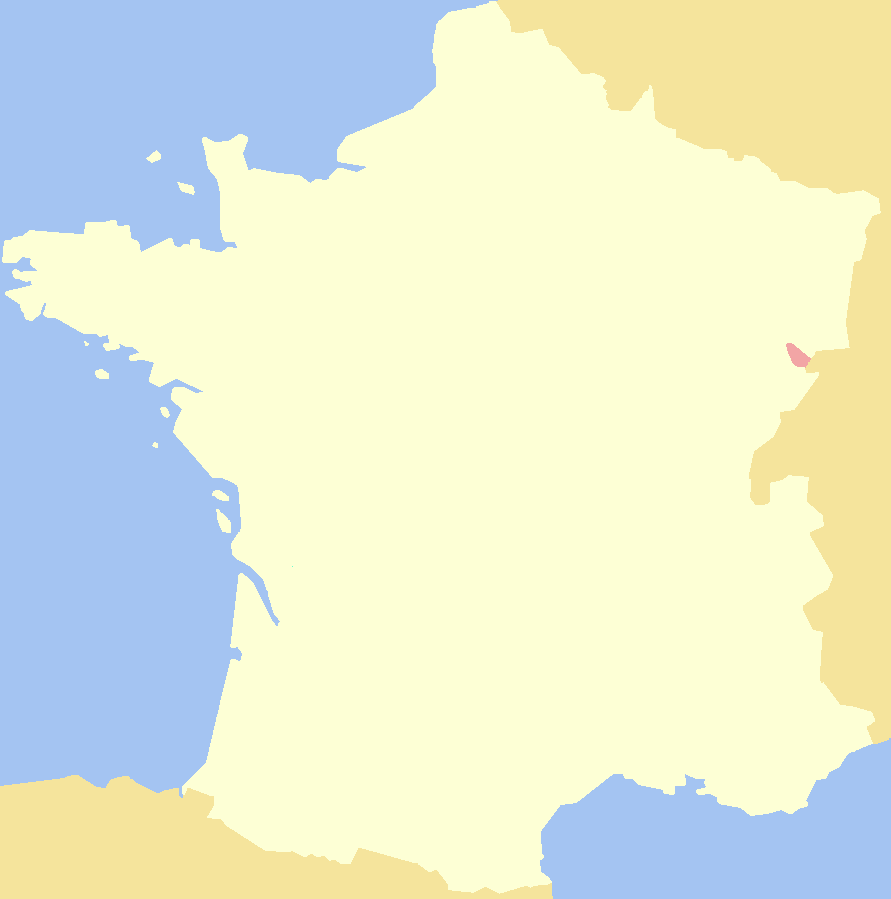
- Location of the County of Montbéliard
- Status: State of the Holy Roman Empire
- Capital: Montbéliard
- Government: Feudal County
- Historical era: Middle Ages; Early modern period
  - Established by Henry III: 1042
  - Acquired by County of Württemberg: 1444
  - Württemberg raised to duchy: 1495
  - Occupied by France: 1793
  - Ceded to France: 1796
Preceded by	Succeeded by
County of Burgundy	French First Republic

The Princely County of Montbéliard (French: Comté princier de Montbéliard; German: Grafschaft Mömpelgard), was a princely county of the Holy Roman Empire seated in the city of Montbéliard in the present-day Franche-Comté region of France. From 1444 onwards it was held by the House of Württemberg. It had full voting rights in the Reichstag.

== History ==
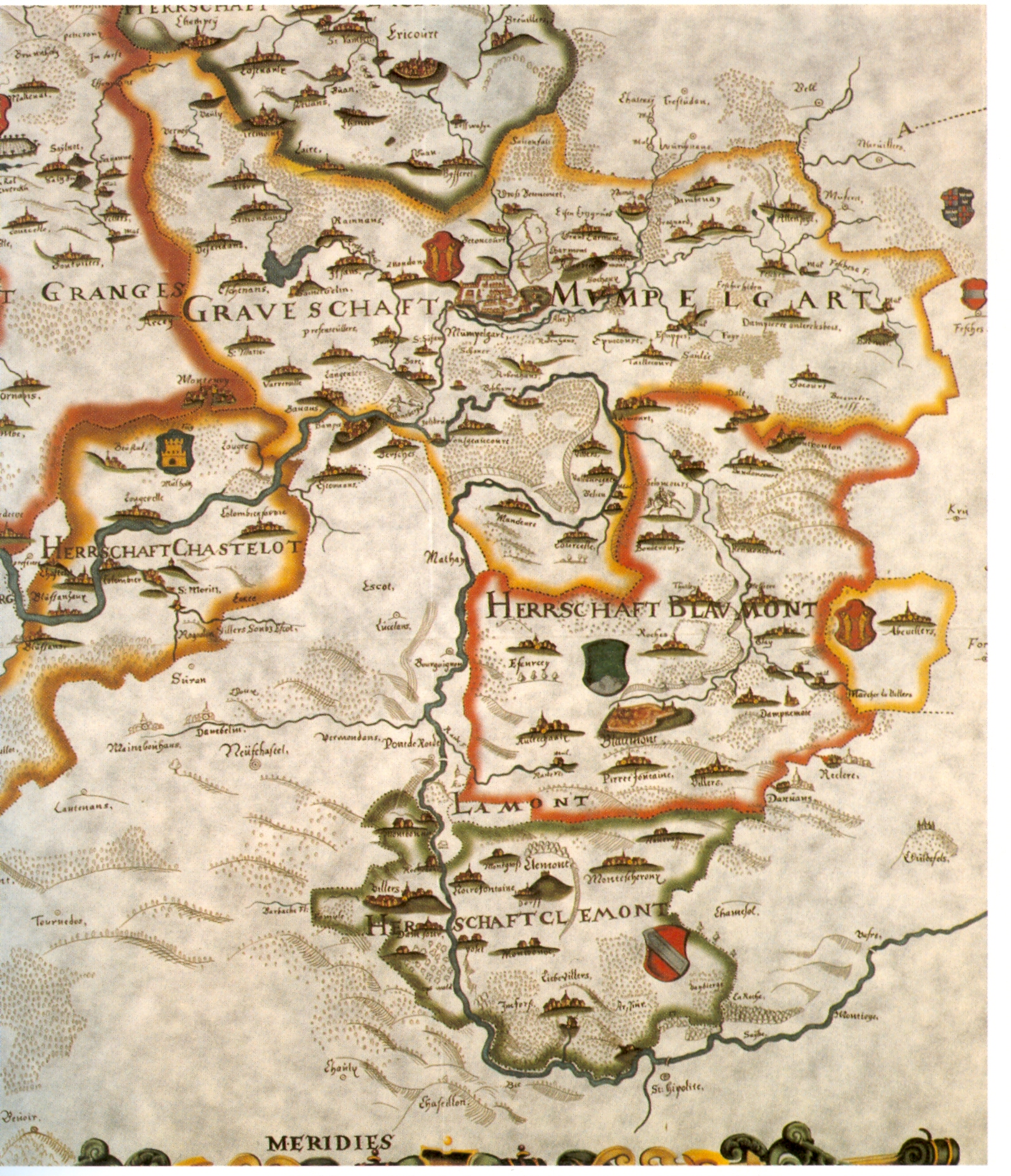
1616 map of "Mumpelgart", "Chastelot", "Clemont", and "Blaumont"

The county was established in 1042 by Emperor Henry III on the territory of the County of Burgundy, part of the Kingdom of Burgundy, a constituent of the Empire since 1033. It was led by a line of Counts of Montbéliard descending from Conrad's vassal Louis of Mousson in Upper Lorraine, husband of Countess Sophie of Bar, and their successors from the Scarpone family. In 1163 Lord Amadeus II of Montfaucon became Count of Montbéliard by marriage to Sophie, daughter of Count Theodoric II (Thierry II), who left no male heirs.

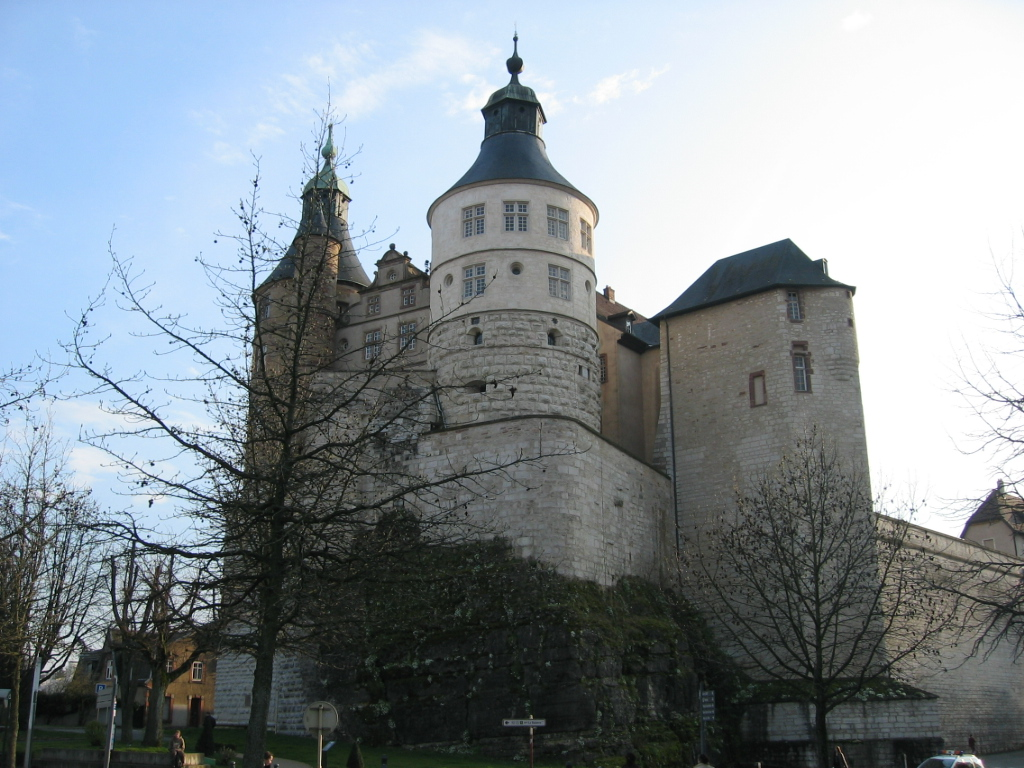
Château de Montbéliard

In 1407, the marriage of Countess Henriette, heiress of Count Stephen of Montfaucon with Eberhard IV of Württemberg tipped the county into the fold of the Swabian nobility in Germany. In addition to the County of Montbéliard, Countess Henriette brought wedding dowries: fiefdoms, such as lordships in Granges-le-Bourg, Clerval, Passavant, Etobon, Porrentruy, with the fiefdoms of Saint-Hippolyte, and lands of Franquemont (Goumois). Some of them were in the County of Burgundy, but the countess administered the County of Burgundy by the sovereign right by virtue of the legacy that is of her grandfather Stephen of Montfaucon, and the tribute that she received from the Burgundian Duke John the Fearless. By the advent of this marriage, inheritance of the County of Montbéliard and its dependencies added to Württemberg who brought the lordship of Riquewihr, Ferrette and the County of Horbourg in Alsace.

Eberhard IV died in 1419 and upon Henriette's death in 1444, Montbéliard was adjudicated to their son Count Ludwig I of Württemberg-Urach. His son Eberhard V annexed Montbéliard as part of the united County of Württemberg, though it still retained its status as an immediate territory and separate county within the county. It was not a vassalage of Württemberg; it was his equal but hereditary committed to the marriage of Count Eberhard IV by Henriette. De facto, the Romance territory would retain "all its rights, traditions and customs, as well as its language" as it was customary in the vast Holy Roman Empire. In 1495 the Count of Montbeliard Eberhard V of Württemberg was raised to the rank of Duke and the county became the "Principality of Montbéliard".

In spite of vicissitudes, Montbéliard was ruled by junior branches of the House of Württemberg for several centuries. Count Frederick I of Montbéliard again inherited the Duchy of Württemberg in 1593, but in 1617 the county was again separated for his younger son Ludwig Frederick and ruled by his descendants until it fell back to Württemberg in 1723. With the annexation in 1748 of the "Four Lands" (land dependent Héricourt – Châtelot – Clémont – Blamont) by King Louis XV, the Principality was reduced to a "single county" until the French Revolution, or more precisely until November 1793. However it maintained its 80th vote in the Imperial Diet.

=== Integration into France ===
In 1793, the County of Montbéliard was occupied by the French First Republic, bringing it forty new townships (Abbévillers, Aibre, Allenjoie, Allondans, Arbouans, Audincourt, Badevel, Bart, Bavans, Bethoncourt, Bretigney, Brognard, Courcelles-lès-Montbéliard, Couthenans, Dambenois, Dampierre-les-Bois, Dasle, Désandans, Dung, Étouvans, Étupes, Exincourt, Fesches-le-Châtel, Grand-Charmont, Issans, Laire, Montbéliard, Nommay, Présentevillers, Raynans, Sainte-Marie, Sainte-Suzanne, Saint-Julien-lès-Montbéliard, Semondans, Sochaux, Taillecourt, Valentigney, Le Vernoy, Vieux-Charmont and Voujeaucourt). With Mandeure, from the Republic of Mandeure annexed at the same time, these municipalities were first linked to the département of Haute-Saône, constituting the new district of Montbéliard in 1793, including 3 cantons (Audincourt, Désandans and Montbéliard).

After the French forces under Jean Victor Marie Moreau had campaigned in Württemberg in the course of the War of the First Coalition in 1796, Duke Frederick II Eugene finally renounced all rights to Montbéliard. In 1797, the cantons were transferred to the département Mont-Terrible. The département was abolished in 1800, being annexed to the Haut-Rhin département. With the new arrangement put in place that year, there were more than 2 cantons (Audincourt and Montbéliard) in the District of Porrentruy. In 1814, Haut-Rhin lost the territories which had been part of Mont-Terrible and returned them to Switzerland, with the exception of Montbéliard, which was transferred to the department of Doubs.

== Rulers ==
House of Montfaucon-Montbéliard

House of Württemberg-Mömpelgard

=== House of Scarpone ===
- Louis (1042–1073)
- Theodoric I (1073–1105)
- Theodoric II (1105–1163)

=== House of Montfaucon ===
- Amadeus I (1163–1195)
- Richard I (1195–1227)
- Theodoric III (1227–1283)
- Guillemette (1283–1317), with Reginald
- Reginald (1317–1322), solo
- Othenin (1322–1332)
- Henry I (1332–1367)
- Stephen (1367–1397)
- Henriette (1397–1444)

=== House of Württemberg ===
- Ludwig I (1444–1450)
- Ludwig II (1450–1457)
- Eberhard I (1457–1473; 1482–1496)
- Henry (1473–1482)
- Eberhard II (1496–1498)
- Ulrich (1498–1526; 1534–1542)
- George I (1526–1534; 1553–1558)
- Cristoph (1542–1553)
- Frederick I (1558–1608)
- Johann Frederick (1608–1617)
  - From 1617 to 1723, Montbéliard was ruled under the Mömpelgard branch of the House of Württemberg. See below.
- Eberhard-Ludwig (1723–1733)
- Karl I Alexander (1723–1737)
- Karl II Eugen (1744–1793)

==== House of Württemberg-Mömpelgard ====
- Louis Frederick (1617–1631)
- Leopold Frederick (1640–1662)
- George II (1662–1699)
- Leopold Eberhard (1699–1723)

== Religion ==
Montbéliard had been Catholic until 1524, when Duke Ulrich sent for French theologian William Farel to bring the teachings of Oecolampadius to the county.
