= Glay, Doubs =

Glay
- Commune
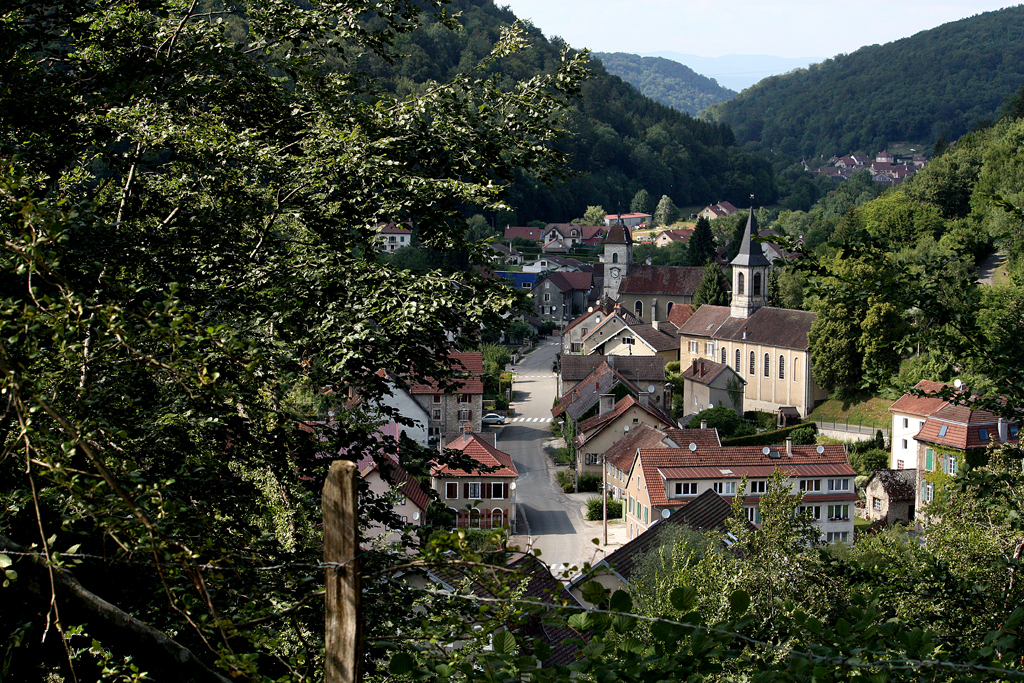
- A general view of Glay

- Coat of arms
- Location of Glay
- Location within France Location within Bourgogne-Franche-Comté
- Coordinates: 47°24′23″N 6°53′28″E
- Country: France
- Region: Bourgogne-Franche-Comté
- Department: Doubs
- Arrondissement: Montbéliard
- Canton: Maîche
- Intercommunality: Pays de Montbéliard Agglomération

Government
  - Mayor (2020–2026): Christian Maillard
- Area^{1}: 6.49 km^{2} (2.51 sq mi)
- Elevation: 401 m (1,316 ft)
- Highest elevation: 566 m (1,857 ft)
- Lowest elevation: 385 m (1,263 ft)
- Population (2023): 339
  - Density: 52.2/km^{2} (135/sq mi)
- Time zone: UTC+01:00 (CET)
  - Summer (DST): UTC+02:00 (CEST)
- INSEE/Postal code: 25274 /25310
- ^{1} French Land Register data, which excludes lakes, ponds, glaciers > 1 km^{2} (0.386 sq mi or 247 acres) and river estuaries.

Glay (French pronunciation: [ɡlɛ]) is a commune in the Doubs department in eastern France. It is located in the Jura Mountains near the border with Switzerland.

== History ==
The area around Glay was part of Burgundy as early as 888, and came under the control of the Holy Roman Empire in 1034.

The village is first historically reported in the 12th century as a centre for glass making, and the name Glay comes from the French word for glass. Control of the area changed hands many times in the following centuries as the many small feudal regions constantly competed with each other for land, taxes and prominence. During the period 1200-1700 Glay was alternately ruled by cities and states that are now part of modern France (Montbéliard), Germany (Württemberg) and Switzerland (Neuchâtel).

In 1259 Marguerite of Montbeliard, daughter of Thierry III of Montbéliard (1205–1283) married the Grand Duke of Neuchâtel. Included as part of her dowry were the seigniories of Blamont (including Glay), Châtelot, Belmont and Cuisance. Blamont was placed by the Lords of Neuchâtel under the protection of the counts and dukes of Burgundy to protect it from being taken back by Montbéliard once control had passed to later generations.

In his will Thierry III passed control of Montbéliard itself to the Countess Guillemette, his great-granddaughter. Since she had married a lord of Burgundy, the entirety of Montbéliard now came under the control of Burgundy, which outraged the other descendants of Thierry III, who had hoped to rule the area themselves. In order to avoid a war of succession, Renaud of Burgundy made some concessions. In the spring of 1283 he ceded to Thiébaud IV, Lord of Neuchâtel, the seigniories of Blamont (including Glay) and Châtelot, and guaranteed their status as being held by Neuchâtel.

At least twice in the century that followed Glay sought to free itself from the control of Neuchâtel by force of arms. Each effort was defeated.

In 1340 Thiébaud VI of Neuchâtel received the villages of Glay, Hérimoncourt, Pierrefontaine, Seloncourt and Villars-lès-Blamont as part of the dowry brought by his wife upon their marriage.

In 1383 Glay was part of the dowry (with many other local towns) of the wife of Thiébaud VIII of Neuchâtel. In the centuries that followed it was part of the ever-changing alliances, rivalries and wars between Montbéliard, the Duke of Burgundy, the Kingdom of France, the Swiss Confederation and Basel.

In 1439 mercenaries who were not paid after the Treaty of Arras (1435) ended the war between King Charles VII of France and Philip, Duke of Burgundy plundered the area.

In August 1474 during the Burgundian Wars, following the devastation of Alsace by Charles the Bold, the area was again heavily damaged in the fighting. After Charles' death at the hands of the Swiss in the Battle of Nancy in 1477, the area around Glay came under the control of the Bishop of Basel, Jean de Venningen. The church returned the area to Neuchâtel in 1478.

By the early 16th century the power of the Lords of Neuchâtel was on the decline after Thiébaud IX failed to produce a male heir. After a struggle over succession marked by wars and lawsuits, on 4 May 1506 Ulrich, Duke of Württemberg, who had also taken control of Montbéliard and held the title of Count of Montbéliard, bought all of Blamont, including Glay.

Because the German Dukes of Württemberg were Lutheran, the area around Glay has since this time been Lutheran, despite the fact that France overall is predominantly Catholic.

During the Thirty Years War the area around Glay suffered tremendously. In 1635 alone the region was invaded by troops from both warring alliances and suffered from the plague and famine.

After a period under the control of Spain, the region around Glay was occupied by the French in 1668 but handed back under the Treaty of Aix-la-Chapelle. France again conquered the area in 1674, and it was finally ceded to France at the Treaty of Nijmegen in 1678. Control from the King in Paris brought heavy taxation that devastated the local economy.

In 1790, after the French Revolution, the Department of Doubs was created, which includes the area around Glay.

When Napoleon was defeated at Waterloo in 1815, border skirmishes broke out between French troops and those from various subdivisions of Switzerland as the latter tried to take advantage of the chaos in Paris. Although Glay remained within the areas controlled by France adjacent to the Swiss border, the area suffered still further damage.

In World War II Glay was liberated by French forces in September 1944, although some fighting continued in the region through November.

== Centre de Glay ==
In recent years the town had benefitted from the presence of the Centre de Glay, which was most recently a convention centre with a 120-room hotel designed to draw more visitors to the area. The facility was founded in 1823 by the Swiss minister Father Jacquet to provide vocational training to disadvantaged Protestant children from the area. It later sheltered a private college, and was converted to a conference centre in 1953. The Centre closed in September 2004 for budgetary reasons, and because the older buildings did not meet current European Union building codes. The closing was lamented as a loss to the Lutheran communities of the area.

== Population ==
Historical population
Year	Pop.	±% p.a.
1968	314	—
1975	325	+0.49%
1982	268	−2.72%
1990	307	+1.71%
1999	314	+0.25%
2007	319	+0.20%
2012	360	+2.45%
2017	340	−1.14%
2023	339	−0.05%
Source: INSEE

== Nearby towns ==
The following diagram shows the towns nearby within a 2.4 miles (3.9 km) radius.

Distances and relative position of some populations

== See also ==
- Communes of the Doubs department
