= Roches-lès-Blamont =

- Commune
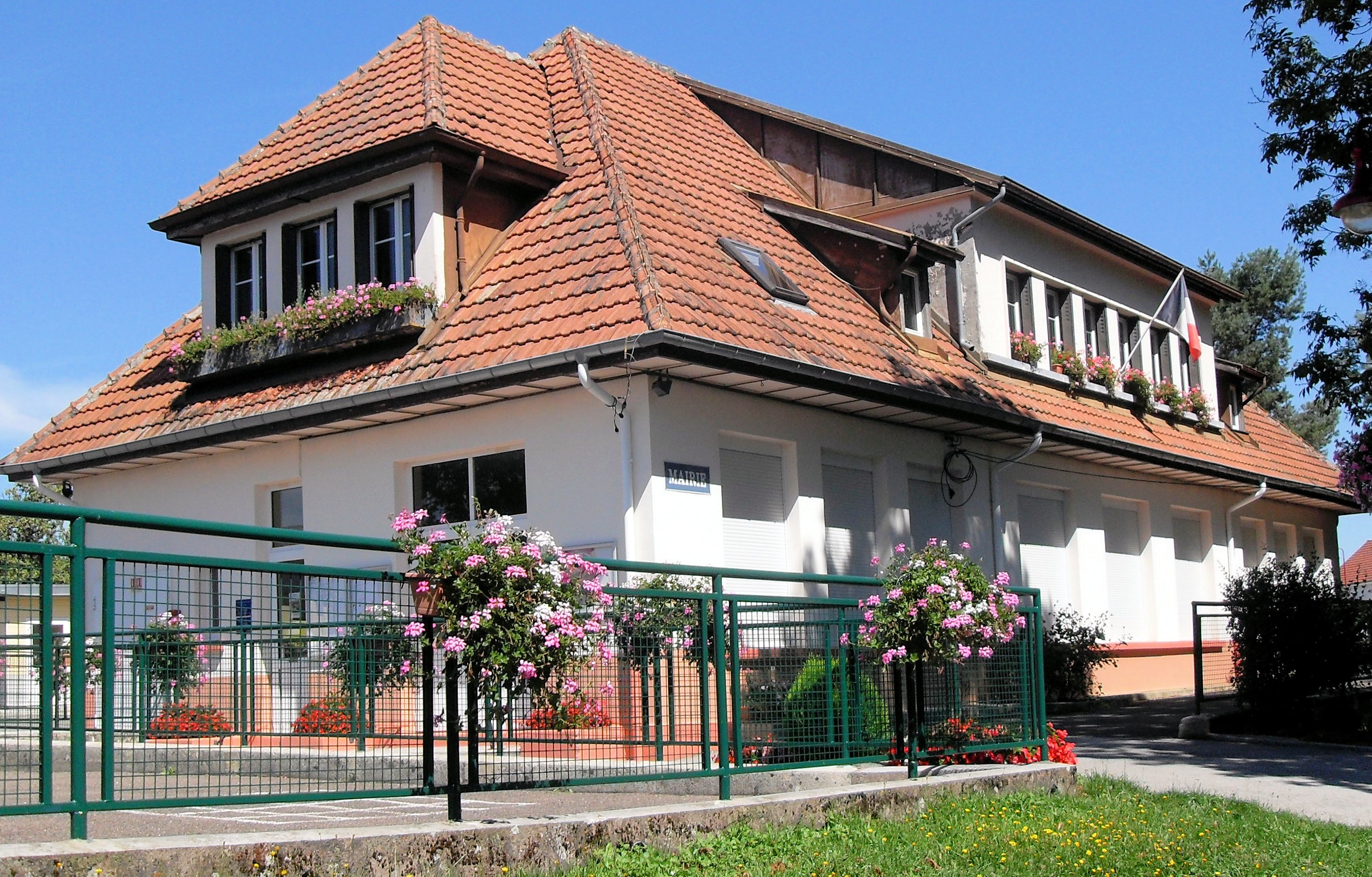
- The town hall in Roches-lès-Blamont

- Coat of arms
- Location of Roches-lès-Blamont
- Location within France Location within Bourgogne-Franche-Comté
- Coordinates: 47°24′36″N 6°51′07″E
- Country: France
- Region: Bourgogne-Franche-Comté
- Department: Doubs
- Arrondissement: Montbéliard
- Canton: Maîche
- Intercommunality: Pays de Montbéliard Agglomération

Government
  - Mayor (2020–2026): Georges Haberstich
- Area^{1}: 5.44 km^{2} (2.10 sq mi)
- Highest elevation: 573 m (1,880 ft)
- Lowest elevation: 417 m (1,368 ft)
- Population (2023): 612
  - Density: 113/km^{2} (291/sq mi)
- Time zone: UTC+01:00 (CET)
  - Summer (DST): UTC+02:00 (CEST)
- INSEE/Postal code: 25497 /25310
- ^{1} French Land Register data, which excludes lakes, ponds, glaciers > 1 km^{2} (0.386 sq mi or 247 acres) and river estuaries.

Roches-lès-Blamont (French pronunciation: [ʁɔʃ lɛ blamɔ̃], literally Roches near Blamont) is a commune in the eastern French department of Doubs.

== Geography ==
The commune lies 5 km (3.1 mi) south of Hérimoncourt between Switzerland, the Lomont chain, and the valley of the Doubs.

== Population ==
Historical population
Year	Pop.	±% p.a.
1968	292	—
1975	377	+3.72%
1982	493	+3.91%
1990	548	+1.33%
1999	574	+0.52%
2007	646	+1.49%
2012	630	−0.50%
2017	632	+0.06%
2023	612	−0.53%
Source: INSEE

== See also ==
- Blamont
- Communes of the Doubs department

== History ==
Archaeological excavations revealed a prehistoric settlement in the Chataillon Forest that was occupied from the Middle Neolithic through the Early Bronze Age. The site stood on a naturally defended spur reinforced by a rampart and an artificial terrace.
