= Dampierre-sur-le-Doubs =

- Commune
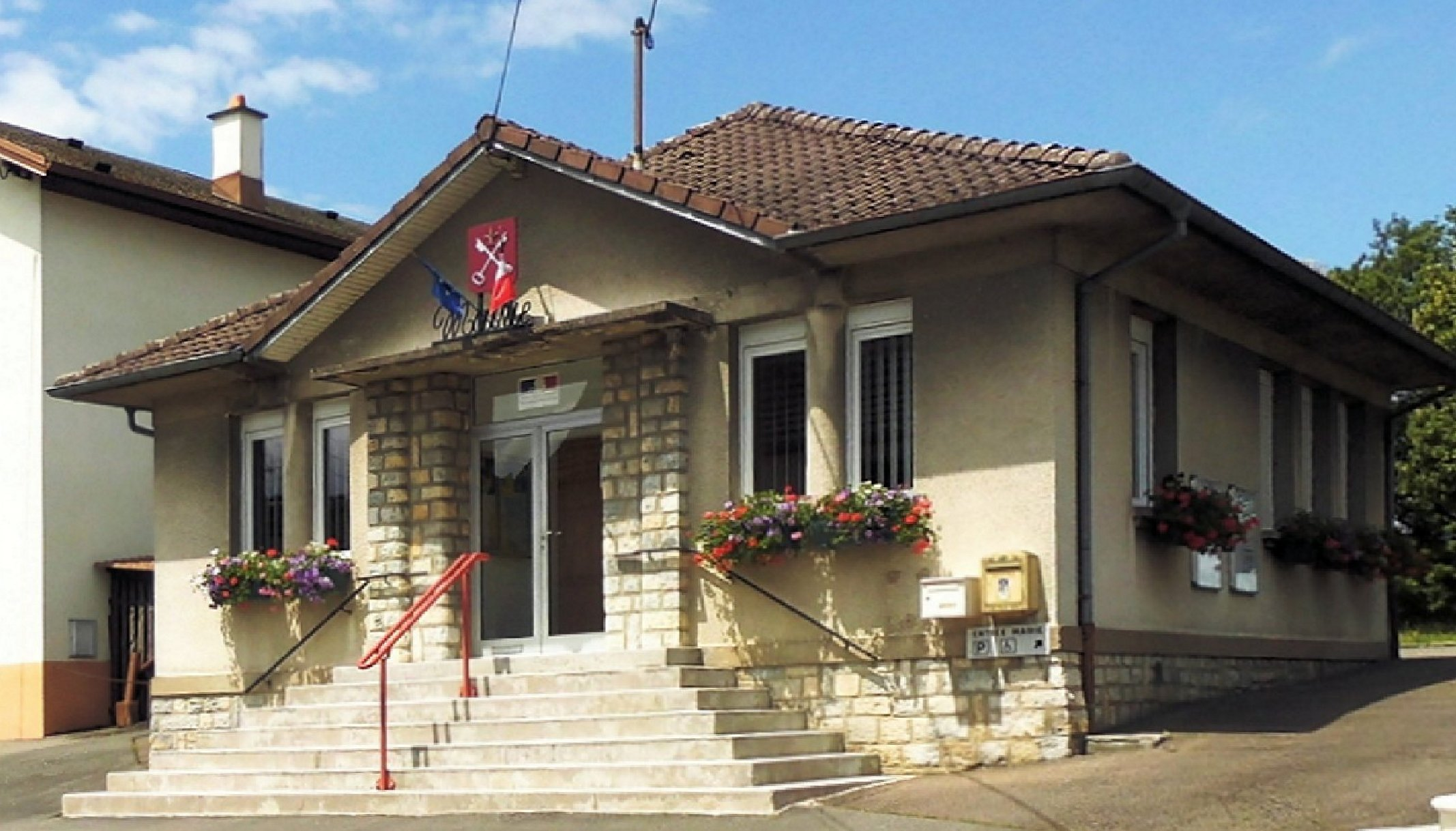
- The town hall in Dampierre-sur-le-Doubs

- Coat of arms
- Location of Dampierre-sur-le-Doubs
- Location within France Location within Bourgogne-Franche-Comté
- Coordinates: 47°28′32″N 6°43′59″E
- Country: France
- Region: Bourgogne-Franche-Comté
- Department: Doubs
- Arrondissement: Montbéliard
- Canton: Bavans
- Intercommunality: Pays de Montbéliard Agglomération

Government
  - Mayor (2020–2026): Yanick Génin
- Area^{1}: 3.16 km^{2} (1.22 sq mi)
- Highest elevation: 458 m (1,503 ft)
- Lowest elevation: 301 m (988 ft)
- Population (2023): 450
  - Density: 140/km^{2} (370/sq mi)
- Time zone: UTC+01:00 (CET)
  - Summer (DST): UTC+02:00 (CEST)
- INSEE/Postal code: 25191 /25420
- ^{1} French Land Register data, which excludes lakes, ponds, glaciers > 1 km^{2} (0.386 sq mi or 247 acres) and river estuaries.

Dampierre-sur-le-Doubs (French pronunciation: [dɑ̃pjɛʁ syʁ lə du], literally Dampierre on the Doubs) is a commune in the Doubs department in the Bourgogne-Franche-Comté region in eastern France.

== Population ==
Historical population
Year	Pop.	±% p.a.
1968	315	—
1975	391	+3.14%
1982	474	+2.79%
1990	536	+1.55%
1999	494	−0.90%
2007	503	+0.23%
2012	483	−0.81%
2017	457	−1.10%
2023	450	−0.26%
Source: INSEE

== See also ==
- Doubs (river)
- Communes of the Doubs department
