= Beutal =

- Commune
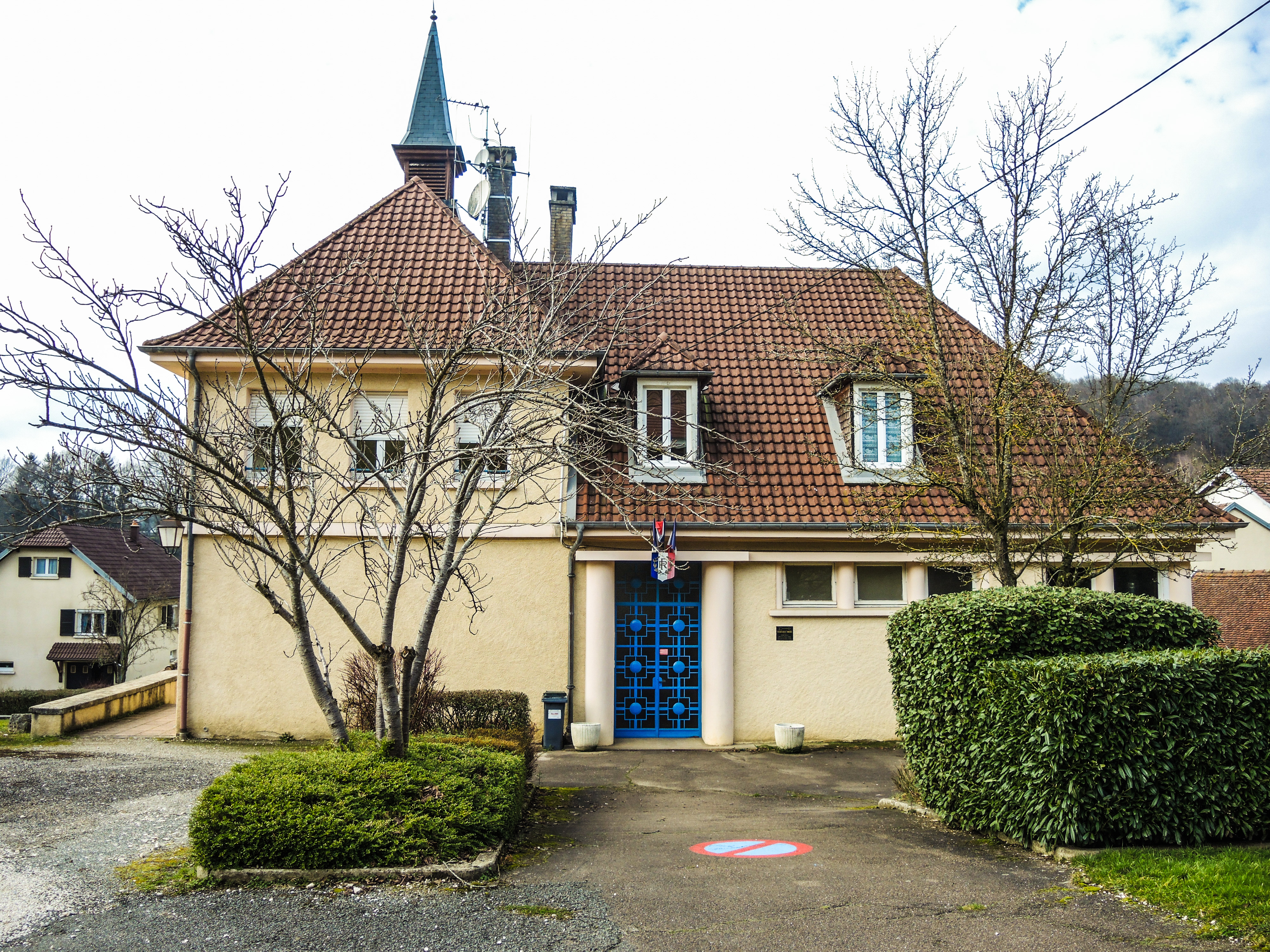
- The town hall in Beutal

- Coat of arms
- Location of Beutal
- Location within France Location within Bourgogne-Franche-Comté
- Coordinates: 47°28′19″N 6°38′21″E
- Country: France
- Region: Bourgogne-Franche-Comté
- Department: Doubs
- Arrondissement: Montbéliard
- Canton: Bavans
- Intercommunality: Pays de Montbéliard Agglomération

Government
  - Mayor (2020–2026): Roland Thierry
- Area^{1}: 5.78 km^{2} (2.23 sq mi)
- Elevation: 335 m (1,099 ft)
- Highest elevation: 469 m (1,539 ft)
- Lowest elevation: 310 m (1,020 ft)
- Population (2023): 271
  - Density: 46.9/km^{2} (121/sq mi)
- Time zone: UTC+01:00 (CET)
  - Summer (DST): UTC+02:00 (CEST)
- INSEE/Postal code: 25059 /25250
- ^{1} French Land Register data, which excludes lakes, ponds, glaciers > 1 km^{2} (0.386 sq mi or 247 acres) and river estuaries.

Beutal (French pronunciation: [bøtal]) is a commune in the Doubs department in the Bourgogne-Franche-Comté region in eastern France.

== Population ==
Historical population
| Year | Pop. | ±% p.a. |
|---|---|---|
| 1968 | 162 | — |
| 1975 | 163 | +0.09% |
| 1982 | 216 | +4.10% |
| 1990 | 215 | −0.06% |
| 1999 | 199 | −0.86% |
| 2007 | 256 | +3.20% |
| 2012 | 281 | +1.88% |
| 2017 | 277 | −0.29% |
| 2023 | 271 | −0.36% |
Source: INSEE

== See also ==
- Communes of the Doubs department
