= Pays de Montbéliard Agglomération =

Coordinates: 43°20′N 03°15′E

- Communauté d'agglomération
- Country: France
- Region: Bourgogne-Franche-Comté
- Department: Doubs
- No. of communes: {{{nbcomm}}}
- Established: 2017
- Area: 451.4 km^{2} (174.3 sq mi)
- Population (2021): 139,653
  - Density: 309.4/km^{2} (801.3/sq mi)
- Website: www.agglo-montbeliard.fr

Pays de Montbéliard Agglomération is the communauté d'agglomération, an intercommunal structure, centred on the city of Montbéliard. It is located in the Doubs department, in the Bourgogne-Franche-Comté region, eastern France. It was established in January 2017 by the merger of the former communauté d'agglomération du Pays de Montbéliard with 3 former communautés de communes and 9 other communes. In January 2024 the commune Dampjoux joined the agglomeration community. Its seat is in Montbéliard. Its area is 451.4 km^{2}. Its population was 139,653 in 2021, of which 25,573 in Montbéliard proper.

== Composition ==
The communauté d'agglomération consists of the following 73 communes:

1. Abbévillers
2. Allenjoie
3. Allondans
4. Arbouans
5. Audincourt
6. Autechaux-Roide
7. Badevel
8. Bart
9. Bavans
10. Berche
11. Bethoncourt
12. Beutal
13. Blamont
14. Bondeval
15. Bourguignon
16. Bretigney
17. Brognard
18. Colombier-Fontaine
19. Courcelles-lès-Montbéliard
20. Dambelin
21. Dambenois
22. Dampierre-les-Bois
23. Dampierre-sur-le-Doubs
24. Dampjoux
25. Dannemarie
26. Dasle
27. Dung
28. Échenans
29. Écot
30. Écurcey
31. Étouvans
32. Étupes
33. Exincourt
34. Fesches-le-Châtel
35. Feule
36. Glay
37. Goux-lès-Dambelin
38. Grand-Charmont
39. Hérimoncourt
40. Issans
41. Longevelle-sur-Doubs
42. Lougres
43. Mandeure
44. Mathay
45. Meslières
46. Montbéliard
47. Montenois
48. Neuchâtel-Urtière
49. Noirefontaine
50. Nommay
51. Pierrefontaine-lès-Blamont
52. Pont-de-Roide-Vermondans
53. Présentevillers
54. Raynans
55. Rémondans-Vaivre
56. Roches-lès-Blamont
57. Sainte-Marie
58. Sainte-Suzanne
59. Saint-Julien-lès-Montbéliard
60. Saint-Maurice-Colombier
61. Seloncourt
62. Semondans
63. Sochaux
64. Solemont
65. Taillecourt
66. Thulay
67. Valentigney
68. Vandoncourt
69. Vieux-Charmont
70. Villars-lès-Blamont
71. Villars-sous-Dampjoux
72. Villars-sous-Écot
73. Voujeaucourt
