= Charles François Philibert Masson =

French writer (1762–1807)

Charles François Philibert Masson (1762 in Blamont – 1807 in Coblenz) was a Frenchman who is notable for the books that he published. His Secret Memoirs of the Court of St Petersburg described the court of Catherine the Great and Paul I of Russia. They are still in print.

Charles François Philibert Masson was a member of the Institut de France

He started his career as an apprentice watchmaker in Neuchâtel, but he was more interested in the arts and traveled to Russia where he became the tutor of the children of Count Nikolai Saltykov, the Minister of War. The count made him his major domus. He made himself popular in the élite of Saint Petersburg through his wit, his taste in literature and his conversation.

He became private secretary to grandduke Alexander of Russia, the man who became Tsar Alexander I in 1805.

Charles François Philibert Masson was popular in the great houses of Saint Petersburg and at court but the tyrannical Tsar Paul I expelled him from Russia as an outspoken sympathiser of the French Revolution.

He lived in Germany for a while before returning to France where he published his Mémoires secrets sur la Russie.

At the time of his death he worked as a French government-official, "secrétaire-général de la préfecture", in Coblenz by the Rhine, in those days a French city.

== Some of the works by Charles François Philibert Masson ==
- Secret Memoirs of the Court of St Petersburg, published in 1800 or 1802, translated from the French into English in 1895
- les Helvétiens: En Huit Chants , poems, 1799
- La nouvelle Astrée, a novel about knights
- Ode sur la fondation de la république, a poem that won a prize from the Institut de France in 1802
- statistique du département de Rhin et Moselle, a work on geography
- les jardins de Samboursky, a poem
- Elmire ou la fleur qui ne se flétrit jamais, a story, Berlin 1790
- Cours mémorial de géographie Berlijn 1787 and St. Petersburg 1790. An instruction for pupils of the school for artillery
