= Villars-lès-Blamont =

- Commune
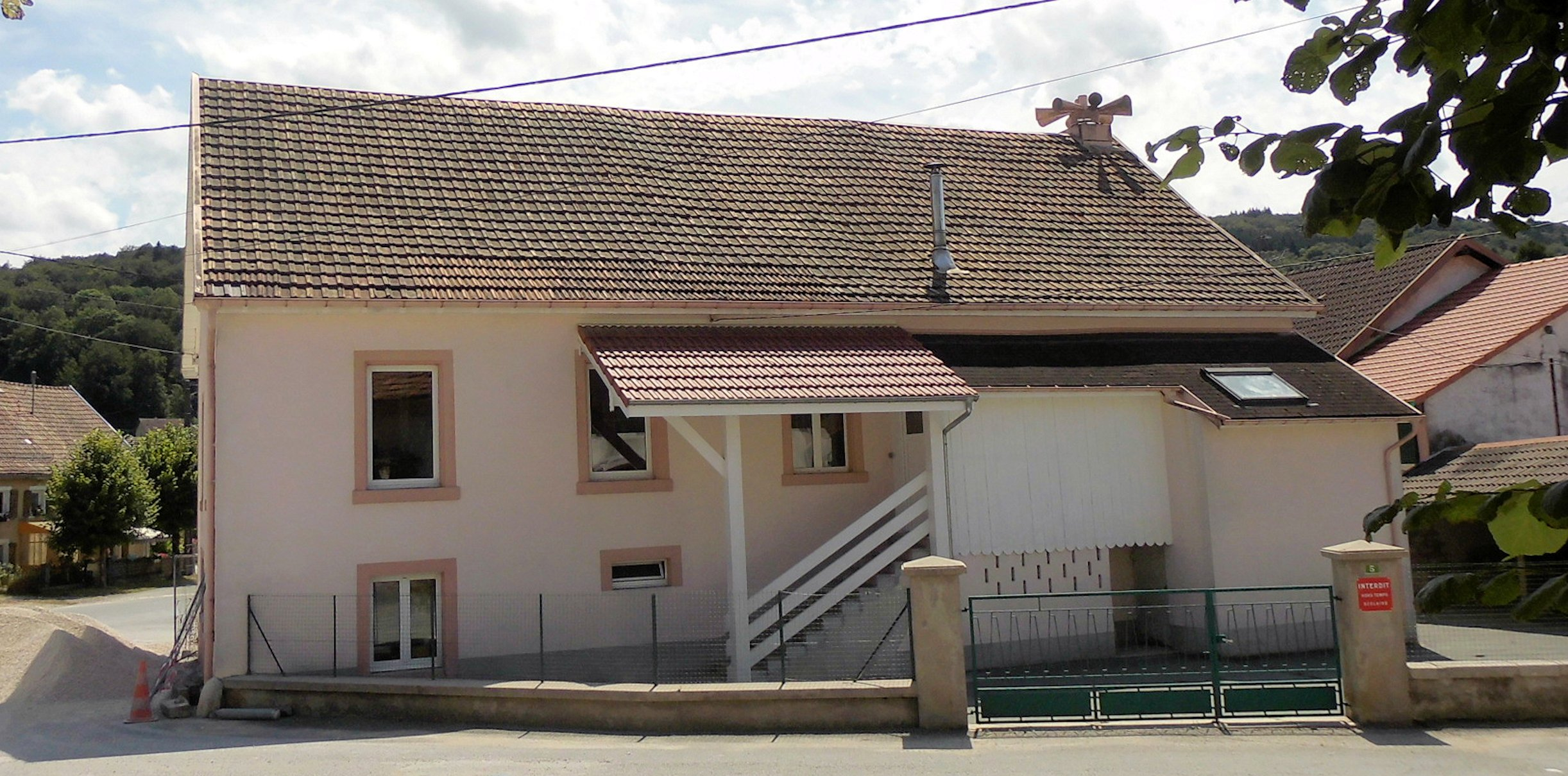
- The town hall in Villars-lès-Blamont

- Coat of arms
- Location of Villars-lès-Blamont
- Location within France Location within Bourgogne-Franche-Comté
- Coordinates: 47°22′27″N 6°52′26″E
- Country: France
- Region: Bourgogne-Franche-Comté
- Department: Doubs
- Arrondissement: Montbéliard
- Canton: Maîche
- Intercommunality: Pays de Montbéliard Agglomération

Government
  - Mayor (2020–2026): Anselme Desmiraz
- Area^{1}: 6.95 km^{2} (2.68 sq mi)
- Highest elevation: 820 m (2,690 ft)
- Lowest elevation: 540 m (1,770 ft)
- Population (2023): 469
  - Density: 67.5/km^{2} (175/sq mi)
- Time zone: UTC+01:00 (CET)
  - Summer (DST): UTC+02:00 (CEST)
- INSEE/Postal code: 25615 /25310
- ^{1} French Land Register data, which excludes lakes, ponds, glaciers > 1 km^{2} (0.386 sq mi or 247 acres) and river estuaries.

Villars-lès-Blamont (French pronunciation: [vilaʁ lɛ blamɔ̃], literally Villars near Blamont) is a commune in the Doubs department in the Bourgogne-Franche-Comté region in eastern France.

== Population ==
Historical population
Year	Pop.	±% p.a.
1968	345	—
1975	363	+0.73%
1982	368	+0.20%
1990	366	−0.07%
1999	392	+0.77%
2007	441	+1.48%
2012	441	+0.00%
2017	441	+0.00%
2023	469	+1.03%
Source: INSEE

== See also ==
- Blamont
- Communes of the Doubs department
