= Longevelle-sur-Doubs =

- Commune
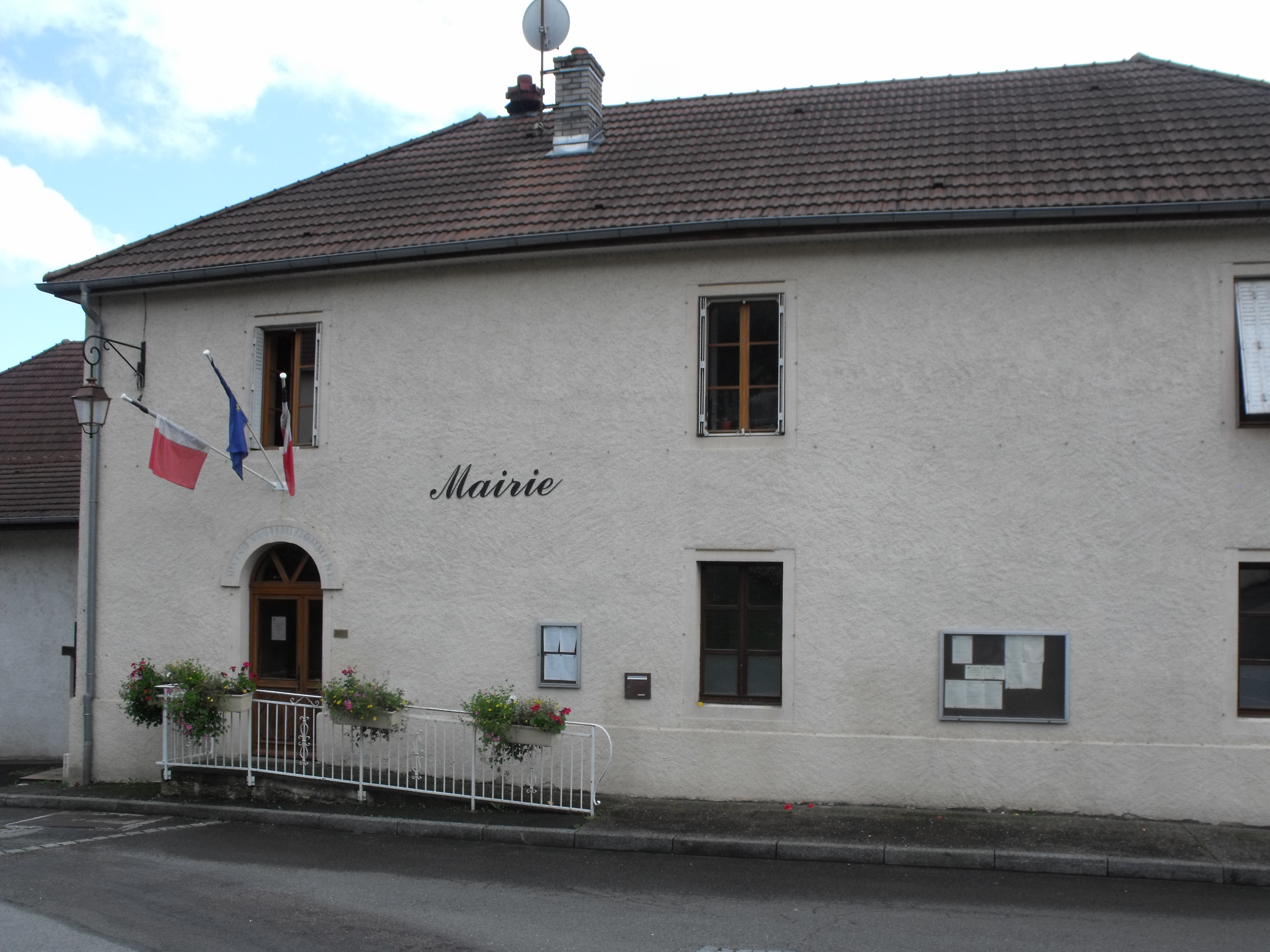
- The town hall in Longevelle-sur-Doubs

- Coat of arms
- Location of Longevelle-sur-Doubs
- Location within France Location within Bourgogne-Franche-Comté
- Coordinates: 47°27′12″N 6°39′07″E
- Country: France
- Region: Bourgogne-Franche-Comté
- Department: Doubs
- Arrondissement: Montbéliard
- Canton: Bavans
- Intercommunality: Pays de Montbéliard Agglomération

Government
  - Mayor (2020–2026): Pierre-Aimé Girardot
- Area^{1}: 8.31 km^{2} (3.21 sq mi)
- Highest elevation: 432 m (1,417 ft)
- Lowest elevation: 295 m (968 ft)
- Population (2023): 646
  - Density: 77.7/km^{2} (201/sq mi)
- Time zone: UTC+01:00 (CET)
  - Summer (DST): UTC+02:00 (CEST)
- INSEE/Postal code: 25345 /25260
- ^{1} French Land Register data, which excludes lakes, ponds, glaciers > 1 km^{2} (0.386 sq mi or 247 acres) and river estuaries.

Longevelle-sur-Doubs (French pronunciation: [lɔ̃ʒvɛl syʁ du], literally Longevelle on Doubs) is a commune in the Doubs department in the Bourgogne-Franche-Comté region in eastern France.

== Population ==
Historical population
Year	Pop.	±% p.a.
1968	448	—
1975	493	+1.38%
1982	493	+0.00%
1990	657	+3.65%
1999	604	−0.93%
2007	631	+0.55%
2012	662	+0.96%
2017	682	+0.60%
2023	646	−0.90%
Source: INSEE

== See also ==
- Doubs (river)
- Communes of the Doubs department
