= Dampjoux =

- Commune
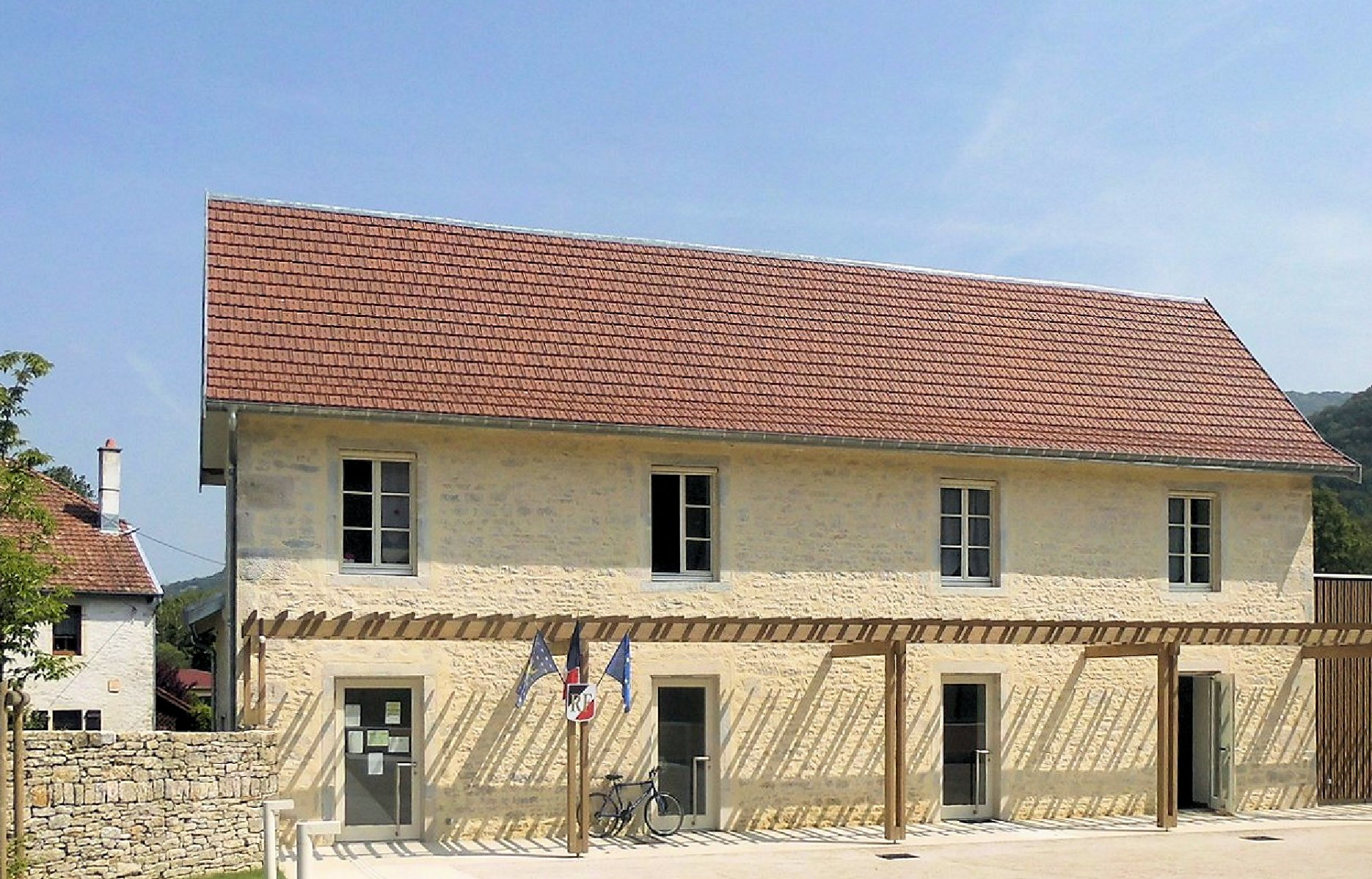
- The town hall in Dampjoux

- Coat of arms
- Location of Dampjoux
- Location within France Location within Bourgogne-Franche-Comté
- Coordinates: 47°20′37″N 6°45′30″E
- Country: France
- Region: Bourgogne-Franche-Comté
- Department: Doubs
- Arrondissement: Montbéliard
- Canton: Maîche
- Intercommunality: Pays de Montbéliard Agglomération

Government
  - Mayor (2020–2026): Philippe Choulet
- Area^{1}: 2.31 km^{2} (0.89 sq mi)
- Highest elevation: 680 m (2,230 ft)
- Lowest elevation: 356 m (1,168 ft)
- Population (2023): 162
  - Density: 70.1/km^{2} (182/sq mi)
- Time zone: UTC+01:00 (CET)
  - Summer (DST): UTC+02:00 (CEST)
- INSEE/Postal code: 25192 /25190
- ^{1} French Land Register data, which excludes lakes, ponds, glaciers > 1 km^{2} (0.386 sq mi or 247 acres) and river estuaries.

Dampjoux (French pronunciation: [dɑ̃ʒu]) is a commune in the Doubs department in the Bourgogne-Franche-Comté region in eastern France.

== Population ==
Historical population
Year	Pop.	±% p.a.
1968	116	—
1975	125	+1.07%
1982	128	+0.34%
1990	113	−1.55%
1999	153	+3.42%
2007	138	−1.28%
2012	169	+4.14%
2017	172	+0.35%
2023	162	−0.99%
Source: INSEE

== See also ==
- Communes of the Doubs department
