= Lougres =

- Commune
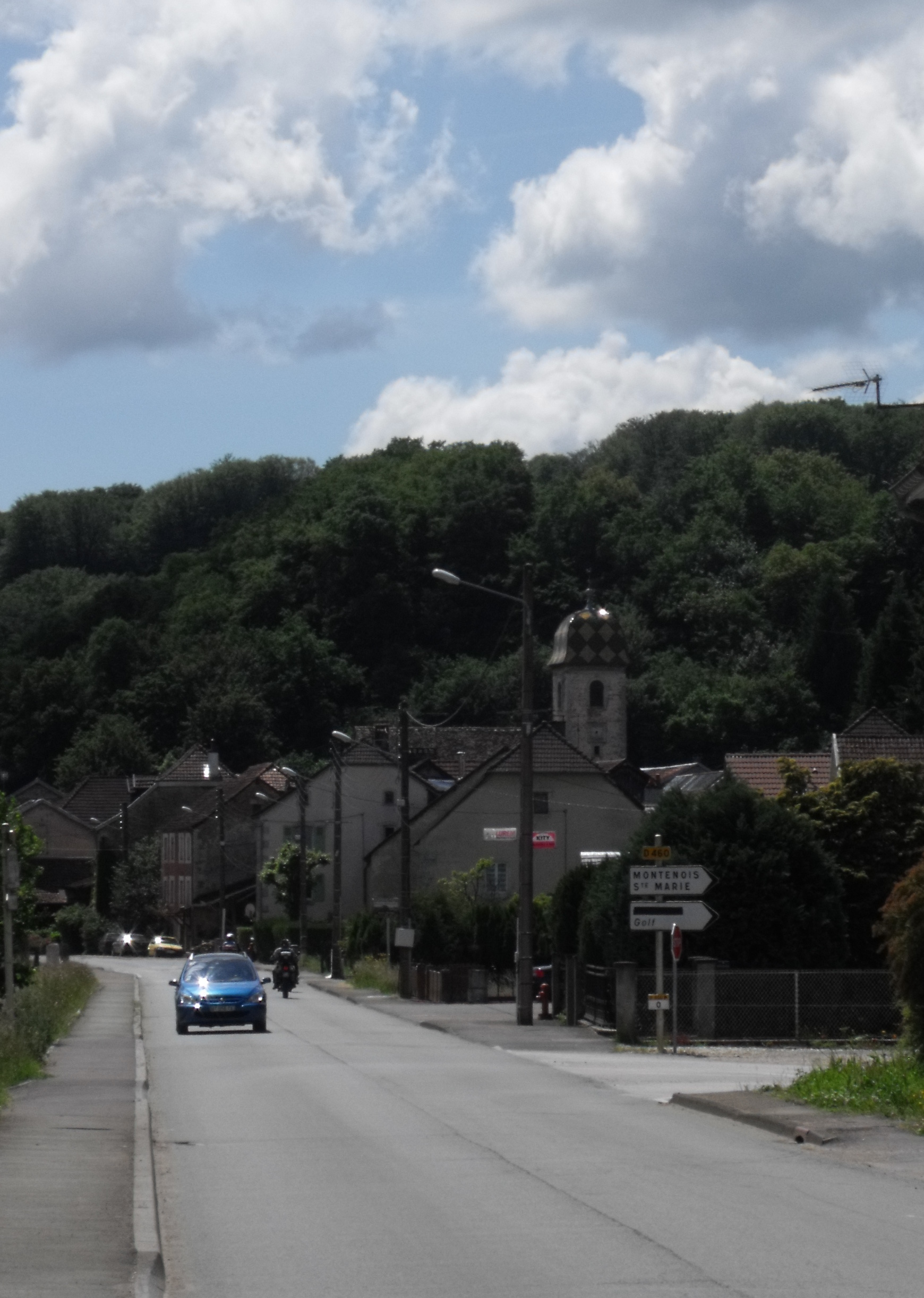
- The Lutheran church in Lougres

- Coat of arms
- Location of Lougres
- Location within France Location within Bourgogne-Franche-Comté
- Coordinates: 47°28′21″N 6°41′15″E
- Country: France
- Region: Bourgogne-Franche-Comté
- Department: Doubs
- Arrondissement: Montbéliard
- Canton: Bavans
- Intercommunality: Pays de Montbéliard Agglomération

Government
  - Mayor (2020–2026): Patrick Froehly
- Area^{1}: 5.97 km^{2} (2.31 sq mi)
- Highest elevation: 440 m (1,440 ft)
- Lowest elevation: 297 m (974 ft)
- Population (2023): 742
  - Density: 124/km^{2} (322/sq mi)
- Time zone: UTC+01:00 (CET)
  - Summer (DST): UTC+02:00 (CEST)
- INSEE/Postal code: 25350 /25260
- ^{1} French Land Register data, which excludes lakes, ponds, glaciers > 1 km^{2} (0.386 sq mi or 247 acres) and river estuaries.

Lougres (French pronunciation: [luɡʁ]) is a commune in the Doubs department in the Bourgogne-Franche-Comté region in eastern France.

== Geography ==
Lougres lies 14 km (8.7 mi) southwest of Montbéliard.

The commune takes its name from the stream that runs through it, from its source to the river Doubs.

== Population ==
Historical population
Year	Pop.	±% p.a.
1968	621	—
1975	713	+1.99%
1982	733	+0.40%
1990	722	−0.19%
1999	683	−0.62%
2007	747	+1.13%
2012	785	+1.00%
2017	765	−0.51%
2023	742	−0.51%
Source: INSEE

== See also ==
- Communes of the Doubs department
