= Sainte-Suzanne, Doubs =

Sainte-Suzanne
- Commune
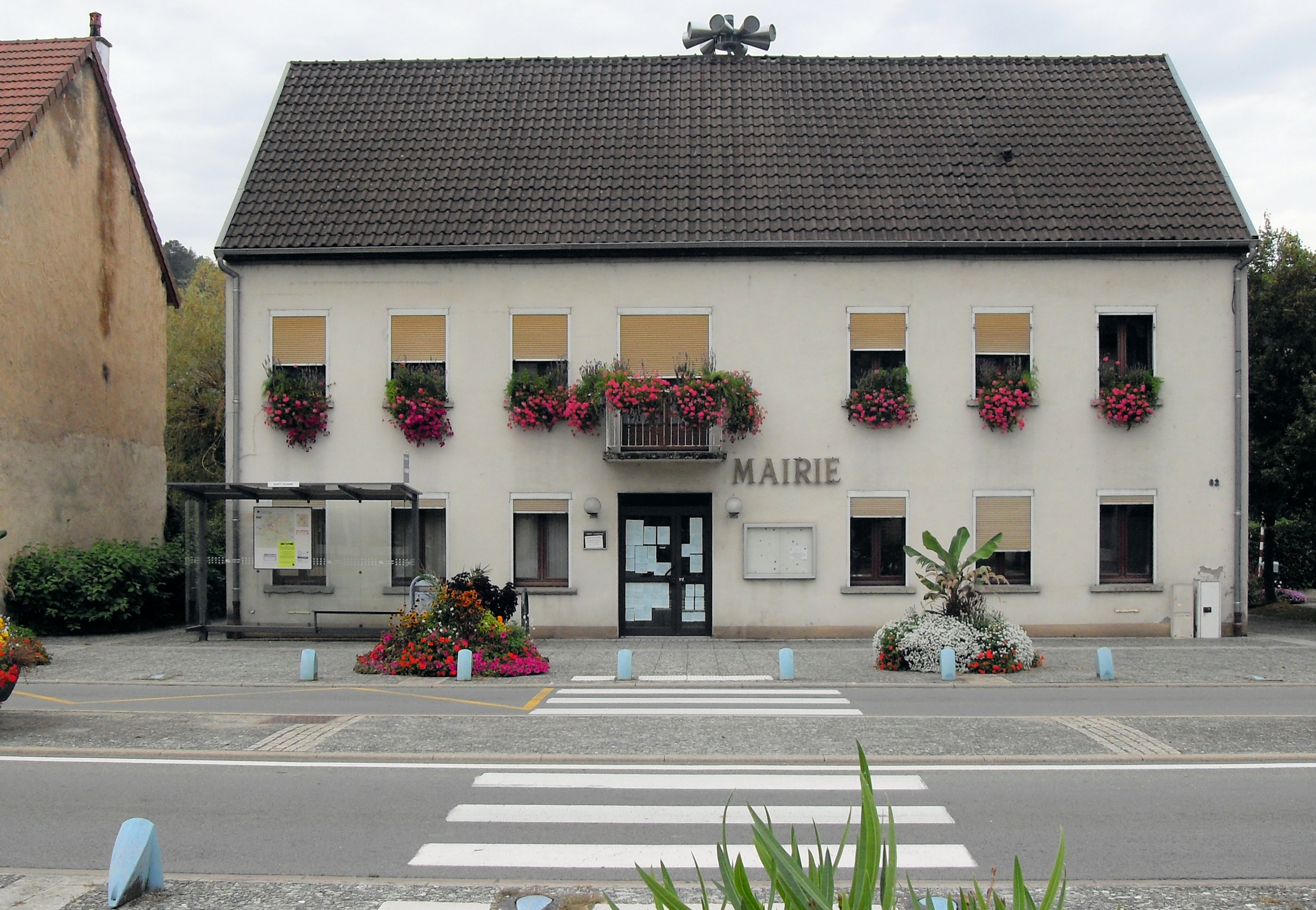
- The town hall in Sainte-Suzanne

- Coat of arms
- Location of Sainte-Suzanne
- Location within France Location within Bourgogne-Franche-Comté
- Coordinates: 47°30′25″N 6°46′24″E
- Country: France
- Region: Bourgogne-Franche-Comté
- Department: Doubs
- Arrondissement: Montbéliard
- Canton: Montbéliard
- Intercommunality: Pays de Montbéliard Agglomération

Government
  - Mayor (2020–2026): Frédéric Tchobanian
- Area^{1}: 1.59 km^{2} (0.61 sq mi)
- Highest elevation: 405 m (1,329 ft)
- Lowest elevation: 310 m (1,020 ft)
- Population (2023): 1,501
  - Density: 944/km^{2} (2,450/sq mi)
- Time zone: UTC+01:00 (CET)
  - Summer (DST): UTC+02:00 (CEST)
- INSEE/Postal code: 25526 /25630
- ^{1} French Land Register data, which excludes lakes, ponds, glaciers > 1 km^{2} (0.386 sq mi or 247 acres) and river estuaries.

Sainte-Suzanne (French pronunciation: [sɛ̃t syzan]) is a commune in the Doubs department in the Bourgogne-Franche-Comté region in eastern France.

== Geography ==
The commune lies 2 km (1.2 mi) southwest of Montbéliard. It forms an arc of which each end rejoins the Allan River.

== Population ==
Historical population
| Year | Pop. | ±% p.a. |
|---|---|---|
| 1968 | 1,429 | — |
| 1975 | 1,448 | +0.19% |
| 1982 | 1,296 | −1.57% |
| 1990 | 1,246 | −0.49% |
| 1999 | 1,349 | +0.89% |
| 2007 | 1,434 | +0.77% |
| 2012 | 1,527 | +1.26% |
| 2017 | 1,510 | −0.22% |
| 2023 | 1,501 | −0.10% |
Source: INSEE

== See also ==
- Communes of the Doubs department
