= Présentevillers =

- Commune
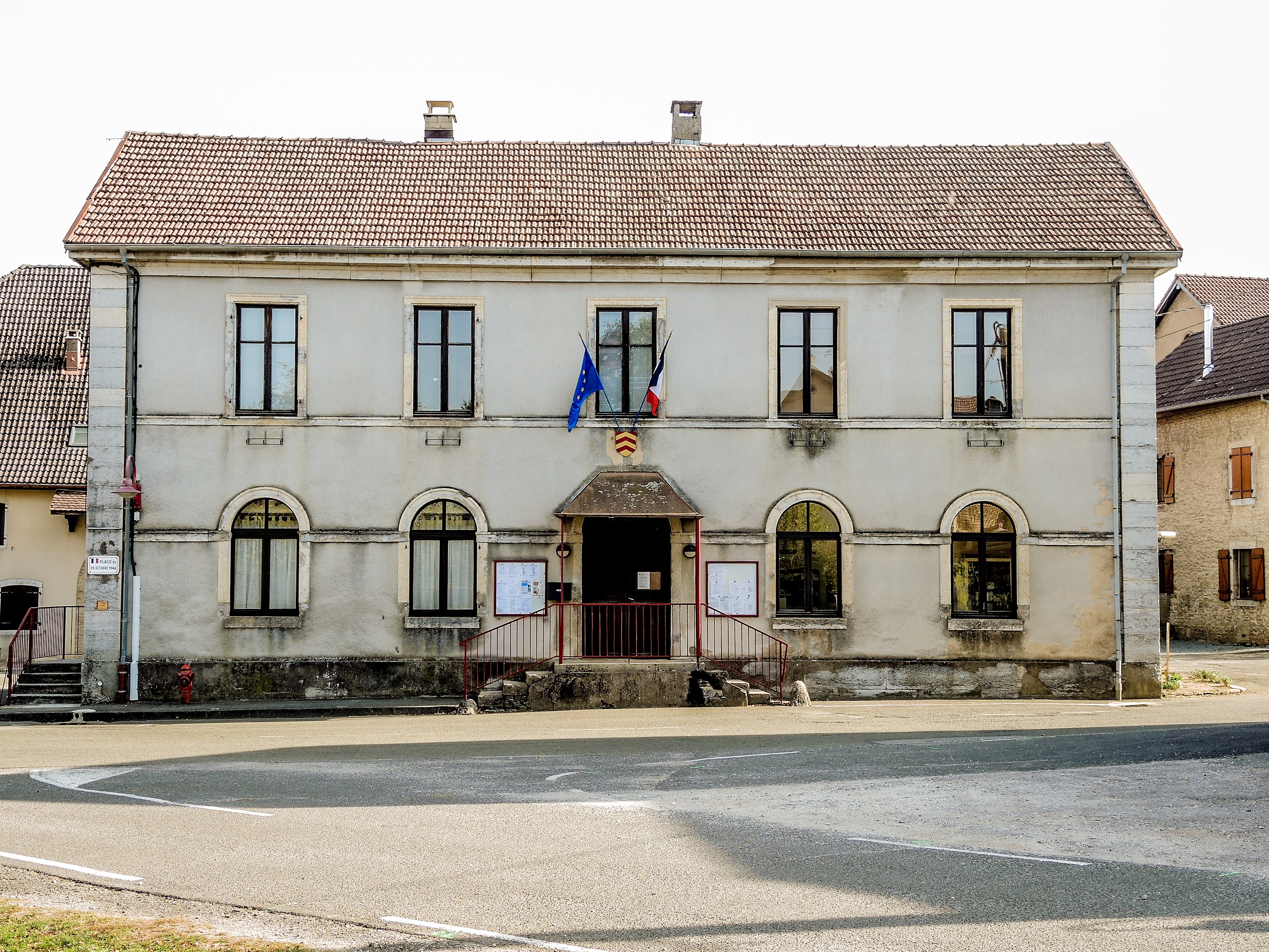
- The town hall in Présentevillers

- Coat of arms
- Location of Présentevillers
- Location within France Location within Bourgogne-Franche-Comté
- Coordinates: 47°30′07″N 6°43′53″E
- Country: France
- Region: Bourgogne-Franche-Comté
- Department: Doubs
- Arrondissement: Montbéliard
- Canton: Bavans
- Intercommunality: Pays de Montbéliard Agglomération

Government
  - Mayor (2020–2026): Philippe Mathieu
- Area^{1}: 3.83 km^{2} (1.48 sq mi)
- Highest elevation: 448 m (1,470 ft)
- Lowest elevation: 330 m (1,080 ft)
- Population (2023): 461
  - Density: 120/km^{2} (312/sq mi)
- Time zone: UTC+01:00 (CET)
  - Summer (DST): UTC+02:00 (CEST)
- INSEE/Postal code: 25469 /25550
- ^{1} French Land Register data, which excludes lakes, ponds, glaciers > 1 km^{2} (0.386 sq mi or 247 acres) and river estuaries.

Présentevillers (French pronunciation: [pʁezɑ̃tvile]) is a commune in the Doubs department in the Bourgogne-Franche-Comté region in eastern France.

== Geography ==
The commune lies 8 km (5.0 mi) west of Montbéliard.

== Population ==
Historical population
Year	Pop.	±% p.a.
1968	309	—
1975	398	+3.68%
1982	514	+3.72%
1990	489	−0.62%
1999	489	+0.00%
2007	476	−0.34%
2012	457	−0.81%
2017	455	−0.09%
2023	461	+0.22%
Source: INSEE

== See also ==
- Communes of the Doubs department
