= Dung, Doubs =

Dung
- Commune
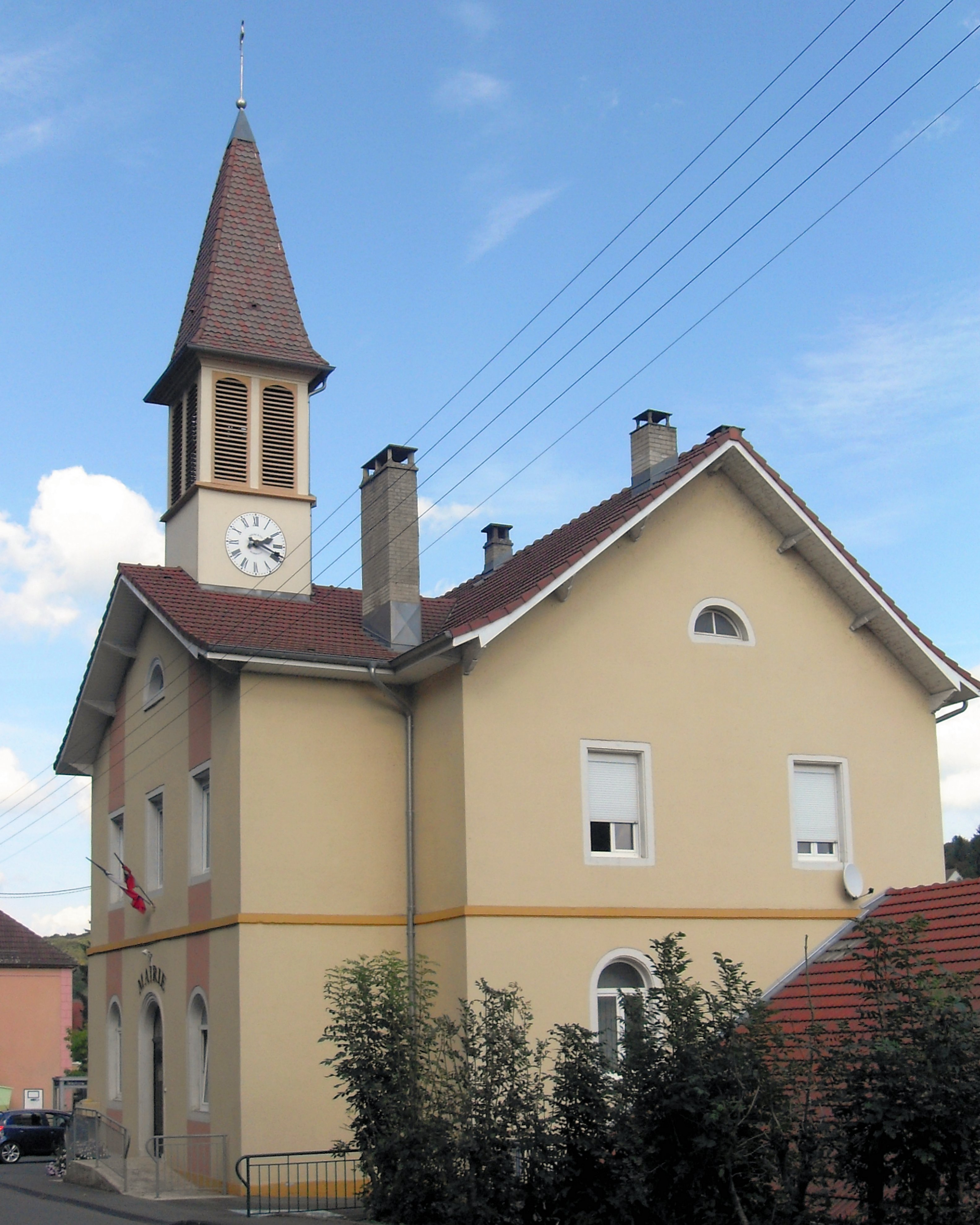
- The town hall in Dung

- Coat of arms
- Location of Dung
- Location within France Location within Bourgogne-Franche-Comté
- Coordinates: 47°30′19″N 6°45′09″E
- Country: France
- Region: Bourgogne-Franche-Comté
- Department: Doubs
- Arrondissement: Montbéliard
- Canton: Bavans
- Intercommunality: Pays de Montbéliard Agglomération

Government
  - Mayor (2020–2026): Philippe Lacroix
- Area^{1}: 3.22 km^{2} (1.24 sq mi)
- Highest elevation: 435 m (1,427 ft)
- Lowest elevation: 320 m (1,050 ft)
- Population (2023): 630
  - Density: 200/km^{2} (510/sq mi)
- Time zone: UTC+01:00 (CET)
  - Summer (DST): UTC+02:00 (CEST)
- INSEE/Postal code: 25207 /25550
- ^{1} French Land Register data, which excludes lakes, ponds, glaciers > 1 km^{2} (0.386 sq mi or 247 acres) and river estuaries.

Dung (French pronunciation: [dœ̃]) is a commune in the Doubs department in the Bourgogne-Franche-Comté region in eastern France.

== Population ==
Historical population
Year	Pop.	±% p.a.
1968	493	—
1975	519	+0.74%
1982	460	−1.71%
1990	518	+1.50%
1999	579	+1.24%
2007	648	+1.42%
2012	649	+0.03%
2017	637	−0.37%
2023	630	−0.18%
Source: INSEE

== See also ==
- Communes of the Doubs department
