= Sainte-Marie, Doubs =

Sainte-Marie
- Commune
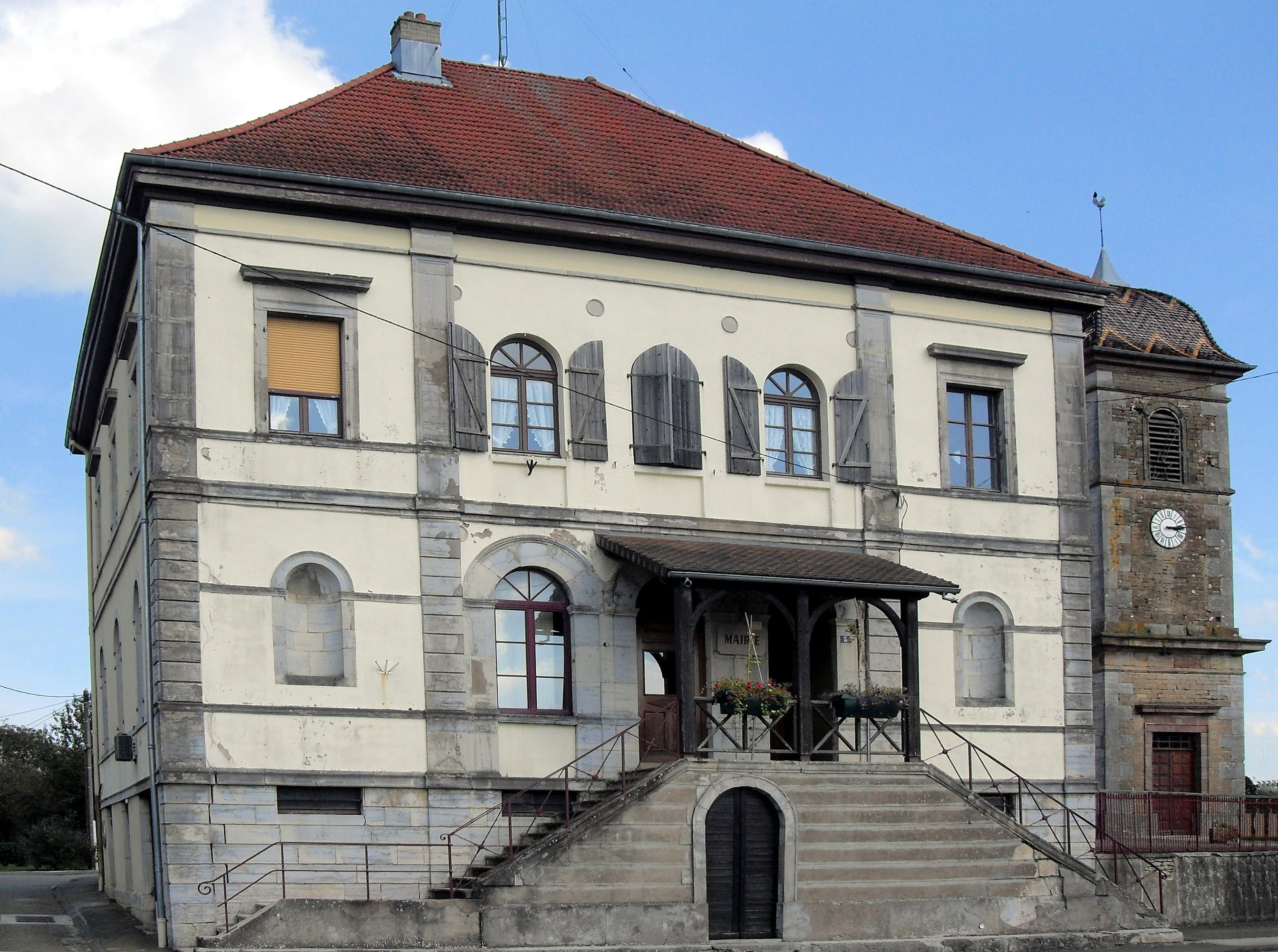
- The town hall in Sainte-Marie

- Coat of arms
- Location of Sainte-Marie
- Location within France Location within Bourgogne-Franche-Comté
- Coordinates: 47°30′29″N 6°41′46″E
- Country: France
- Region: Bourgogne-Franche-Comté
- Department: Doubs
- Arrondissement: Montbéliard
- Canton: Bavans
- Intercommunality: Pays de Montbéliard Agglomération

Government
  - Mayor (2020–2026): Gérald Grosclaude
- Area^{1}: 7.17 km^{2} (2.77 sq mi)
- Highest elevation: 449 m (1,473 ft)
- Lowest elevation: 327 m (1,073 ft)
- Population (2023): 648
  - Density: 90.4/km^{2} (234/sq mi)
- Time zone: UTC+01:00 (CET)
  - Summer (DST): UTC+02:00 (CEST)
- INSEE/Postal code: 25523 /25113
- ^{1} French Land Register data, which excludes lakes, ponds, glaciers > 1 km^{2} (0.386 sq mi or 247 acres) and river estuaries.

Sainte-Marie (French pronunciation: [sɛ̃t maʁi]) is a commune in the Doubs department in the Bourgogne-Franche-Comté region in eastern France.

== Geography ==
The commune lies 10 km (6.2 mi) northwest of Montbéliard.

== Population ==
Historical population
Year	Pop.	±% p.a.
1968	446	—
1975	551	+3.07%
1982	646	+2.30%
1990	678	+0.61%
1999	698	+0.32%
2007	721	+0.41%
2012	736	+0.41%
2017	685	−1.43%
2023	648	−0.92%
Source: INSEE

== See also ==
- Communes of the Doubs department
