= Abbévillers =

- Commune
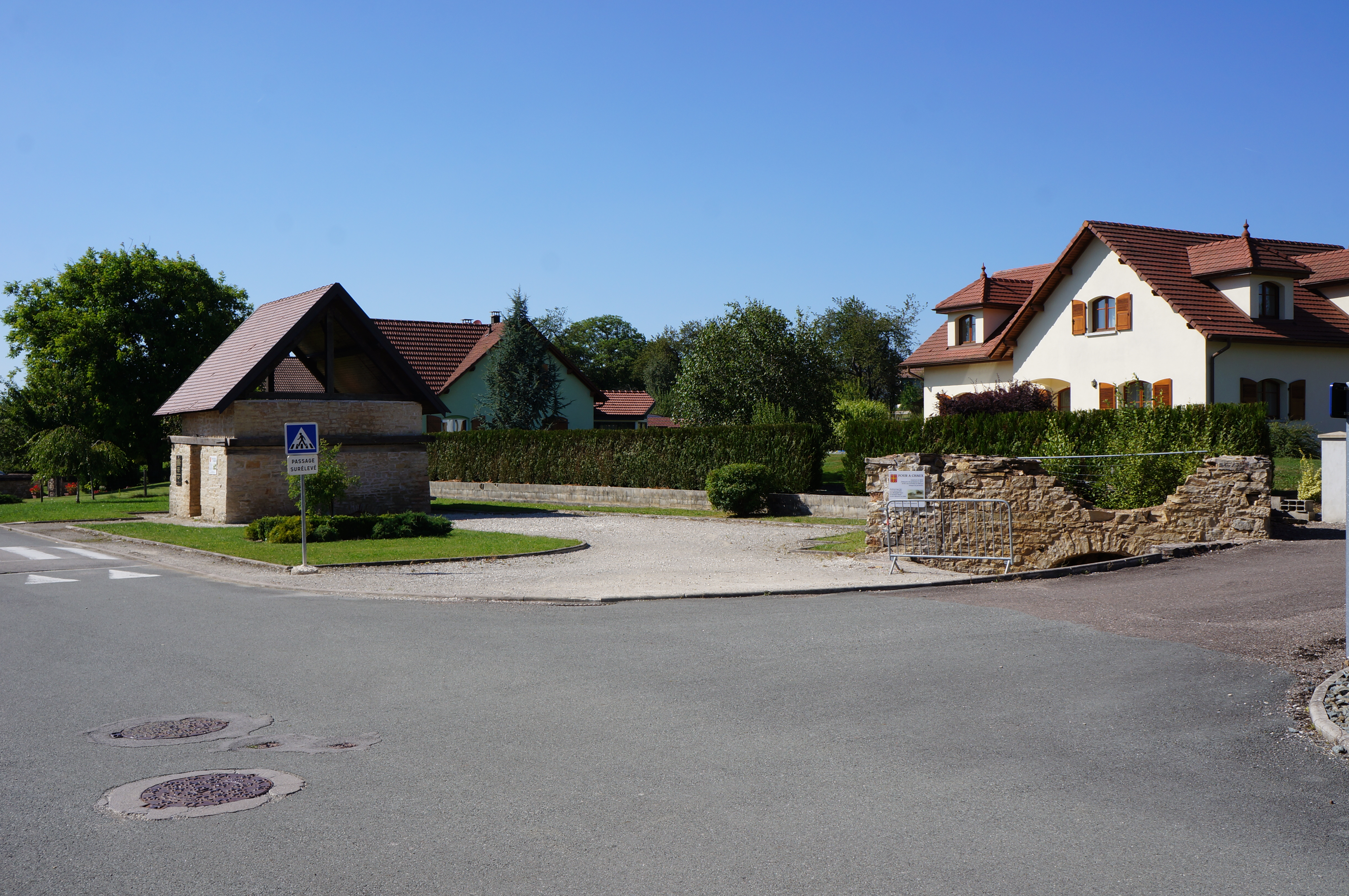
- The ovens in Abbévillers

- Coat of arms
- Location of Abbévillers
- Location within France Location within Bourgogne-Franche-Comté
- Coordinates: 47°25′51″N 6°55′08″E
- Country: France
- Region: Bourgogne-Franche-Comté
- Department: Doubs
- Arrondissement: Montbéliard
- Canton: Maîche
- Intercommunality: Pays de Montbéliard Agglomération

Government
  - Mayor (2020–2026): Joël Vernier
- Area^{1}: 11.18 km^{2} (4.32 sq mi)
- Highest elevation: 612 m (2,008 ft)
- Lowest elevation: 427 m (1,401 ft)
- Population (2023): 1,071
  - Density: 95.80/km^{2} (248.1/sq mi)
- Demonym(s): Abbévillerois, Abbévilleroises
- Time zone: UTC+01:00 (CET)
  - Summer (DST): UTC+02:00 (CEST)
- INSEE/Postal code: 25004 /25310
- ^{1} French Land Register data, which excludes lakes, ponds, glaciers > 1 km^{2} (0.386 sq mi or 247 acres) and river estuaries.

Abbévillers is a commune in the Doubs department in the Bourgogne-Franche-Comté region in eastern France.

== Population ==
Historical population

Year	Pop.	±% p.a.
1793	317	—
1800	357	+1.71%
1806	337	−0.96%
1821	444	+1.86%
1831	436	−0.18%
1836	422	−0.65%
1841	465	+1.96%
1846	472	+0.30%
1851	491	+0.79%
1856	450	−1.73%
1861	450	+0.00%
1866	479	+1.26%
1872	468	−0.39%
1876	476	+0.42%
1881	499	+0.95%
1886	510	+0.44%
1891	486	−0.96%
1896	467	−0.79%
1901	485	+0.76%

Year	Pop.	±% p.a.
1906	479	−0.25%
1911	458	−0.89%
1921	400	−1.34%
1926	414	+0.69%
1931	390	−1.19%
1936	342	−2.59%
1946	332	−0.30%
1954	344	+0.44%
1962	342	−0.07%
1968	405	+2.86%
1975	570	+5.00%
1982	760	+4.20%
1990	817	+0.91%
1999	877	+0.79%
2007	1,018	+1.88%
2012	1,064	+0.89%
2017	1,040	−0.46%
2023	1,071	+0.49%

Source: EHESS (1793-1999) and INSEE

== See also ==
- Communes of the Doubs department
