= Étouvans =

- Commune
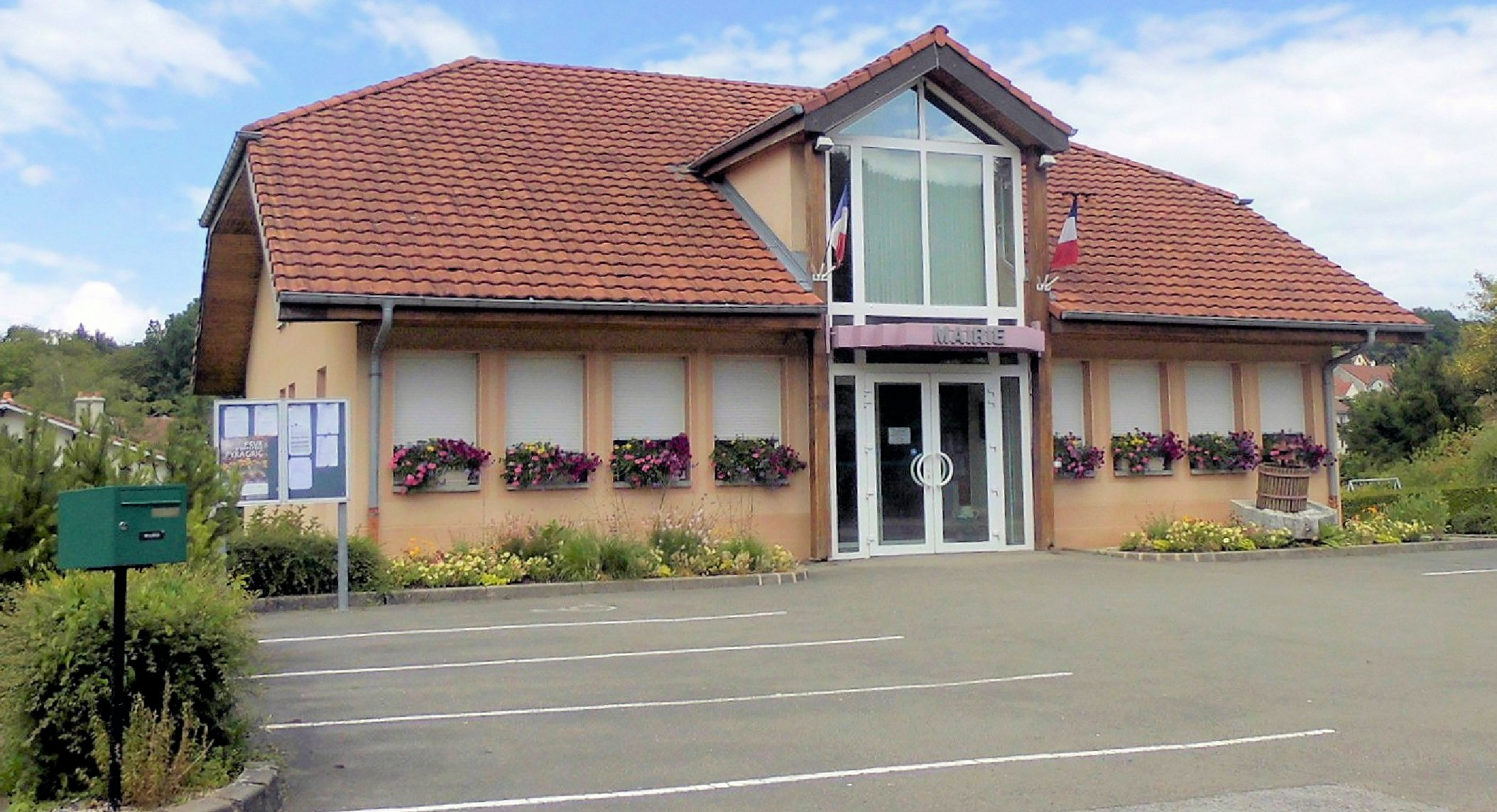
- The town hall in Étouvans

- Coat of arms
- Location of Étouvans
- Location within France Location within Bourgogne-Franche-Comté
- Coordinates: 47°27′54″N 6°43′13″E
- Country: France
- Region: Bourgogne-Franche-Comté
- Department: Doubs
- Arrondissement: Montbéliard
- Canton: Bavans
- Intercommunality: Pays de Montbéliard Agglomération

Government
  - Mayor (2024–2026): Xavier Bartolo
- Area^{1}: 6.56 km^{2} (2.53 sq mi)
- Highest elevation: 476 m (1,562 ft)
- Lowest elevation: 301 m (988 ft)
- Population (2023): 823
  - Density: 125/km^{2} (325/sq mi)
- Time zone: UTC+01:00 (CET)
  - Summer (DST): UTC+02:00 (CEST)
- INSEE/Postal code: 25224 /25260
- ^{1} French Land Register data, which excludes lakes, ponds, glaciers > 1 km^{2} (0.386 sq mi or 247 acres) and river estuaries.

Étouvans (French pronunciation: [etuvɑ̃]) is a commune in the Doubs department in the Bourgogne-Franche-Comté region in eastern France.

== Population ==
Historical population
Year	Pop.	±% p.a.
1968	624	—
1975	746	+2.58%
1982	891	+2.57%
1990	760	−1.97%
1999	721	−0.58%
2007	760	+0.66%
2012	758	−0.05%
2017	825	+1.71%
2023	823	−0.04%
Source: INSEE

== See also ==
- Communes of the Doubs department
