= Bavans =

- Commune
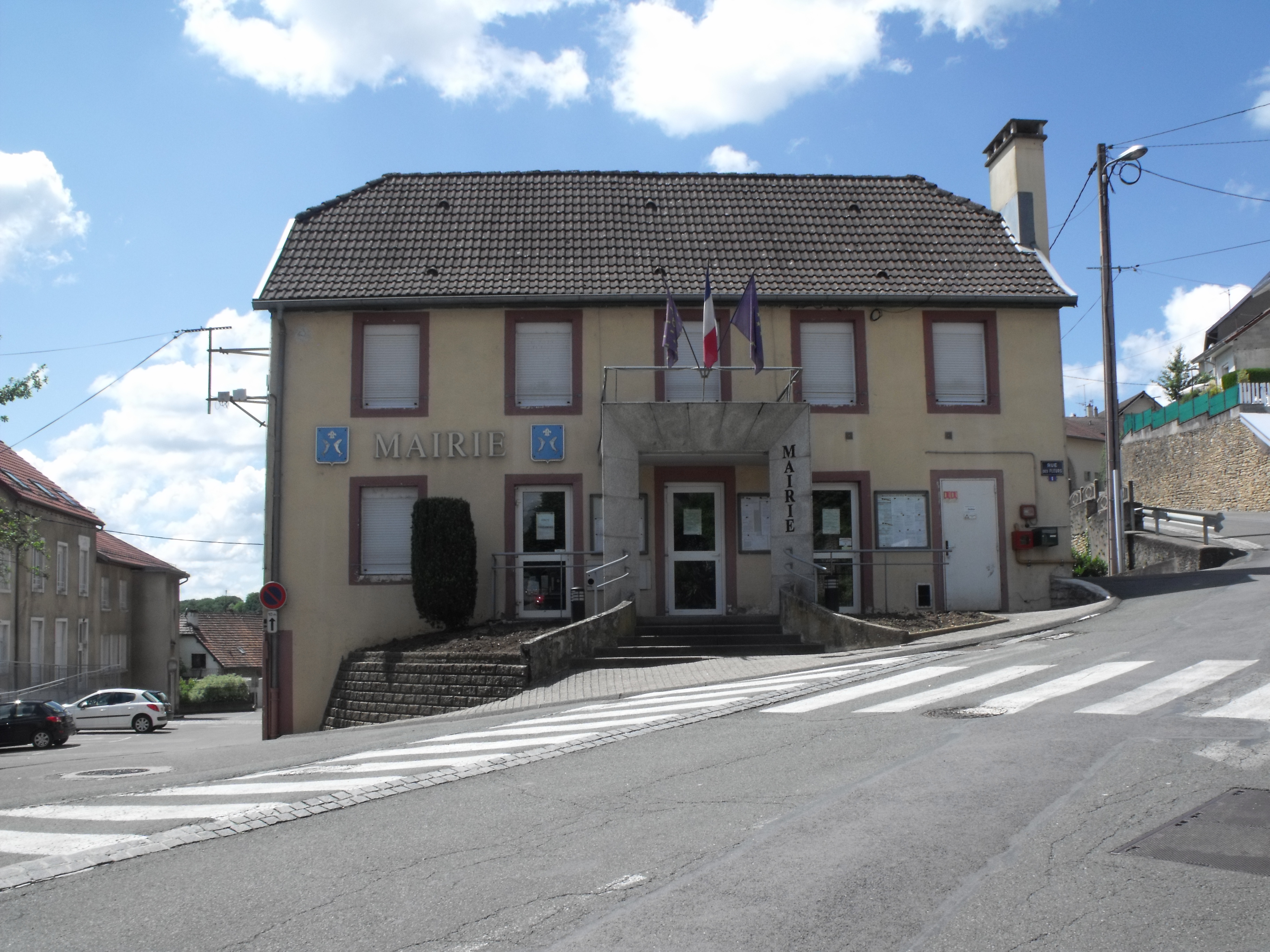
- The town hall in Bavans

- Coat of arms
- Location of Bavans
- Location within France Location within Bourgogne-Franche-Comté
- Coordinates: 47°28′57″N 6°43′53″E
- Country: France
- Region: Bourgogne-Franche-Comté
- Department: Doubs
- Arrondissement: Montbéliard
- Canton: Bavans
- Intercommunality: Pays de Montbéliard Agglomération

Government
  - Mayor (2020–2026): Sophie Radreau
- Area^{1}: 8.83 km^{2} (3.41 sq mi)
- Highest elevation: 487 m (1,598 ft)
- Lowest elevation: 300 m (980 ft)
- Population (2023): 3,582
  - Density: 406/km^{2} (1,050/sq mi)
- Time zone: UTC+01:00 (CET)
  - Summer (DST): UTC+02:00 (CEST)
- INSEE/Postal code: 25048 /25550
- ^{1} French Land Register data, which excludes lakes, ponds, glaciers > 1 km^{2} (0.386 sq mi or 247 acres) and river estuaries.

Bavans (French pronunciation: [bavɑ̃]) is a commune in the Doubs department in the Bourgogne-Franche-Comté region in eastern France.

== Population ==
Historical population
| Year | Pop. | ±% p.a. |
|---|---|---|
| 1968 | 2,594 | — |
| 1975 | 3,754 | +5.42% |
| 1982 | 4,148 | +1.44% |
| 1990 | 4,144 | −0.01% |
| 1999 | 3,917 | −0.62% |
| 2007 | 3,573 | −1.14% |
| 2012 | 3,736 | +0.90% |
| 2017 | 3,640 | −0.52% |
| 2023 | 3,582 | −0.27% |
Source: INSEE

== See also ==
- Communes of the Doubs department
