= Raynans =

- Commune
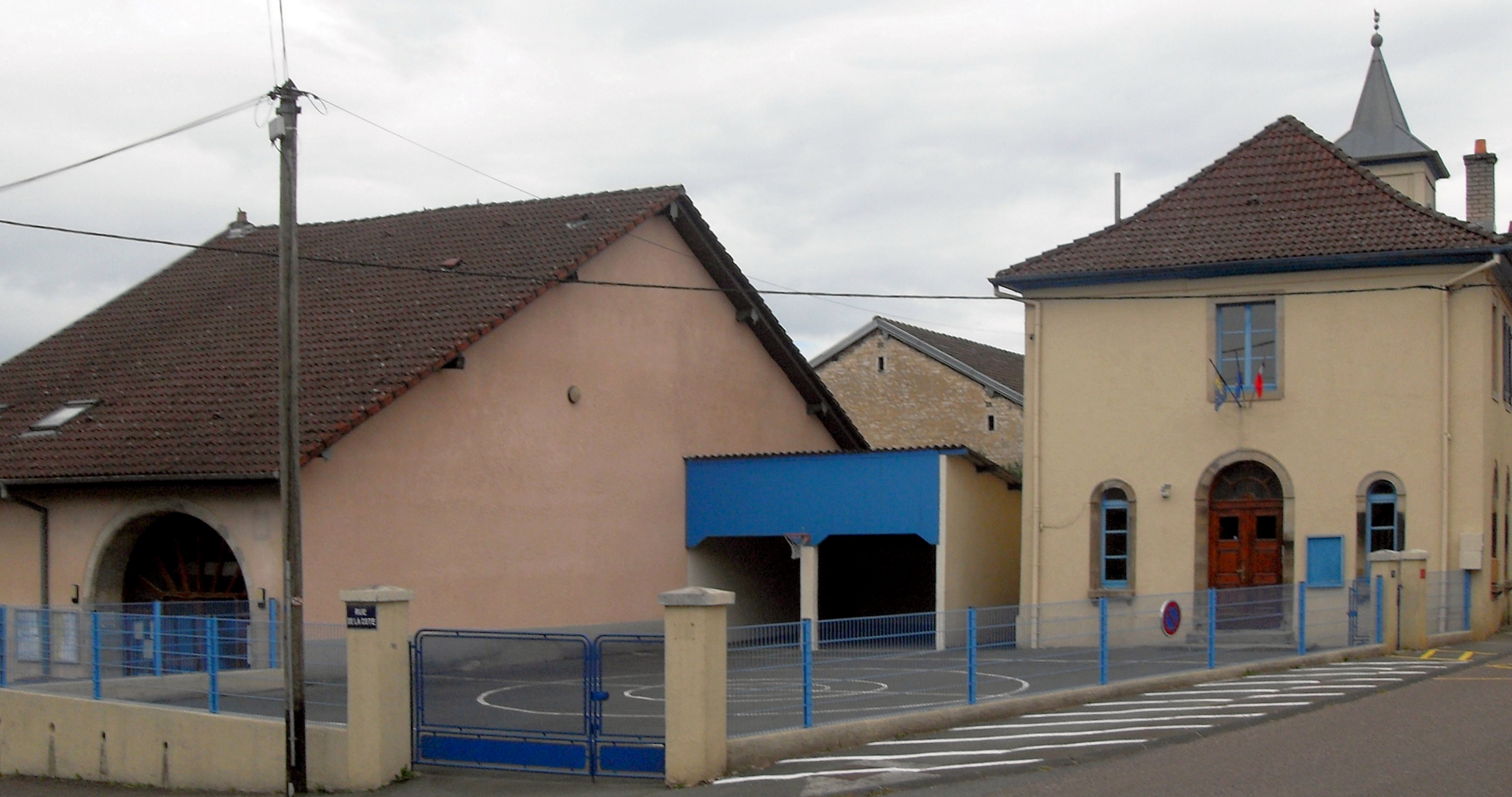
- The town hall and school in Raynans

- Coat of arms
- Location of Raynans
- Location within France Location within Bourgogne-Franche-Comté
- Coordinates: 47°32′02″N 6°43′11″E
- Country: France
- Region: Bourgogne-Franche-Comté
- Department: Doubs
- Arrondissement: Montbéliard
- Canton: Bavans
- Intercommunality: Pays de Montbéliard Agglomération

Government
  - Mayor (2024–2026): Gilles Rigoulot
- Area^{1}: 4.03 km^{2} (1.56 sq mi)
- Highest elevation: 425 m (1,394 ft)
- Lowest elevation: 337 m (1,106 ft)
- Population (2023): 338
  - Density: 83.9/km^{2} (217/sq mi)
- Time zone: UTC+01:00 (CET)
  - Summer (DST): UTC+02:00 (CEST)
- INSEE/Postal code: 25481 /25550
- ^{1} French Land Register data, which excludes lakes, ponds, glaciers > 1 km^{2} (0.386 sq mi or 247 acres) and river estuaries.

Raynans (French pronunciation: [ʁɛnɑ̃]; formerly in German: Renach) is a commune in the Doubs department in the Bourgogne-Franche-Comté region in eastern France.

== Population ==
Historical population
Year	Pop.	±% p.a.
1968	121	—
1975	132	+1.25%
1982	202	+6.27%
1990	203	+0.06%
1999	233	+1.54%
2007	310	+3.63%
2012	308	−0.13%
2017	337	+1.82%
2023	338	+0.05%
Source: INSEE

== See also ==
- Communes of the Doubs department
