= Fesches-le-Châtel =

- Commune
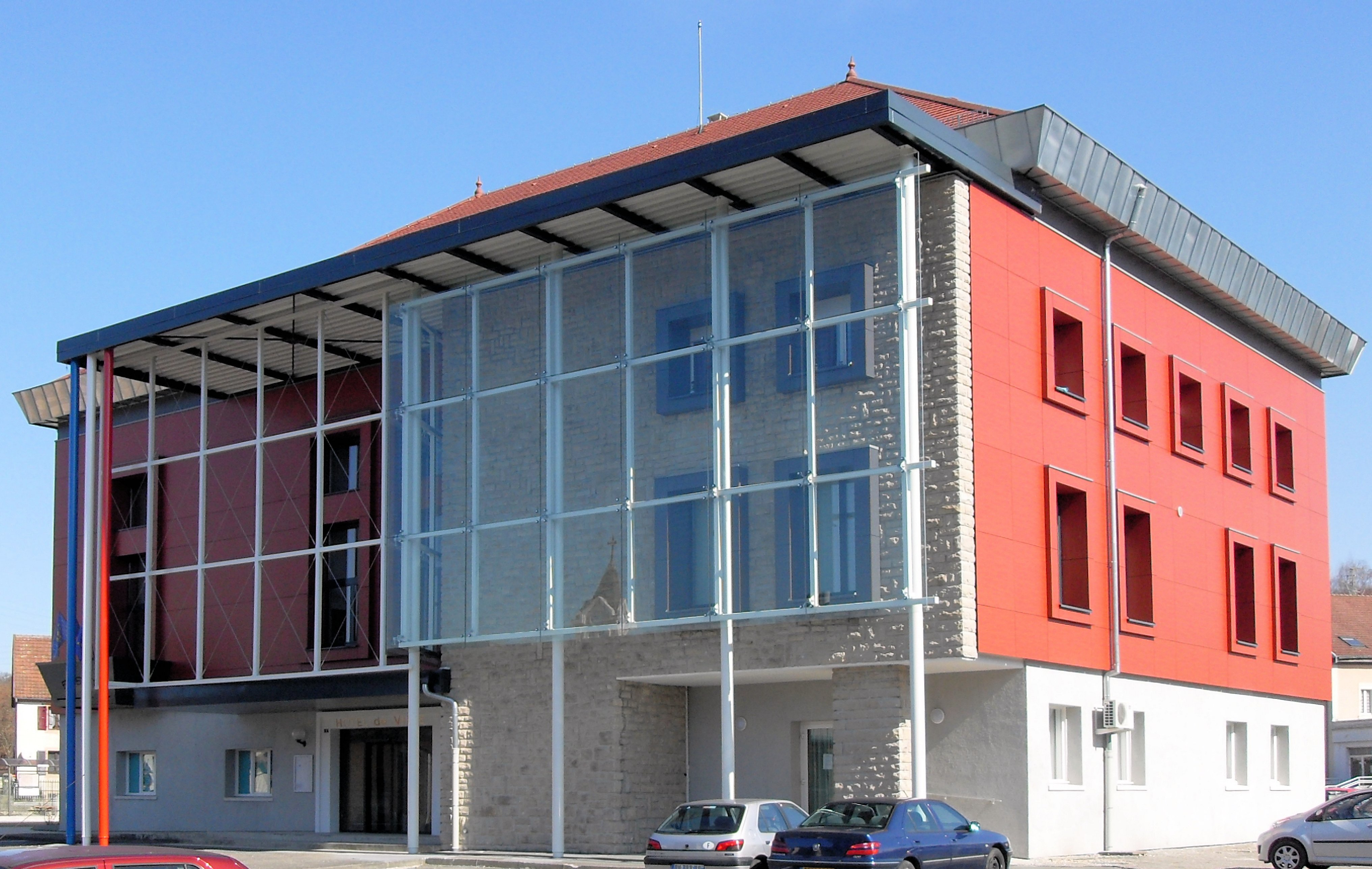
- The town hall in Fesches-le-Châtel

- Coat of arms
- Location of Fesches-le-Châtel
- Location within France Location within Bourgogne-Franche-Comté
- Coordinates: 47°31′29″N 6°54′27″E
- Country: France
- Region: Bourgogne-Franche-Comté
- Department: Doubs
- Arrondissement: Montbéliard
- Canton: Bethoncourt
- Intercommunality: Pays de Montbéliard Agglomération

Government
  - Mayor (2020–2026): Charles Demouge
- Area^{1}: 3.46 km^{2} (1.34 sq mi)
- Highest elevation: 403 m (1,322 ft)
- Lowest elevation: 322 m (1,056 ft)
- Population (2023): 2,129
  - Density: 615/km^{2} (1,590/sq mi)
- Time zone: UTC+01:00 (CET)
  - Summer (DST): UTC+02:00 (CEST)
- INSEE/Postal code: 25237 /25490
- ^{1} French Land Register data, which excludes lakes, ponds, glaciers > 1 km^{2} (0.386 sq mi or 247 acres) and river estuaries.

Fesches-le-Châtel (French pronunciation: [fɛːʃ lə ʃɑtɛl]) is a commune in the Doubs department in the Bourgogne-Franche-Comté region in eastern France.

== Population ==
Historical population
Year	Pop.	±% p.a.
1968	2,346	—
1975	2,288	−0.36%
1982	2,263	−0.16%
1990	2,118	−0.82%
1999	2,167	+0.25%
2007	2,235	+0.39%
2012	2,261	+0.23%
2017	2,189	−0.65%
2023	2,129	−0.46%
Source: INSEE

== See also ==
- Communes of the Doubs department
