= Semondans =

- Commune
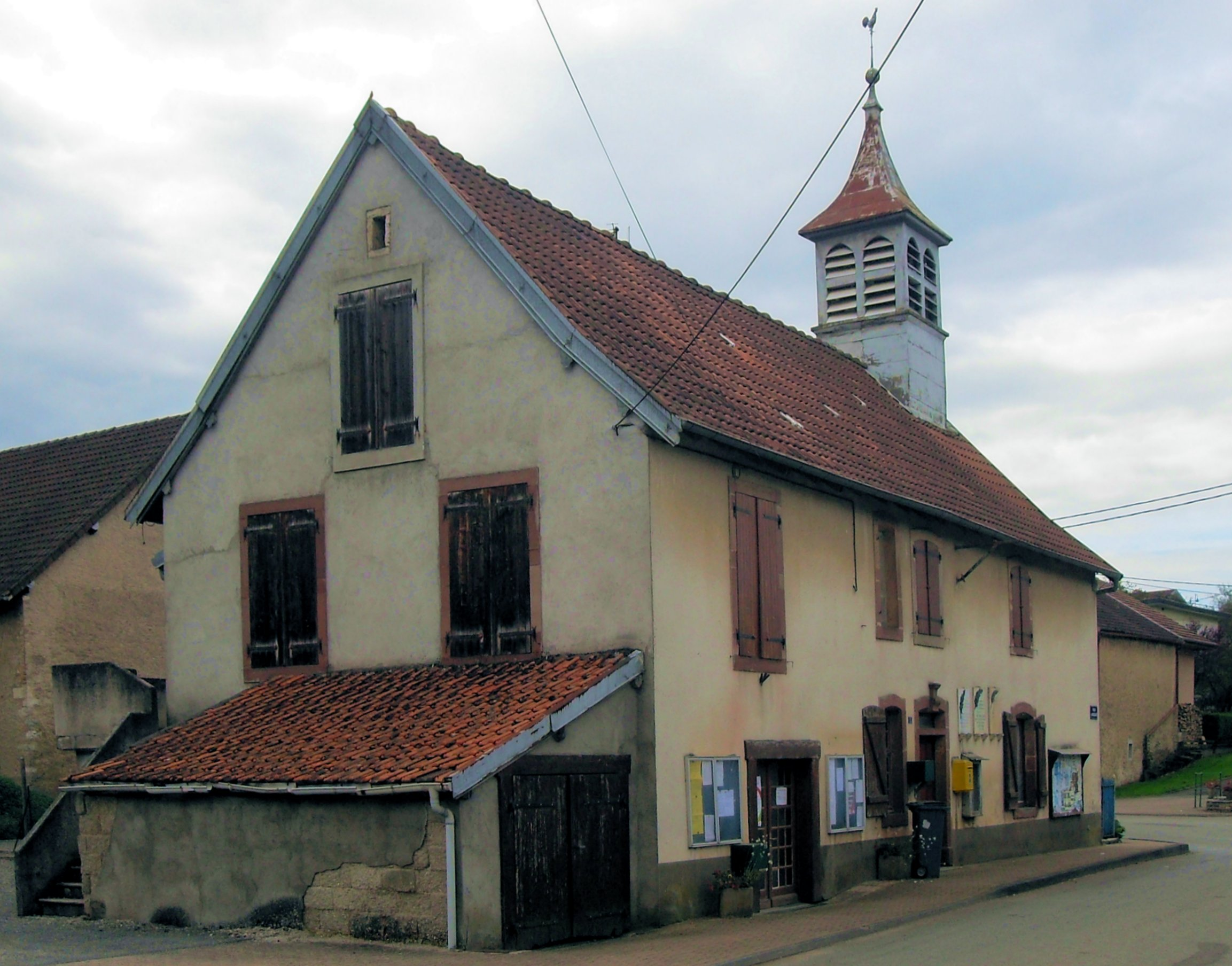
- The town hall and school in Semondans

- Coat of arms
- Location of Semondans
- Location within France Location within Bourgogne-Franche-Comté
- Coordinates: 47°32′37″N 6°41′37″E
- Country: France
- Region: Bourgogne-Franche-Comté
- Department: Doubs
- Arrondissement: Montbéliard
- Canton: Bavans
- Intercommunality: Pays de Montbéliard Agglomération

Government
  - Mayor (2020–2026): Pascal Pavillard
- Area^{1}: 2.77 km^{2} (1.07 sq mi)
- Highest elevation: 450 m (1,480 ft)
- Lowest elevation: 344 m (1,129 ft)
- Population (2023): 301
  - Density: 109/km^{2} (281/sq mi)
- Time zone: UTC+01:00 (CET)
  - Summer (DST): UTC+02:00 (CEST)
- INSEE/Postal code: 25540 /25750
- ^{1} French Land Register data, which excludes lakes, ponds, glaciers > 1 km^{2} (0.386 sq mi or 247 acres) and river estuaries.

Semondans (French pronunciation: [səmɔ̃dɑ̃]) is a commune in the Doubs department in the Bourgogne-Franche-Comté region in eastern France.

== Geography ==
Semondan lies 8.5 km (5.3 mi) southwest of Montbéliard. The Rupt flows through the commune.

== Population ==
Historical population
Year	Pop.	±% p.a.
1968	128	—
1975	235	+9.07%
1982	230	−0.31%
1990	233	+0.16%
1999	236	+0.14%
2007	311	+3.51%
2012	306	−0.32%
2017	302	−0.26%
2023	301	−0.06%
Source: INSEE

== See also ==
- Communes of the Doubs department
