= Saint-Julien-lès-Montbéliard =

- Commune
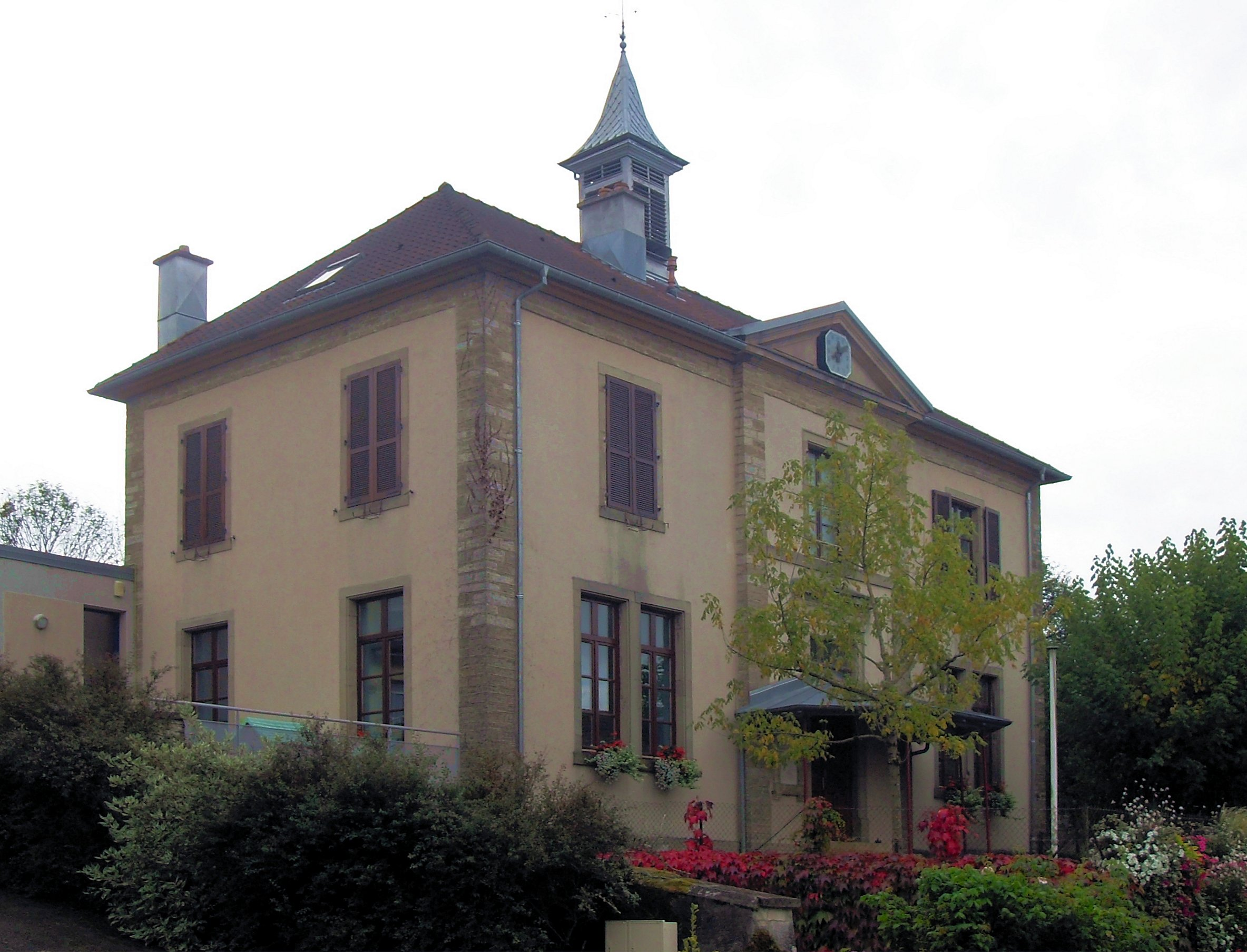
- The town hall in Saint-Julien-lès-Montbéliard

- Coat of arms
- Location of Saint-Julien-lès-Montbéliard
- Location within France Location within Bourgogne-Franche-Comté
- Coordinates: 47°31′23″N 6°42′41″E
- Country: France
- Region: Bourgogne-Franche-Comté
- Department: Doubs
- Arrondissement: Montbéliard
- Canton: Bavans
- Intercommunality: Pays de Montbéliard Agglomération

Government
  - Mayor (2020–2026): Laurence Devaux
- Area^{1}: 3.81 km^{2} (1.47 sq mi)
- Highest elevation: 447 m (1,467 ft)
- Lowest elevation: 344 m (1,129 ft)
- Population (2023): 158
  - Density: 41.5/km^{2} (107/sq mi)
- Time zone: UTC+01:00 (CET)
  - Summer (DST): UTC+02:00 (CEST)
- INSEE/Postal code: 25521 /25550
- ^{1} French Land Register data, which excludes lakes, ponds, glaciers > 1 km^{2} (0.386 sq mi or 247 acres) and river estuaries.

Saint-Julien-lès-Montbéliard (French pronunciation: [sɛ̃ ʒyljɛ̃ lɛ mɔ̃beljaʁ], literally Saint-Julien near Montbéliard) is a commune in the Doubs department in the Bourgogne-Franche-Comté region in eastern France.

== Geography ==
The commune lies 8 km (5.0 mi) west of Montbéliard.

== Population ==
Historical population
| Year | Pop. | ±% p.a. |
|---|---|---|
| 1968 | 102 | — |
| 1975 | 122 | +2.59% |
| 1982 | 153 | +3.29% |
| 1990 | 174 | +1.62% |
| 1999 | 173 | −0.06% |
| 2007 | 173 | +0.00% |
| 2012 | 170 | −0.35% |
| 2017 | 165 | −0.60% |
| 2023 | 158 | −0.72% |
Source: INSEE

== See also ==
- Communes of the Doubs department
