= Issans =

- Commune
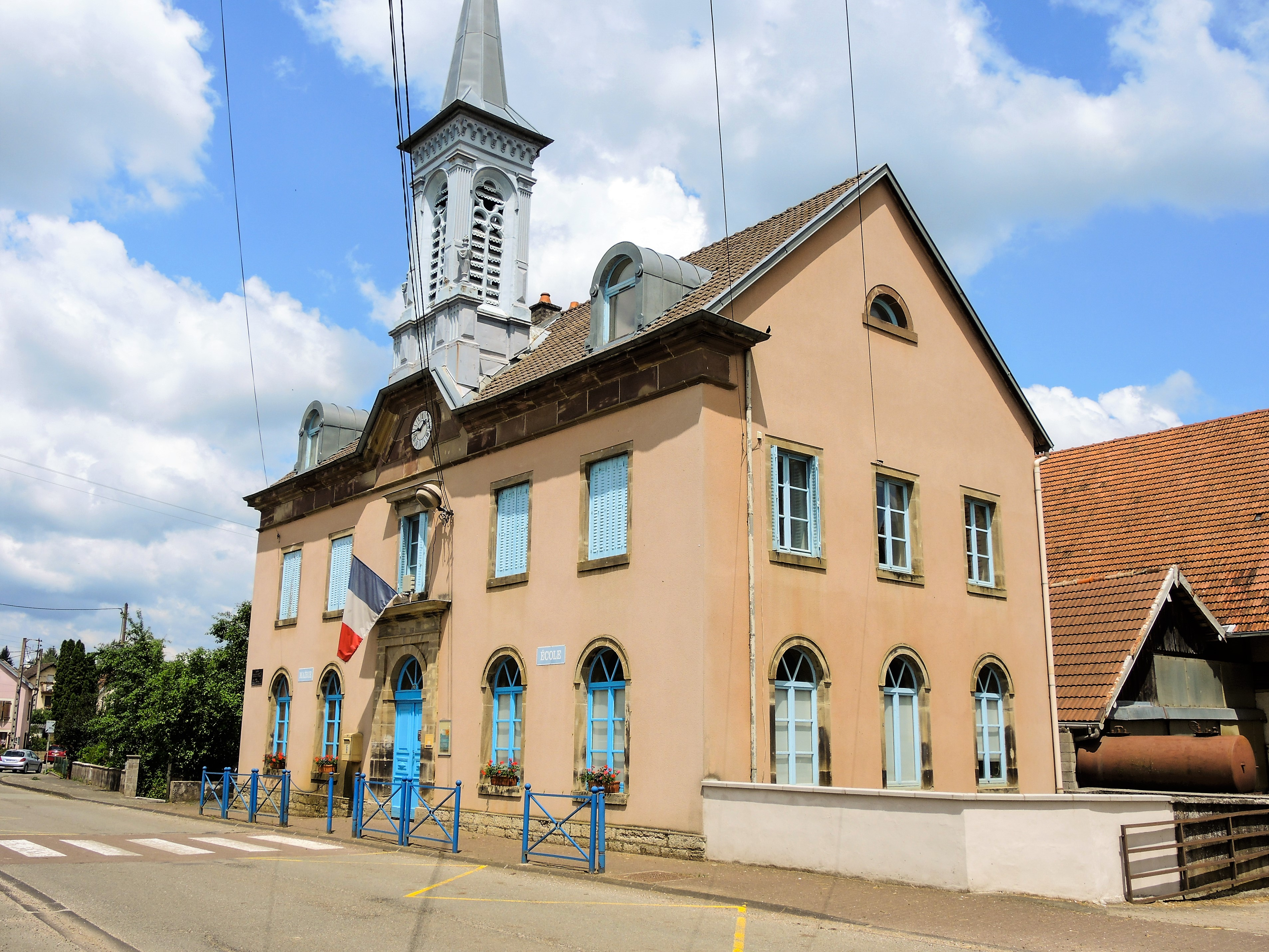
- The town hall in Issans

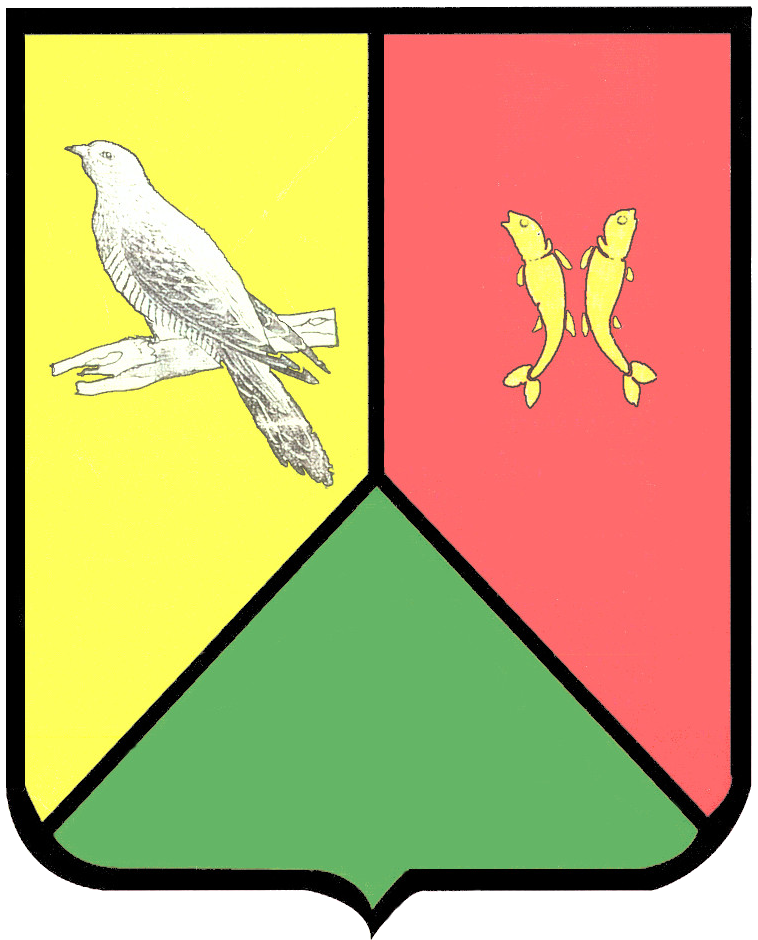
- Coat of arms
- Location of Issans
- Location within France Location within Bourgogne-Franche-Comté
- Coordinates: 47°31′42″N 6°43′43″E
- Country: France
- Region: Bourgogne-Franche-Comté
- Department: Doubs
- Arrondissement: Montbéliard
- Canton: Bavans
- Intercommunality: Pays de Montbéliard Agglomération

Government
  - Mayor (2020–2026): Gaston Chenu
- Area^{1}: 2.72 km^{2} (1.05 sq mi)
- Highest elevation: 432 m (1,417 ft)
- Lowest elevation: 330 m (1,080 ft)
- Population (2023): 239
  - Density: 87.9/km^{2} (228/sq mi)
- Time zone: UTC+01:00 (CET)
  - Summer (DST): UTC+02:00 (CEST)
- INSEE/Postal code: 25316 /25550
- ^{1} French Land Register data, which excludes lakes, ponds, glaciers > 1 km^{2} (0.386 sq mi or 247 acres) and river estuaries.

Issans (French pronunciation: [isɑ̃]) is a commune in the Doubs department in the Bourgogne-Franche-Comté region in eastern France.

== Geography ==
The village is situated in the small valley of the Rupt 6 km (3.7 mi) from Montbéliard.

== Population ==
Historical population
Year	Pop.	±% p.a.
1968	99	—
1975	199	+10.49%
1982	264	+4.12%
1990	266	+0.09%
1999	275	+0.37%
2007	250	−1.18%
2012	260	+0.79%
2017	238	−1.75%
2023	239	+0.07%
Source: INSEE

== Economy ==
The village has retained its rural character, but also has become the home of several artisans and commercial establishments.

== See also ==
- Communes of the Doubs department
