= Bretigney =

- Commune
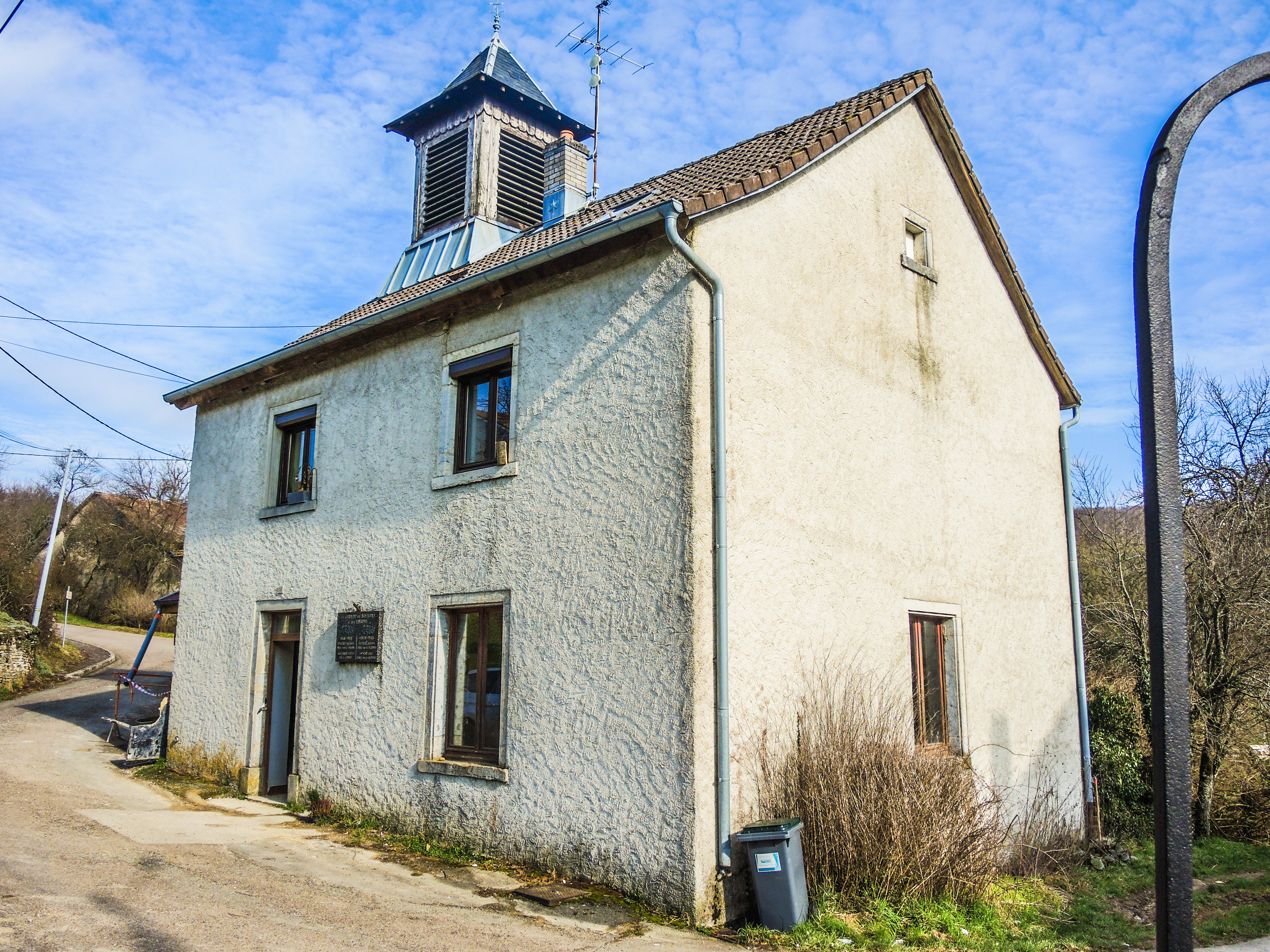
- The town hall in Bretigney

- Coat of arms
- Location of Bretigney
- Location within France Location within Bourgogne-Franche-Comté
- Coordinates: 47°29′11″N 6°38′15″E
- Country: France
- Region: Bourgogne-Franche-Comté
- Department: Doubs
- Arrondissement: Montbéliard
- Canton: Bavans
- Intercommunality: Pays de Montbéliard Agglomération

Government
  - Mayor (2020–2026): Christine Boschi
- Area^{1}: 1.83 km^{2} (0.71 sq mi)
- Highest elevation: 455 m (1,493 ft)
- Lowest elevation: 355 m (1,165 ft)
- Population (2023): 74
  - Density: 40/km^{2} (100/sq mi)
- Time zone: UTC+01:00 (CET)
  - Summer (DST): UTC+02:00 (CEST)
- INSEE/Postal code: 25093 /25250
- ^{1} French Land Register data, which excludes lakes, ponds, glaciers > 1 km^{2} (0.386 sq mi or 247 acres) and river estuaries.

Bretigney (French pronunciation: [bʁətiɲɛ]) is a commune in the Doubs department in the Bourgogne-Franche-Comté region in eastern France.

== Population ==
Historical population
Year	Pop.	±% p.a.
1968	45	—
1975	44	−0.32%
1982	40	−1.35%
1990	58	+4.75%
1999	68	+1.78%
2007	77	+1.57%
2012	79	+0.51%
2017	73	−1.57%
2023	74	+0.23%
Source: INSEE

== See also ==
- Communes of the Doubs department
