= Brognard =

- Commune
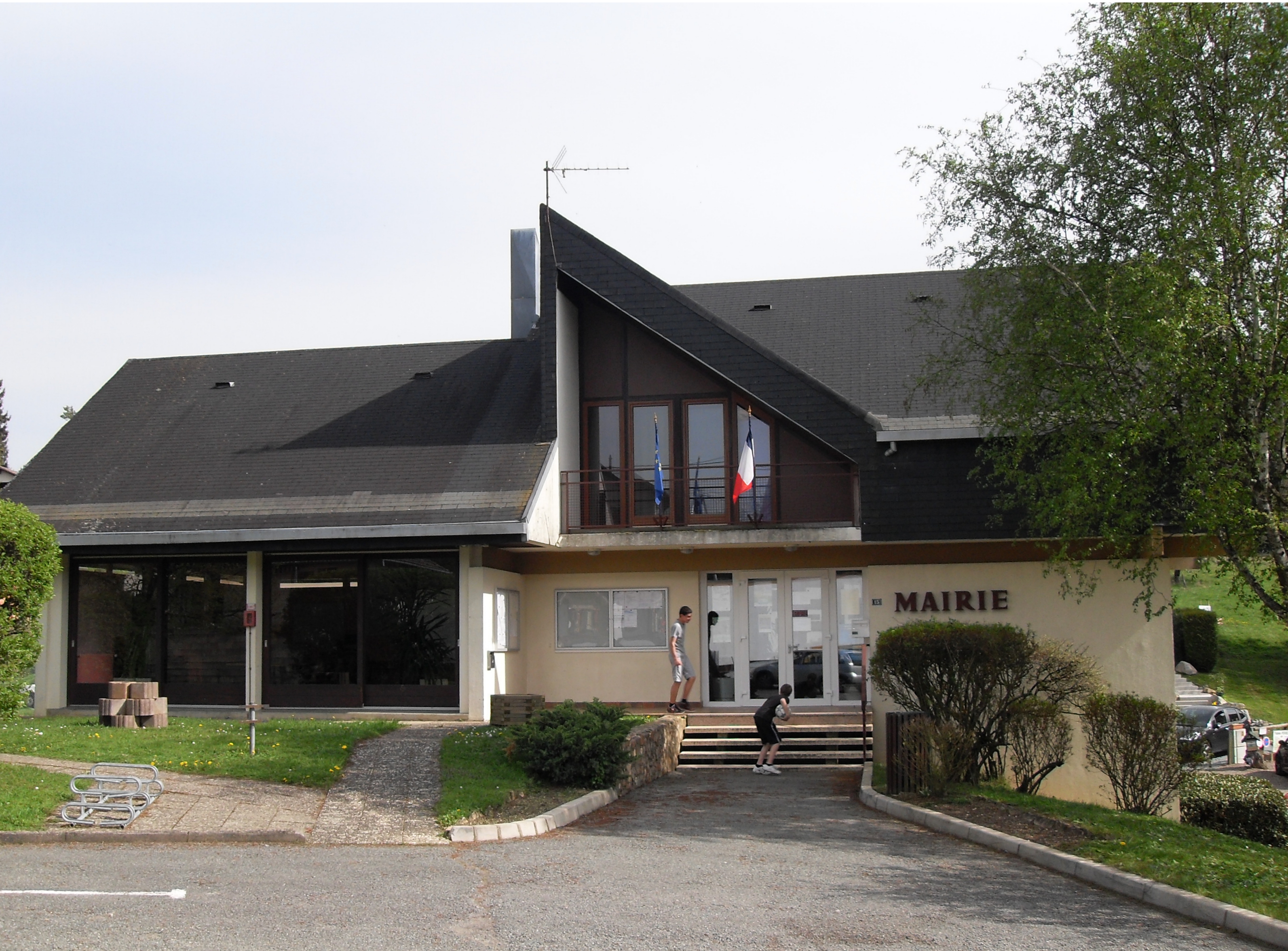
- Town hall

- Coat of arms
- Location of Brognard
- Location within France Location within Bourgogne-Franche-Comté
- Coordinates: 47°31′51″N 6°51′54″E
- Country: France
- Region: Bourgogne-Franche-Comté
- Department: Doubs
- Arrondissement: Montbéliard
- Canton: Bethoncourt
- Intercommunality: Pays de Montbéliard Agglomération

Government
  - Mayor (2020–2026): Gladys Bainier
- Area^{1}: 2.9 km^{2} (1.1 sq mi)
- Highest elevation: 383 m (1,257 ft)
- Lowest elevation: 319 m (1,047 ft)
- Population (2023): 471
  - Density: 160/km^{2} (420/sq mi)
- Time zone: UTC+01:00 (CET)
  - Summer (DST): UTC+02:00 (CEST)
- INSEE/Postal code: 25097 /25600
- ^{1} French Land Register data, which excludes lakes, ponds, glaciers > 1 km^{2} (0.386 sq mi or 247 acres) and river estuaries.

Brognard (French pronunciation: [bʁɔɲaʁ]) is a commune in the Doubs department in the Bourgogne-Franche-Comté region in eastern France.

== Population ==
Historical population
Year	Pop.	±% p.a.
1968	254	—
1975	228	−1.53%
1982	275	+2.71%
1990	424	+5.56%
1999	417	−0.18%
2007	436	+0.56%
2012	456	+0.90%
2017	481	+1.07%
2023	471	−0.35%
Source: INSEE

== See also ==
- Communes of the Doubs department
