= Blamont =

- Commune
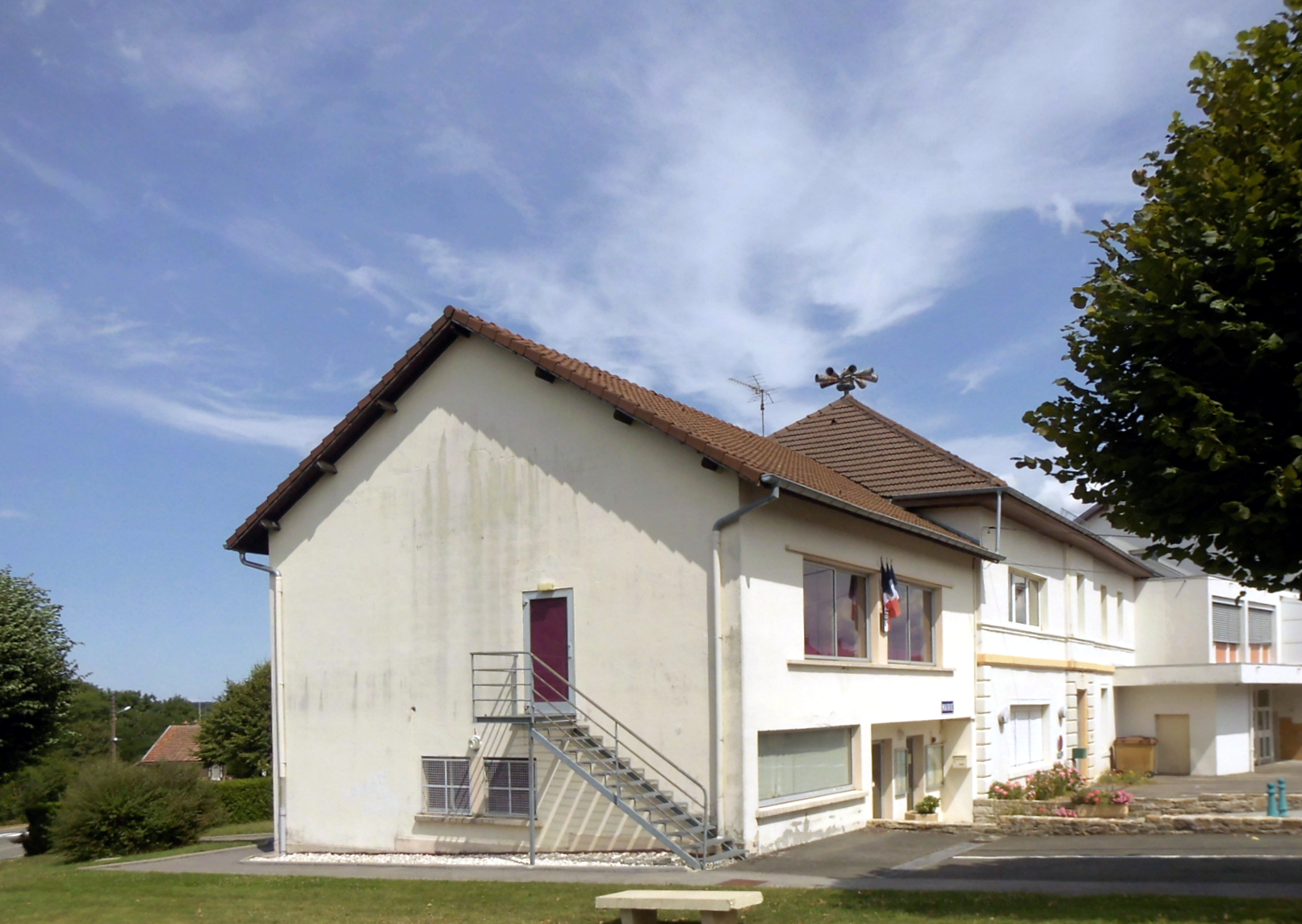
- The town hall in Blamont

- Coat of arms
- Location of Blamont
- Location within France Location within Bourgogne-Franche-Comté
- Coordinates: 47°23′11″N 6°50′56″E
- Country: France
- Region: Bourgogne-Franche-Comté
- Department: Doubs
- Arrondissement: Montbéliard
- Canton: Maîche
- Intercommunality: Pays de Montbéliard Agglomération

Government
  - Mayor (2020–2026): Serge Delfils
- Area^{1}: 10.06 km^{2} (3.88 sq mi)
- Highest elevation: 603 m (1,978 ft)
- Lowest elevation: 403 m (1,322 ft)
- Population (2023): 1,225
  - Density: 121.8/km^{2} (315.4/sq mi)
- Time zone: UTC+01:00 (CET)
  - Summer (DST): UTC+02:00 (CEST)
- INSEE/Postal code: 25063 /25310
- ^{1} French Land Register data, which excludes lakes, ponds, glaciers > 1 km^{2} (0.386 sq mi or 247 acres) and river estuaries.

Blamont (French pronunciation: [blamɔ̃]) is a commune in the Doubs department in the Bourgogne-Franche-Comté region in eastern France.

== Population ==
Historical population
| Year | Pop. | ±% p.a. |
|---|---|---|
| 1968 | 728 | — |
| 1975 | 1,045 | +5.30% |
| 1982 | 1,021 | −0.33% |
| 1990 | 1,026 | +0.06% |
| 1999 | 1,042 | +0.17% |
| 2007 | 1,120 | +0.91% |
| 2012 | 1,140 | +0.35% |
| 2017 | 1,221 | +1.38% |
| 2023 | 1,225 | +0.05% |
Source: INSEE

== See also ==
- Communes of the Doubs department

== Famous inhabitants ==
- The writer Charles François Philibert Masson
