= Reginald of Bar =

Reginald of Bar may refer to

- Reginald I, Count of Bar (1080-1149), count of Bar
- Reginald II, Count of Bar (1122-1170), count of Bar
- Reginald of Bar (bishop of Chartres) (d. 1217), bishop of Chartres
- Reginald of Bar (bishop of Metz) (d. 1316), bishop of Metz
