= Abbey of Lure =

Monastic institution in Lure, France

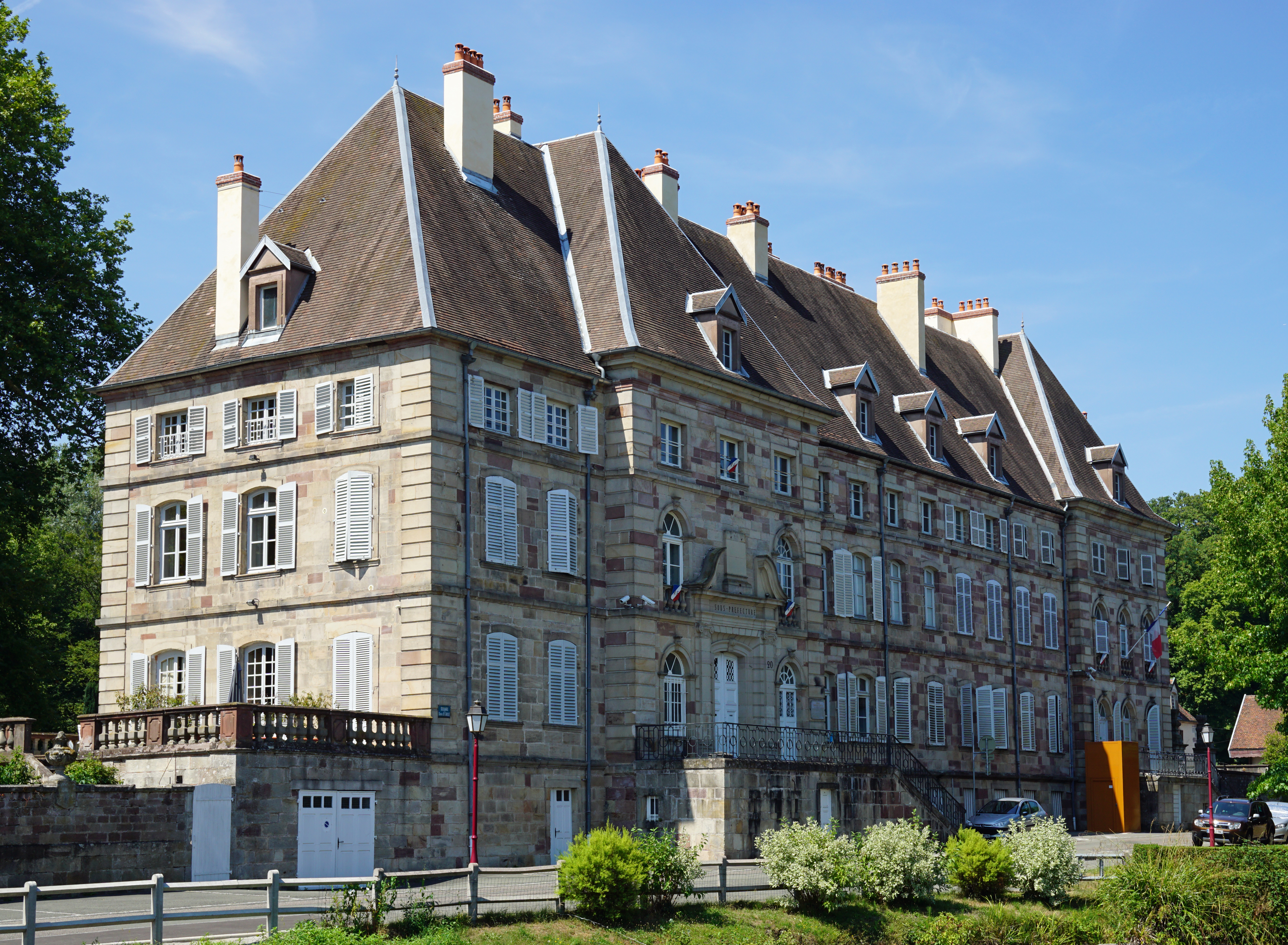

- Location within France
- Interactive map of Abbey of Lure

Monastery information
- Established: 611

People
- Founder: Deicolus

Architecture
- Heritage designation: Monument historique (1968, 1977, 1998)

Site
- Country: France
- Coordinates: 47°41′13″N 6°29′28″E

The Abbey of Lure, founded in the early 7th century by Saint Desle and reformed in the 10th century by Saint Baudran (or Baltran), was a monastic institution located in Lure. It maintained a degree of autonomy until 1678, with its abbot bearing the title of Prince of the Holy Roman Empire. In the 12th century, the abbey established closer ties with the Abbey of Murbach, culminating in a union in 1556. Following its incorporation into the County of Burgundy in 1678, the abbey’s political independence ended. Nowadays, only the current subprefecture building and a few adjacent canonical houses remain from the original monastic complex.

== Site ==
From its inception, the construction of the abbey was established near the Font pond, a resurgence of the Ognon River. At the time, the surrounding area consisted of marshland.

== History ==
=== Foundation by Saint Desle in the Merovingian period (7th–8th centuries) ===
In 611, Saint Desle (also known as Deicole or Diel), a disciple of Saint Columbanus, founded a monastery in Lure, historically referred to as Lura or Luthra (from lutum, meaning marsh). The site may have already been inhabited, as it was located along the route between Mandeure and Luxeuil, where numerous Roman antiquities have been discovered through archaeological excavations. Desle had arrived in the region around 570 from Ireland, accompanying Columbanus along with several companions, including Columbanus the Younger, who later succeeded him as head of the abbey.

Following the departure of Saint Columbanus from Luxeuil in 610, by order of Brunhilda, Queen of the Franks, King Chlothar II of Burgundy granted land to Saint Desle to establish his monastic foundation. According to legend, during a hunt in the forests of the Vosges near Lure—where Chlothar II held the royal estate of Saint-Quentin—the king encountered Desle while pursuing a boar that had taken refuge in the monk’s cell. Impressed by Desle's austerity and upon learning of his connection to Columbanus, the king is said to have granted him forests, fisheries, meadows, pastures, the villa Bredanas with its church, and vineyards located at Saint-Antoine, with the intention that they remain permanently attached to the monastery.

The land on which the Abbey of Lure was established belonged to Weishar (or Werfaire), a noble associated with the court of the King of Burgundy, who resided in Villa-Colonis, now known as Châlonvillars. His wife, Berthilde, donated property to support the monastery and enable Saint Desle to construct two oratories dedicated to Saint Peter and Saint Paul. From its foundation, the abbey attracted contributions from regional nobility. It received endowments from Duke Attic, who held its advocatus, later transferring it to the House of Dabo and Eguisheim through his grandson, Eberhard of Eguisheim, in 727. The rights were subsequently passed to the Counts of Ferrette.

According to tradition, near the end of his life, Saint Desle withdrew to a hermitage where he had built a small chapel dedicated to the Holy Trinity. He died there on January 18, 625, in the presence of his successor.

=== Reform during the Carolingian era and revival with Saint Baudran (8th–10th centuries) ===
The Abbey of Lure received significant support from Pepin the Short, Charlemagne, and Louis the Pious, who granted it substantial revenues and sovereign rights over approximately ten villages. Its domain included the territory of Passavant-la-Rochère and its castle, located on an elevated site between Plancher-Bas and Champagney. The abbey's lordship also encompassed the lands of Éboulet, Frahier, Errevet, Châlonvillars, and Mandrevillars.

In 817, the Council of Aachen mandated the adoption of the Rule of Saint Benedict in place of the Rule of Saint Columbanus, which had previously been observed at Lure and was noted for its stricter discipline. The council also introduced a classification system for monasteries: those required to provide men and financial support, those obligated to provide only subsidies, and those, such as Lure, that were required to offer prayers.

In the second half of the 9th century, during the reign of Lothair II of Lotharingia, the monastery of Lure was granted to his mistress Waldrada, who expelled the resident monks. Following Lothair II's death in 869, Waldrada retired to Remiremont and took religious vows, reportedly to avoid conflict with Pope Adrian II and Queen Teutberga. She transferred the lay protectorship of the abbey to her relative Eberhard III. The position was subsequently held by his son Hugues, and grandson Gontran. Contemporary sources describe Hugues as particularly hostile toward the monks. According to monastic accounts, Hugues experienced a severe illness and, fearing for his life, vowed to restore the rights and privileges of the abbey if he recovered. Following his recovery, he and his relatives reportedly performed acts of penance at the monastery. Hugues either entered monastic life or made a formal retreat there, ultimately reinstating the monastic community. He died at the abbey in 940.

Following the Hungarian invasions, during which the Abbey of Lure was pillaged and burned between 926 and 937, the monastery regained its prominence in the mid-10th century under Abbot Baudran (also known as Beltramme). Originally from Laversberg (or Alavesberg), located between Metz and Strasbourg, Baudran initiated the reconstruction and development of the abbey in 967 with the authorization of Otto I, Holy Roman Emperor. Otto, who was familiar with Baudran and frequently visited his monastery in Laversberg, encouraged the abbot to relocate due to ongoing jurisdictional disputes between the bishops of Strasbourg and Metz. Otto had acquired rights over Lure in 959 from Counts Eberhard IV of Alsace and Hugues I, and he granted the site to Baudran and his monastic community. In a charter, Otto described the location as “Locum Lutheraa vocatum, quem accepimus à filiis Hugonis, Heberhado et Hugone, monachis aptissimum, eis concessimus, Baltranno videlicet et ejus subditis.” To support the restoration of the abbey, Otto added to the donation several churches (including those in Roye, Dambenois, and Tavey) as well as possessions in Volvesheim and Rotesheim. The grant was made under the condition that Abbot Baudran rebuild the church and monastery. Although granted by the emperor, the abbey remained under the sovereignty of the Kings of Burgundy, referred to in the imperial charter as the Reges Francorum, a term then used by German sources to designate the kings of Burgundy and Neustria. At the time, this referred to Conrad III of Burgundy, Otto’s brother-in-law.

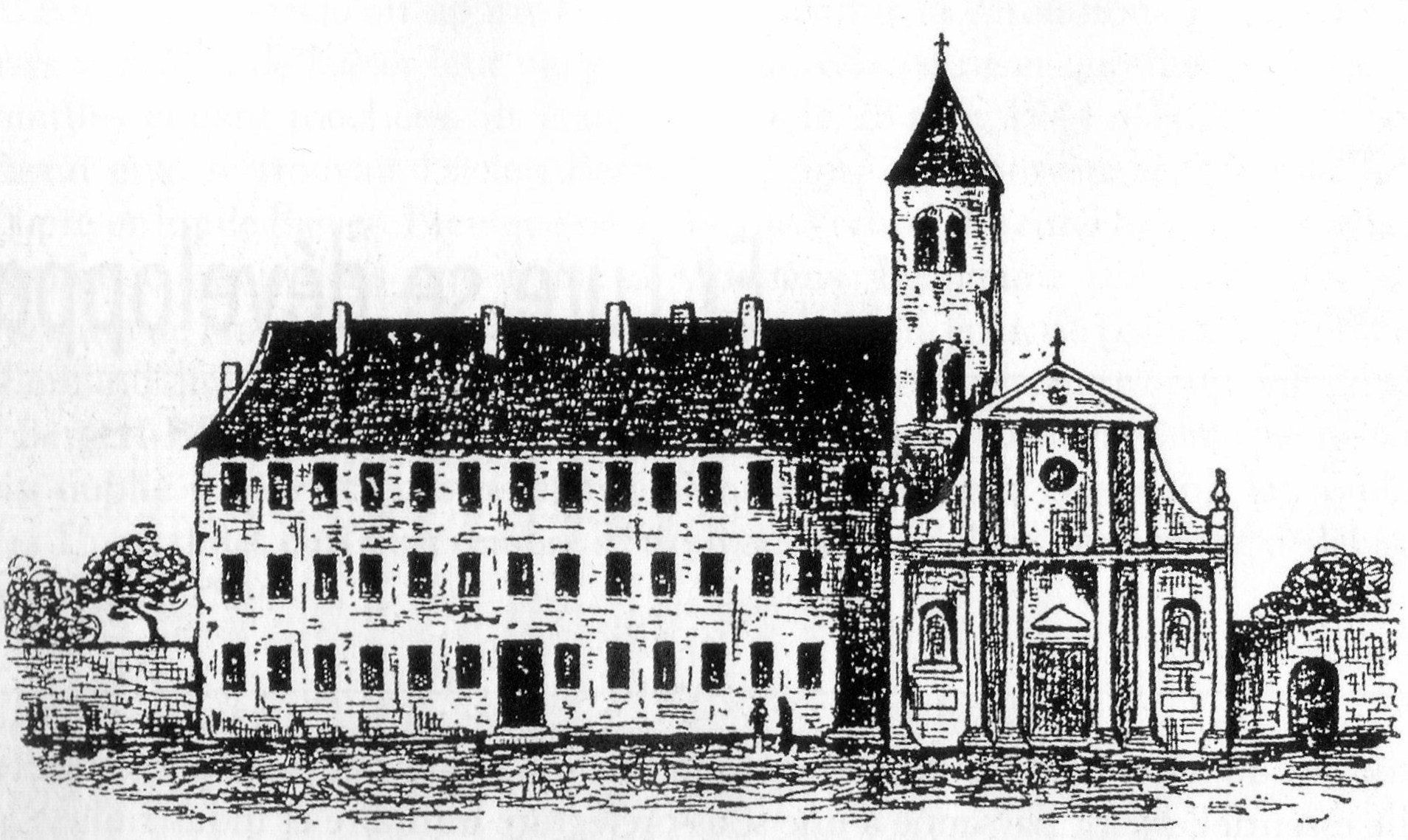
Old drawing before the destruction of the church.

In 959, Otto I, Holy Roman Emperor, granted the Abbey of Lure a charter designating it as an imperial fief. The abbey was granted several privileges, including the right to elect its abbot and exemption from episcopal authority, placing it in direct dependence on the Holy See. These privileges were reaffirmed (eo quod proesatum Monastriem, ab Eberardo injusté sibi usurpatum, justé et legaliter consecuti sumus) in 1016 by Henry II, who confirmed them to Abbot Milon during a meeting at Kembs. Henry II further expanded the abbey's rights to include legislative authority, the appointment of officials, the making of peace and war, the right to mint coins, the granting of privileges, and the use of the formula “by the grace of God.”

=== The Abbots and the Holy Roman Empire (11th–17th centuries) ===
In 1032, Rudolph III of Burgundy, the last King of Burgundy, transferred his possessions to Conrad II, Holy Roman Emperor and husband of his niece, as well as to Conrad’s son, Henry III. To consolidate imperial sovereignty over the Kingdom of Burgundy, Conrad and Henry granted the rights of high and middle regalia to several prelates. These regalian rights included minting currency, levying taxes, raising military forces, issuing commands, providing safe-conduct, granting pardons, legitimizing offspring, and holding rights over treasures, mines, and gemstones. As a result, the abbots of Lure acquired the status of Princes of the Empire and were entitled to a deliberative vote in the Imperial Diet of the Holy Roman Empire.

On 14 November 1157, Frederick I Barbarossa confirmed the Abbey of Lure’s imperial privileges in a charter issued at Montbarrey, during his visit to the Besançon region for the convening of a diet. These privileges were subsequently reaffirmed by his son Henry VI and later by Frederick II. In 1218, Frederick II placed the abbey under his personal protection and granted Abbot Thiébaud the titles of Imperial Chaplain and Prince of the Empire.

During the 13th century, the Abbey of Lure held ownership of the Saulnot saltworks, a significant source of revenue, granted by Thierry III. However, following Thierry’s death around 1282, the abbey lost possession of the saltworks.

The fief and avouerie of the Abbey of Lure were entrusted by the Counts of Burgundy to various external lords, including the House of Ferrette. This county became part of the holdings of the House of Austria following the marriage of Jeanne, daughter of Ulrich III of Ferrette, to Albert II of Austria around 1324. Albert II subsequently refused to perform homage for the abbey to Eudes IV, Duke of Burgundy and sovereign of Franche-Comté, leading to a conflict. The status of the Abbot of Lure as a Prince of the Holy Roman Empire facilitated the Austrian duke’s ability to avoid feudal obligations to Eudes IV.

On March 7, 1544, Charles V authorized Jean Rodolphe Stoer (or de Stoeremberg), coadjutor appointed by Georges de Masmünster, Abbot of Lure and Murbach, to establish a mint for the two monasteries. The mint was set up in Guebwiller and produced silver coins equivalent in value and weight to other currencies of the Holy Roman Empire, in denominations of one écu, half écu, and quarter écu. One side of the coins featured a spread eagle with the Latin inscription Carolus V, Romanorum imperator, while the other side displayed the abbot’s coat of arms quartered with that of the abbey, along with his name and the year of minting. This currency remained in circulation until the annexation of the region by France.

=== Union of Murbach and Lure ===
In the 12th century, Count Thierry II of Montbéliard acquired the avouerie of the Abbey of Lure and became known for his severity and demands. In response, the Abbot of Lure appealed for his excommunication and sought the protection of ecclesiastical authorities. This initiated a rapprochement between the Abbey of Lure and the Abbey of Murbach, located in Upper Alsace and under the jurisdiction of the Diocese of Basel. The union between the two monasteries was formally established on 12 March 1556 by decree of Cardinal Giovanni Morone, papal legate to Germany, and was confirmed by a bull from Pope Pius IV in 1560. Following this union, the abbots held the titles and coats of arms of both abbeys and possessed two votes in the Imperial Diets.

=== Annexation to Franche-Comté and France (17th–18th centuries) ===
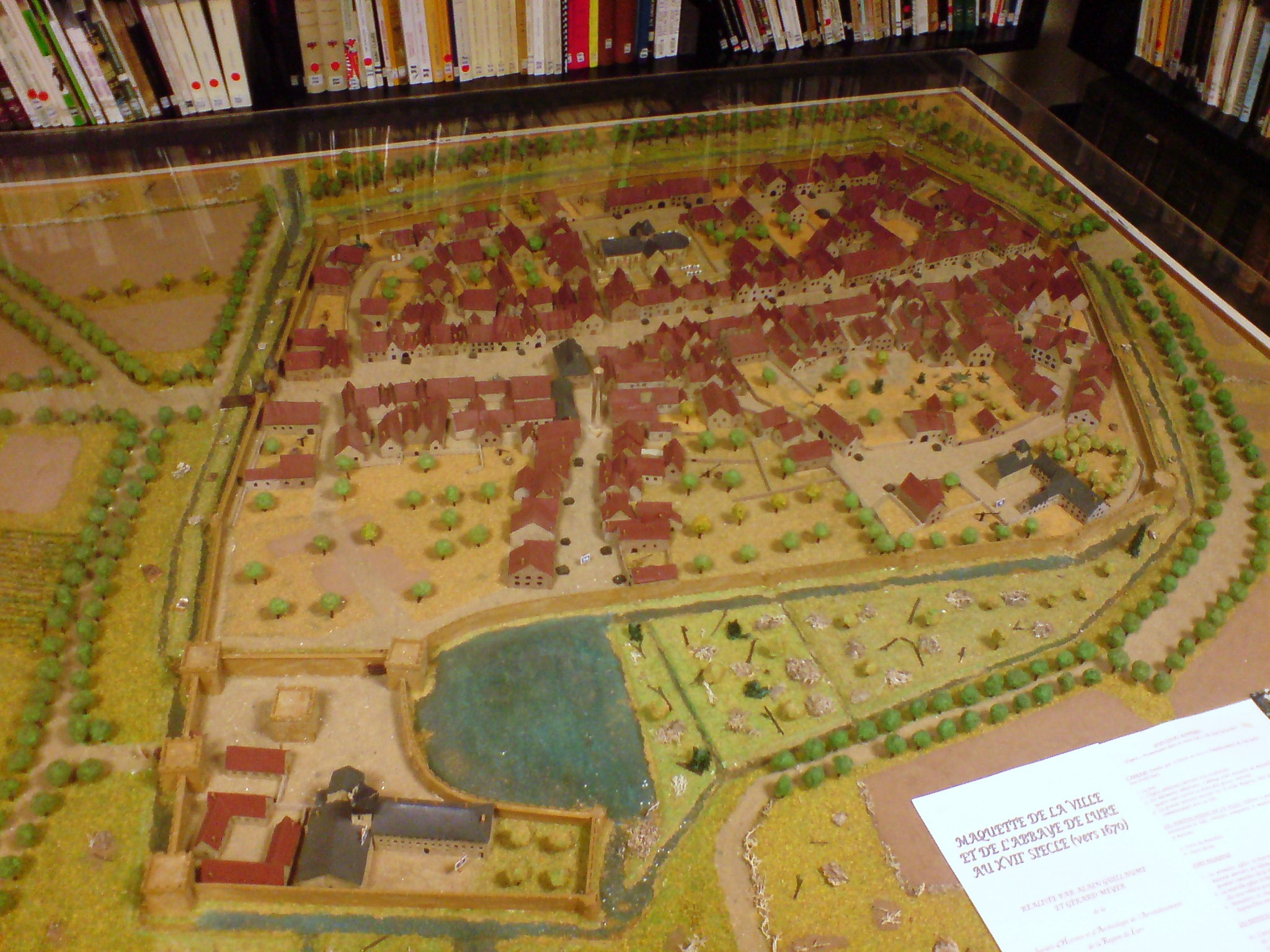
This model (facing east) shows Lure as it was in 1670, surrounded by a wall and double moat. The abbey was specially protected, constituting a fortification in itself. These fortifications were demolished on the orders of Louis XIV. Today, nothing remains of them.

During the Thirty Years’ War, the Abbey of Murbach placed the Abbey of Lure under French protection in 1634, entrusting it to Marshal of France Jacques Nompar de Caumont, duc de La Force. On 3 July 1674, during the final phase of the French conquest of Franche-Comté, the abbey was bombarded for six hours.

On 11 August 1679, the abbey was annexed to the County of Burgundy by the Marquis de Montauban on behalf of Louis XIV. This annexation affected only the sovereign authority of the abbots over the abbey, which was transferred to the French Crown; their other ecclesiastical and administrative rights were maintained.

In 1749, a ruling of the Council confirmed that the Abbey of Lure was under the suzerainty of the County of Burgundy. A papal bull issued by Pope Clement XIII on 3 August 1764 secularized both the Abbey of Lure and the Abbey of Murbach. They were transformed into noble chapters: Lure with six members and Murbach with eight, each led by a Prince-Abbot. Membership required proof of nobility for four generations. A royal brevet dated 18 July 1759, followed by the letters patent of April 1765, affirmed the abbot's status as a secular prince of the first rank of the united chapters, as well as Prince of the Holy Roman Empire, Grand Dean and Cantor of Murbach, Grand Provost and Treasurer of Lure, canon, and bearer of the pectoral cross and episcopal violet.

On 21 April 1757, the Prince-Abbot of Lure received a concession to operate coal mines in the Champagney area. During the French Revolution, the mines were confiscated and classified as national property. They were subsequently managed by state authorities and later by various private enterprises.

List of Abbots of Lure
Admission to the chapter required monks to provide proof of nobility by name and arms over sixteen ancestral quarters, on both paternal and maternal sides. The emblem of the united chapters was a gold-enamelled cross with eight points, featuring four fleurs-de-lis between the points. One side depicted Saint Desle and Saint Louis with the inscription S. Lud. patr. Murb. et Ludr.; the other side depicted Saint Léger and Saint Louis with the inscription Sti. Leod. et Deicole unio Sanctorum.

The coats of arms of the two monasteries were as follows: on the left, a silver field featuring a black rampant greyhound with a gold collar and red buckle, representing the Abbey of Murbach; on the right, a red field with a flesh-colored arm emerging from an ash-gray sleeve, raising two fingers in a gesture of blessing, representing the Abbey of Lure.

The armorial of Lure was: azure with a golden Saint Benedict.

List of Abbots:

- 610–620: Saint Desle
- 620: Saint Colombin
- 863: Hicco or Hicca, expelled
- 945–959: Baudran (or Baltran)
- 959: Werdolphe
- 978–980: Hicca II
- 1016: Milon
- 1040: Durand
- 1049: Gérard
- 1118: Humbert
- 1157: Ulric
- 1178: Guy
- 1215–1250: Thiébaud de Faucogney
- 1257–1283: Viard
- 1284–1300: Pierre I de Bauffremont
- 1300–1314: Alard de Gouhenans
- 1323: Foulques de Melincourt
- 1329: Pierre II de Montbozon
- 1330: Jacques de Vyt
- 1355: Guillaume I
- 1361: Othon
- 1367–1379: Henri
- 1379–1387: Guillaume II
- 1389–1410: Pierre III de Montbozon
- 1410–1422: Jean I de Beaumotte
- 1422–1438: Jean II de Beaumotte
- 1438–1452: Elyon de Lantenne
- 1453–1458: Claude de Rye
- 1458–1486: Jean III Stœr
- 1487: Pierre IV
- 1506–1510: Jean IV Virot
- 1511–1542: Jean-Georges de Massmùnster, confrère of Saint George
- 1542–1570: Jean-Rodolphe Stœr, confrère of Saint George
- 1571–1576: Jean-Ulrich de Raittnaw
- 1580: Wolfgang-Théoderic de Raittnaw, resigned
- 1580: Gabriel Gyet, resigned
- 1587–1600: André of Austria, cardinal
- 1601–1614: Jean-Georges de Kalkenriedt
- 1614–1626: Leopold, Archduke of Austria
- 1626–1662: Leopold-William, Archduke of Austria
- 1662: Colomban d’Andlau
- 1662–1682: François-Egon, Count of Fürstenberg
- 1682–1686: Félix-Egon, Count of Fürstenberg
- 1686–1720: Philippe-Eberhard, Count of Löwenstein-Wertheim
- 1720–1737: Célestin, Baron of Béroldingen-Gundelhart
- 1737–1756: François-Armand-Auguste, Prince of Rohan-Soubise
- 1756–1786: Léger-Casimir-Frédéric de Rathsamhausen
- 1787–1790: Benoît-Frédéric d’Andlau-Hombourg

== Buildings ==
The abbey church was demolished, and its stones were repurposed for other constructions.

The abbatial palace, dating from the 17th and 18th centuries, includes several components that were designated as historical monuments in 1968, 1977, and 1998. In the 1990s, a botanical garden was established behind the building. The site currently houses the subprefecture of Lure.

== Bibliography ==
- Unknown (1865). Bulletin [Newsletter] (in French). Berger-Levrault: Société pour la conservation des monuments historiques d'Alsace. pp. 78, 79.
- Clerc, Édouard (1840). Essai sur l'histoire de la Franche-Comté [Essay on the history of Franche-Comté] (in French). Vol. 1. pp. 142, 147, 169, 173, 227.
- Plantet, L; Jeannez, L; Monot, P (1855). Essai sur les monnaies du comté de Bourgogne depuis l'époque gauloise jusqu'à la réunion de la Franche-Comté à la France, sous Louis XIV [Essay on the coins of the County of Burgundy from the Gallic period until the reunion of Franche-Comté with France, under Louis XIV] (in French). pp. 261–264.
- Poncellin de la Roche-Tilhac, Jean-Charles (1785). État des cours de l'Europe et des provinces de France : pour l'année M.DCC.LXXXV [State of the courts of Europe and the provinces of France: for the year M.DCC.LXXXV.] (in French). pp. 17–18.
- Dunod de Charnage, François-Ignace (1750). Histoire de l'église, ville et diocèse de Besançon [History of the church, city and diocese of Besançon] (in French). Vol. 2. pp. 121, 130, 131, 132, 133, 134.
- Calmet, Augustin (1745). Histoire de Lorraine depuis l'entrée de Jules César dans les Gaules jusqu'à la cession de la Lorraine, arrivée en 1737 [History of Lorraine from Julius Caesar's entry into Gaul to the cession of Lorraine, 1737] (in French). p. 828.
- Viton de Saint-Allais, Nicolas (1811). Histoire généalogique des maisons souveraines de l'Europe : depuis leur origine jusqu'à présent [Genealogical history of the sovereign houses of Europe: from their origin to the present day] (in French). Vol. 1. pp. 58–66.
- Schoepflin, Johann Daniel (1851). L'Alsace illustrée: ou recherches sur l'Alsace pendant la domination des Celtes, des Romains, des Francs, des Allemands et des Français [Alsace Illustrated: or Research on Alsace during the Domination of the Celts, Romans, Franks, Germans and French] (in French). Ravenez. p. 237.
- Maury, Louis-Ferdinand-Alfred (1867). Les forêts de la Gaule et de l'ancienne France [The forests of Gaul and ancient France] (in French). p. 128.
- Thirria, Édouard (1869). Manuel à l'usage de l'habitant du département de la Haute-Saône [Manual for residents of the Haute-Saône département] (in French). pp. 769, 807.
- Unknown (1862). Mémoires de la commission d'archéologie [Memoirs of the archaeology commission] (in French). Vol. 3 & 4. Vesoul: Édition L. Suchaux. p. 274.
- Besson, Louis (1846). Mémoire historique sur l'abbaye de la ville de Lure [Historical report on the abbey in the town of Lure] (in French).
- Unknown (1839). Mémoires de la commission d'archéologie [Memoirs of the archaeology commission] (in French). Vol. 1 & 2. Vesoul: Édition L. Suchaux. p. 76.
- Poey d'Avant, Faustin (1862). Monnaies féodales de France [Feudal coins of France] (in French). Bureau de la revue numismatique Française. p. 156.
- Migne, Jacques-Paul (1856). Troisième et dernière encyclopédie théologique [Third and final theological encyclopedia] (in French). Vol. 16. p. 471.
- Parietti, Jean-Jacques (2001). Les Houillères de Ronchamp vol. I : La mine [Les Houillères de Ronchamp vol. I: The mine] (in French). Éditions Comtoises. ISBN 2-914425-08-2.
