= Amadeus II =

Amadeus II may refer to:

- Amadeus II, Count of Savoy (c. 1050–1080), Count of Savoy
- Amadeus II of Montfaucon (1130–1195), Count of Montbéliard
- Amadeus II of Geneva (died 1308), Count of Geneva
