= Murbach Abbey =

Abbey in Haut-Rhin, France

Coordinates: 47°55′24″N 7°09′29″E

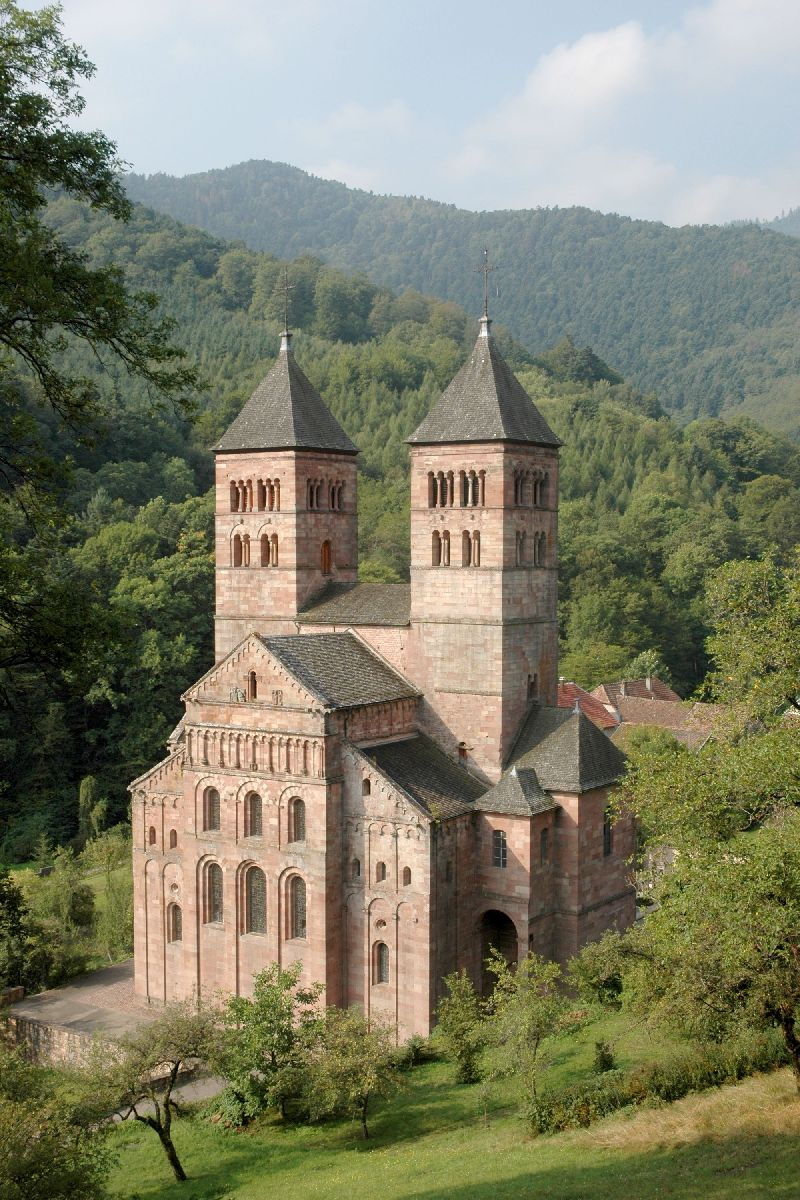
- Church of St. Leodegar, Murbach Abbey
- Interactive map of Murbach Abbey

Monastery information
- Order: Benedictine
- Established: 727

People
- Founders: Eberhard, Count of Alsace

Site
- Location: Murbach

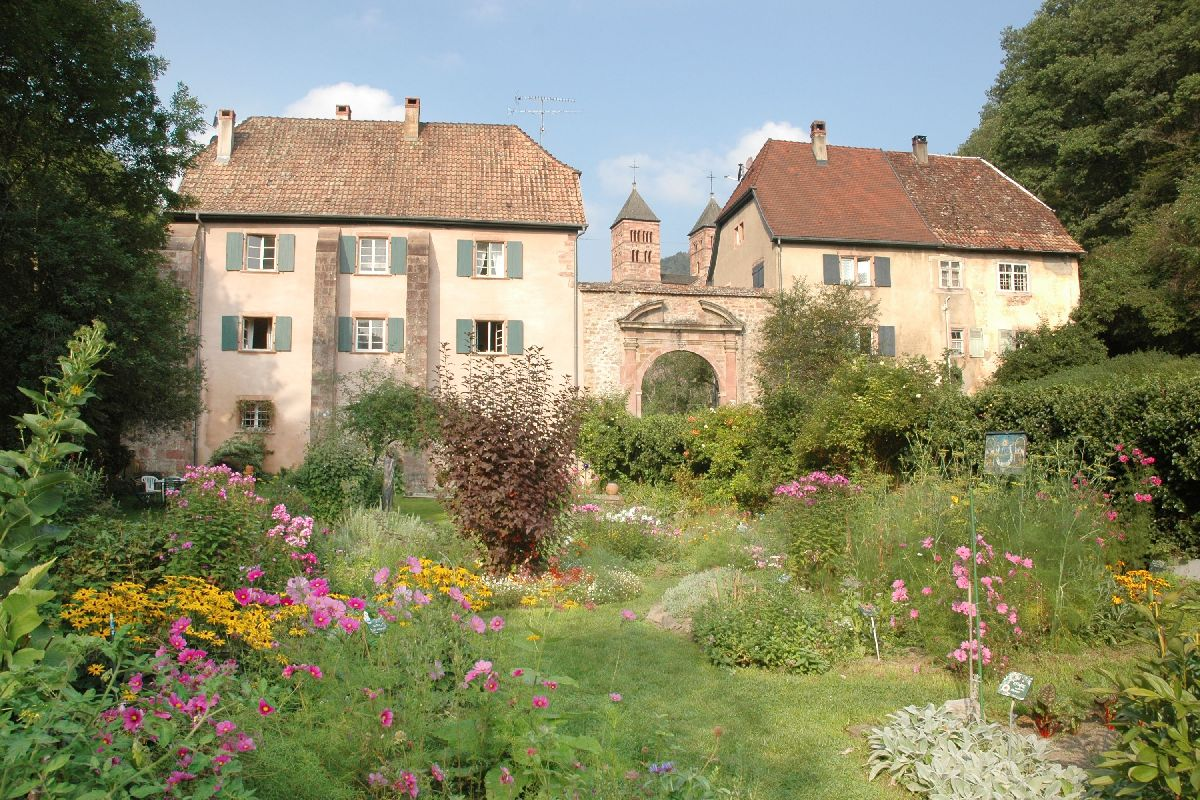
Murbach Abbey garden

Murbach Abbey (French: Abbaye de Murbach) was a famous Benedictine monastery in Murbach, southern Alsace, in a valley at the foot of the Grand Ballon in the Vosges.

The monastery was founded in 727 by Eberhard, Count of Alsace, and established as a Benedictine house by Saint Pirmin. Its territory once comprised three towns and thirty villages. The buildings, including the abbey church, one of the earliest vaulted Romanesque structures, were laid waste in 1789 during the Revolution by the peasantry and the abbey was dissolved shortly afterwards.

Of the 12th-century Romanesque abbey church, dedicated to Saint Leodegar (St. Léger), only the transept remains with its two steeples, and the east end with the quire. The site of the nave now serves as a burial ground. The building is located on the Route Romane d'Alsace.

== History ==
=== Early history ===
The founder of the abbey, Count Eberhard, brother of Luitfrid of the Etichonids, brought Bishop Pirmin from Reichenau Abbey on Lake Constance to build up the religious community, which had previously used the Rule of St. Columbanus, but which had lost its original value. Pirmin solved the difficulties by introducing the mixed rule of St. Columbanus and St. Benedict, until the general reform of Benedict of Aniane.

Count Eberhard gave the abbey a rich endowment and extensive privileges, including the right of free election of the abbot. The monastery was obliged to have its privileges regularly confirmed and was thus closely dependent on the Pope and the Emperor (after 1680 the King of France). Murbach was placed under the patronage of Saint Leodegar, who had introduced the Benedictine Rule into Burgundy in the 7th century.

The abbey was important politically, and Charlemagne himself took the title "Abbot of Murbach" (Latin: Pastor Murbacencis; in a secular sense) in 792–93.

By about 850 Murbach had become one of the intellectual centres of the Upper Rhine; the library contained about 340 works of theology, grammar and history. In its decline, the library at Murbach still provided a possible source (aside from Fulda Abbey) for Poggio Bracciolini's recovery in 1417 of Lucretius' lost didactic poem De rerum natura. The library was also the source of Velleius Paterculus book Historia Romana, that was found there in 1515 by Beatus Rhenanus. At the same time the worldly possessions of the abbey were increasing, thanks to large numbers of gifts. Murbach owned properties and rights in about 350 localities. Most of them were in Alsace, in the Bishoprics of Basle and Strasbourg. In addition there were properties on the right bank of the Rhine and even in the Black Forest. For example, in 805 the Alemannic nobles Egilmar, Focholt, Wanbrecht and Nothicho gave to the abbey their land and a church in the present Grissheim (Latin: villa Cressheim in pago Brisachgaginse). Lucerne abbey was a possession of Murbach by the mid 9th century. It possessed property in the vicinity of Worms around 900, and is mentioned in the Wormser wall-building ordinance as one of the places that shared responsibility for maintaining the city walls.

This first period of prosperity ended in 936 with the invasion of Alsace by Hungarians.

Murbach shows signs of decline during the 12th century, although in 1178, the city of Lucerne was founded as a Murbach possession. The abbey was dedicated in 1134.

=== Imperial Abbey ===
Murbach Abbey was granted the status of imperial immediacy in 1228, under abbot Hugues of Rothenburg. Murbach expanded its territorial possessions during the 13th century, mostly in the Alsace, leading to conflicts with the Bishop of Basel and the counts of Habsburg.

Murbach Abbey sold its rights over the city of Lucerne and estates in Unterwalden to Rudolph I of Germany on 16 April 1291. This was a significant event for the foundation of the Old Swiss Confederacy, as the Waldstätte or Forest Communities (Uri, Schwyz and Unterwalden) saw their trade route over Lake Lucerne cut off and feared losing their independence.

From the 14th century the abbey began gradually to decline in influence although in the 15th and 16th centuries it retained its status as a principality.

The Peace of Westphalia (Treaty of Münster) of 1648 granted parts of the Alsace to France, but reserved the abbeys of Murbach Lüders as remaining with the Holy Roman Empire. The kingdom of France nevertheless managed to acquire de facto control over both abbeys in 1680, under the so-called Chambers of Reunion established by Louis XIV, and the two abbeys were part of the territorial disputes between France and the Empire during the period of 1680 to 1789. In c. 1759, under Kasimir Friedrich von Rathsamhausen, the abbey was moved to Guebwiller, where the monks soon launched the construction of a new and monumental church, Notre-Dame de Guebwiller. The abbey abandoned the Benedictine Rule and was transformed into a college for members of the nobility (French: chapitre collégial-équestral de Murbach, German: Adeliges Ritterstift Murbach). In 1789 the abbey was dissolved after having been looted by rioting peasants.

== List of abbots ==
Source: Gallia Christiana.

- 727-731 : Saint Pirmin
- 731-752 : Romain
- 752-762 : Baldebert
- 762-774 : Haribert
- 774-789 : Amicus
- 789-792 : Saint Simpert
- 792-793 : Charlemagne (nominal "lay abbot")
- 793-795 : Egilmar
- 795-811 : Gerold
- 811-829 : Gontran
- 829-877 : Sigismar
- 877-913 : Frederick
- 913-976 : Wandbert
- 976-988 : Berenger
- 988-1023 : Helmeric
- 1023-1041 : Degenhard
- 1041-1049 : Eberhard
- 1049-1056 : Wolfrad
- 1056-1075 : Robert
- 1075-1080 : Udalric
- 1080-1122 : Samuel
- 1122-1144 : Berthold I
- 1144-1160 : Egilolf
- 1160-1189 : Conrad I von Eschenbach
- 1189-1190 : Widerolf
- 1190-1194 : Suitbert
- 1194-1218 : Arnold
- 1218-1239 : Hugues of Rothenburg (first prince-abbot)
- 1239-1240 : Albert I of Fronburg
- 1240-1261 : Thibaud of Faucogney
- 1261-1285 : Berthold II of Steinbrunn
- 1285/6-1298 : Berthold III of Falkenstein
- 1298-1304 : Albert II of Liebstein
- 1304-1335 : Conrad II Schenk of Stauffenberg
- 1335-1345 : Conrad III Wernher of Murnhard
- 1345-1354 : Henry of Schawenburg
- 1354-1377 : John I Schulteiss of Guebwiller
- 1377-1387 : William I Stör of Störenburg
- 1387-1394 : Rudolph of Watteville
- 1394-1428 : William II of Wasselnheim
- 1428-1433 : Peter of Ostein
- 1433-1447 : Thierry of Domont
- 1447-1476 : Bartholomy of Andlau-Hombourg
- 1476-1489 : Achaz of Griessen
- 1489-1513 : Gautier of Wilsperg
- 1513-1542 : Georges of Massmünster
- 1542-1570 : John II Rudolph Stör of Störenburg
- 1570-1587 : John III Ulrich of Raitenau
- 1587 : Wolf Dietrich von Raitenau
- 1587 : Gabriel Giel of Gielsberg (elected, unconfirmed)
- 1587-1600 : cardinal Andrew of Austria (first commendatory abbot, also Bishop of Konstanz and Brixen)
- 1600-1614 : John IV Georges of Kalkenriedt
- 1614-1626 : Leopold I of Austria-Tyrol (Leopold V, Archduke of Austria, also Bishop of Passau and Strasbourg)
- 1626-1663 : Leopold II William of Austria (Leopold Wilhelm of Austria, also Bishop of Passau and Strasbourg)
- 1663-1664 : Columban of Andlau-Hombourg
- 1664-1682 : Francis Egon of Fürstenberg (also Bishop of Strasbourg)
- 1682-1686 : Felix-Egon of Fürstenberg (administrator)
- 1686-1720 : Philipp Eberhard von Löwenstein-Wertheim-Rochefort (abbot of Gorze)
- 1720-1737 : Célestin-Sébastien of Beroldingen-Gundelhart
- 1736/7-1756 : François-Armand de Rohan (also Bishop of Strasbourg)
- 1756-1786 : Kasimir Friedrich von Rathsamhausen
- 1786-1790 : Benedikt Friedrich von Andlau-Homburg (Benoît-Frédéric van Andlau-Hombourg)

== See also ==
- List of Carolingian monasteries
- Abbey of Lure

== Gallery ==
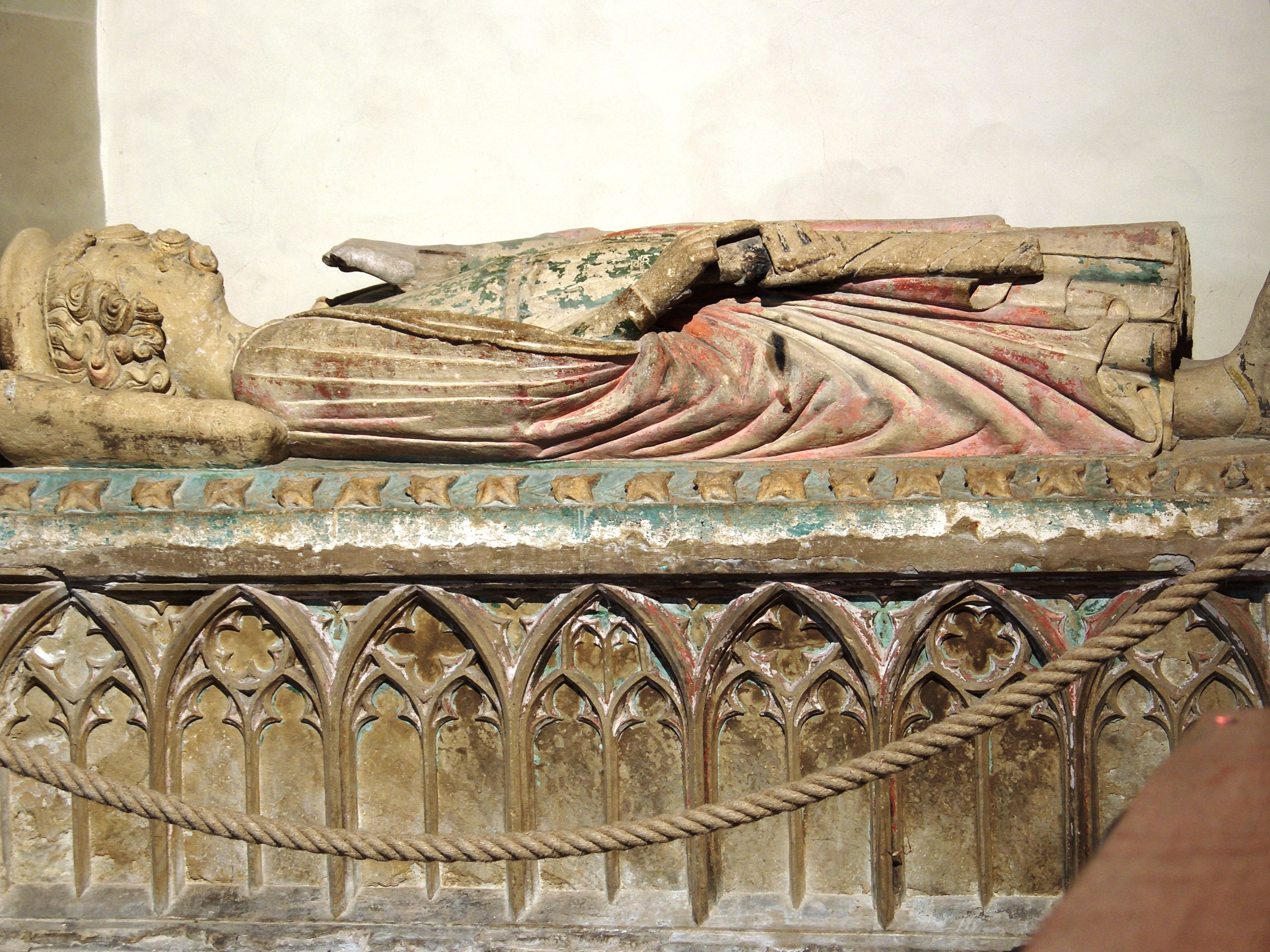
Late medieval tomb of Count Eberhard inside the church

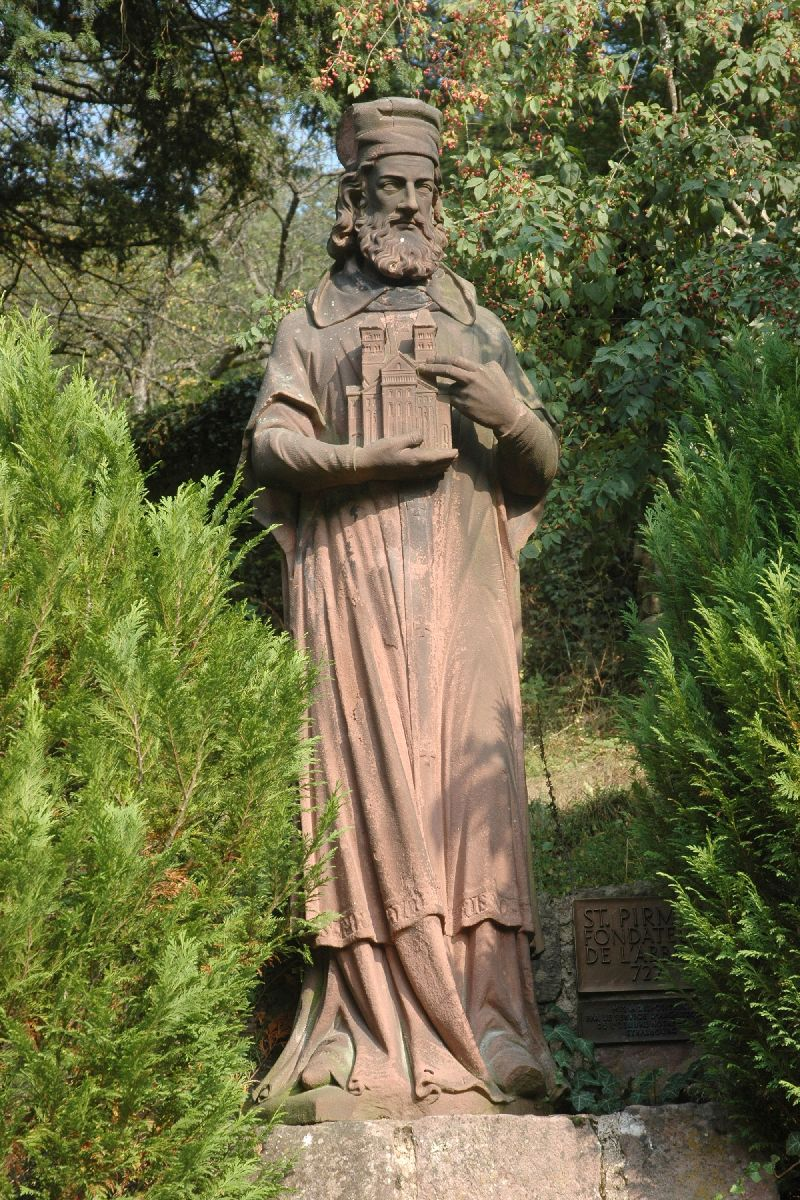
19th century figure of Saint Pirmin at Murbach Abbey
