= Theodoric I of Montbéliard =

French noble (c. 1045–1105)

Theodoric I (French: Thierry) (c. 1045 – 2 January 1105) was a count of Montbéliard, Bar, and Verdun and lord of Mousson. He was the son of Count Louis of Montbéliard and Countess Sophie of Bar.

After his father's death, he claimed the estate of the Duchy of Lorraine, which his father had already claimed. The claim was dismissed by Emperor Henry IV, confirming the duchy to Theodoric the Valiant. In retaliation, he ravaged the Diocese of Metz, but he was defeated by Adalbéron III, bishop of Metz, and the duke of Lorraine Theodoric the Valiant. Reconciled with the Church, he founded an abbey in 1074 in Haguenau and rebuilt the church at Montbéliard in 1080. He did not participate at the Council of Clermont in 1095, or the Crusades, but rather sent his son Louis in the Crusades. In 1100, the bishop of Verdun gave the county to Thierry for life, but the relationship between the spiritual and temporal powers was turbulent.

In 1065 Theodoric married Ermentrude (1055–1105), daughter of Count William I of Burgundy. They had:

- Theodoric II (1081–1163), Count of Montbéliard
- Louis, who became a crusader, returned in 1102 and was assassinated in 1103
- Frederick I († 1160), Count of Ferrette and Altkirch
- Reginald I (1090–1150), Count of Bar and lord of Mousson
- Stephen (†1162), bishop of Metz
- William, who died before 1105
- Hugh, cited in 1105, probably religious, because he did not share his father's possessions
- Gunthilde (†1131), abbess of Biblisheim
- Agnes, married in 1104 (†1136)

== Sources ==
- Bornert, René (2009). Les monastères d'Alsace. Vol. 2. Éditions du Signe. ISBN 9782746822191.
- Bouchard, Constance Brittain (1987). Sword, Miter, and Cloister: Nobility and the Church in Burgundy, 980-1198. Cornell University Press.
- Georges Poull, La Maison souveraine et ducale de Bar, 1994

Preceded by Louis	Count of Montbéliard; 1073–1105	Succeeded by Theodoric II of Montbéliard
Preceded by Sophie of Bar	Count of Bar; 1093–1105	Succeeded by Reginald I of Bar
Preceded by Sophie of Bar	Lord of Mousson; 1093–1105	Succeeded by Reginald I of Bar
Preceded by Unknown	Count of Verdun; 1100–1105	Succeeded by Reginald I of Bar
