= Sophie of Bar =

French countess

Sophie

Countess of Bar Lady of Mousson
- Reign: 1033 – 21 January/June 1093
- Predecessor: Frederick II
- Successor: Theodoric I
- Regent: Louis
- Spouse: Louis, Count of Montbéliard
- Issue Detail: Theodoric I, Count of Montbéliard; Frederick of Montbéliard
- Father: Frederick II, Duke of Upper Lorraine
- Mother: Matilda of Swabia

Sophie (Note: (French: [sɔfi]; Latin: Sophia, pronounced [ˈsopʰia])) (c. 1004 or 1018 – 21 January/June 1093) was Countess of Bar and Lady of Mousson in her own right from 1033 until her death. She was also Countess of Montbéliard as the wife of Louis, Count of Montbéliard.

== Life ==
Sophie was a daughter of Frederick II, Duke of Upper Lorraine and Matilda of Swabia. After her father died in 1026, she and her sister Beatrice went to live with their mother's sister, Empress Gisela. Her sister Beatrix married Boniface, margrave of Tuscany, and remarried after his death with Godfrey III, Duke of Lower Lotharingia.

Sophie was Countess of Bar between 1033 and 1092, in succession of her childless brother, Duke Frederick III of Upper Lotharingia (died 1033). She married Louis, Count of Montbéliard. Their son Theodoric (1045–1105) succeeded to the county of Montbéliard and to the county of Bar-le-Duc.

== Issue ==
Sophie and Louis had:

- Theodoric I, Count of Montbéliard
- Bruno
- Louis, cited in 1080
- Frederick of Montbéliard
- Sophie, married to Folmar, count of Froburg
- Beatrice (died 1092), married to Berthold I of Zähringen (died 1078), duke of Carinthia
- Mathilde, married to Hugh of Dagsburg (died 1089)

== Notes ==
Preceded by Frederick III, Duke of Upper Lorraine	Count of Bar; 1033–1093	Succeeded by Theodoric I, Count of Montbéliard
Preceded by Frederick III, Duke of Upper Lorraine	Lord of Mousson; 1033–1093	Succeeded by Theodoric I, Count of Montbéliard
