= Château de Vaudémont =

Ruined 11th-century castle in Grand Est, France

Coordinates: 48°25′03″N 6°03′25″E

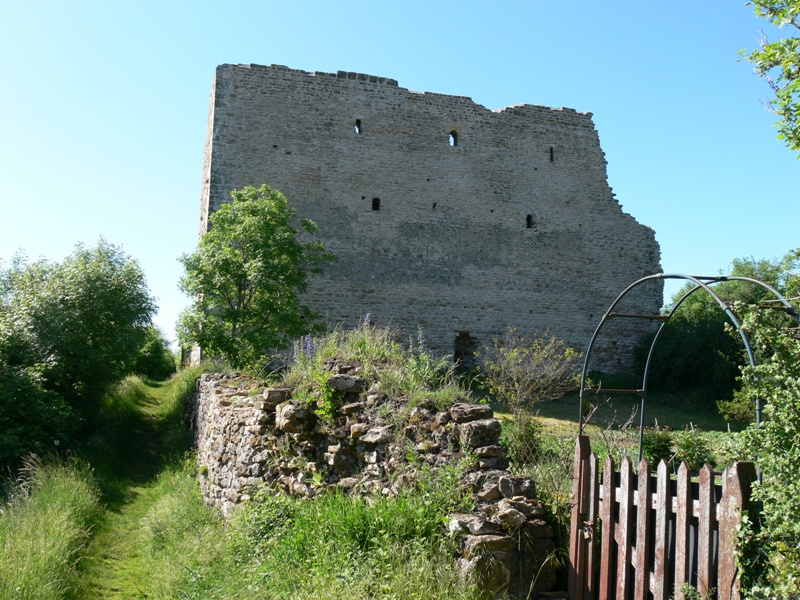
"Tour Brunehaut": east façade

The Château de Vaudémont is a ruined 11th-century castle in the commune of Vaudémont in the Meurthe-et-Moselle département of France. At its greatest extent, the castle measures about 500 by 250 metres (1,640 by 820 ft). The castle is one of a group of four castles built around the same time on highland sites along the Moselle valley between Nancy and Metz in northeast France. The other three castles are Dieulouard, Mousson and Prény; of the four, Vaudémont is the largest and best preserved. It was built as a hill castle in the 11th century for the Counts of Vaudémont, possibly for Gérard I (1071 – c.1120). The architect is unknown. The remains are part of the curtain wall and the keep, the so-called tour Brunehaut (Brunehaut tower) constructed with recycled Gallo-Roman remains. It was repaired during the 15th century, dismantled in 1639 on the orders of Louis XIII, and restored in 1930.

It has been classified since 1840 as a monument historique by the French Ministry of Culture.

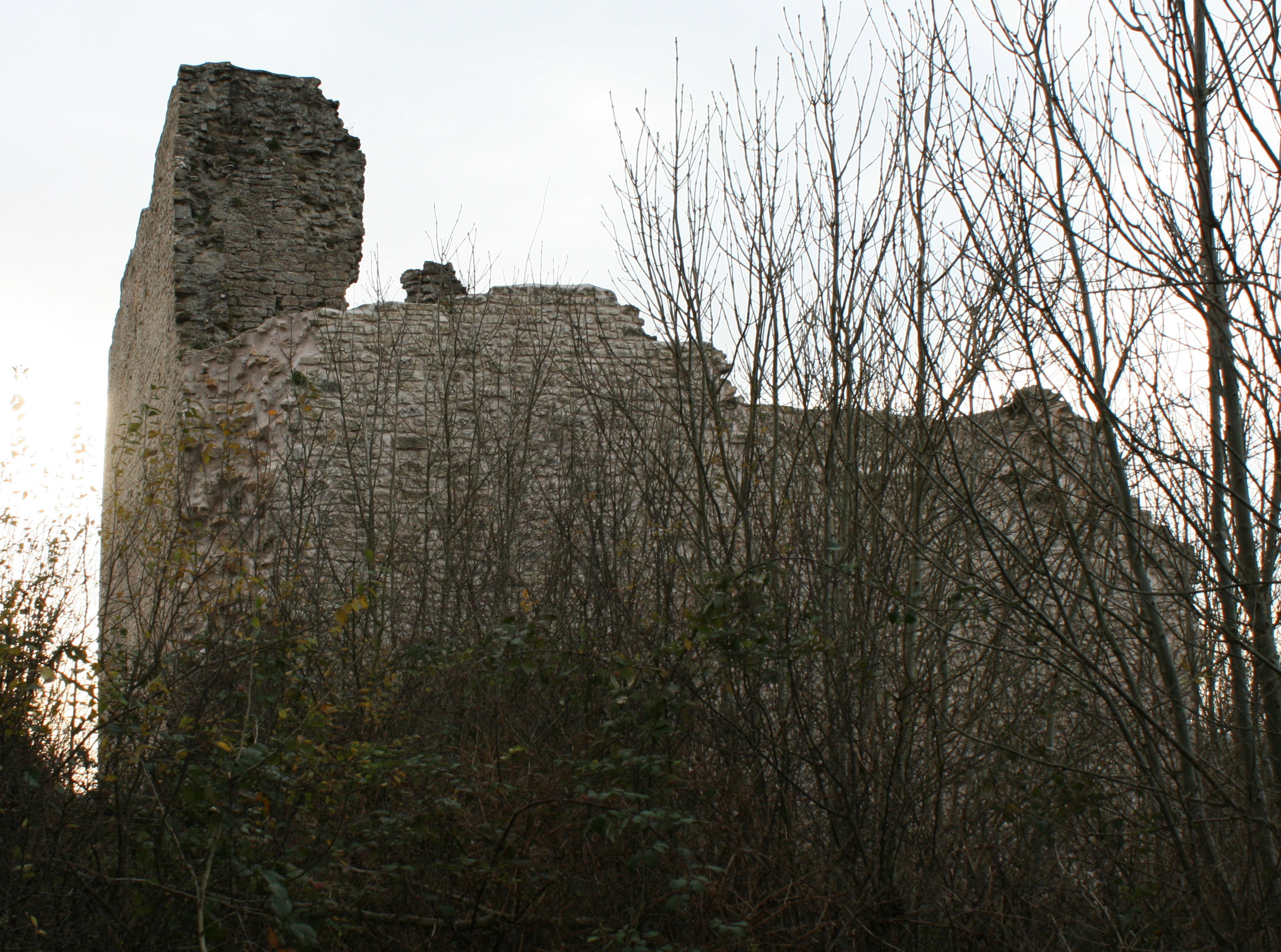
"Tour de Brunehaut" : north façade

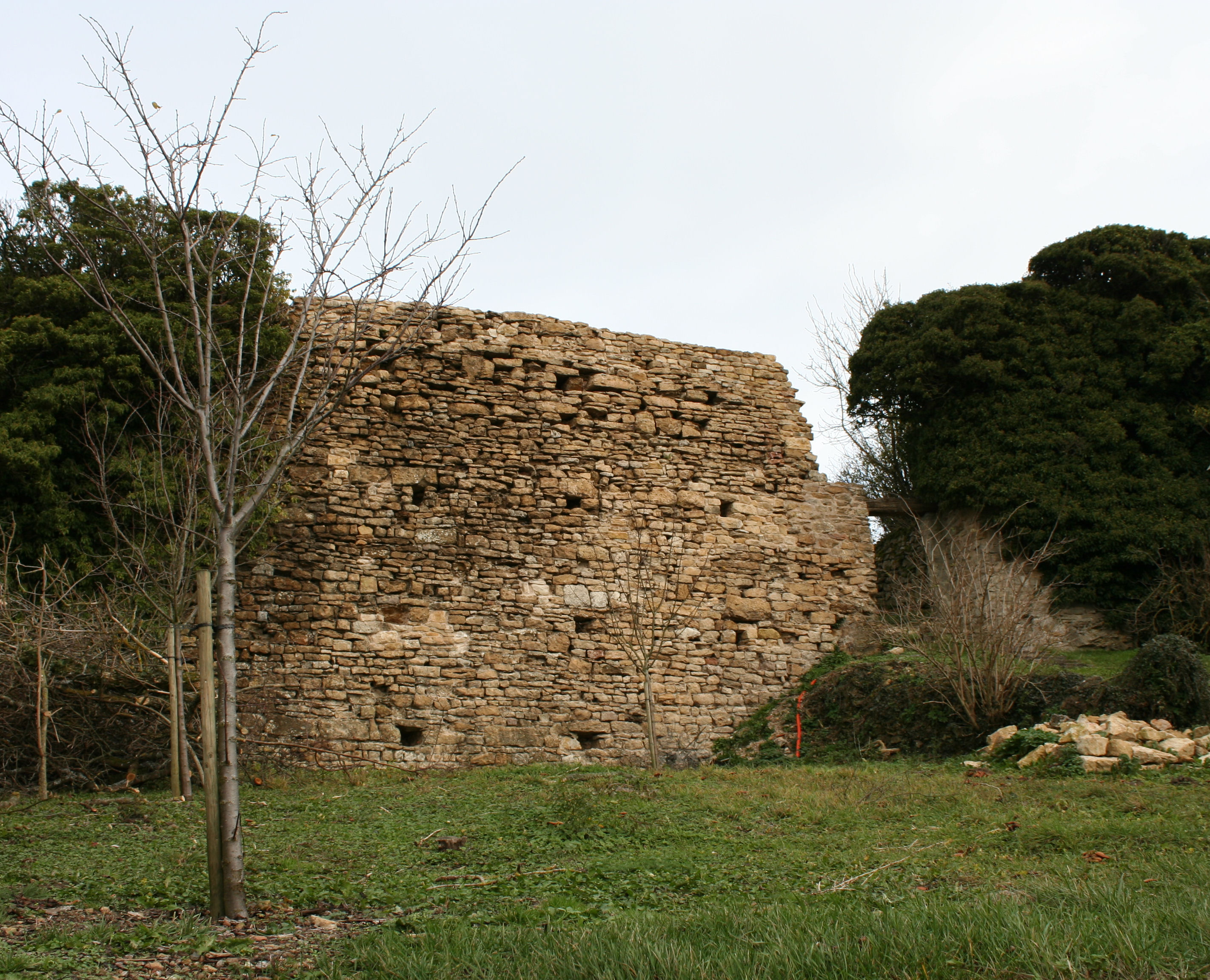
Curtain wall and postern

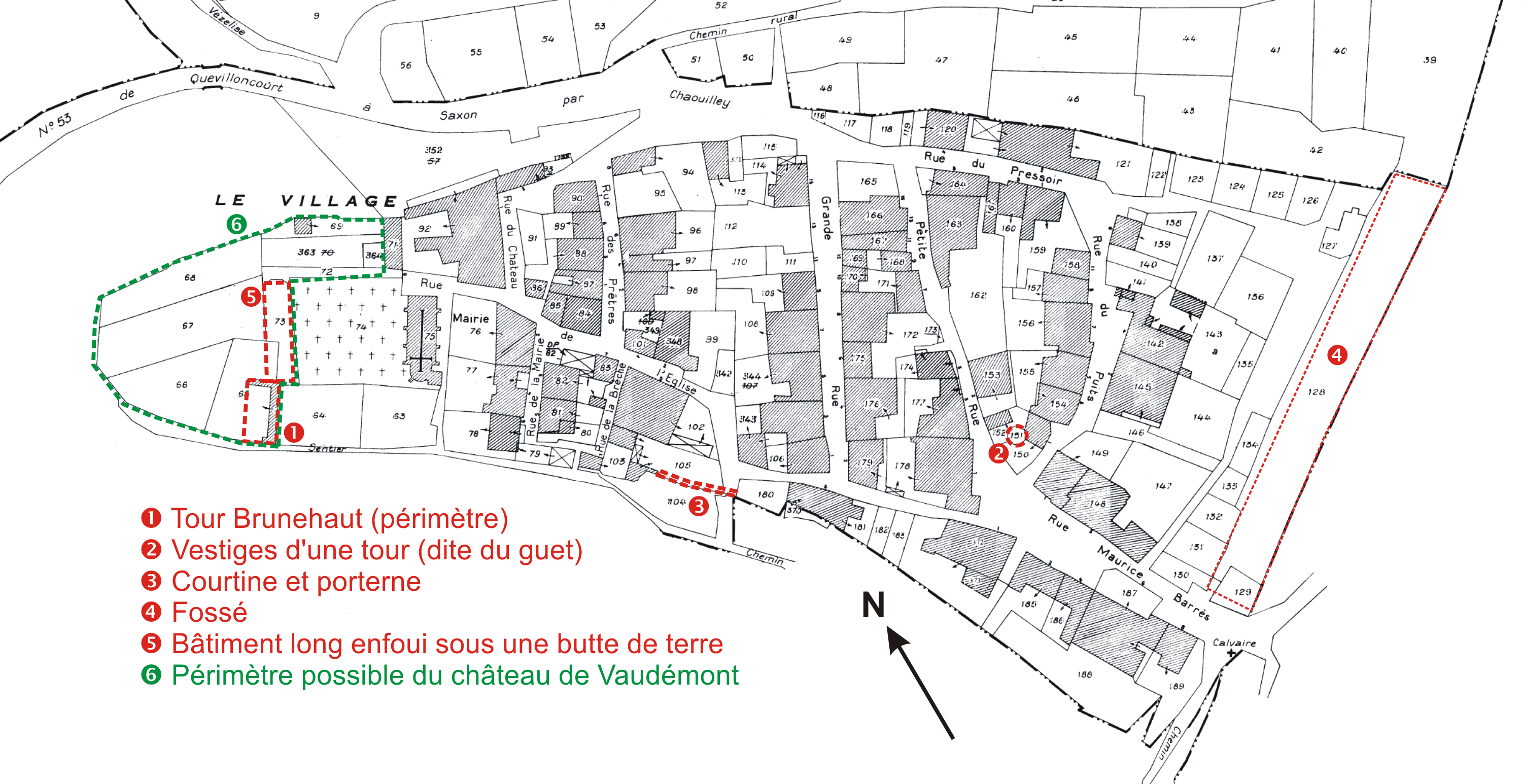
Location of ruins on cadastral map

== See also ==
- List of castles in France
