= Albero de Montreuil =

Archbishop of Trier from 1132 to 1152

Albero
- Archbishop of Trier
- Church: Catholic Church
- Diocese: Electorate of Trier
- In office: 1132–1152

Personal details
- Born: c. 1080
- Died: 18 January 1152

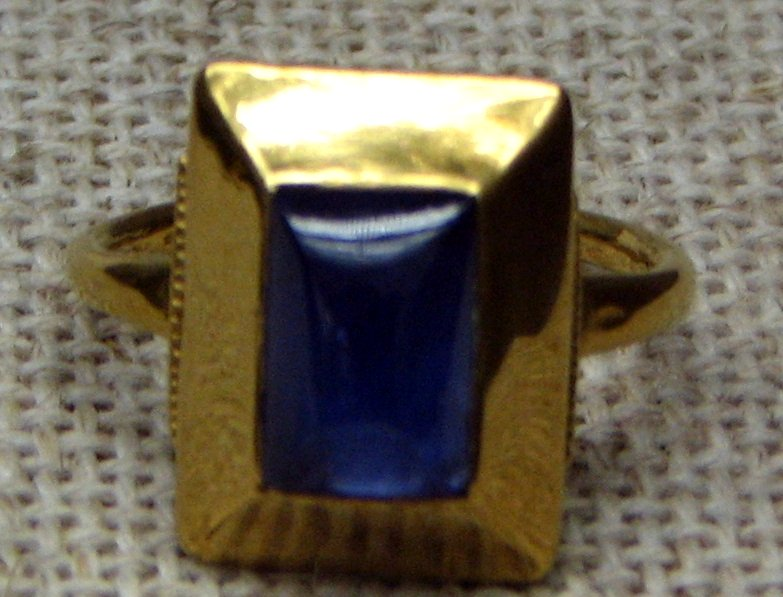
Episcopal ring of Albero de Montreuil

Albero de Montreuil (German: Albero, Adalbero von Munsterol) (c. 1080 – 18 January 1152) was Archbishop of Trier from 1132 to 1152 and is the subject of the Gesta Alberonis.

Albero was born near Toul in Lorraine, a scion of the petty noble house of Thicourt-Montreuil; his parents were Gerard of Thicourt-Montreuil and Adelaide of Dampierre. After becoming Archdeacon of the churches of Verdun, Toul, and Metz, he became Provost of the church of St. Gangulphus (French: Collégiale Saint-Gengoult) in Toul and of the Augustinian monastery of St. Arnulf of Metz (German: Stift Sankt Arnual) in Saarbrücken, all then within the borders of the Holy Roman Empire. Here he became identified with the reform party opposed to lay investiture, gaining thereby the enmity of Bishop Adalbero IV, and went in person to Rome to secure the bishop's deposition from Pope Paschal II. On his return he brought about the election of Theotger, Abbot of the Benedictine monastery of St.-George-in-the-Black-Forest, who was consecrated against his will in July 1118, and, being prevented from entering his diocese by the imperial party, died in 1120.

Albero then aided in the election of Stephen of Bar, who rewarded his zeal by making him primicerius of Metz. After having been recommended for the vacant Sees of Magdeburg and Halberstadt, both of which he refused, Albero was in 1130 chosen Archbishop of Trier to succeed Meginher. The position was not an easy one, for the church was in need of reform, and the previous occupants of the see had been dominated by the Vogt Ludwig. Albero could not be induced to accept the burden until Pope Innocent II summoned him to a Synod at Reims in 1131, and even threatened him with suspension from his priestly functions. He was consecrated by the Pope himself at Vienne sometime between 27 February and 7 March 1132.

Albero vigorously pursued the work of reform. He restored peace and order in his archdiocese, and before his death made it one of the most important in Germany. Having twice attended the court of the Emperor Lothair II (once in March 1135 at Bamberg and once around the turn of the years 1135/36 at Speyer), in 1136 he accompanied the Emperor on his expedition into Italy, whither he had been summoned by Innocent II to resist the aggressions of Roger II of Sicily, one of the adherents of the antipope Anacletus II. In the dispute which arose between the Pope and the Emperor, Albero showed himself a staunch defender of the Papal cause, and on his return in 1137 Innocent made him Primate of Belgian Gaul and Papal Legate in Germany.

After the death of Lothair, Albero took an active part in the election at Coblenz of Conrad III, founder of the Hohenstaufen dynasty. As the Archbishopric of Mainz was vacant at that time and the Archbishop of Köln had not yet been consecrated, Innocent appointed Albero to direct their votes. Although the claims of Henry the Proud, the most powerful of the princes of the Empire, were thereby passed over, Conrad was nevertheless able to gain swift approval for his election, even from those princes who had not been present for the vote.

In 1148, Pope Eugenius III visited Trier, after presiding at the Council of Reims, and was entertained by Albero with great splendour. Among his friends Albero counted Norbert of Xanten and Bernard of Clairvaux, who supported his efforts for the restoration of religious discipline in his archdiocese.

Albero died at Coblenz in 1152.

Preceded by Meginher	Archbishop of Trier; 1131–1152	Succeeded by Hillin of Falmagne
