= Gesta Adalberonis =

The Gesta Adalberonis or Gesta Alberonis ("Deeds of Albero") is a biography of Adalbero, Archbishop of Trier (1131–52), written in medieval Latin prose by Balderic of Florennes. There is also a Gesta Alberonis metrica anonyma, an anonymous biography of Albero's life down to 1145, written in hexameters.

Balderic was born in Florennes and became a scholar in Paris, where he first met Albero in 1147. The archbishop invited him to come head the school at the cathedral of Trier, and he later served as provost of the college of Saint Simeon housed in the Porta Nigra. He wrote his life of Albero shortly after the latter's death. He himself disappears from the record after 1163 and presumably died around that time. He was praised for his scholarship by Wibald.

The Gesta's account of Albero's youth is mostly legendary, but his years as bishop are reliably covered, especially those portions describing that to which Balderic was an eyewitness. The work is biography and, although the author heeps praise on the subject, it is not hagiography.

== Sources ==
- Balderic [Baldericus], "Gesta Alberonis archiepiscopi Trevirorum", Monumenta Germaniae Historica, Scriptores, VIII, 243–67.
- Balderic [Balderich], A Warrior Bishop of the Twelfth Century: The Deeds of Albero of Trier, Brian A. Pavlac, trans. Toronto: Pontifical Institute of Mediaeval Studies, 2008.
