= Reginald II of Bar =

Count of Bar

Reginald II, Count of Bar
- Died: 25 July 1170
- Noble family: House of Montbéliard
- Spouse: Agnes of Champagne
- Issue: Henry I, Count of Bar Theobald I, Count of Bar Reginald
- Father: Reginald I of Bar
- Mother: Giselle of Vaudémont

Reginald II of Bar (French: Renaut or Renaud) (died 25 July 1170) was a Count of Bar and Lord of Mousson from 1149 till his death. He was the son of Reginald I, Count of Bar and lord of Mousson, and Giselle of Vaudémont.

In 1135, he attended the Council of Hugh of Metz with his father and brother. He took part in the second crusade with his father and brother Theodoric in 1147. His father died during his return. He reestablished wars against his traditional enemies, the Duke of Lorraine and the bishop of Metz.

Reginald was attacked in 1152, escaped to the Abbey of Saint-Mihiel and was excommunicated. After that, he had to make amends to have his excommunication lifted. In 1170, Reginald died and was succeeded by his eldest son, Henry, as Count of Bar and Lord of Mousson.

== Marriage and children ==
Reginald was married in 1155 to Agnes of Champagne (died 1207), daughter of Theobald II (IV), Count of Blois and Champagne and Matilda of Carinthia, and had the following issue:

- Henry I (1158–1190), Count of Bar
- Theobald I (1159 or 1161 – 1214), Count of Bar
- Reginald († 1217), bishop of Chartres (1182–1217)
- Hugh, canon in Chartres

== Sources ==
- Evergates, Theodore (2016). Henry the Liberal: Count of Champagne, 1127-1181. University of Pennsylvania Press.
- Fassler, Margot Elsbeth (2010). The Virgin of Chartres: Making History Through Liturgy and the Arts. Yale University Press.
- Lesort, Andre (1909). Chronique et chartes de l'abbaye de Saint-Mihiel (in French). C. Klincksieck.

Reginald II of Bar House of Montbéliard Died: 25 July 1170
| Preceded by Reginald I | Count of Bar; 1150–1170 | Succeeded by Henry I |
| Preceded by Reginald I | Lord of Mousson; 1150–1170 | Succeeded by Henry I |
