= Étienne de Bar =

Catholic cardinal

Étienne de Bar (died 1163), sometimes Stephen of Bar, was a French cardinal and nephew of Pope Calixtus II.

He was the son of Theodoric I, Count of Montbéliard and Ermentrude of Burgundy (1055–1105), the daughter of William I, Count of Burgundy. He was brought up at Vienne, under the supervision of his uncle, Guy de Bourgogne, Archbishop of Vienne. He was probably in his uncle's entourage when he was summoned to a conference by Pope Gelasius II at Cluny. The pope died on 29 January 1119, before Guy de Bourgogne could reach Cluny; but he arrived at Cluny on February 1, and was elected pope the next day, taking the name Calixtus II.

== Cardinal and bishop ==
Étienne subscribed a papal bull at Benevento on 24 September 1120, it is likely that he was named a cardinal during the Quatuor temporum earlier in September. He was bishop of Metz from 1120 until his death in 1163, though he was prevented from taking possession of the see for a number of years because of the hostility of the emperor, who had not appointed him and had not invested him.

== Rome ==
The pope returned to Rome in mid-December 1120; Cardinal Étienne signed a bull at the Lateran on 3 January 1121, and another on 7 January 1121.

In January 1122, Pope Calixtus, traveling in the kingdom of Naples, held a synod at Cotrone to settle a boundary dispute between two dioceses. Cardinal Étienne was in the papal party and was present at the negotiations.

Cardinal Étienne was in Rome at the Lateran on 6 April 1123, when he subscribed a bull for his uncle along with thirty-three other cardinals, confirming the decisions about the consecration of bishops on the island of Corsica, and condemning the pamphlets of the Pisatans.

Étienne de Bar was in the Moselle valley in the late spring and early summer 1124. Archbishop Bruno of Trier had died on 25 April, and his successor was being installed on 2 July. As one of the suffragan bishops, Étienne of Metz attended the ceremonies in Trier. He created a scandal, however, by insisting on wearing the pallium which his uncle had granted him in the presence of his metropolitan.

Pope Calixtus died on 14 December 1124. He was succeeded, on 21 December by Cardinal Lamberto of Ostia, who took the name Honorius II. The Emperor Henry V died on 23 May 1125, removing one major opponent to Cardinal Étienne's possession of the see of Metz. Lothar III was elected King of the Romans on 30 August 1125. He spent Christmas with the emperor and the court at Strasbourg, and on 28 December 1125 he subscribed an imperial charter. He was still having trouble taking possession of his diocese, however, due to the opposition of the commune of Metz and of the local notab les, who had usurped the property belonging to the bishopric during the previous decade. Bishop Étienne had to conduct religious ceremonies at the hermitage at Mont S. Quentin.

On 5 May 1126, at the Lateran Palace, Cardinal Étienne and twenty-two other cardinals signed the bull of Pope Honorius II which ended the dispute between the bishops of Siena and Arezzo over parishes, property, and territory. On 21 July of the same year he was at the Lateran again, and signed the decree along with thirty-seven other cardinals restoring to the archbishop of Pisa the right to consecrate bishops for Sardinia. On 7 May 1128, Étienne signed a bull along with thirty-two other cardinals guaranteeing the privileges of two custodians of the Lateran Palace.

== Metz ==
Pope Honorius II died on 13 February 1130. His successor Innocent II was elected uncanonically on the same day, or the next day. On 14 February a counter-election took place, in which Petrus Petri Leonis was elected Anacletus II. The majority of the cardinals and the people of Rome supported Anacletus. There is no indication that Étienne de Bar had anything to do with either election.

In 1130, Bishop Étienne de Bar reconstituted the old church of Notre Dame de la Ronde as a collegiate church, and endowed six canonries to serve the church.

Archbishop Meginher of Trier died on 1 October 1130. In 1131, during the politicking over choosing a successor, Bishop Étienne argued with the clergy and laity over one candidate after another, successfully diminishing each's chances. The discussions may have been prolonged because of the necessity of the higher clergy to attend the synod of Pope Innocent II at Liège on 22 March 1131. Both Bishop Étienne and the Primicerius of the cathedral of Metz, Adalberon, are stated to have attended. Finally, he managed to secure all the votes for his own candidate, his friend Adalberon. Adalberon had previously been elected bishop of Magdeburg, which he refused, and then bishop of Halberstadt, which he also refused. When he was elected archbishop of Trier on 19 April 1131, he attempted to refuse again, and carried his case directly to Pope Innocent II, who was holding a council in Reims on 24—26 October 1131. Without going into the matter, Innocent ordered Adalberon to take a seat on the bench of bishops. Following his consecration, Bishop Étienne conducted him to Trier, where they worked to reestablish order and peace. Baldericus of Trier, however, states that Adalberon had to follow Pope Innocent as far as Vienne, where, in the first week of March 1132, he was finally consecrated a bishop by the pope personally.

On 20 December 1132, Cardinal Adenulfus of Santa Maria in Cosmedin subscribed a document for Pope Innocent II. The document was signed in Florence, since Innocent and his supporters had not been allowed back into Rome since their expulsion in May or June 1130. The party of Innocent II had obviously replaced Cardinal Étienne at the deaconry of Santa Maria in Cosmedin, at least notionally.

In March 1138, both Bishop Étienne and his metropolitan Archbishop Adalberon of Trier were in Coblenz for the election of a German emperor to succeed Lothair III. The successful candidate, supported actively by the two Lorrainers, was Conrad von Hohenstaufen, who became Conrad III at his election on 7 March. He was crowned on 13 March in Aachen.

Inspired by the crusading spirit, roused by Pope Eugenius III and Bernard of Clairvaux, Bishop Étienne took the cross in 1146, along with the Count of Maurienne and the Marquis of Monferrat. The army departed on the Second Crusade in June 1147 and arrived in Antioch in March 1148. The ill-fated siege of Damascus was a distraction, and the crusade failed to achieve its objectives. When Bishop Étienne returned in 1150, he found the entire area being ravaged by wars.

The abbey of Canons Regular at Nôtre-Dame d'Autrey was founded by Bishop Étienne around 1150, receiving its first members from the abbey of Arrouaise. The abbey was located some miles south of Ramberviller.

In 1151 serious trouble broke out between the monks of Hastiers and the monks of the abbey de Vaussor, the latter in revolt against their abbot. It took pressure from the Emperor Conrad, Pope Eugenius III, the bishop of Liège, and Étienne de Bar, bishop of Metz, to restore order. In the first week of November, Bishop Étienne held a synod to reply to charges lodged against him by the rebellious monks.

In 1153, serious street fighting broke out among the people of Metz. One of the agitators was Count Renaud de Bar, Cardinal Étienne's nephew. The commune of Metz, under the leadership of their elected Maître-Echevin, was another source of dissention. Troubles also came from rebellious monks in several houses in the area. Over 2,000 people were killed amid widespread looting. Since the disorders seemed to be spreading to other cities and towns of the Moselle valley, archbishop Hillin of Falmagne of Trier, in the absence of Bishop Étienne (who was ill, or, according to Jean Mabillon, unequal to the task), undertook the journey to Clairvaux in order to solicit the aid of Bernard. Though he was already mortally ill, Bernard travelled to Metz and helped to quiet and reconcile the enemies. The Emperor Frederick Barbarossa was at Trier in December, and on 21 December, Bishop Étienne subscribed a charter in favor of the diocese of Cambrai.

Following the death of Pope Adrian IV, there was a contested election on 7 September 1159. The majority of cardinals chose Cardinal Rolando Bandinelli, a minority opted for Cardinal Octavianus de' Monticelli. Octavianus was the candidate of the Emperor, Frederick Barbarossa, who was represented at the election by the Count Palatine of Bavaria, Otto von Wittelsbach. The imperial faction refused to accept their defeat, and acclaimed Octavianus as "Victor IV", while the majority enthroned Rolando as Pope Alexander III. Bishop Étienne de Bar chose to support his feudal overlord and friend, the Emperor Frederick, and therefore entered into a schism with the Roman pontiff.

Despite his age, Bishop Étienne was compelled to take the field again in 1160, to stop the raids into his territories by the Count of Sawerden. The bishop pursued the count to his own castle, captured him, and razed the castle to the ground.

Étienne de Bar, bishop of Metz, died at Metz on 29 December 1163. He was buried in the choir of the cathedral S. Étienne in Metz, dressed in the habit of the monks of Clairvaux. The tomb was opened in 1521, and the remains inspected. His pallium was revealed, adorned with amethysts and rubies.

He was succeeded in the bishopric by his nephew Thierry, the son of his brother Renaud, who was Primicerius of the cathedral and supported by Frederick Barbarossa.

== Sources ==
- Hüls, Rudolf (1977). Kardinal, Klerus und Kirchen Roms: 1049–1130, Tübingen: Max Niemeyer 1977. (in German)
- Jaffé, Philippus (1885). Regesta pontificum Romanorum ab condita Ecclesia ad annum post Christum natum MCXCVIII (in Latin). Vol. Tomus primus (second ed.). Leipzig: Veit.
- Meurisse, Martin (1634). Histoire des evesques de l'eglise de Metz. Metz: Jean Anthoine. pp. 392–410. (in French)
- Parisse, Michel (1972). Étienne de Bar: 1120-1162. Actes des Princes Lorrains / Universite de Nancy II, U.E.R. de Recherche Régionale. Volume 1: Princes ecclésiastiques, Évêques de Metz (Nancy 1972). (in French)
- Viville, Claude Philippe de (1817). Dictionnaire du département de la Moselle Tome I (Metz: Antoine) pp. 319–323. (in French)
