= Château de Mousson =

Ruined castle in Mousson, France

Coordinates: 48°54′17″N 6°04′39″E

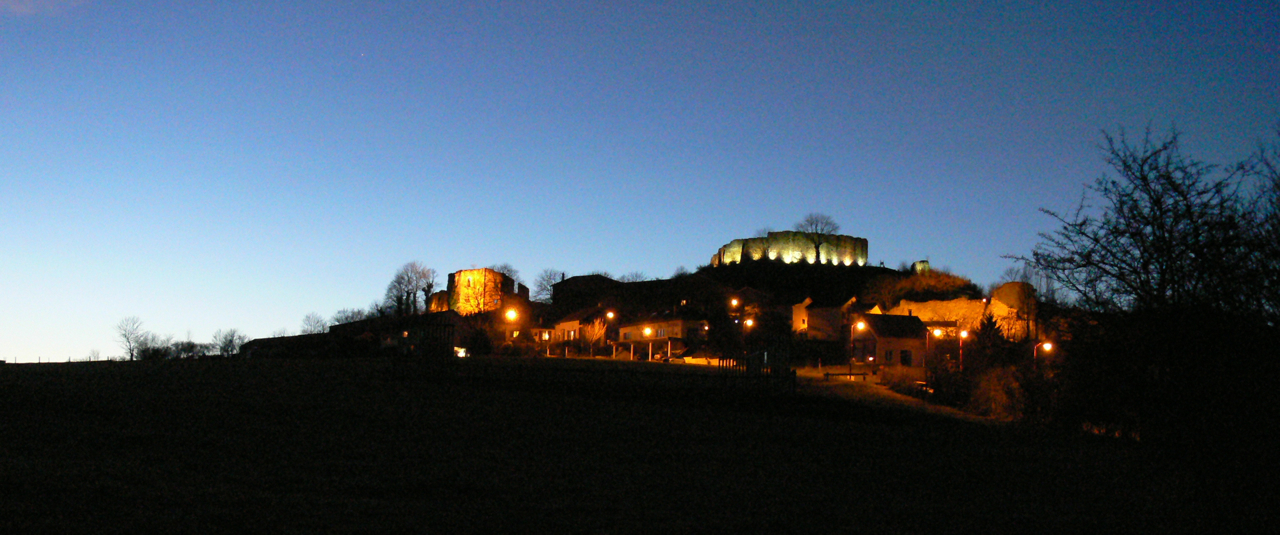
The castle at night

The Château de Mousson is a ruined castle in the commune of Mousson in the Meurthe-et-Moselle département of France.

Until the 13th century, the Château de Mousson was the residence of the Counts of Mousson. On the summit of a hill, it overlooked the valleys of the Seille and the Moselle. It has not resisted the ravages of time, wars and, above all, Cardinal Richelieu.

The 17th century was fatal to the fortress at Mousson. A symbol of the spirit of independence of the people of Lorraine against the power of royal France, the castle was an obstacle to the centralising designs of Louis XIII and Richelieu. In 1633, following the example of many castles in the région and the fortifications of Nancy, the castle was demolished. It was destroyed by the inhabitants of the region, acting under the constraint of French troops.

The castle ruins are the property of the commune. It has been listed since 1932 as a monument historique by the French Ministry of Culture.

== See also ==
- List of castles in France
