= Deicolus =

Christian saint, brother of St. Gall

Saint Deicolus
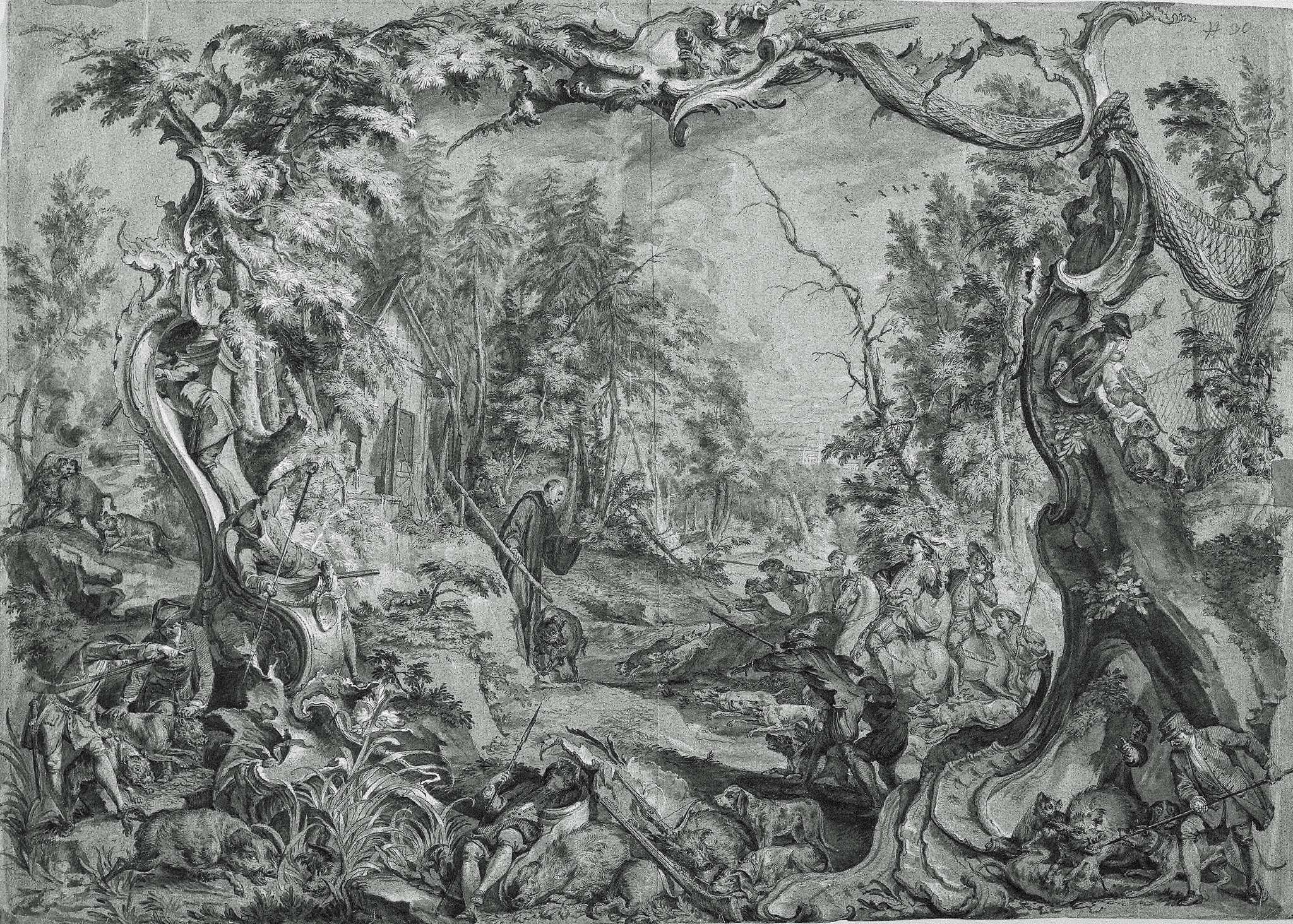
- Saint Deicolus and the Boar, Johann Wolfgang Baumgartner

Abbott
- Born: c. 530; Leinster
- Died: 18 January 625
- Venerated in: Catholic Church; Eastern Orthodox Church
- Canonized: Pre-congregation (and pre-East–West Schism of 1054)
- Major shrine: Lure, France
- Feast: 18 January
- Attributes: Ray of light; depicted as a hermit; a wild boar hunted by King Clothaire takes refuge at his feet
- Patronage: childhood illnesses

Deicolus (also Déicole, Domgall, other variations; (Note: Variations of his name include: Dichuil, Deel, Deicola, Deicuil, Delle, Desle, Dichul, Dicuil) c. 530 – January 18, 625) is venerated as a saint in both the Catholic and Eastern Orthodox churches. He was an elder brother of Saint Gall.

== Life ==
Born in Leinster, Deicolus and his brother, Gall, studied at Bangor Abbey in County Down. He was selected to be one of the twelve followers to accompany Columbanus on his missionary journey. After a short stay in Great Britain in 576 he journeyed to Gaul and laboured with Columbanus in Austrasia and Burgundy. Deicolus is believed to have resided with Columbanus at Luxeuil from c.590 onwards.

When Columbanus was expelled by Theuderic II, in 610, Deicolus, then eighty years of age, determined to follow his master, but was forced, after a short time, to give up the journey, and remained behind alone, establishing a hermitage at a nearby church dedicated to Saint Martin in a place called Lutre, or Lure, in the Diocese of Besançon, to which he had been directed by a swineherd.

Until his death, he became the apostle of this district, where he was given a church and a tract of land by Berthelde, widow of Weifar, the lord of Lure. Soon a noble abbey was erected for his many disciples, and the Rule of St. Columbanus was adopted. Numerous miracles are recorded of Deicolus, including the suspension of his cloak on a sunbeam and the taming of wild beasts.

Clothaire II, King of Burgundy, recognised the virtues of Deicolus and considerably enriched the Abbey of Lure, also granting Deicolus the manor, woods, fisheries, etc., of the town which had grown around the monastery. Feeling his end approaching, Deicolus gave over the government of his abbey to Columbanus, one of his young monks, and retreated to a little oratory he had built a small chapel in honor of the Holy Trinity, where he died on 18 January, about 625.

== Veneration ==
His feast is celebrated on 18 January. So revered was his memory that his name (Dichuil), under the slightly disguised form of Deel and Deela, is still borne by most of the children of the Lure district. His Acts were written by a monk of his own monastery in the tenth century.

His cultus was strong in the area of Lure well into the nineteenth century, when children's clothes were washed in a spring associated with Deicolus that was reputed to cure childhood illnesses.
