= Vaudémont =

- Commune
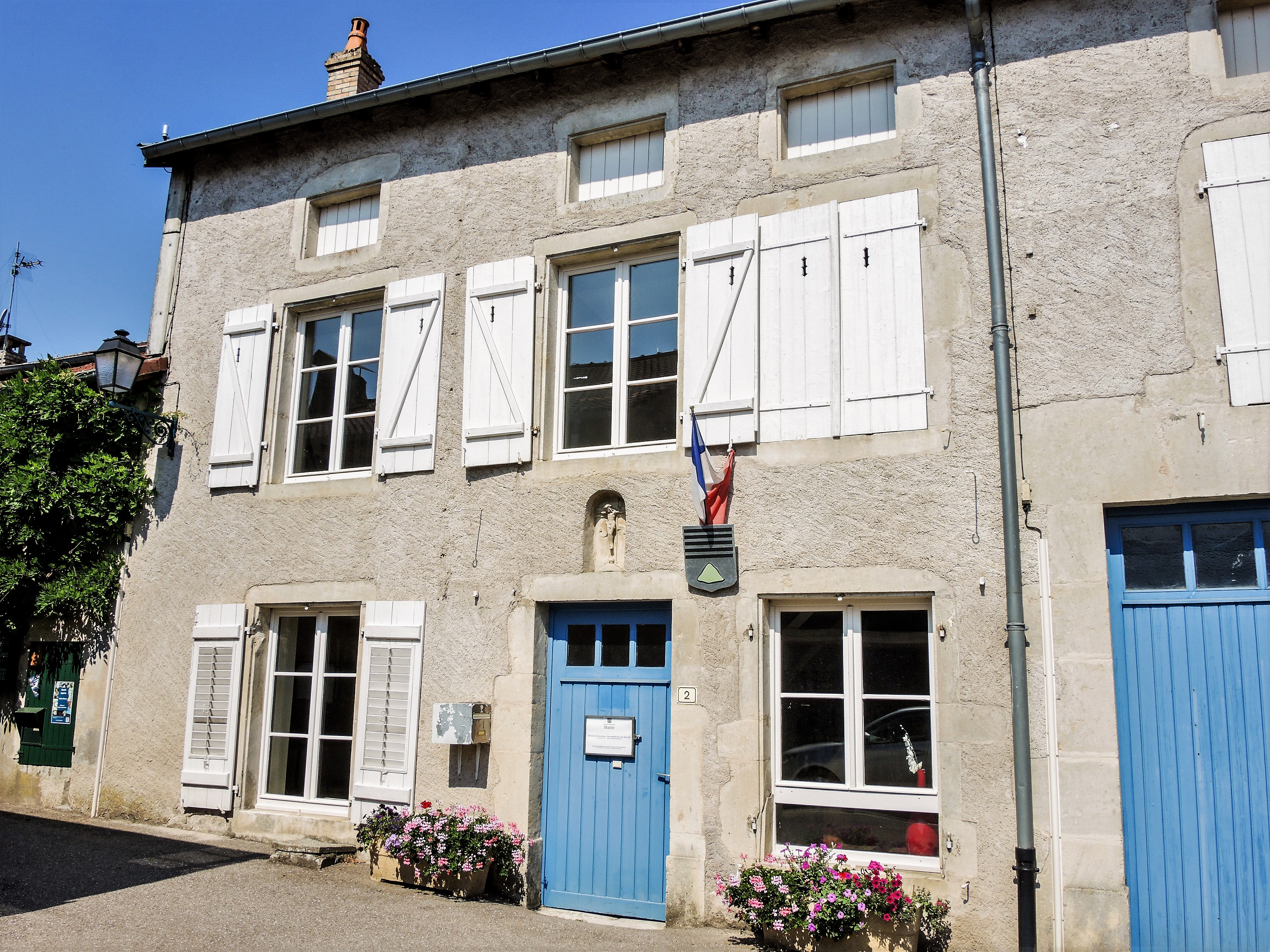
- The town hall in Vaudémont

- Coat of arms
- Location of Vaudémont
- Location within France Location within Grand Est
- Coordinates: 48°25′03″N 6°03′25″E
- Country: France
- Region: Grand Est
- Department: Meurthe-et-Moselle
- Arrondissement: Nancy
- Canton: Meine au Saintois
- Intercommunality: CC Pays du Saintois

Government
  - Mayor (2022–2026): Remi Pereaux
- Area^{1}: 5.76 km^{2} (2.22 sq mi)
- Elevation: 460 m (1,510 ft)
- Highest elevation: 541 m (1,775 ft)
- Lowest elevation: 329 m (1,079 ft)
- Population (2023): 70
  - Density: 12/km^{2} (31/sq mi)
- Time zone: UTC+01:00 (CET)
  - Summer (DST): UTC+02:00 (CEST)
- INSEE/Postal code: 54552 /54330
- ^{1} French Land Register data, which excludes lakes, ponds, glaciers > 1 km^{2} (0.386 sq mi or 247 acres) and river estuaries.

Vaudémont (French pronunciation: [vodemɔ̃]) is a commune in the Meurthe-et-Moselle department in north-eastern France.

== Sights and monuments ==
- Château de Vaudémont - ruined 11th-century castle protected as a monument historique by the French Ministry of Culture

== See also ==
- Communes of the Meurthe-et-Moselle department
