= Siege of Lure =

Battle during the French conquest of Franche-Comté in 1674

Siege of Lure (1674)
- Part of the Dutch War
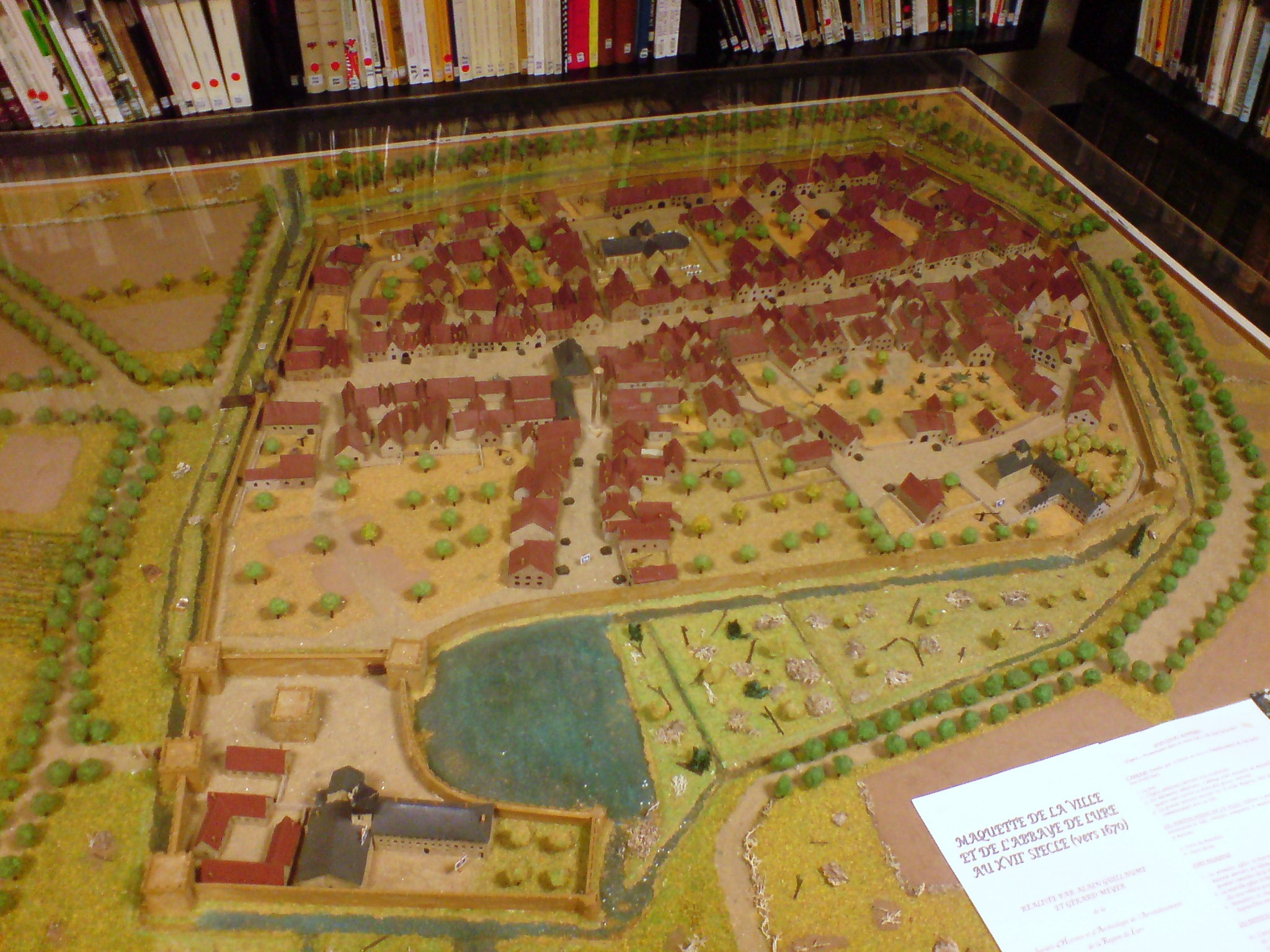
- Model of Lure in 1670
Date	1–3 July 1674
Location	Lure, Franche-Comté, France 47.6836°N 6.4975°E
Result	French victory

Belligerents
Kingdom of France	Franche-Comté; Spanish Empire

Commanders and leaders
Louis de Clermont d'Amboise de Renel	Jean-François de Massiet

Strength
1,000 cavalry 500 infantry 2 cannons	~250 men 18 cavalry

Casualties and losses
Unknown	Unknown; 18 prisoners

The Siege of Lure of 1674 was a military engagement during the Second Conquest of Franche-Comté, involving the town of Lure, a city associated with, but independent of, the County of Burgundy (Franche-Comté). (Note: The abbey and town of Lure were independent of the County of Burgundy. The abbot held the title of prince of the Holy Roman Empire, answering directly to the emperor without intermediaries. However, the Count of Burgundy historically served as the town's protector.) The siege took place from 1 to 3 July 1674 and pitted French forces against the Comtois and Spanish defenders, to whom the town belonged. Lure was the penultimate Comtois town to fall during the definitive French conquest of Franche-Comté.

== Background ==
The siege occurred during the Dutch War (1672–1678), at the culmination of the Second Conquest of Franche-Comté by Louis XIV, targeting the Franche-Comté, then under the control of Charles II, King of Spain and sovereign count of Burgundy.

During the winter of 1673–1674, the threat of a new French invasion loomed over Franche-Comté, then under Spanish rule. With overwhelming numerical superiority, French forces captured key towns in the County of Burgundy, including Pesmes, Saint-Loup, Lons-le-Saunier, Vesoul, and Gray, during the winter and spring. After the decisive captures of Besançon and Salins in early summer, the Spanish realized that complete occupation of the region was inevitable. By July, only three Comtois towns remained unconquered: Luxeuil, Lure, and Faucogney. Luxeuil was abandoned by its garrison and fell without resistance on 1 July 1674.

Lure was commanded by the Walloon cavalry officer, Colonel de Massiette, who had distinguished himself in several victorious raids and battles, notably alongside Lacuzon. He had previously defended Gray in February and led cavalry during the Siege of Besançon in April. After Besançon's fall, he retreated to Lure with his remaining cavalry.

The French army, numbering 1,500 men, was led by the Champenois noble Louis III de Clermont d'Amboise, Marquis de Renel. When Lure's garrison and inhabitants learned of the approaching French, they resolved to resist, but the town's elites preferred surrender.

== Siege ==
On 1 July, French troops arrived from Luxeuil and surrounded Lure. The Marquis de Renel demanded the defenders' immediate surrender, but Colonel de Massiette defiantly refused. However, the town's bourgeois, dissenting from their commander, secretly negotiated with the French, agreeing to open the town gates covertly at a prearranged signal. The French commander quickly surveyed the terrain and prepared his assault. By the afternoon, the gates were opened, and French forces entered the town unopposed.

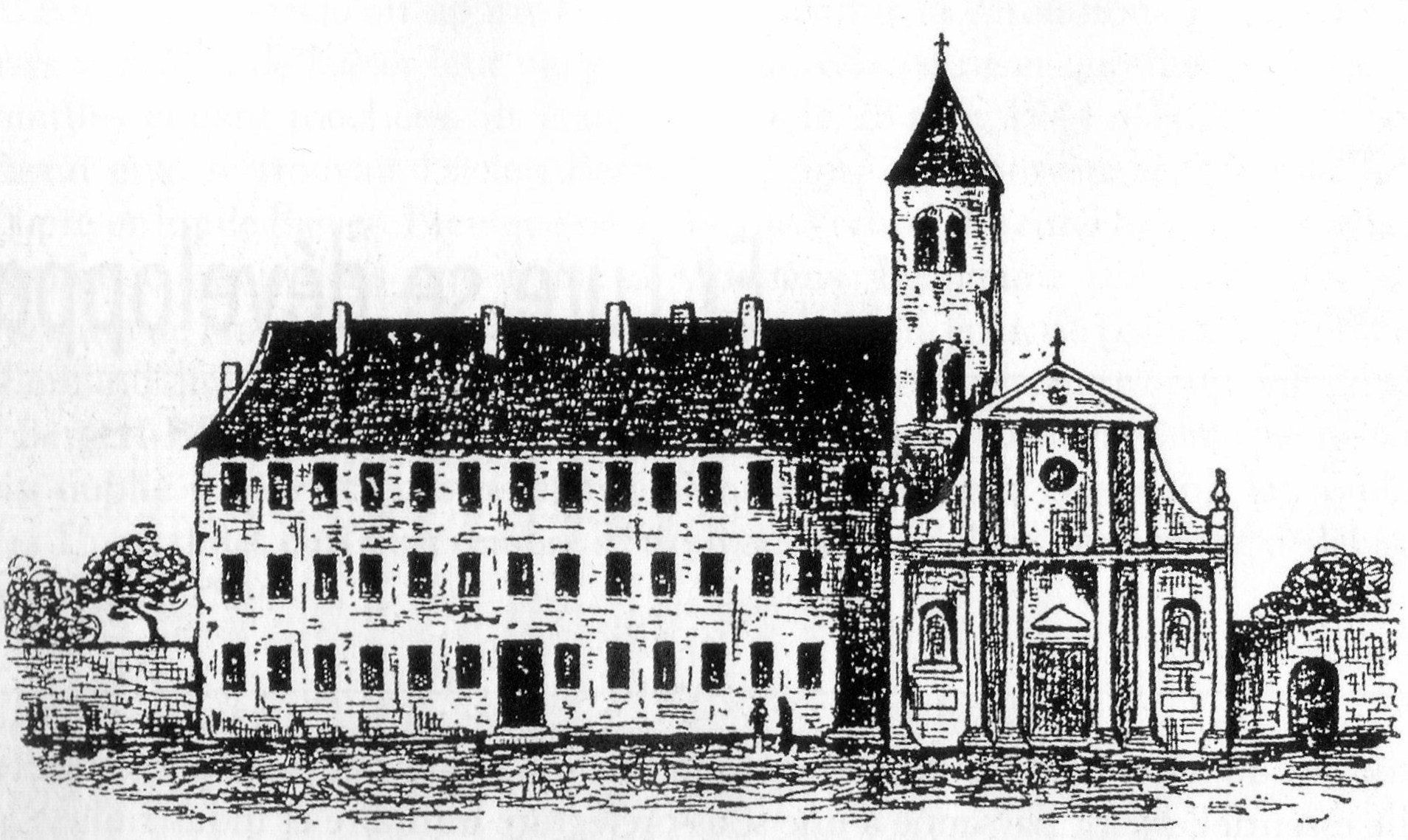
Lure Abbey, where the Comtois defenders held out for two days

On 2 July, the siege of the abbey began. The Marquis de Renel positioned his troops and heavy artillery around the stronghold. Prolonged hot, dry weather had partially dried the marsh, enabling French forces to advance closer to the walls under cover of darkness.

On the morning of 3 July, a relentless artillery barrage began. For six hours, the French cannons fired 60 devastating shots, causing significant damage. By day's end, a breach was opened in the abbey's defenses. Amid the sound of drums, the demoralized and battered Comtois defenders, overwhelmed by continuous bombardment and mounting losses, requested surrender.

== Aftermath ==
The Comtois soldiers were allowed to leave unarmed and return home, while the 18 Flemish cavalrymen and Colonel de Massiette were taken prisoner. The fall of Lure cleared the way for the French to capture the last independent Comtois town, Faucogney.

In the following months, Lure's inhabitants faced severe oppression from the French, prompting them to appeal to the governor, Duke of Duras, who intervened to halt the abuses. Louis XIV later ordered the complete destruction of Lure's fortifications, leaving no trace of them today.

== See also ==
- Charles II of Spain
- Eighty Years' War
- Franche-Comté
- Louis XIV
- Treaty of Nijmegen
