= Theodoric II of Montbéliard =

Count of Montbeliard

Theodoric II, Count of Montbéliard
- Issue: Grandchildren: Amadeus II of Montfaucon
- House: House of Montbéliard
- Father: Theodoric I, Count of Montbéliard

Theodoric II (ca. 1080 – January 1163) was Count of Montbéliard (1105–1163). He was the son of Theodoric I, Count of Montbéliard, Bar and Verdun, and Ermentrude of Burgundy.

He received first possessions of the family, but they were chased by his subjects because of his bad temper. After the death of his father in 1105, he received the county of Montbéliard, becoming its count that same year. He played an important role with emperors, participating in the Concordat of Worms. He had also founded several monasteries.

His wife is unknown. He had the following issue:

- Theodoric III, who died between 1155 and 1160. Married to Gertrude Habsburg, the daughter of Werner II, Count of Habsburg
- Sophie († 1148), married in 1128 to Richard II, Count of Montfaucon. It was their son, Amadeus II of Montfaucon, who succeeded his grandfather.
- Stephanie, married to Folmar, Count of Sarrewerden
- Ermentrude, married to Eudes, Count of la Roche

Preceded by Theodoric I of Montbéliard	Count of Montbéliard; 1105–1163	Succeeded by Amadeus II of Montfaucon
