= Murbach =

Commune in Grand Est, France

- Commune
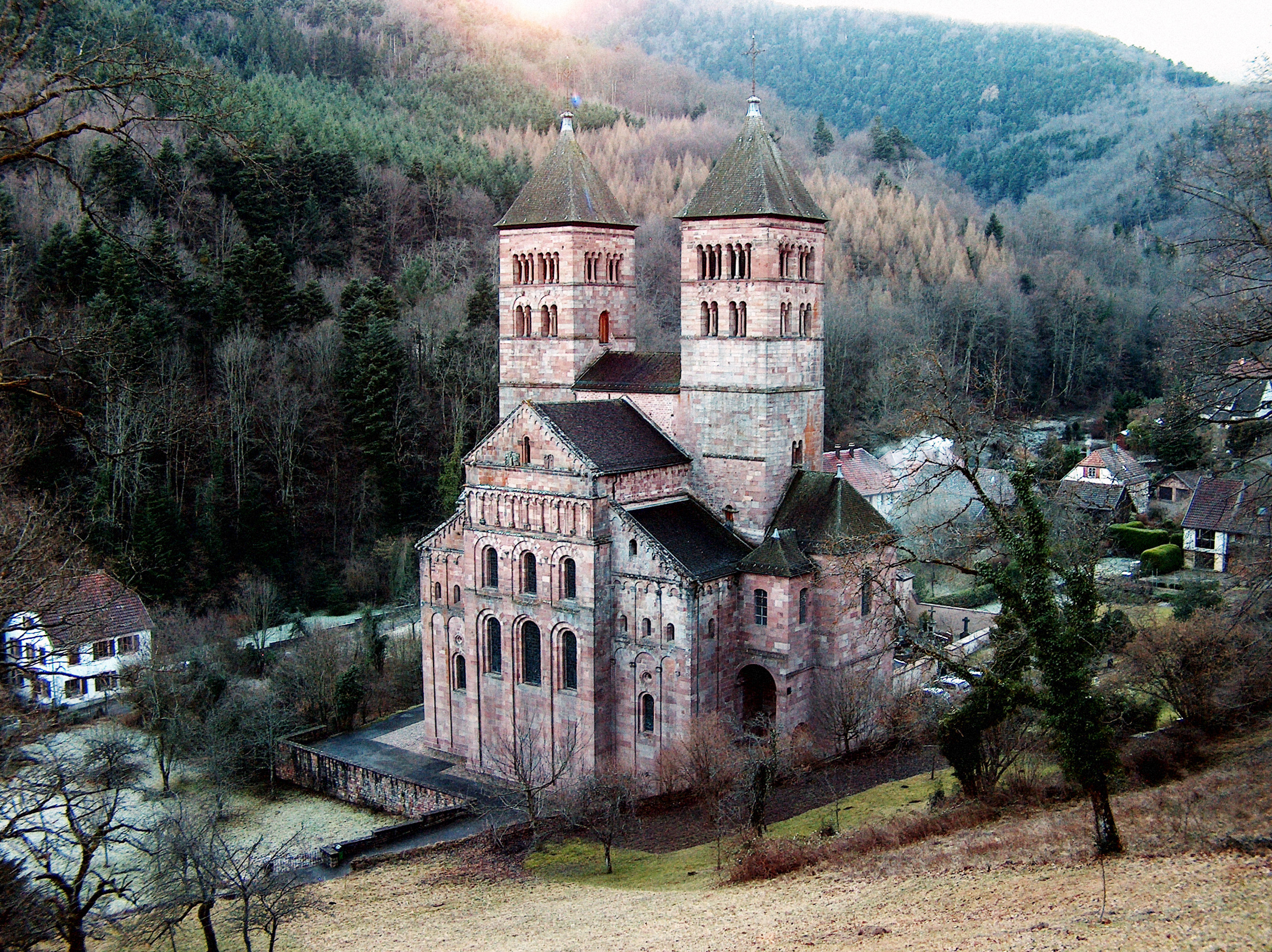
- Romanesque church, Murbach Abbey

- Coat of arms
- Location of Murbach
- Location within France Location within Grand Est
- Coordinates: 47°55′29″N 7°09′29″E
- Country: France
- Region: Grand Est
- Department: Haut-Rhin
- Arrondissement: Thann-Guebwiller
- Canton: Guebwiller
- Intercommunality: Région de Guebwiller

Government
  - Mayor (2020–2026): Maud Hart
- Area^{1}: 6.66 km^{2} (2.57 sq mi)
- Elevation: 420 m (1,380 ft)
- Highest elevation: 1,420 m (4,660 ft)
- Lowest elevation: 396 m (1,299 ft)
- Population (2023): 164
  - Density: 24.6/km^{2} (63.8/sq mi)
- Time zone: UTC+01:00 (CET)
  - Summer (DST): UTC+02:00 (CEST)
- INSEE/Postal code: 68229 /68530
- ^{1} French Land Register data, which excludes lakes, ponds, glaciers > 1 km^{2} (0.386 sq mi or 247 acres) and river estuaries.

Murbach is a commune in the Haut-Rhin department in Grand Est in north-eastern France.

Murbach Abbey is located near Murbach.

== See also ==
- Communes of the Haut-Rhin département
