= Amadeus II of Montfaucon =

- Issue: Walter of Montbéliard
- Father: Maternal Grandfather: Theodoric II, Count of Montbéliard

Amadeus II of Montfaucon (c. 1130–1195) a member of the House of Montfaucon, Count of Montbéliard and Lord of Montfaucon from 1163 until his death. He was the son of Richard II of Montfaucon and Sophie of Montbéliard, daughter of Theodoric II, Count of Montbéliard. He was ultimately succeeded by his son Richard III of Montfaucon.

He first married to Beatrice Grandson-Joinville, then Osilie of Faucogney, and had the following issue:

- Walter I of Montbéliard who was Regent of the Kingdom of Cyprus (1206-1210).
- Richard III who succeed his father
- Agnès of Montfaucon

Preceded by Theodoric II of Montbéliard	Count of Montbéliard; 1163–1195	Succeeded by Richard III of Montfaucon
