= Reginald I of Bar =

Comte de Bar-Le Duc

Reginald I
- Count of Bar
- Born: c. 1080
- Died: 10 March 1149; Mediterranean Sea
- Noble family: House of Montbéliard
- Spouse: Gisele of Vaudémont
- Issue: Reginald II of Bar
- Father: Theodoric I of Montbéliard
- Mother: Ermentrude of Bourgogne

Reginald I (also called "the One-eyed", Reinald I, Renaud I; c. 1080 – 10 March 1149) was Count of Bar (1105–1149). Barrois, during the Middle Ages, was the territory of the counts and dukes of Bar, in the eastern part of present-day France, bordering Lorraine.

He was the son of Count Theodoric I of Montbéliard and Ermentrude, daughter of Count William I of Burgundy.

Reginald's first wife is unknown. He later married Gisele de Vaudémont, widow of Count Rainard III of Toul and daughter of Count Gerard I of Vaudémont and his wife Heilwig von Egisheim. Reginald and Gisele had eight children:

- Hugh de Bar (d. 29 September 1141)
- Reginald II, Count of Bar
- Drogo de Bar
- Dietrich III de Bar (d. 8 August 1171), Bishop of Metz
- Agnes de Bar (d. after 1185), married Albert. Count of Chiny
- Clemence de Bar (1123–1183), married first Alberic II of Dammartin, second Renaud, Count of Clermont, and third Thibaut III de Crépy
- Mathilde de Bar, married Konrad I, Count of Wildgraf von Kyrburg
- Stephaine de Bar (d. 1178), married Hugh III, Seigneur of Broyes and Châteauvillain

Reginald was one of the leaders of the Second Crusade in 1145. He was drowned somewhere in the Mediterranean Sea on his return voyage to Europe on or before 10 March 1149.

Reginald I of Bar succeeded Theodoric II of Bar (r. 1092–1105) who was succeeded in turn by Reginald II of Bar (r. 1150–1170) in 1150.

== Sources ==
- Haynes, Justin; Traill, David A (2021). Education of Nuns, Feast of Fools, Letters of Love: Medieval Religious Life in Twelfth-Century Lyric Anthologies from Regensburg, Ripoll, and Chartres. Peeters.
- Péporté, Pit (2011). Constructing the Middle Ages: Historiography, Collective Memory and Nation. Brill.
- Ancestral Roots of Certain American Colonists Who Came to America Before 1700 by Frederick Lewis Weis, Line 144–24.

Reginald I of Bar House of Montbéliard Born: c. 1080 Died: 10 March 1149
Preceded by Theodoric II of Bar	Count of Bar; 1105–1149	Succeeded by Reginald II of Bar
