= Lure, Haute-Saône =

Lure
- Subprefecture and commune
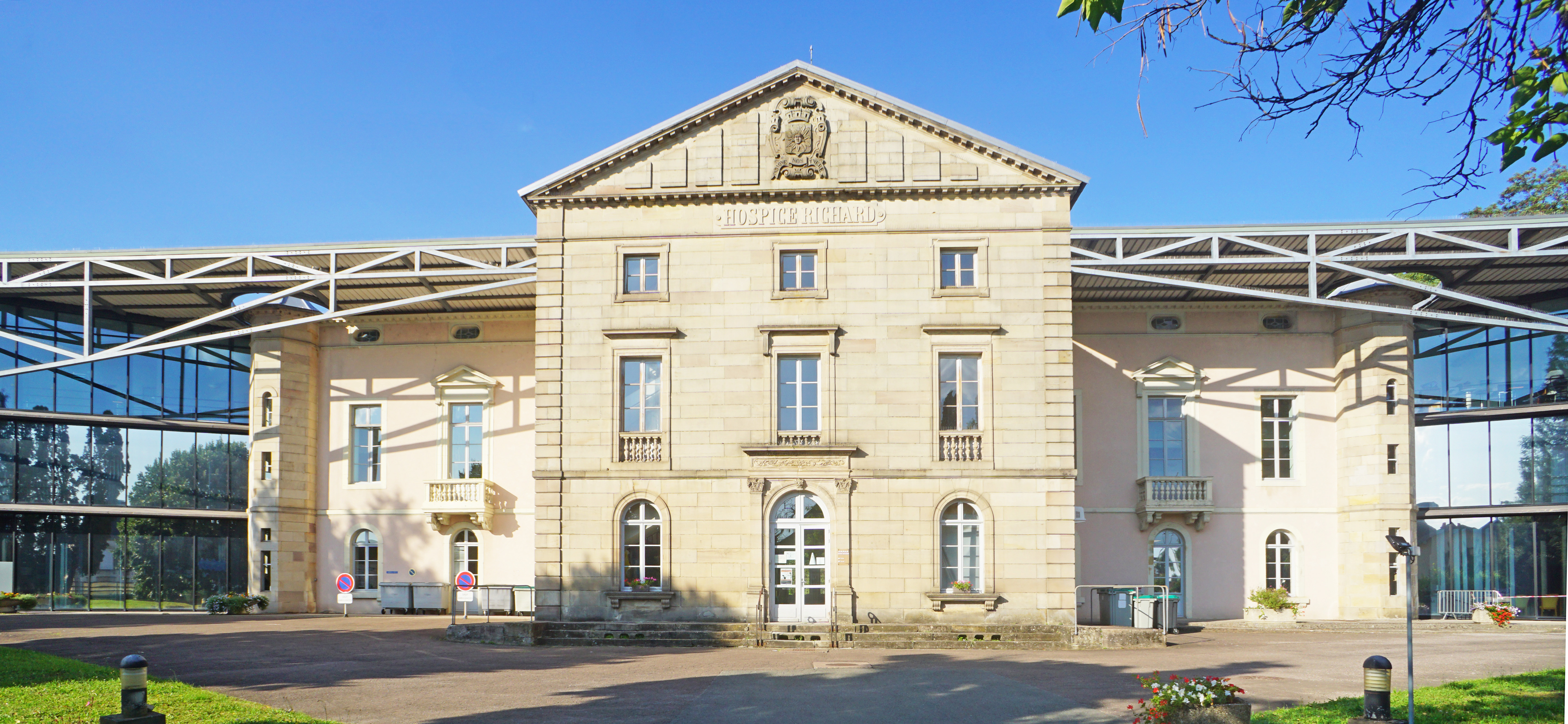
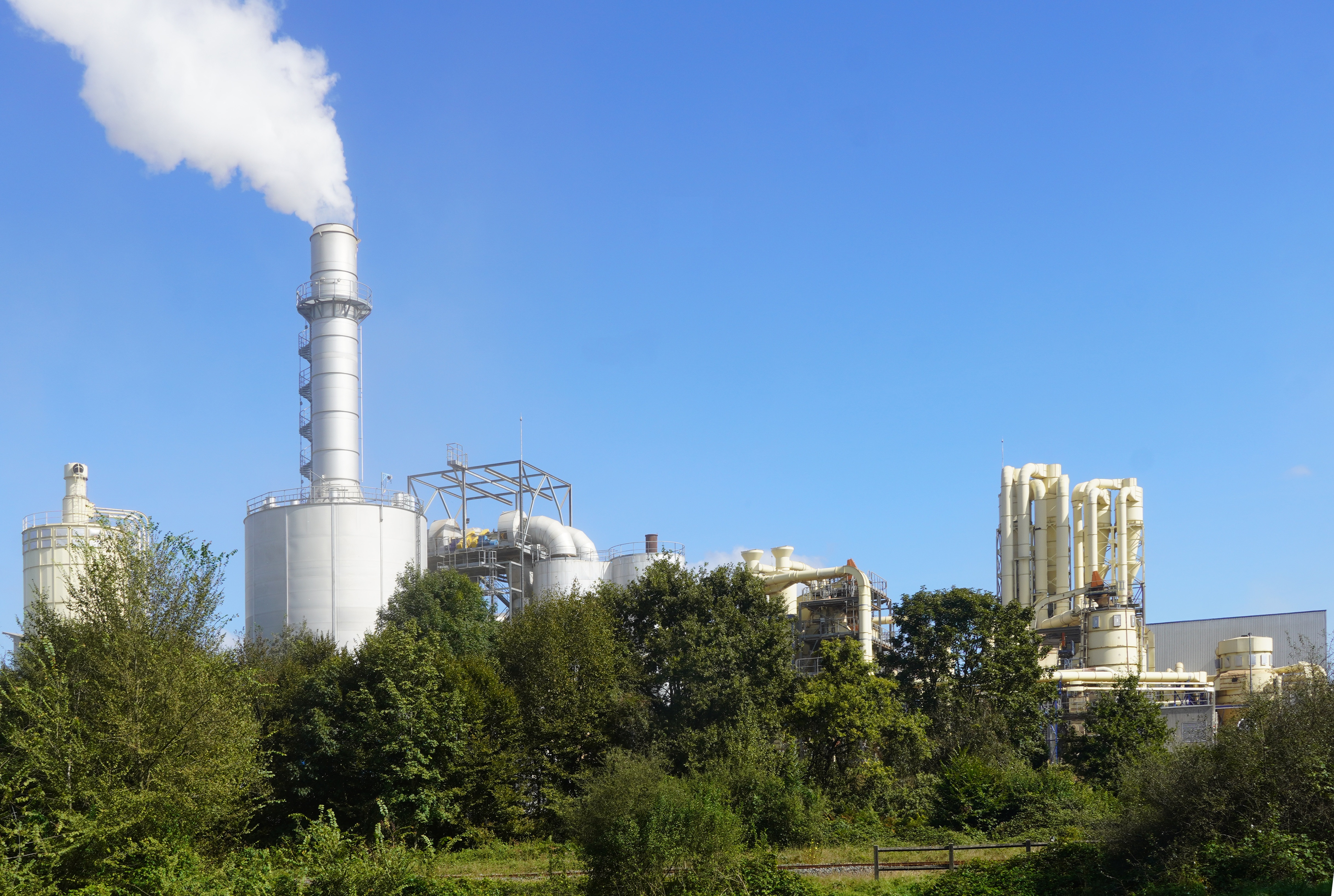
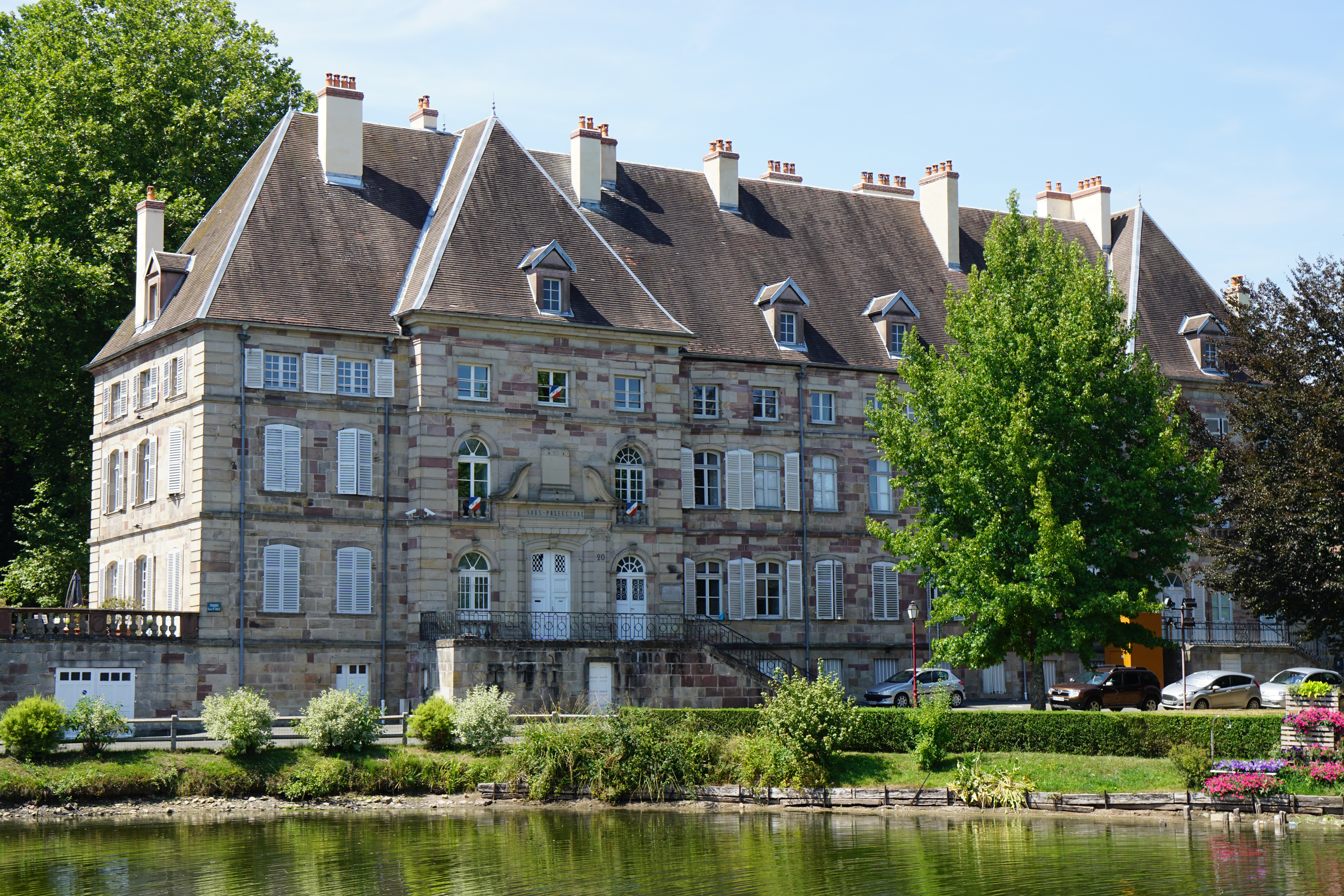
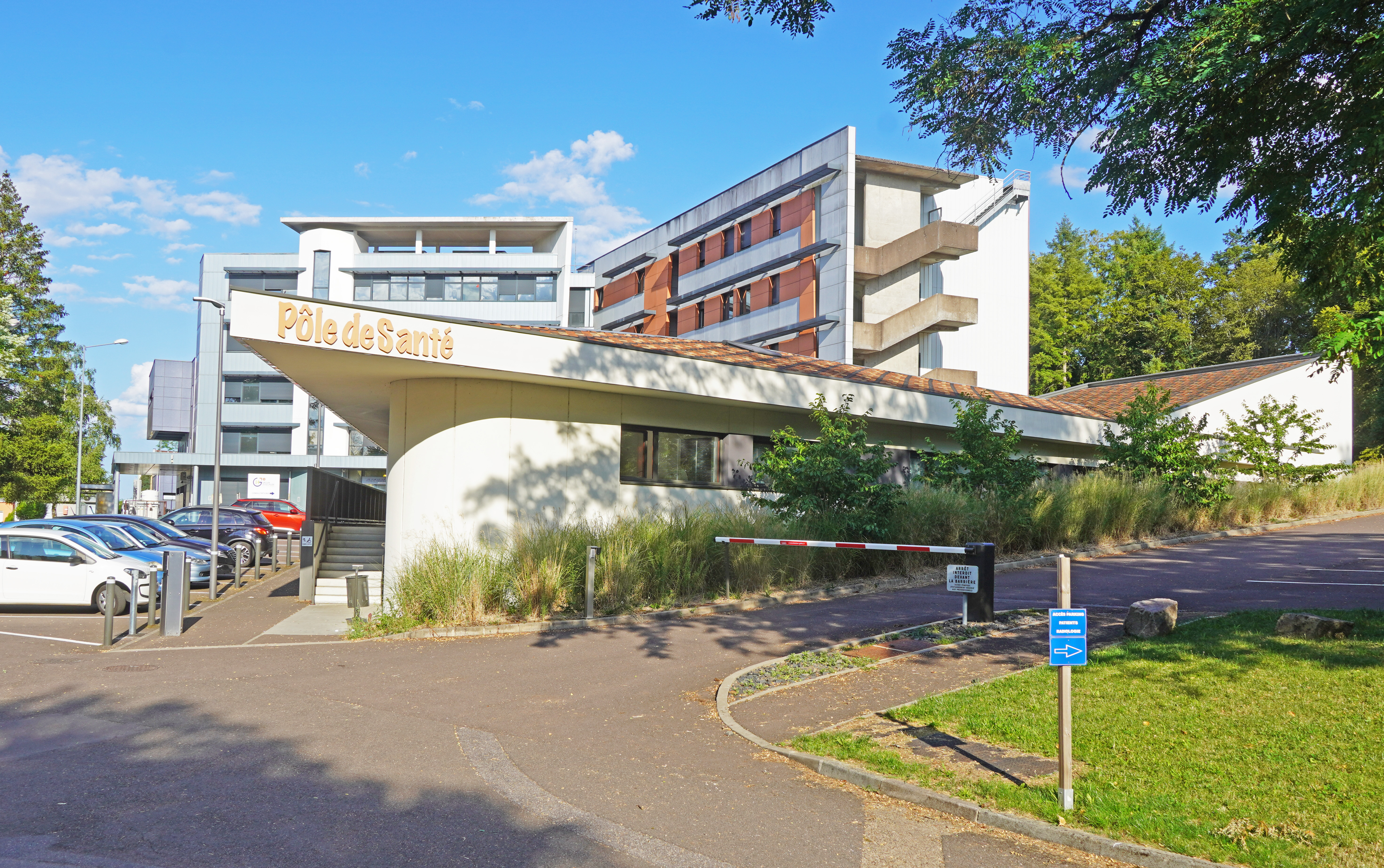
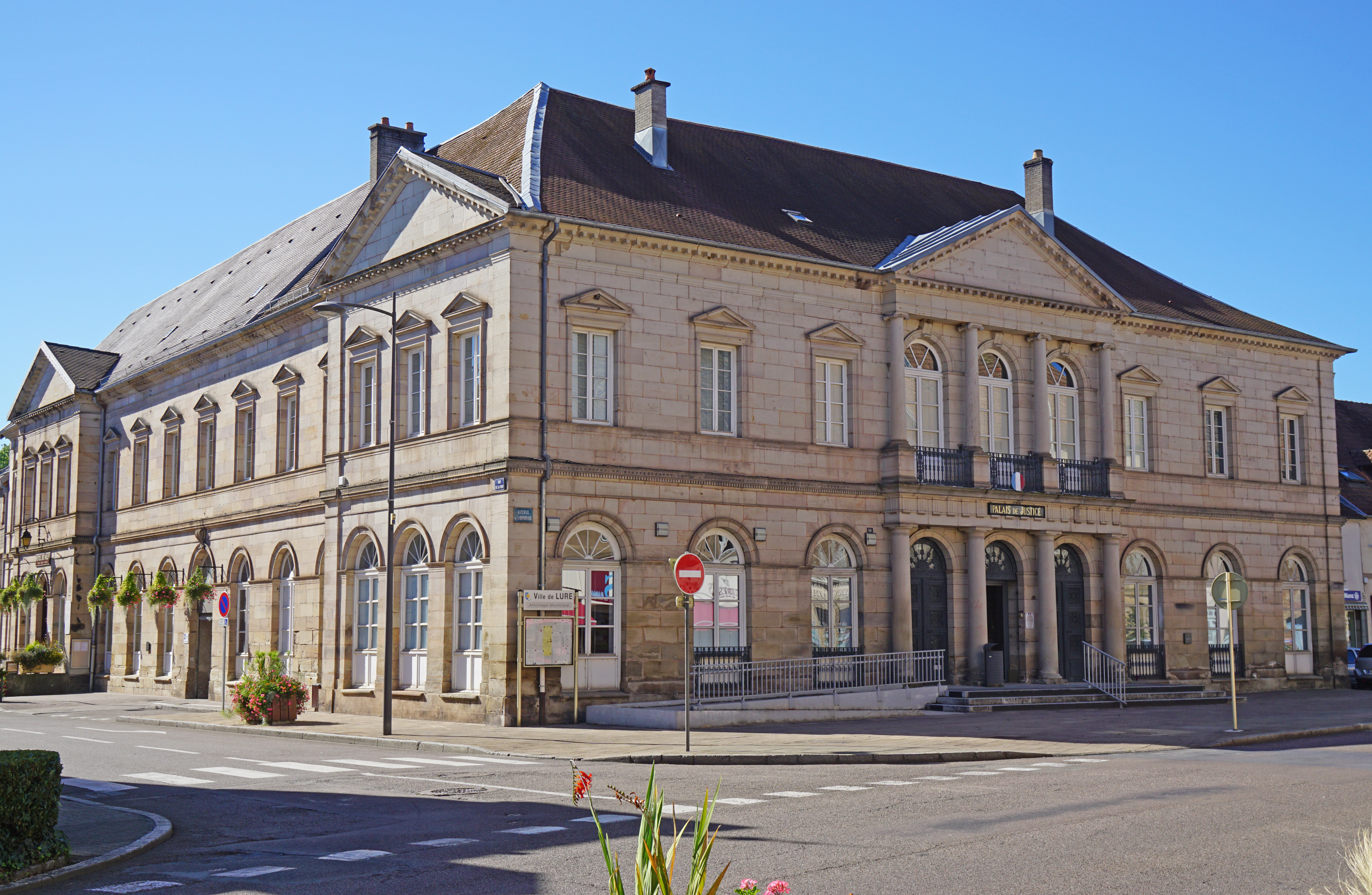
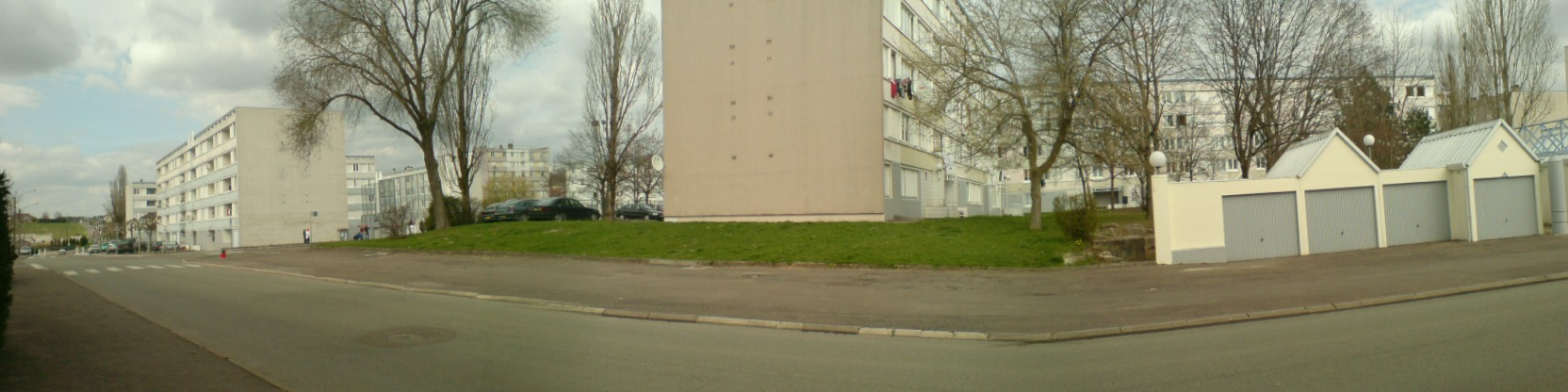

- Coat of arms
- Location of Lure
- Location within France Location within Bourgogne-Franche-Comté
- Coordinates: 47°41′01″N 6°29′51″E
- Country: France
- Region: Bourgogne-Franche-Comté
- Department: Haute-Saône
- Arrondissement: Lure
- Canton: Lure-1 and 2
- Intercommunality: Pays de Lure

Government
  - Mayor (2020–2026): Éric Houlley
- Area^{1}: 24.31 km^{2} (9.39 sq mi)
- Elevation: 293 m (961 ft)
- Highest elevation: 353 m (1,158 ft)
- Lowest elevation: 284 m (932 ft)
- Population (2023): 7,877
  - Density: 324.0/km^{2} (839.2/sq mi)
- Time zone: UTC+01:00 (CET)
  - Summer (DST): UTC+02:00 (CEST)
- INSEE/Postal code: 70310 /70200
- ^{1} French Land Register data, which excludes lakes, ponds, glaciers > 1 km^{2} (0.386 sq mi or 247 acres) and river estuaries.

Lure (French pronunciation: [lyʁ]) is a commune in the Haute-Saône department in the region of Bourgogne-Franche-Comté in eastern France.

At 7,877 inhabitants (2023), Lure is the third most populous town in the département, smaller than Vesoul and Héricourt, but larger than Luxeuil-les-Bains and Gray.

The Abbey of Lure was situated here. In the seventh century, Clothaire II recognised the virtues of Saint Deicolus and considerably enriched the Abbey of Lure, also granting Deicolus the manor, woods, fisheries, etc. of the town which had grown around the monastery.

== Population ==
Historical population
Year	Pop.	±% p.a.
1968	7,415	—
1975	8,639	+2.21%
1982	9,130	+0.79%
1990	8,843	−0.40%
1999	8,727	−0.15%
2007	8,263	−0.68%
2012	8,423	+0.38%
2017	8,207	−0.52%
2023	7,877	−0.68%
Source: INSEE

== Famous people ==
- Thibaut Pinot (professional cyclist)
- Zola (rapper)

== See also ==
- Communes of the Haute-Saône department
- Abbey of Lure
- Siege of Lure
