= Reginald of Bar (bishop of Chartres) =

French bishop

- Bishop of Chartres
- Native name: Renaud de Bar
- Diocese: Chartres
- Installed: 1182
- Term ended: 1217

Personal details
- Died: 1217
- Denomination: Roman Catholicism
- Parents: Reginald II, Count of Bar; Adèle de Champagne
- Coat of arms

Reginald of Bar, also known as Renaud de Mouçon, was bishop of Chartres from 1182 until his death in 1217. His parents were Reginald II of Bar and his wife Adèle de Champagne. Via his mother he was first cousin to king Philip II of France, who facilitated his career. He was named canon and treasurer of Saint-Martin de Tours and was then elected bishop of Chartres in 1182. He played an important role in France and Champagne and participated in the Third Crusade.

Returning to France, in 1199 he negotiated the marriage of Theobald III of Champagne to Blanche of Navarre. After Theobald's death and during Blanche's regency, he held great influence in the court at Champagne. During the Champagne War of Succession he was part of a tribunal charged with ruling on the succession. In 1210 he led a detachment of crusaders in the Albigensian Crusade and participated in the siege of Termes.

== Sources ==
- Fassler, Margot Elsbeth (2010). The Virgin of Chartres: Making History Through Liturgy and the Arts. Yale University Press. ISBN 9780300110883.
- Harris, Max (2011). Sacred Folly: A New History of the Feast of Fools. Cornell University Press. ISBN 9780801461613.
- Sumption, Jonathan (1999). The Albigensian Crusade. Faber and Faber. ISBN 9780571200023.
- Thompson, Kathleen (2002). Power and Border Lordship in Medieval France. Boydell & Brewer. ISBN 9780861932542.
