= Mousson =

- Commune
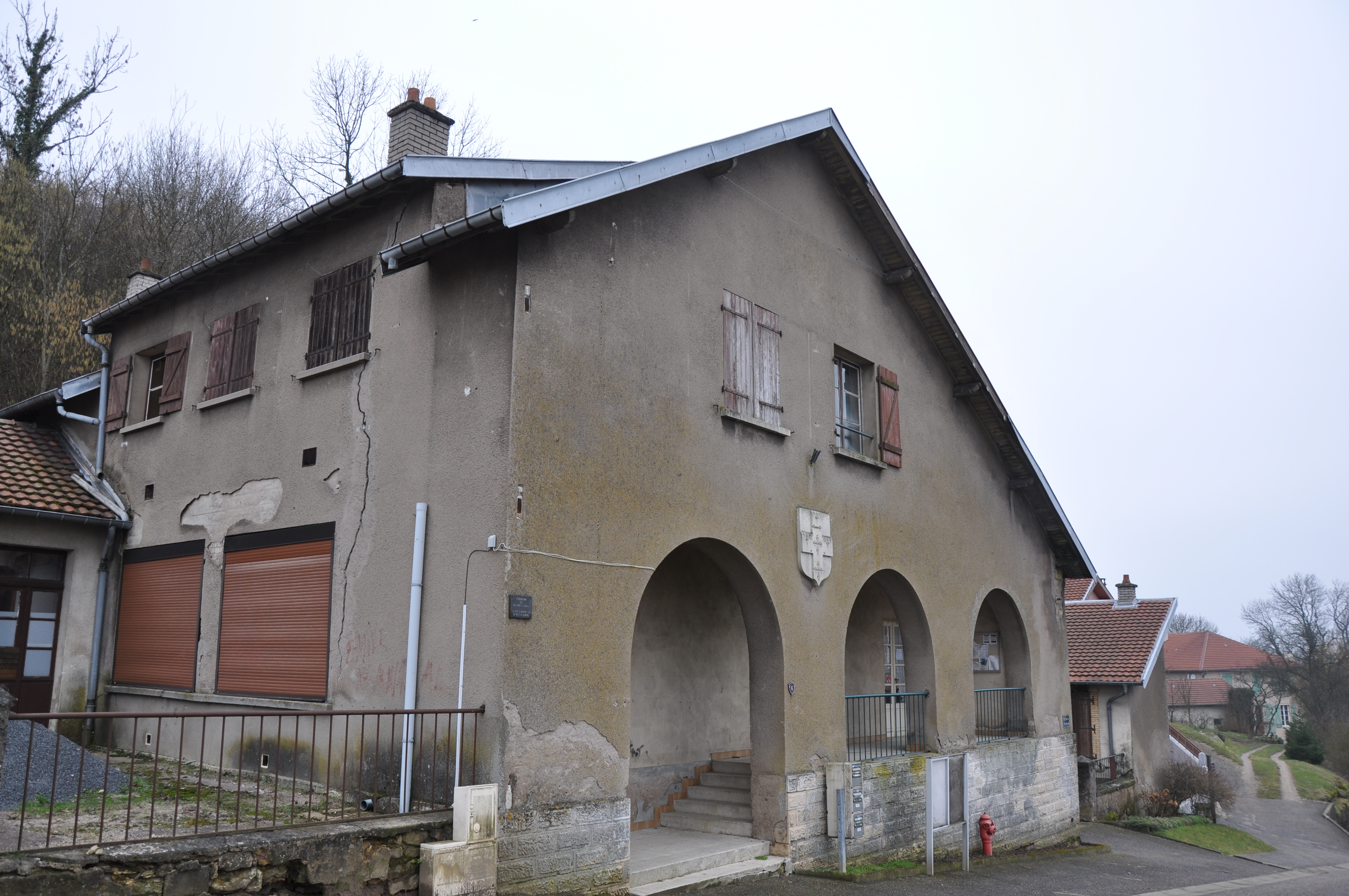
- The town hall in Mousson

- Coat of arms
- Location of Mousson
- Location within France Location within Grand Est
- Coordinates: 48°54′21″N 6°04′48″E
- Country: France
- Region: Grand Est
- Department: Meurthe-et-Moselle
- Arrondissement: Nancy
- Canton: Pont-à-Mousson

Government
  - Mayor (2020–2026): Fabrice Cesar
- Area^{1}: 5.73 km^{2} (2.21 sq mi)
- Elevation: 326 m (1,070 ft)
- Highest elevation: 380 m (1,250 ft)
- Lowest elevation: 204 m (669 ft)
- Population (2023): 101
  - Density: 17.6/km^{2} (45.7/sq mi)
- Time zone: UTC+01:00 (CET)
  - Summer (DST): UTC+02:00 (CEST)
- INSEE/Postal code: 54390 /54700
- ^{1} French Land Register data, which excludes lakes, ponds, glaciers > 1 km^{2} (0.386 sq mi or 247 acres) and river estuaries.

Mousson (French pronunciation: [musɔ̃]) is a commune in the Meurthe-et-Moselle department in north-eastern France. The village lies on a hilltop, adjacent to the east of Pont-à-Mousson.

== See also ==
- Communes of the Meurthe-et-Moselle department
