= 2024 French legislative election in Doubs =

Following the first round of the 2024 French legislative election on 30 June 2024, runoff elections in each constituency where no candidate received a vote share greater than 50 percent were scheduled for 7 July. Candidates permitted to stand in the runoff elections needed to either come in first or second place in the first round or achieve more than 12.5 percent of the votes of the entire electorate (as opposed to 12.5 percent of the vote share due to low turnout).

== Doubs ==
=== 1st constituency ===
Candidate	Party or alliance		First round		Second round	
Candidate	Party or alliance		Votes	%	Votes	%
Laurent Croizier	Ensemble	Democratic Movement	17,475	33.52	19,324	36.18
Séverine Véziès	New Popular Front	La France Insoumise	16,555	31.76	17,261	32.31
Thomas Lutz	National Rally		16,264	31.20	16,830	31.51
Marielle Pernin	Ecologists	Independent	923	1.77		
Nicole Friess	Far-left	Lutte Ouvrière	780	1.50		
Alain Ruch	Far-left	Independent	133	0.26		
Elisa Moré	Regionalists	Independent	2	0.00		
Total			52,132	100.00	53,415	100.00
Valid votes			52,132	97.19	53,415	97.59
Invalid votes			414	0.77	354	0.65
Blank votes			1,096	2.04	966	1.76
Total votes			53,642	100.00	54,735	100.00
Registered voters/turnout			75,793	70.77	75,796	72.21

=== 2nd constituency ===
Candidate	Party or alliance		First round		Second round	
Candidate	Party or alliance		Votes	%	Votes	%
Dominique Voynet	New Popular Front	The Ecologists	19,160	34.16	31,053	59.95
Eric Fusis	National Rally		16,895	30.12	20,749	40.05
Benoît Vuillemin	Ensemble	Renaissance	15,026	26.79		
Daniel Roy	Miscellaneous right	The Republicans	4,215	7.52		
Brigitte Vuitton	Far-left	Lutte Ouvrière	788	1.41		
Total			56,084	100.00	51,802	100.00
Valid votes			56,084	97.79	51,802	90.19
Invalid votes			408	0.71	1,380	2.40
Blank votes			858	1.50	4,253	7.40
Total votes			57,350	100.00	57,435	100.00
Registered voters/turnout			78,875	72.71	78,894	72.80

=== 3rd constituency ===
Candidate	Party or alliance		First round		Second round	
Candidate	Party or alliance		Votes	%	Votes	%
Matthieu Bloch	Union of the far right	The Republicans	18,795	44.35	21,543	50.76
Nicolas Pacquot	Ensemble	Renaissance	12,806	30.22	20,901	49.24
Virginie Dayet	New Popular Front	Communist Party	9,138	21.56		
Brandon Kemps	Sovereigntist Right	Independent	889	2.10		
Franck Plain	Far-left	Lutte Ouvrière	753	1.78		
Total			42,381	100.00	42,444	100.00
Valid votes			42,381	95.84	42,444	94.89
Invalid votes			692	1.56	596	1.33
Blank votes			1,149	2.60	1,691	3.78
Total votes			44,222	100.00	44,731	100.00
Registered voters/turnout			64,748	68.30	64,751	69.08

=== 4th constituency ===
Candidate	Party or alliance		First round		Second round	
Candidate	Party or alliance		Votes	%	Votes	%
Géraldine Grangier	National Rally		19,863	47.62	22,274	54.85
Magali Duvernois	New Popular Front	Socialist Party	11,776	28.23	18,333	45.15
Philippe Gautier	Ensemble	Horizons	8,527	20.44		
Yves Vola	Ecologists	Independent	906	2.17		
Isabelle Bonnet	Far-left	Lutte Ouvrière	640	1.53		
Total			41,712	100.00	40,607	100.00
Valid votes			41,712	97.26	40,607	92.98
Invalid votes			413	0.96	939	2.15
Blank votes			761	1.77	2,128	4.87
Total votes			42,886	100.00	43,674	100.00
Registered voters/turnout			65,469	65.51	65,484	66.69

=== 5th constituency ===
Candidate	Party or alliance		First round		Second round	
Candidate	Party or alliance		Votes	%	Votes	%
Annie Genevard	The Republicans		20,356	35.20	35,576	62.69
Florianne Jeandenand	National Rally		19,505	33.73	21,173	37.31
Matthieu Cassez	New Popular Front	La France Insoumise	9,709	16.79		
Lucas Boillot	Ensemble	Renaissance	7,176	12.41		
Sonya Morrison	Far-left	Lutte Ouvrière	588	1.02		
Nolann Laurent	Independent		497	0.86		
Total			57,831	100.00	56,749	100.00
Valid votes			57,831	97.53	56,749	95.91
Invalid votes			591	1.00	708	1.20
Blank votes			871	1.47	1,712	2.89
Total votes			59,293	100.00	59,169	100.00
Registered voters/turnout			85,263	69.54	85,273	69.39
