= Matthieu Bloch =

French politician (born 1983)

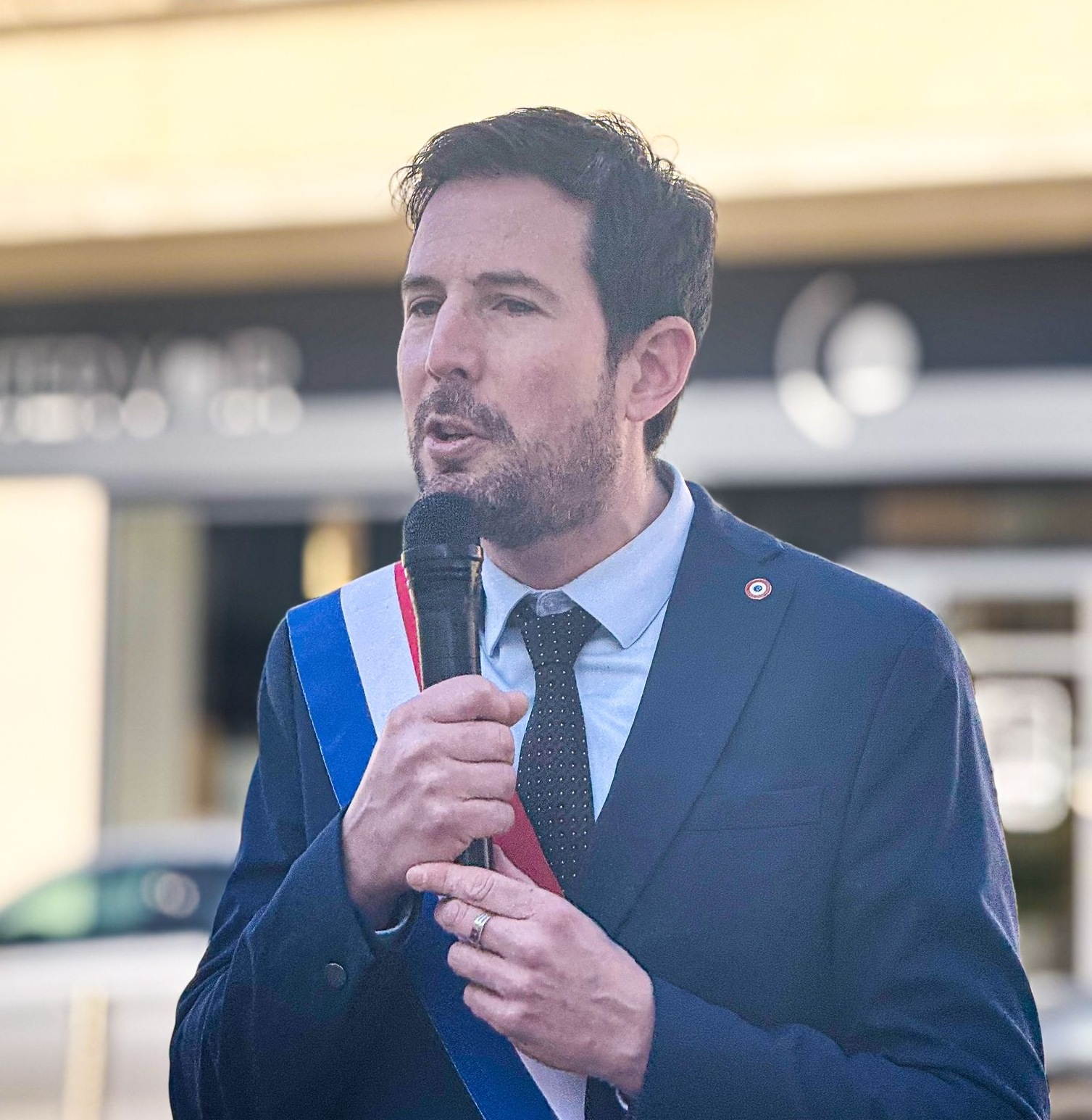
- Bloch in 2025

Member of the National Assembly for Doubs's 3rd constituency
- Incumbent
- Assumed office 8 July 2024
- Preceded by: Nicolas Pacquot

Mayor of Colombier-Fontaine
- In office 25 May 2020 – 5 September 2024
- Preceded by: Danièle Lefèvre
- Succeeded by: Sylvette Faivre

Personal details
- Born: 26 April 1983 (age 43) Audincourt, France
- Party: Union of the Right for the Republic (2024–present)
- Other political affiliations: The Republicans (until 2024)

Matthieu Bloch (French pronunciation: [matjø blɔk]; born 26 April 1983) is a French politician of the Union of the Right for the Republic (UDR) who has represented the 3rd constituency of Doubs in the National Assembly since 2024.

== Biography ==
Then affiliated with The Republicans (LR), Bloch was elected mayor of Colombier-Fontaine, Doubs in 2020, after winning the municipal election against the list led by Philippe Geoffroy.

In the 2022 legislative election, he was the LR candidate in Doubs's 4th constituency. He placed fourth in the first round with 10.7% of the vote. Bloch opposed the Republican Front in the second round and announced that he would vote for the candidate who knew the area best. Outgoing deputy Frédéric Barbier was narrowly defeated by the National Rally (RN) candidate, Géraldine Grangier.

In 2023, Bloch became the departmental secretary of the Doubs The Republicans federation. He was the party's second-in-command in the department, behind the federation's president, Annie Genevard.

In the 2024 legislative election, Bloch supported the LR–RN alliance, although he said he did not approve of the method used by LR president Éric Ciotti. He ran as a candidate for the alliance under the Union of the Right for the Republic in Doubs's 3rd constituency, around Montbéliard, where the outgoing Renaissance deputy, Nicolas Pacquot, was narrowly elected in 2022. Bloch came out well ahead in the first round with 44.4% of the vote, ahead of the outgoing deputy and the French Communist Party candidate; although the latter withdrew to oppose him, Bloch was elected with 50.7% of the second-round vote.

In Parliament, Bloch sits on the Committee on National Defence and the Armed Forces.
