= Joseph Parrenin =

French politician (born 1941)

First Vice President of Franche-Comté
- Incumbent
- Assumed office 24 January 2008
- President: Marie-Marguerite Dufay
- Preceded by: Marie-Marguerite Dufay

Regional Councillor from Doubs
- Incumbent
- Assumed office 2004
- In office 1986–1997

Mayor of Maîche
- Incumbent
- Assumed office 1995

Member of French National Assembly for Doubs's 3rd constituency
- In office 12 June 1997 – 18 June 2002
- Preceded by: Monique Rousseau
- Succeeded by: Marcel Bonnot

Personal details
- Born: 16 May 1941 (age 85) Trévillers, France
- Party: Socialist Party

Joseph Parrenin (born 16 May 1941 in Trévillers, France) is the incumbent first Vice-President of the Franche-Comté Regional Council.

In 2002, he sought re-election as a National Assembly deputy for Doubs's 3rd constituency but he was defeated by UMP Marcel Bonnot. In 2007, Parrenin was again defeated by Bonnot.
