= Marcel Bonnot =

French politician

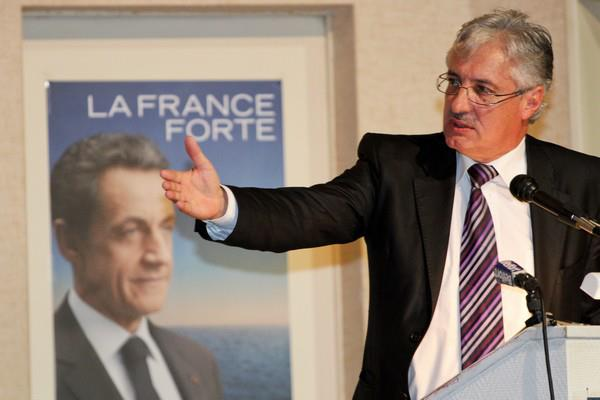
- image of Marcel Bonnot, was a French politician.

Member of French National Assembly for Doubs's 3rd constituency
- In office 16 June 2002 – 2017
- Preceded by: Joseph Parrenin
- Succeeded by: Denis Sommer

Personal details
- Born: 24 May 1946 (age 80) Rémondans-Vaivre, France
- Party: UMP

Marcel Bonnot (French: [maʁsɛl bɔno]; born 24 May 1946 in Rémondans-Vaivre) was a member of the National Assembly of France. He represented Doubs's 3rd constituency from 2002 to 2017 as a member of the Union for a Popular Movement.
