= Peugeot Type 58 =

French motor car (1904)

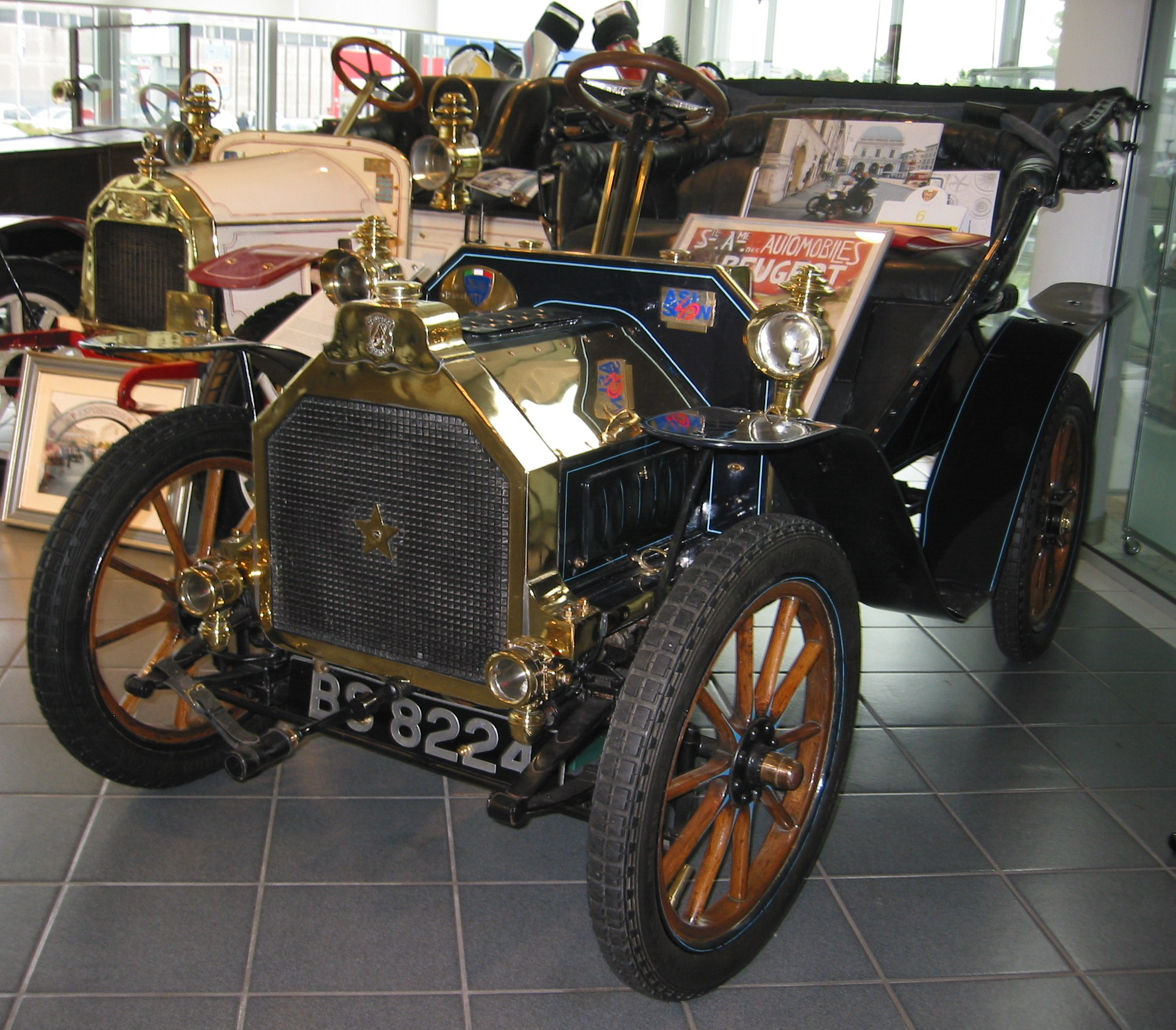

Overview
- Manufacturer: Peugeot
- Production: 1904

Body and chassis
- Class: mid-sized car
- Layout: FR layout

Dimensions
- Wheelbase: 1,900 mm (74.8 in)

Chronology
- Predecessor: Peugeot Type 56

The Peugeot Type 58 is an early motor car produced by the French auto-maker Peugeot at their Audincourt plant in 1904. Despite being in production for only a year, 121 were produced.

The Type 58 replaced the company's successful Type 56 model, and carried over most of the mechanical components from its predecessor, but the Type 58 was 150 mm (6 inches) longer than the Type 56.

The Type 58 was propelled using a single cylinder 833 cc four stroke engine, mounted ahead of the driver. A maximum of between 6 and 7 hp (5 kW) of power was delivered to the rear wheels by means of a rotating drive-shaft.

The car sat on a 1,900 mm (74.8 in) wheelbase. The open carriage Tonneau format body offered space for four.

== Sources and further reading ==
- Wolfgang Schmarbeck: Alle Peugeot Automobile 1890-1990. Motorbuch-Verlag. Stuttgart 1990. ISBN 3-613-01351-7
