= Doubs's 3rd constituency =

Constituency of the National Assembly of France

3rd constituency of Doubs
- inline Constituency of the National Assembly of France

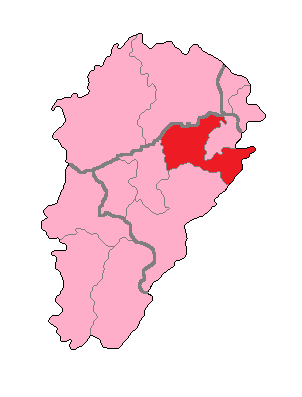
- The constituency shown within Franche-Comté
- Incumbent deputy: Matthieu Bloch; LR (UXD)
- Department: Doubs
- Cantons: Baume-les-Dames, Clerval, L'Isle-sur-le-Doubs, Maîche, Montbéliard-Est, Montbéliard-Ouest, Rougemont, Saint-Hippolyte
- Registered voters: 65,923 (2017)

The 3rd constituency of Doubs (French: Troisième circonscription du Doubs) is one of five electoral districts in the department of the same name, each of which returns one deputy to the French National Assembly in elections using the two-round system, with a run-off if no candidate receives more than 50% of the vote in the first round.

== Description ==
The constituency is made up of the eight former cantons of Baume-les-Dames, Clerval, L'Isle-sur-le-Doubs, Maîche, Montbéliard-Est, Montbéliard-Ouest, Rougemont, and Saint-Hippolyte.

It includes the town of Montbéliard and nearly surrounds the department's 4th constituency. In the east it reaches deep into the Jura Mountains, where it is bordered by Switzerland.

At the time of the 1999 census (which was the basis for the most recent redrawing of constituency boundaries, carried out in 2010) the 3rd constituency had a total population of 93,407.

The seat has generally been held by conservative parties except on the occasions of the Socialist landslides in the 1988 and 1997.

== Historic representation ==
Election	Member	Party
1973	Edgar Faure	DVD
1978	Roland Vuillaume	RPR
1986	Proportional representation – no election by constituency	
1988	Guy Bêche	PS
1993	Monique Rousseau	RPR
1997	Joseph Parrenin	PS
2002	Marcel Bonnot	UMP
2007	Marcel Bonnot	UMP
2012	Marcel Bonnot	UMP
2017	Denis Sommer	LREM
2022	Nicolas Pacquot	LREM
2024	Matthieu Bloch	UXD

== Election results ==
=== 2024 ===
Candidate	Party	Alliance	First round			Second round		
Candidate	Party	Alliance	Votes	%	+/–	Votes	%	+/–
Matthieu Bloch	LR-RN	UXD	18,795	44.35	new	21,543	50.76	new
Nicolas Pacquot	REN	Ensemble	12,806	30.22	+7.41	20,901	49.24	-1.59
Virginie Dayet	PCF	NFP	9,138	21.56	+1.11	withdrew		
Brandon Kemps	DSV		889	2.10	+0.60			
Franck Plain	LO		753	1.78	+0.27			
Votes			42,381	100.00		42,444	100.00	
Valid votes			42,381	95.84	-1.22	42,444	94.89	+3.98
Blank votes			1,149	2.60	+0.39	1,691	3.78	-3.01
Null votes			692	1.56	+0.83	596	1.33	-0.97
Turnout			44,222	68.30	+19.86	44,731	69.08	+22.95
Abstentions			20,526	31.70	-19.86	20,020	30.92	-22.95
Registered voters			64,748			64,751		
Result			UXD GAIN FROM RE					

=== 2022 ===
Legislative Election 2022: Doubs's 3rd constituency
Party	Candidate	Votes	%	±%
RN	Nathalie Fritsch	7,819	25.78	+5.77
LREM (Ensemble)	Nicolas Pacquot	6,919	22.81	-11.02
PCF (NUPÉS)	Virginie Dayet	6,202	20.45	+2.66
LR	Valère Nedey*	4,223	13.92	N/A
LR (UDC)	Christophe Froppier	2,506	8.26	−16.79
REC	Romane Taponnot	1,091	3.60	N/A
LMR	Christine Pastor	656	2.16	N/A
Others	N/A	915	-	−
Turnout		30,331	48.44	−0.95
2nd round result
LREM (Ensemble)	Nicolas Pacquot	13,754	50.83	+0.02
RN	Nathalie Fritsch	13,303	49.17	N/A
Turnout		17,057	46.13	+2.11
LREM hold				

* Nadey stood as a dissident LR member without the support of the party or the UDC alliance.

=== 2017 ===
Candidate	Label	First round		Second round	
Candidate	Label	Votes	%	Votes	%
Denis Sommer	REM	10,737	33.83	12,943	50.81
Frédéric Cartier	LR	7,950	25.05	12,530	49.19
Loup Viallet	FN	6,350	20.01		
Christophe Espolio	FI	2,900	9.14		
Sidonie Marchal	PS	1,899	5.98		
Odile Joannès	ECO	848	2.67		
Bruno Patois	ECO	413	1.30		
Christian Driano	EXG	392	1.23		
Karine Comas	DIV	253	0.80		
Votes		31,742	100.00	25,473	100.00
Valid votes		31,742	97.49	25,473	87.79
Blank votes		576	1.77	2,477	8.54
Null votes		242	0.74	1,067	3.68
Turnout		32,560	49.39	29,017	44.02
Abstentions		33,366	50.61	36,906	55.98
Registered voters		65,926		65,923	
Source: Ministry of the Interior

=== 2012 ===
2012 legislative election in Doubs's 3rd constituency
Candidate	Party	First round		Second round	
Candidate	Party	Votes	%	Votes	%
Marcel Bonnot	UMP	14,002	35.99%	19,270	51.00%
Arnaud Marthey	PS	13,312	34.22%	18,511	49.00%
Roland Boillot	FN	7,154	18.39%		
Lionel Maniere	FG	1,961	5.04%		
Tassadit Taharount	EELV	719	1.85%		
Catherine Comte-Deleuze	MoDem	578	1.49%		
Christian Driano	LO	406	1.04%		
Vladimir Djordjevic	MRC	329	0.85%		
Chantal Attal	AEI	319	0.82%		
Zakaria Beyrouthy		122	0.31%		
Valid votes		38,902	98.05%	37,781	96.01%
Spoilt and null votes		773	1.95%	1,569	3.99%
Votes cast / turnout		39,675	60.60%	39,350	60.15%
Abstentions		25,794	39.40%	26,071	39.85%
Registered voters		65,469	100.00%	65,421	100.00%

=== 2007 ===
Legislative Election 2007: Doubs's 3rd constituency
Party	Candidate	Votes	%	±%
UMP	Marcel Bonnot	18,069	45.32	
PS	Joseph Parrenin	11,838	29.69	
FN	Martine Faivre-Pierret	2,240	5.62	
MoDem	Laurent Bourquin	2,090	5.24	
LV	Bernard Lachambre	1,250	3.14	
DVD	Alain Merle	1,122	2.81	
Others	N/A	3,262	-	−
Turnout		40,648	61.45	
2nd round result
UMP	Marcel Bonnot	21,303	53.85	
PS	Joseph Parrenin	18,260	46.15	
Turnout		40,906	61.85	
UMP hold				

=== 2002 ===
Legislative Election 2002: Doubs's 3rd constituency
Party	Candidate	Votes	%	±%
UMP	Marcel Bonnot	15,722	37.87	
PS	Joseph Parrenin	14,150	34.08	
FN	Evelyne Carrez	5,871	14.14	
MNR	Mickaël Grisot	857	2.06	
Others	N/A	5,777	-	−
Turnout		42,677	66.31	
2nd round result
UMP	Marcel Bonnot	20,067	51.50	
PS	Joseph Parrenin	18,901	48.50	
Turnout		40,878	63.52	
UMP gain from PS				

=== 1997 ===
Legislative Election 1997: Doubs's 3rd constituency
Party	Candidate	Votes	%	±%
RPR	Monique Rousseau	13,866	32.51	
PS	Joseph Parrenin	12,646	29.65	
FN	Léon Colino	6,630	15.55	
LV	Françoise Touzot	2,126	4.99	
PCF	Olivier Del Rizzo	2,057	4.82	
LO	Christian Driano	1,481	3.47	
LDI	Thierry Choffat	1,308	3.07	
EXG	Denis Sommer	1,166	2.73	
GE	Yves Vola	770	1.81	
DVE	Jean-Marie Pietoukhoff	597	1.40	
Turnout		45,088	71.38	
2nd round result
PS	Joseph Parrenin	23,842	52.91	
RPR	Monique Rousseau	21,219	47.09	
Turnout		48,004	76.01	
PS gain from RPR				

== Sources ==
Official results of French elections from 2002: "Résultats électoraux officiels en France" (in French).
