= Peugeot Type 118 =

Overview
- Manufacturer: Peugeot
- Production: 1909

Body and chassis
- Class: small family car
- Layout: FR layout

Dimensions
- Wheelbase: 2,455 mm (96.7 in)

Chronology
- Predecessor: Peugeot Type 108

The Peugeot Type 118 is a motor car produced by the French auto-maker Peugeot at their Audincourt plant in 1909. 150 were produced.

The car shared with its 1908 predecessor, the Peugeot Type 108, a front-mounted twin-cylinder engine of 1,527 cc delivering a maximum of 10 hp to the rear wheels by means of a rotating steel drive shaft.

The 2,455 mm wheelbase, very slightly shorter than that of the Type 108, supported body formats which included a “Droschke” with space for four.

== Sources and further reading ==
- Wolfgang Schmarbeck: Alle Peugeot Automobile 1890-1990. Motorbuch-Verlag. Stuttgart 1990. ISBN 3-613-01351-7
