= Vandoncourt =

- Commune
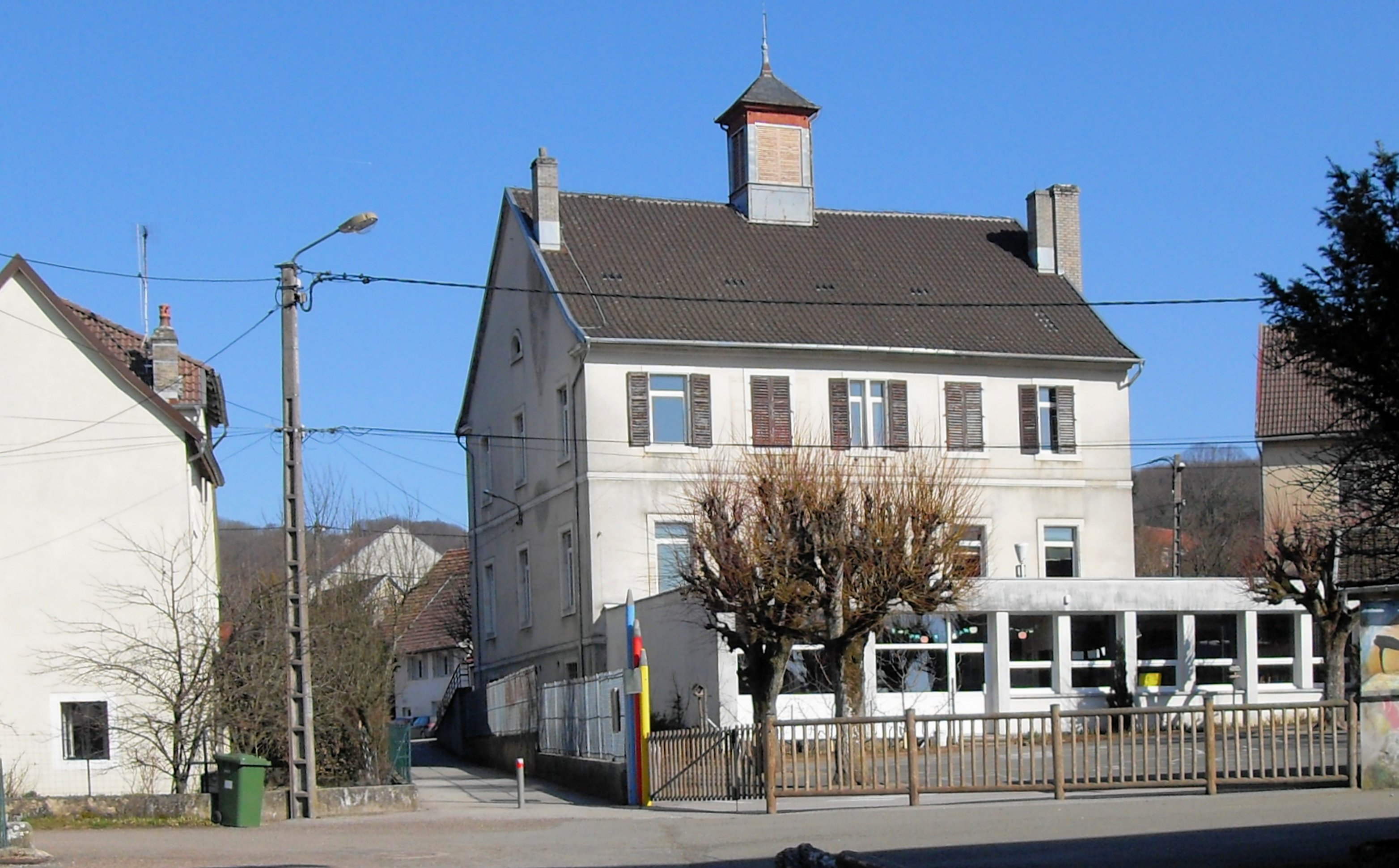
- Town hall and school

- Coat of arms
- Location of Vandoncourt
- Location within France Location within Bourgogne-Franche-Comté
- Coordinates: 47°28′04″N 6°54′07″E
- Country: France
- Region: Bourgogne-Franche-Comté
- Department: Doubs
- Arrondissement: Montbéliard
- Canton: Audincourt
- Intercommunality: Pays de Montbéliard Agglomération

Government
  - Mayor (2023–2026): Dominique Bouveresse
- Area^{1}: 8.57 km^{2} (3.31 sq mi)
- Highest elevation: 611 m (2,005 ft)
- Lowest elevation: 370 m (1,210 ft)
- Population (2023): 788
  - Density: 91.9/km^{2} (238/sq mi)
- Time zone: UTC+01:00 (CET)
  - Summer (DST): UTC+02:00 (CEST)
- INSEE/Postal code: 25586 /25230
- ^{1} French Land Register data, which excludes lakes, ponds, glaciers > 1 km^{2} (0.386 sq mi or 247 acres) and river estuaries.

Vandoncourt (French pronunciation: [vɑ̃dɔ̃kuʁ]) is a commune in the Doubs department in the Bourgogne-Franche-Comté region in eastern France.

== Geography ==
Vandoncourt lies 4.5 km (2.8 mi) southeast of Hérimoncourt and 7 km (4.3 mi) from the Swiss border. It occupies a transitional position between the Vosges Mountains and Alsace to the north, the Jura Mountains on the south, Switzerland on the east, and the plain of the river Saône on the west.

It is perched on a high plateau, which dominates the region.

== Population ==
Historical population
Year	Pop.	±% p.a.
1968	557	—
1975	605	+1.19%
1982	594	−0.26%
1990	605	+0.23%
1999	626	+0.38%
2007	817	+3.38%
2012	841	+0.58%
2017	830	−0.26%
2023	788	−0.86%
Source: INSEE

== See also ==
- Communes of the Doubs department
