= Taillecourt =

- Commune
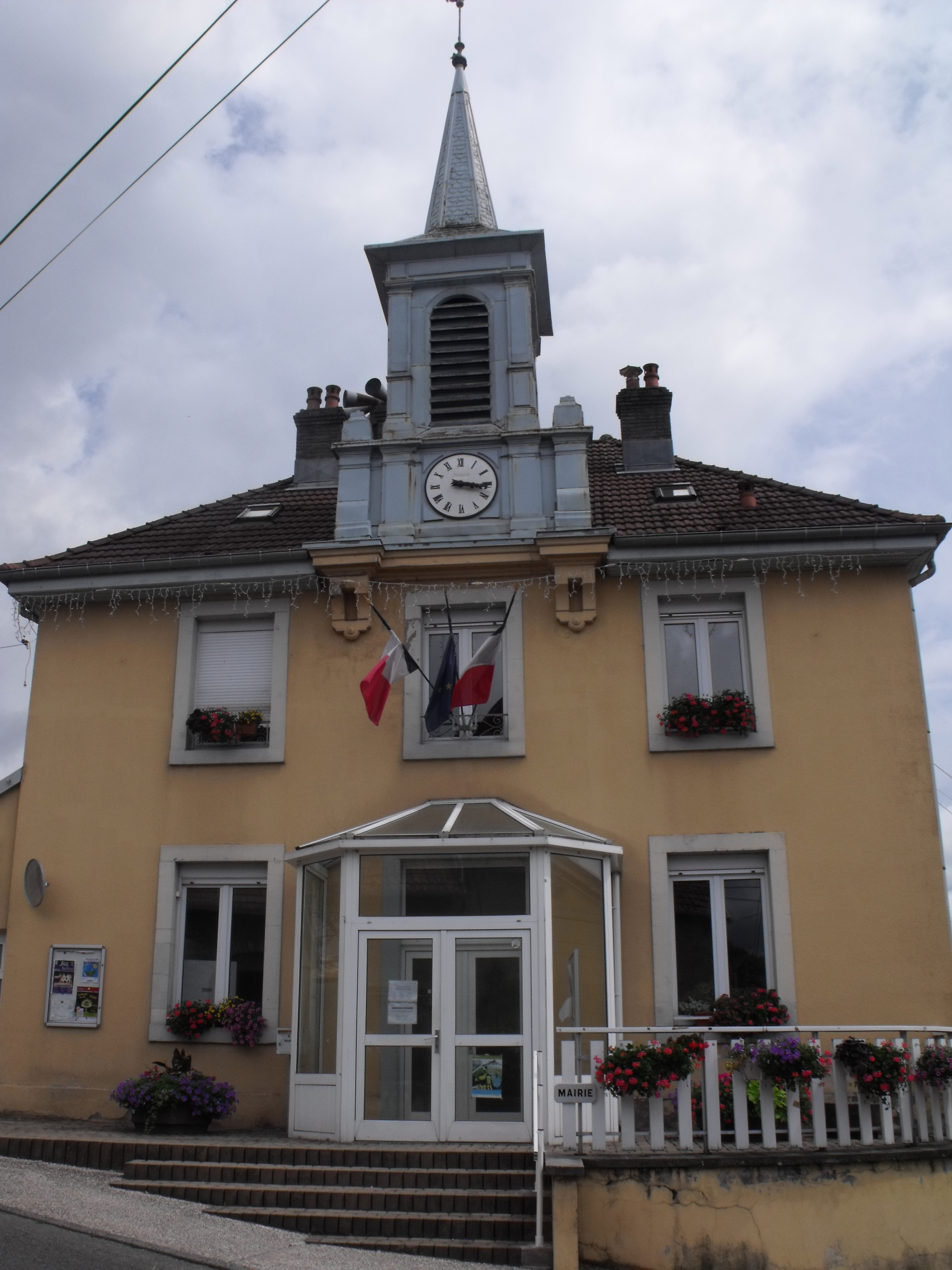
- The town hall in Taillecourt

- Coat of arms
- Location of Taillecourt
- Location within France Location within Bourgogne-Franche-Comté
- Coordinates: 47°29′51″N 6°50′57″E
- Country: France
- Region: Bourgogne-Franche-Comté
- Department: Doubs
- Arrondissement: Montbéliard
- Canton: Audincourt
- Intercommunality: Pays de Montbéliard Agglomération

Government
  - Mayor (2020–2026): Didier Klein
- Area^{1}: 1.86 km^{2} (0.72 sq mi)
- Highest elevation: 391 m (1,283 ft)
- Lowest elevation: 322 m (1,056 ft)
- Population (2023): 1,144
  - Density: 615/km^{2} (1,590/sq mi)
- Time zone: UTC+01:00 (CET)
  - Summer (DST): UTC+02:00 (CEST)
- INSEE/Postal code: 25555 /25400
- ^{1} French Land Register data, which excludes lakes, ponds, glaciers > 1 km^{2} (0.386 sq mi or 247 acres) and river estuaries.

Taillecourt (French pronunciation: [tajkuʁ]) is a commune in the Doubs department in the Bourgogne-Franche-Comté region in eastern France.

== Geography ==
Taillecourt lies 2.5 km (1.6 mi) south of Montbéliard and 1 km (0.62 mi) north of Audincourt on national highway 437.

== Population ==
Historical population
Year	Pop.	±% p.a.
1968	505	—
1975	679	+4.32%
1982	745	+1.33%
1990	659	−1.52%
1999	743	+1.34%
2007	1,042	+4.32%
2012	1,044	+0.04%
2017	1,104	+1.12%
2023	1,144	+0.59%
Source: INSEE

== See also ==
- Communes of the Doubs department
