= Badevel =

- Commune
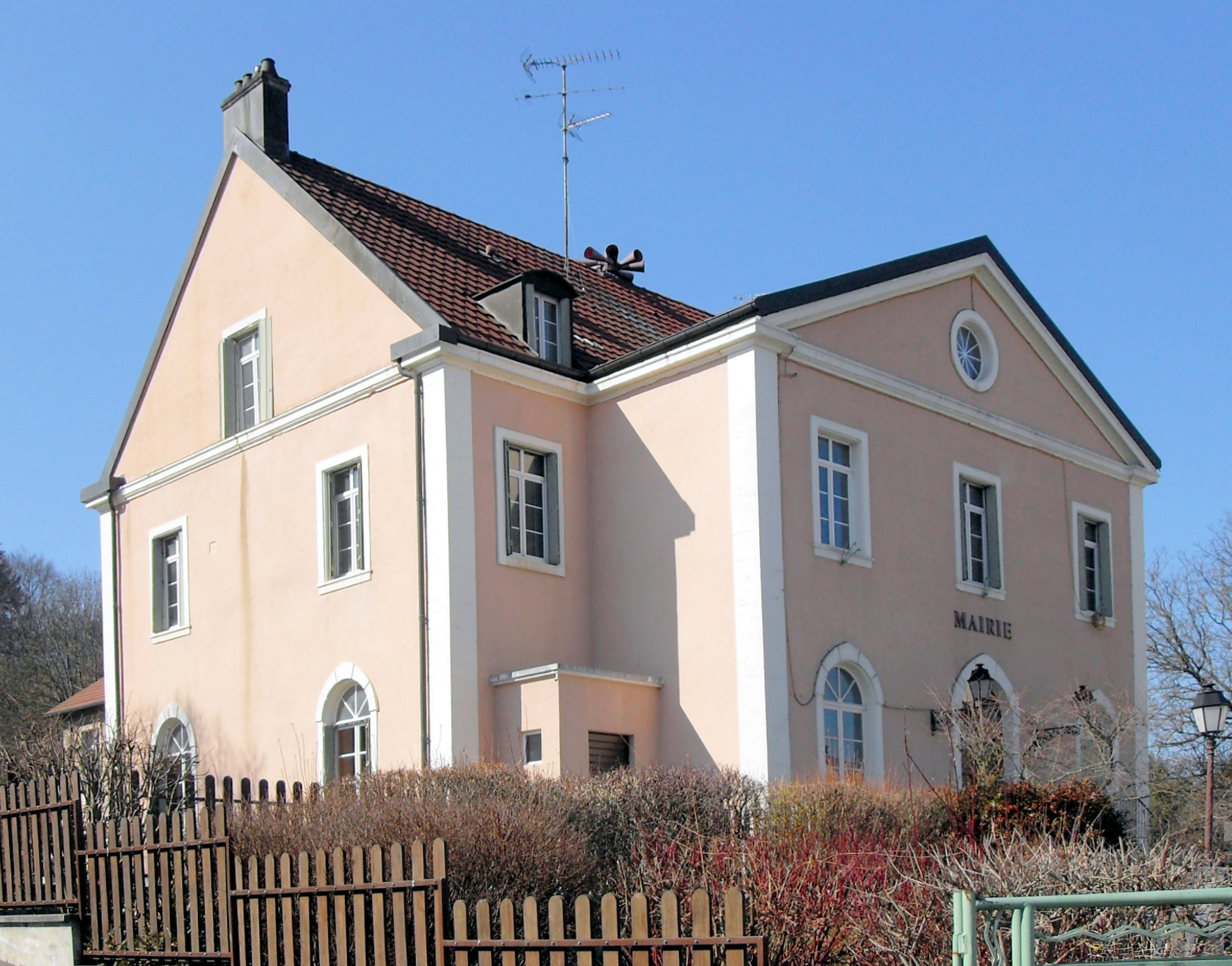
- The town hall in Badevel

- Coat of arms
- Location of Badevel
- Location within France Location within Bourgogne-Franche-Comté
- Coordinates: 47°30′01″N 6°56′25″E
- Country: France
- Region: Bourgogne-Franche-Comté
- Department: Doubs
- Arrondissement: Montbéliard
- Canton: Audincourt
- Intercommunality: Pays de Montbéliard Agglomération

Government
  - Mayor (2020–2026): Samuel Gomes
- Area^{1}: 3.73 km^{2} (1.44 sq mi)
- Highest elevation: 452 m (1,483 ft)
- Lowest elevation: 345 m (1,132 ft)
- Population (2023): 808
  - Density: 217/km^{2} (561/sq mi)
- Time zone: UTC+01:00 (CET)
  - Summer (DST): UTC+02:00 (CEST)
- INSEE/Postal code: 25040 /25490
- ^{1} French Land Register data, which excludes lakes, ponds, glaciers > 1 km^{2} (0.386 sq mi or 247 acres) and river estuaries.

Badevel (French pronunciation: [badvɛl]; Frainc-Comtou: Badwé) is a commune in the Doubs department in the Bourgogne-Franche-Comté region in eastern France.

== Population ==
Historical population
Year	Pop.	±% p.a.
1968	881	—
1975	828	−0.88%
1982	744	−1.52%
1990	723	−0.36%
1999	732	+0.14%
2007	879	+2.31%
2012	855	−0.55%
2017	817	−0.91%
2023	808	−0.18%
Source: INSEE

== See also ==
- Communes of the Doubs department
