= Frédéric Barbier (politician) =

French politician

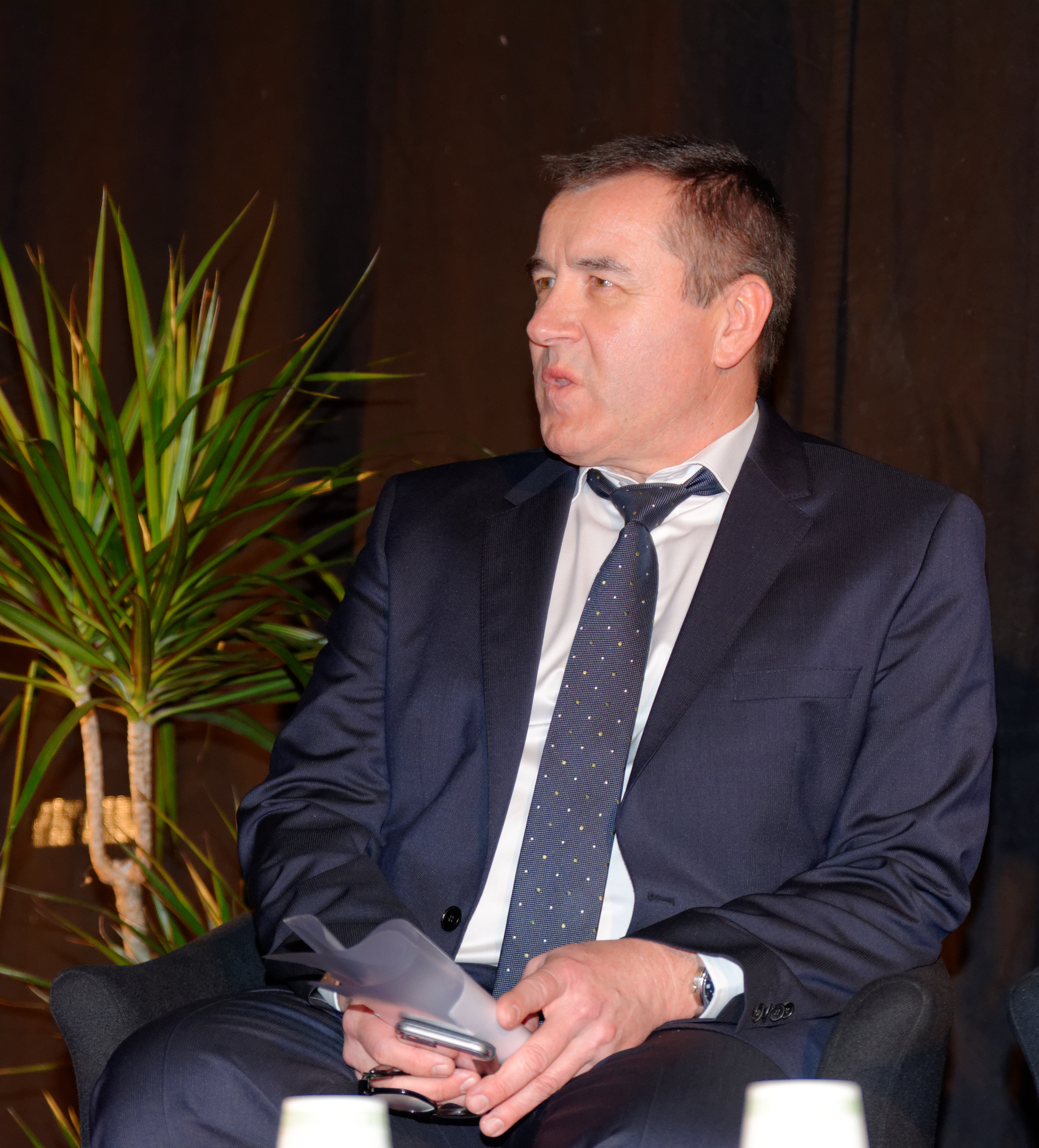

Member of the National Assembly for Doubs's 4th constituency
- In office 2015 – 22 June 2022
- Preceded by: Pierre Moscovici
- Succeeded by: Géraldine Grangier

Personal details
- Born: 30 August 1960 (age 65) Audincourt, France
- Party: Socialist (2015-2017); La République En Marche! (2017 onwards); Territories of Progress (2020 onwards)

Frédéric Barbier (born 30 August 1960) is a French politician of La République En Marche! (LREM) and of Territories of Progress (TDP) who was a member of the French National Assembly from 2015 to 2022, representing the department of Doubs.

== Political career ==
Having previously been affiliated with the Socialist Party, Barbier joined LREM in 2016. In 2020, he joined Territories of Progress.

In parliament, Barbier serves as member of the Committee on Foreign Affairs. In addition to his committee assignments, he is a member of the French-German Parliamentary Friendship Group.

== Political positions ==
In October 2017, Barbier was the only LREM member to vote against the reform of the solidarity tax on wealth (ISF) and against the increase in the general social contribution (CSG) for pensioners.

In July 2019, Barbier decided not to align with his parliamentary group’s majority and became one of 52 LREM members who abstained from a vote on the French ratification of the European Union’s Comprehensive Economic and Trade Agreement (CETA) with Canada.

== See also ==
- 2017 French legislative election
