= Canton of Audincourt =

Coordinates: 47.48°N 6.84°E

The canton of Audincourt is an administrative division of the Doubs department, eastern France. Its borders were modified at the French canton reorganisation which came into effect in March 2015. Its seat is in Audincourt.

It consists of the following communes:

1. Arbouans
2. Audincourt
3. Badevel
4. Dampierre-les-Bois
5. Dasle
6. Hérimoncourt
7. Seloncourt
8. Taillecourt
9. Vandoncourt
