= Dasle =

- Commune
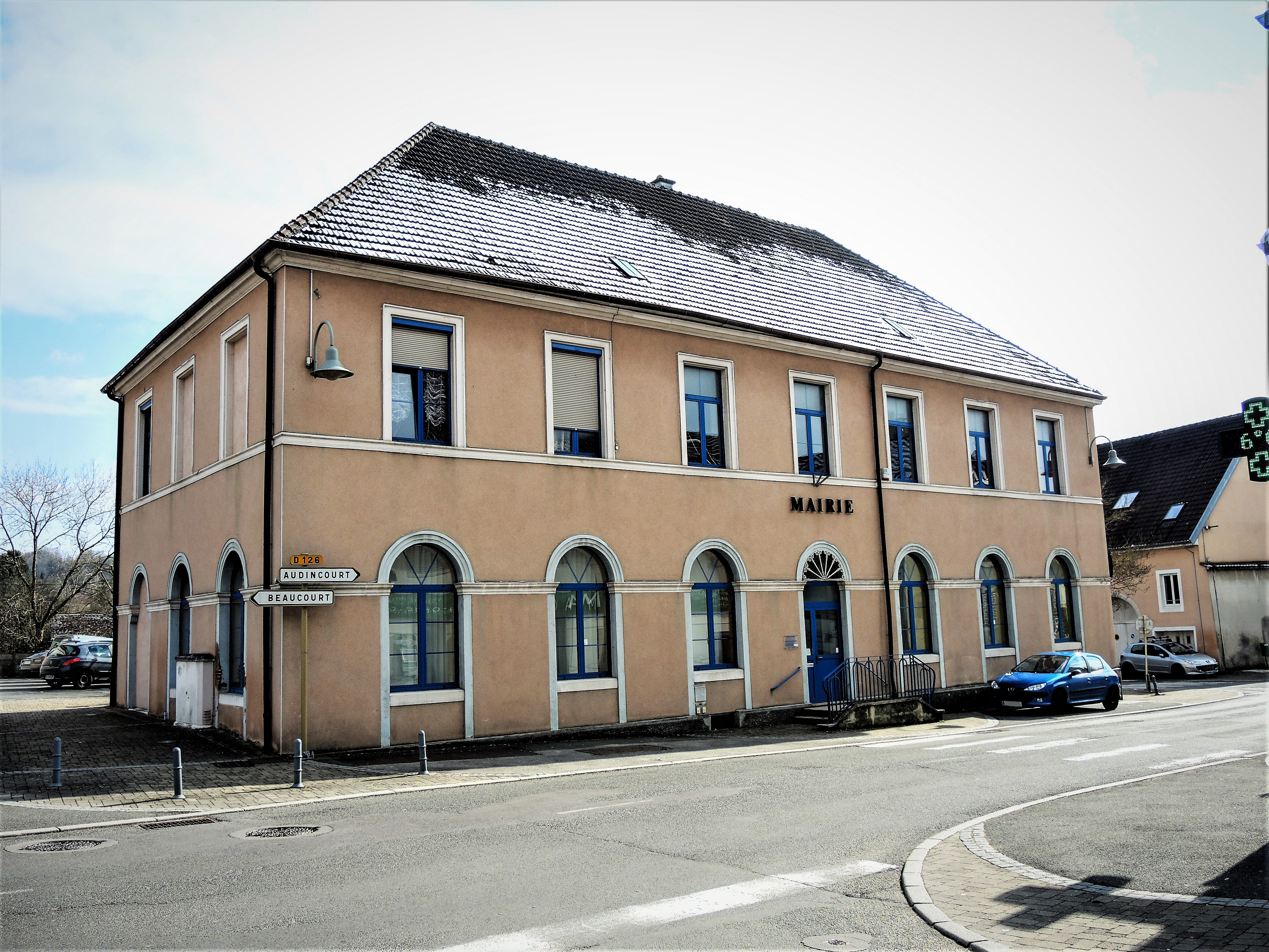
- Town hall
- Location of Dasle
- Location within France Location within Bourgogne-Franche-Comté
- Coordinates: 47°28′43″N 6°53′42″E
- Country: France
- Region: Bourgogne-Franche-Comté
- Department: Doubs
- Arrondissement: Montbéliard
- Canton: Audincourt
- Intercommunality: Pays de Montbéliard Agglomération

Government
  - Mayor (2020–2026): Carole Thouesny
- Area^{1}: 5.67 km^{2} (2.19 sq mi)
- Highest elevation: 461 m (1,512 ft)
- Lowest elevation: 360 m (1,180 ft)
- Population (2023): 1,363
  - Density: 240/km^{2} (623/sq mi)
- Time zone: UTC+01:00 (CET)
  - Summer (DST): UTC+02:00 (CEST)
- INSEE/Postal code: 25196 /25230
- ^{1} French Land Register data, which excludes lakes, ponds, glaciers > 1 km^{2} (0.386 sq mi or 247 acres) and river estuaries.

Dasle (French pronunciation: [dal]) is a commune in the Doubs department in the Bourgogne-Franche-Comté region in eastern France.

== Population ==
Historical population
Year	Pop.	±% p.a.
1968	1,357	—
1975	1,345	−0.13%
1982	1,439	+0.97%
1990	1,418	−0.18%
1999	1,343	−0.60%
2007	1,345	+0.02%
2012	1,425	+1.16%
2017	1,417	−0.11%
2023	1,363	−0.65%
Source: INSEE

== See also ==
- Communes of the Doubs department
