= Denis Sommer =

French politician

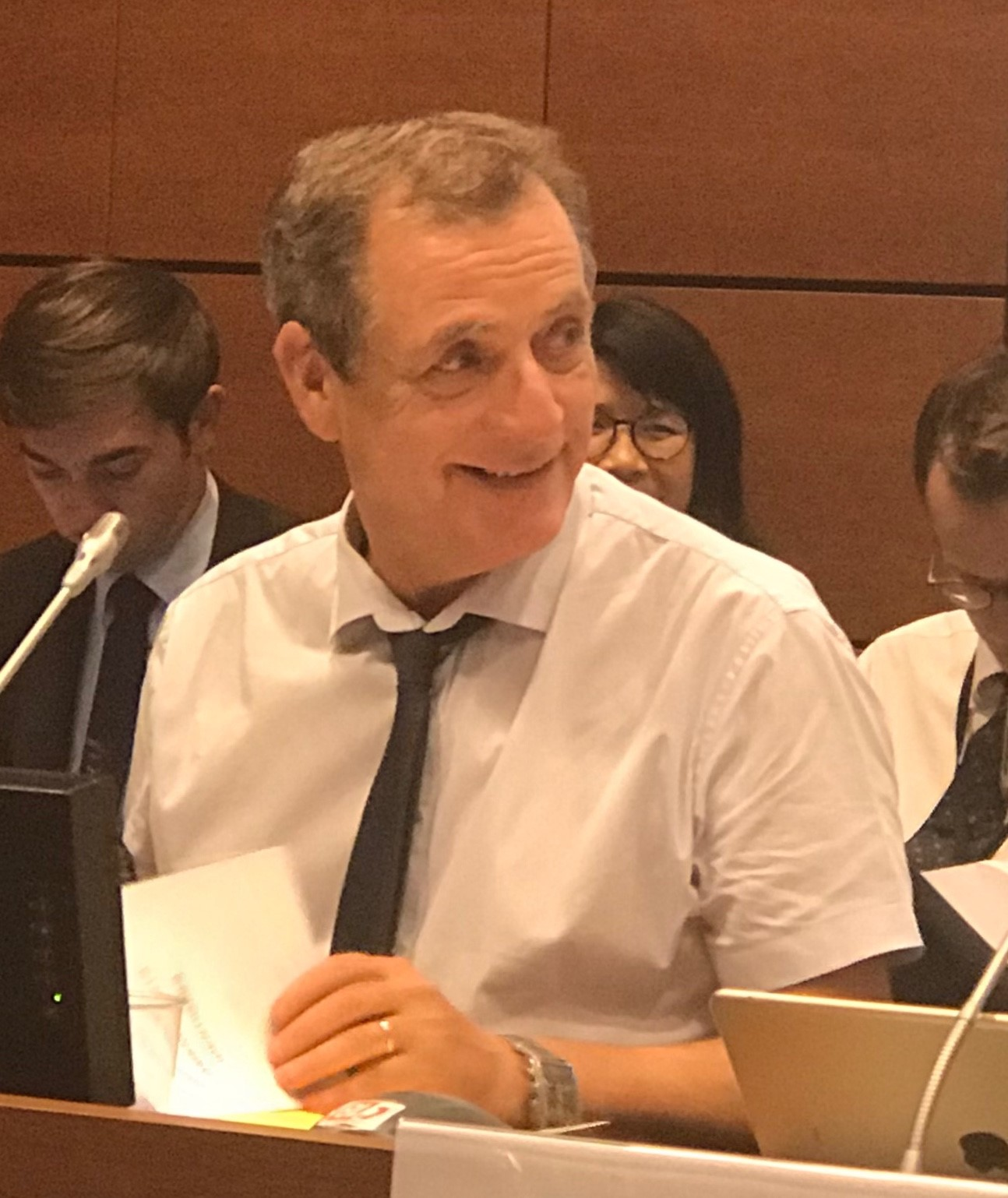

Member of the National Assembly for Doubs's 3rd constituency
- In office 21 June 2017 – 2022
- Preceded by: Marcel Bonnot
- Succeeded by: Nicolas Pacquot

Personal details
- Born: 23 September 1957 (age 68) Lure, Haute-Saône, France
- Party: La République En Marche! Territories of Progress

Denis Sommer (born 23 September 1957) is a French politician of La République En Marche! (LREM) and Territories of Progress (TDP) who served as a member of the French National Assembly from 2017 to 2022, representing the department of Doubs.

== Political career ==
Sommer was initially a member of the French Communist Party (PCF) and later of the Socialist Party (PS). He joined La République En Marche! (LREM) in 2017 and Territories of Progress (TDP) in 2020. In parliament, Sommer served as member of the Committee on Economic Affairs. In addition to his committee assignments, he was a member of the French Parliamentary Friendship Group with Bosnia-Herzegovina.

== Political positions ==
In July 2019, Sommer decided not to align with his parliamentary group's majority and became one of 52 LREM members who abstained from a vote on the French ratification of the European Union’s Comprehensive Economic and Trade Agreement (CETA) with Canada.

== See also ==
- 2017 French legislative election
