= Dampierre-les-Bois =

- Commune
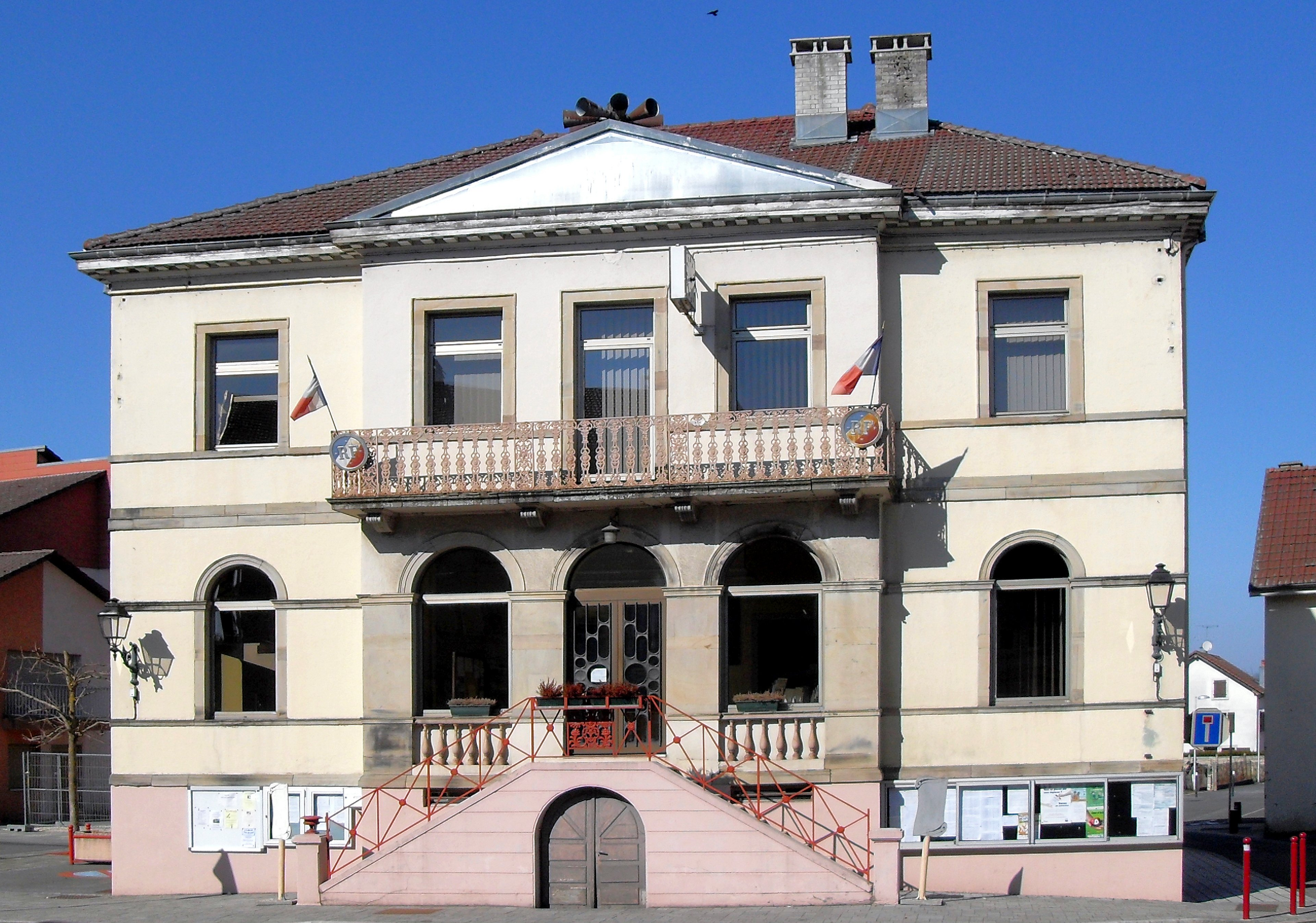
- The town hall in Dampierre-les-Bois

- Coat of arms
- Location of Dampierre-les-Bois
- Location within France Location within Bourgogne-Franche-Comté
- Coordinates: 47°30′28″N 6°54′46″E
- Country: France
- Region: Bourgogne-Franche-Comté
- Department: Doubs
- Arrondissement: Montbéliard
- Canton: Audincourt
- Intercommunality: Pays de Montbéliard Agglomération

Government
  - Mayor (2020–2026): Marc Tirole
- Area^{1}: 4.72 km^{2} (1.82 sq mi)
- Highest elevation: 420 m (1,380 ft)
- Lowest elevation: 335 m (1,099 ft)
- Population (2023): 1,615
  - Density: 342/km^{2} (886/sq mi)
- Time zone: UTC+01:00 (CET)
  - Summer (DST): UTC+02:00 (CEST)
- INSEE/Postal code: 25190 /25490
- ^{1} French Land Register data, which excludes lakes, ponds, glaciers > 1 km^{2} (0.386 sq mi or 247 acres) and river estuaries.

Dampierre-les-Bois (French pronunciation: [dɑ̃pjɛʁ le bwa]) is a commune in the Doubs department in the Bourgogne-Franche-Comté region in eastern France.

== Population ==
Historical population
Year	Pop.	±% p.a.
1968	1,559	—
1975	1,581	+0.20%
1982	1,570	−0.10%
1990	1,510	−0.49%
1999	1,545	+0.25%
2007	1,551	+0.05%
2012	1,661	+1.38%
2017	1,635	−0.32%
2023	1,615	−0.20%
Source: INSEE

== See also ==
- Communes of the Doubs department
