= Peugeot Type 56 =

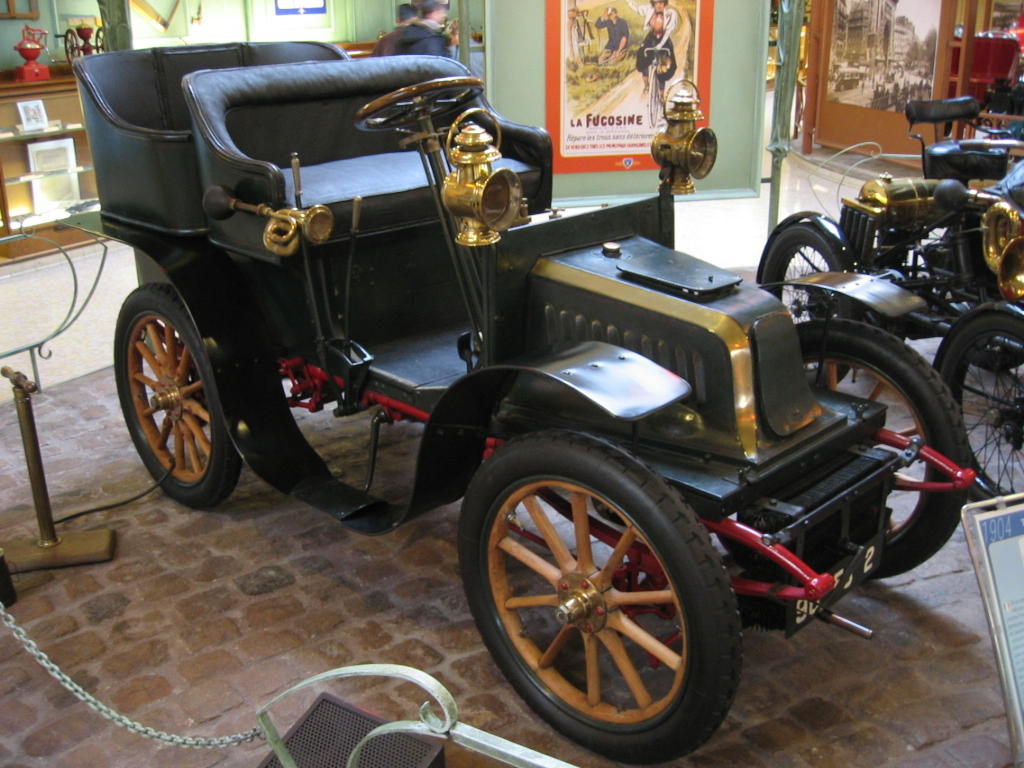

Overview
- Manufacturer: S. A. des Automobiles Peugeot
- Production: 1903; 16 produced

Body and chassis
- Body style: Tonneau
- Layout: FR layout

Powertrain
- Engine: 833 cc single-cylinder

Dimensions
- Wheelbase: 1.75 metres (69 in)
- Length: 2.80 metres (110 in)

Chronology
- Predecessor: Peugeot Type 25
- Successor: Peugeot Type 58

The Peugeot Type 56 was a model from Peugeot for 1903. It had the same, 833 cc single-cylinder engine as used in the related Types 48 and 58, and had two rows of seats and an open top. A total of 16 were built.

In 1904 (after the model had already been replaced) a Peugeot Type 56 gained official recognition for exceptional fuel economy when one of the cars traveled 100 kilometers using only 5.3 litres of fuel. Recognition was awarded in the form of a gold medal called la médaille d'or de la locomotion ("the Gold Medal of Locomotion").
