= Pierre Moscovici =

French politician (born 1957)

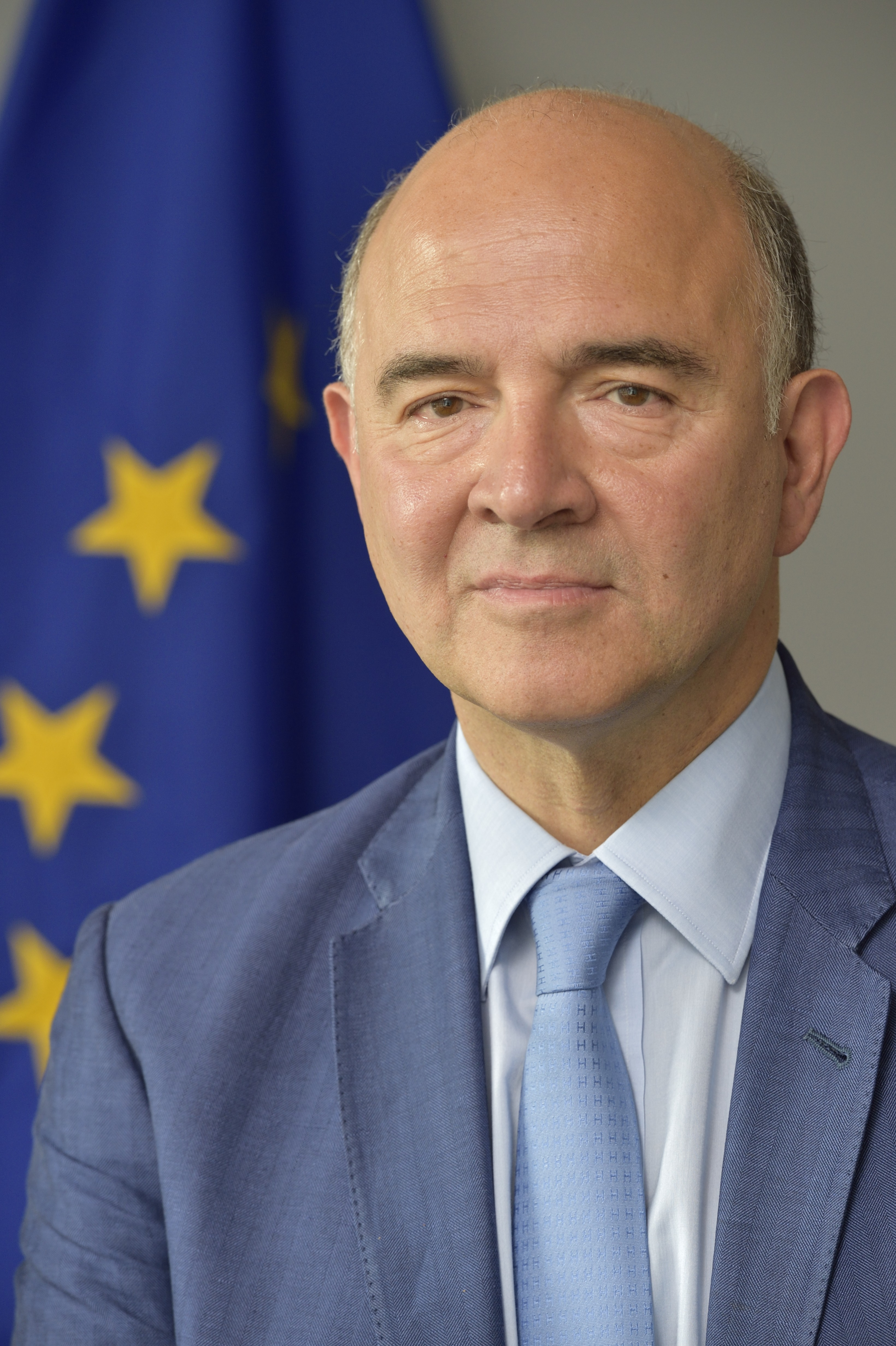
- Official portrait, 2014

Member of the European Court of Auditors for France
- Incumbent
- Assumed office 1 January 2026
- President: Tony Murphy
- Preceded by: François-Roger Cazala

First President of the Court of Audit
- In office 3 June 2020 – 31 December 2025
- President: Emmanuel Macron
- Preceded by: Didier Migaud

European Commissioner for Economic and Financial Affairs, Taxation and Customs
- In office 1 November 2014 – 30 November 2019
- Commission: Juncker
- Preceded by: Algirdas Šemeta
- Succeeded by: Paolo Gentiloni

Minister of Finance
- In office 16 May 2012 – 2 April 2014
- President: François Hollande
- Prime Minister: Jean-Marc Ayrault
- Preceded by: François Baroin
- Succeeded by: Michel Sapin

Member of the National Assembly for Doubs's 4th constituency
- In office 3 May 2014 – 31 October 2014
- Preceded by: Frédéric Barbier
- Succeeded by: Frédéric Barbier
- In office 20 June 2007 – 21 July 2012
- Preceded by: Irène Tharin
- Succeeded by: Frédéric Barbier
- In office 1 June 1997 – 4 July 1997
- Preceded by: Jean Geney
- Succeeded by: Joseph Tyrode

Personal details
- Born: 16 September 1957 (age 69) Paris, France
- Party: Socialist Party (until 2020)
- Spouse: Anne-Michelle Basteri (m. 2015)
- Children: 1
- Parent(s): Serge Moscovici; Marie Broomberg
- Education: Lycée Condorcet
- Alma mater: Sciences Po, ÉNA

Pierre Moscovici (French pronunciation: [pjɛʁ mɔskɔvisi], Romanian: [moskoˈvitʃʲ]; born 16 September 1957) is a French politician who served as the European Commissioner for Economic and Financial Affairs, Taxation and Customs from 2014 to 2019. He previously served as Minister of Finance from 2012 to 2014 and as Minister for European Affairs between 1997 and 2002.

Previously a member of the Trotskyist group the Revolutionary Communist League, Moscovici joined the French Socialist Party (PS) in 1984 and has since that time been a member of the Departmental Council of Doubs and of the French Parliament and the European Parliament.

In May 2014 he was entrusted by the Prime Minister of France with a six-month mission to assess how European policies can better contribute to growth and employment. In July 2014 French President François Hollande proposed him to be France's representative in the next European Commission. In September 2014, he was named as European Commissioner for Economic and Financial Affairs, Taxation and Customs by President-designate of the European Commission Jean-Claude Juncker.

== Early life and education ==
Born in Paris, Moscovici is the son of the influential Romanian Jewish social psychologist Serge Moscovici and of the Polish Jewish psychoanalyst Marie Bromberg-Moscovici.

Moscovici obtained his Baccalauréat at the Lycée Condorcet in 1974, a DEA in economics and in philosophy, and he graduated from Sciences Po Paris and the École nationale d'administration, where he studied under Dominique Strauss-Kahn, who became a friend and mentor in politics. He was a president of À gauche en Europe, a group founded by Strauss-Kahn and Michel Rocard and also created his own group "Besoin de Gauche".

After graduating from the École nationale d'administration in 1984, Moscovici was appointed to the Court of Audit, of which he is currently a senior member.

== Political career ==
=== Early political career ===
Initially active in the Revolutionary Communist League, he left in 1984 to join the PS and, in 1986, became secretary of the "experts' group" created by Claude Allègre.

In 1988, he moved on to the Ministry for National Education in Minister Lionel Jospin's cabinet, first as conseiller technique, then as chargé de mission.

From 1990 to 1994, he headed the Public Service Modernisation and Financing Department at the Commissariat général du Plan – French Planning Office.

=== Member of the European Parliament ===
From 1994 to 1997, Moscovici was a Member of the European Parliament. In parliament, he served on the Committee on Economic and Monetary Affairs. In addition to his committee assignments, he was part of the Parliament's delegation for relations with the countries of Central America and Mexico.

=== Minister delegate for European Affairs ===
Elected to the French Parliament from the Doubs département in 1997, he went on to become a Member of the Franche-Comté Regional Council from 1998 to 2004, and of the Doubs département General Council from 1994 to 2002.

From 1997 to 2002, Moscovici was Minister delegate for European Affairs in the government of Lionel Jospin. At the request of Chirac, he represented the French authorities at the Convention on the Future of Europe in 2002.

=== Member of the European Parliament ===
On 20 July 2004, Moscovici was elected one of the 14 Vice-presidents of the European Parliament and was re-elected on 17 January 2007. In addition, he served on the Committee on Foreign Affairs.

Of Romanian origin, he was one of the supporters of Romania's EU integration. He stated that he identifies itself as a half Romanian.

=== Member of the French National Assembly ===
From 2007 to 2012, Moscovici was a Member of the French National Assembly (4th constituency in the Doubs), serving on the Committee on Foreign Affairs, and subsequently the Finance Committee. He also served as vice-president of the Assembly's Committee on European Affairs.

He was President of the Pays de Montbéliard Agglomération (PMA – Greater Montbéliard Authority) from 2008 to 2012.

In 2011, Moscovici endorsed François Hollande and ran his successful campaign for the 2012 French presidential election. In the subsequent legislative election, Moscovici was re-elected to the National Assembly from the 4th constituency in the Doubs.

Moscovici served as a Member of the French National Assembly. In May 2014 he was entrusted by the Prime Minister of France with a six-month mission to assess how European policies can better contribute to growth and employment.

=== Minister for Finance and Economy ===
Moscovici served as France's Minister for Finance and Economy from May 2012 to April 2014.

Ahead of the Socialist Party's 2012 convention in Toulouse, Moscovici publicly endorsed Harlem Désir as candidate to succeed Martine Aubry at the party's leadership.

Moscovici was among the guests invited to the state dinner hosted by U.S. President Barack Obama in honor of Hollande at the White House on 11 February 2014.

== Commissioner for Economic and Financial Affairs, Taxation and Customs ==
In July 2014 President Francois Hollande nominated Moscovici to be France's candidate for the European Commission led by Jean-Claude Juncker. Juncker subsequently nominated Moscovici as Commissioner for Economic and Financial Affairs, Taxation and Customs.

Moscovici served as Commissioner from 2014 until 2019. In this capacity, he was in charge of the application of the Stability and Growth Pact, as well as ensuring the economic soundness of Commission proposals and deepening the Economic and Monetary Union of the European Union to create the conditions for jobs, growth and investment, and encouraging further structural reforms. On taxation matters, he was responsible for developing a value added tax system at the European level, improving the functioning of the internal market in both direct and indirect taxation and fighting tax fraud and tax evasion. His responsibilities also included the development and management of an efficient European Union Customs Union.

By 2017, Moscovici openly advocated a fully formed eurozone finance minister, and admitted that he would be interested in that position. In the meantime, the as Commissioner for Economic and Financial Affairs, Taxation and Customs should also assume the presidency of the Eurogroup.

In a 2018 letter to Sergei Stanishev, then chairman of the Party of European Socialists (PES), Moscovici ruled himself out of the race to succeed Jean-Claude Juncker and become the commission's next president, "due to profound disagreements with [the French Socialist Party’s] political line and strategy on Europe."

== Wiretapping by NSA ==
In 2015, WikiLeaks revealed that the U.S. National Security Agency wiretapped Moscovici's communication during his time as Minister of Finance.

== Other activities ==
- Paris School of International Affairs (PSIA), Member of the Strategic Committee

== Overview ==
=== Governmental function ===
- Minister of Economy and Finances, June 2012 – April 2014
- Minister of Economy, Finances, and Foreign Trade, May 2012 – June 2012
- Minister of European Affairs, 1997–2002.

=== Electoral mandates ===
==== European Parliament ====
- Member of European Parliament, 1994–1997 (elected in the National Assembly of France in 1997, and became minister) 2004–2007 (Resignation, re-elected member of the National Assembly of France in 2007). Elected in 1994, re-elected in 2004.

==== National Assembly of France ====
- Member of the National Assembly of France for Doubs, elected in 1997, but became minister in June) 2007–2012 (became minister in May). Elected in 1997, re-elected in 2007, 2012.

==== Regional Council ====
- Regional councillor of Franche-Comté, 1998–2004.

==== General Council ====
- General councillor of Doubs, 1994–2001.

==== Municipal Council ====
- Municipal councillor of Valentigney, 2008–2014.
- Municipal councillor of Montbéliard, 1995–2008. Re-elected in 2001.

==== Agglomeration community Council ====
- President of the Agglomeration community of the Pays de Montbéliard, 2008–2012 (resignation).
- Member of the Agglomeration community of the Pays de Montbéliard, 2008–2014.

== Opinion ==
"We sincerely hope that Greece remains in the Eurozone", Moscovici said.

== See also ==
- Ireland as a tax haven
- Double Irish arrangement

Political offices
Preceded by François Baroin	Minister of Economy and Finance; 2012–2014	Succeeded by Michel Sapin
Preceded by Michel Barnier	French European Commissioner; 2014–2019	Succeeded by Thierry Breton
Preceded by Jyrki Katainen as European Commissioner for Economic and Monetary Affairs and the Euro	European Commissioner for Economic and Financial Affairs, Taxation and Customs; 2014–2019	Succeeded by Paolo Gentiloni
Preceded by Algirdas Šemeta as European Commissioner for Taxation and Customs Union, Audit and Anti-Fraud	European Commissioner for Economic and Financial Affairs, Taxation and Customs; 2014–2019	Succeeded by Paolo Gentiloni
Legal offices
Preceded by Didier Migaud	First President of the Court of Audit; 2020–present	Incumbent
