= Irène Tharin =

French politician (1938–2016)

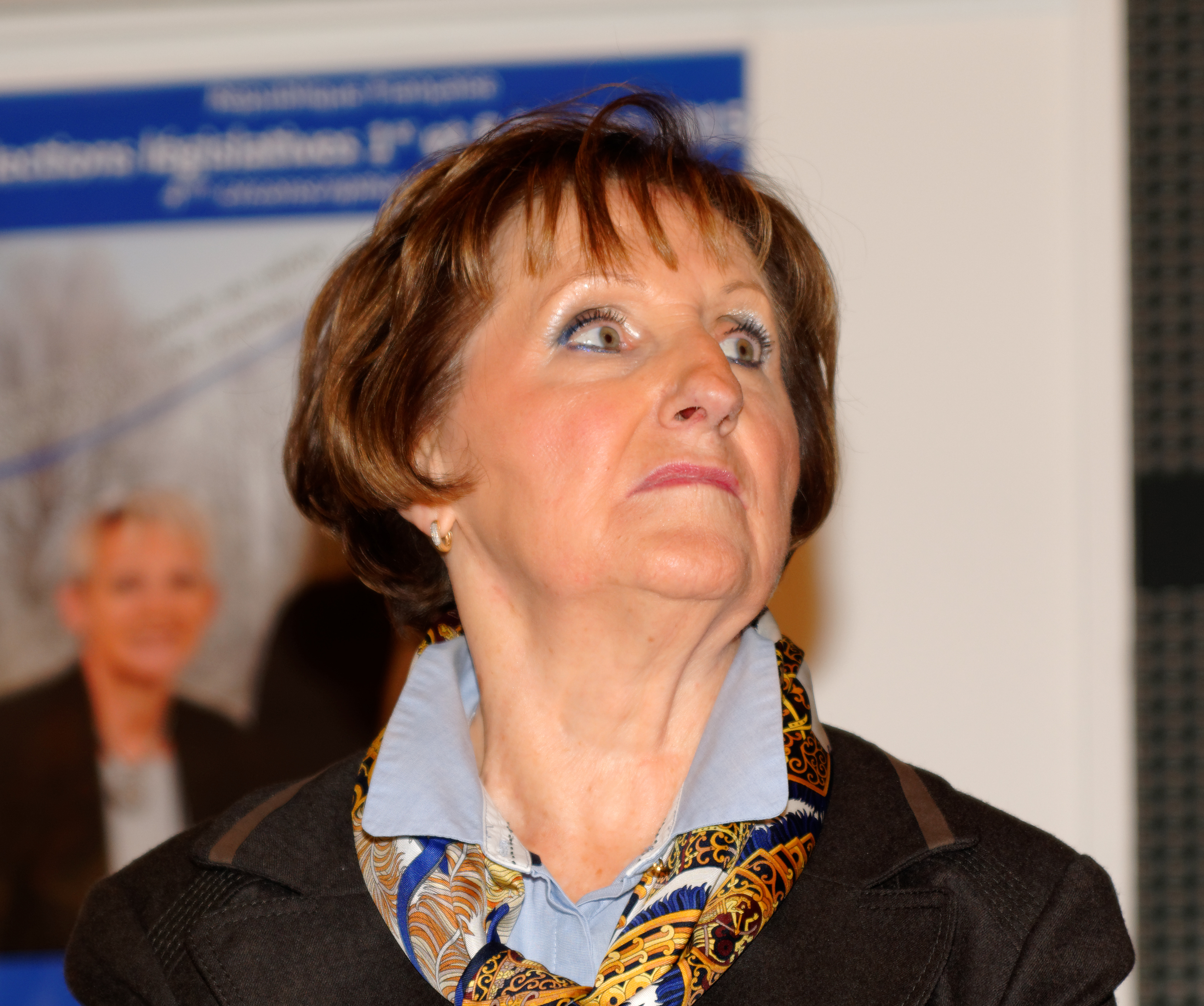
- Tharin in 2015.

Member of the National Assembly for Doubs's 4th constituency
- In office 19 June 2002 – 19 June 2007
- Preceded by: Joseph Tyrode
- Succeeded by: Pierre Moscovici

Personal details
- Born: 18 July 1938 Audincourt, France
- Died: 7 August 2016 (aged 78) Audincourt, France
- Party: UMP
- Relations: Annie Genevard (daughter)

Irène Tharin (18 July 1938 – 7 August 2016) was a French politician who served as Member of Parliament for Doubs's 4th constituency from 2002 to 2007.

She was Mayor of Seloncourt from 1993 to 2001.

== Personal life ==
Her daughter Annie Genevard is also a Member of Parliament in Doubs.
