= Doubs's 4th constituency =

Constituency of the National Assembly of France

4th constituency of Doubs
- inline Constituency of the National Assembly of France

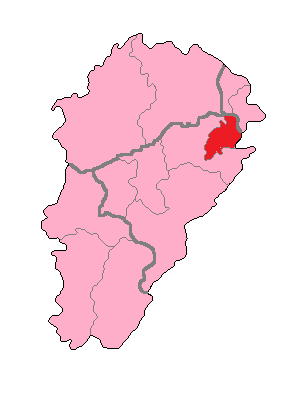
- The constituency shown within Franche-Comté
- Incumbent deputy: Géraldine Grangier; RN
- Department: Doubs
- Cantons: Audincourt, Étupes, Hérimoncourt, Pont-de-Roide, Sochaux-Grand-Charmont, Valentigney
- Registered voters: 66,862 (2017)

The 4th constituency of Doubs (French: Quatrième circonscription du Doubs) is one of five electoral districts in the department of the same name, each of which returns one deputy to the French National Assembly in elections using the two-round system, with a run-off if no candidate receives more than 50% of the vote in the first round.

== Description ==
The constituency is made up of the six former cantons of Audincourt, Étupes, Hérimoncourt, Pont-de-Roide, Sochaux-Grand-Charmont, and Valentigney.

It includes Audincourt and Valentigney, both of which are southern suburbs of Montbéliard, and extends into the Jura Mountains reaching as far as the border with Switzerland.

At the time of the 1999 census (which was the basis for the most recent redrawing of constituency boundaries, carried out in 2010) the 4th constituency had a total population of 96,933.

The seat swung between left and right for much of its history. In 2017, former PS deputy Frédéric Barbier gained the seat for Emmanuel Macron's centrist LREM party. Barbier lost the seat to Géraldine Grangier of the far-right RN party in 2022.

== Historic representation ==
Election	Member	Party
1986	Proportional representation – no election by constituency	
1988	Huguette Bouchardeau	DVG
1993	Jean Geney	RPR
1997	Pierre Moscovici	PS
1997	Joseph Tyrode	PS
2002	Irène Tharin	UMP
2007	Pierre Moscovici	PS
2012	Pierre Moscovici	PS
2012	Frédéric Barbier	PS
2014	Pierre Moscovici	PS
2015	Frédéric Barbier	PS
2017	Frédéric Barbier	LREM
2022	Géraldine Grangier	RN
2024	Géraldine Grangier	RN

== Election results ==
=== 2024 ===
Candidate	Party	Alliance	First round			Second round		
Candidate	Party	Alliance	Votes	%	+/–	Votes	%	+/–
Géraldine Grangier	RN		19,863	47.62	+17.26	22,274	54.85	+3.87
Magali Duvernois	PS	NFP	11,776	28.23	+8.11	18,333	45.15	new
Philippe Gautier	HOR	Ensemble	8,527	20.44	-6.93	withdrew		
Yves Vola	ECO		906	2.17	-0.12			
Michel Treppo	LO		640	1.53	+0.11			
Votes			41,712	100.00		40,607	100.00	
Valid votes			41,712	97.26	-0.43	40,607	92.98	+0.15
Blank votes			761	1.77	+0.24	2,128	4.87	-0.29
Null votes			413	0.96	+0.18	939	2.15	-0.14
Turnout			42,886	65.51	+20.55	43,674	66.69	+23.64
Abstentions			22,583	34.49	-20.55	21,810	33.31	-23.64
Registered voters			65,469			65,484		
Result			RN HOLD					

=== 2022 ===
Legislative Election 2022: Doubs's 4th constituency
Party	Candidate	Votes	%	±%
RN	Géraldine Grangier	8,738	30.36	+6.25
LREM (Ensemble)	Frédéric Barbier	7,878	27.37	-10.10
LFI (NUPÉS)	Brigitte Cottier	5,791	20.12	+4.00
LR (UDC)	Matthieu Bloch	3,098	10.76	−6.56
REC	Philippe Vourron	1,232	4.28	N/A
DVE	Yves Vola	658	2.29	N/A
Others	N/A	1,390	-	−
Turnout		28,785	44.96	−2.28
2nd round result
RN	Géraldine Grangier	13,357	50.98	+12.62
LREM (Ensemble)	Frédéric Barbier	12,842	49.02	−12.62
Turnout		26,199	43.05	+0.36
RN gain from LREM				

=== 2017 ===
Candidate	Label	First round		Second round	
Candidate	Label	Votes	%	Votes	%
Frédéric Barbier	REM	11,524	37.47	15,841	61.64
Sophie Montel	FN	7,409	24.09	9,860	38.36
Valère Nedey	LR	5,325	17.32		
Nadia Barznica	FI	3,287	10.69		
Anna Maillard	ECO	1,141	3.71		
Christine Besançon	DLF	742	2.41		
Corinne Riquet	PCF	528	1.72		
Michel Treppo	EXG	327	1.06		
Gaëlle Pierron	DIV	230	0.75		
Yusuf Cetin	DIV	120	0.39		
Antonio Sanchez	EXG	119	0.39		
Votes		30,752	100.00	25,701	100.00
Valid votes		30,752	97.35	25,701	90.04
Blank votes		581	1.84	1,940	6.80
Null votes		257	0.81	904	3.17
Turnout		31,590	47.24	28,545	42.69
Abstentions		35,279	52.76	38,317	57.31
Registered voters		66,869		66,862	
Source: Ministry of the Interior

=== 2012 ===
2012 legislative election in Doubs's 4th constituency
Candidate	Party	First round		Second round	
Candidate	Party	Votes	%	Votes	%
Pierre Moscovici	PS	16,421	40.81%	19,311	49.32%
Sophie Montel	FN	9,605	23.87%	9,581	24.47%
Charles Demouge	UMP	9,341	23.21%	10,360	26.46%
Chantal Adami	FG	1,252	3.11%		
Ilker Ciftci	DVG	961	2.39%		
Bernard Lachambre	EELV	801	1.99%		
Didier Klein	PR	673	1.67%		
Jean-Claude Durupt	MoDem	409	1.02%		
Daniel Jeannin	POI	230	0.57%		
Michel Treppo	LO	208	0.52%		
Guillaume Reffay	AEI	182	0.45%		
Antonio Sanchez	Communistes	154	0.38%		
Valid votes		40,237	98.69%	39,152	98.23%
Spoilt and null votes		534	1.31%	704	1.77%
Votes cast / turnout		40,771	60.50%	39,856	59.14%
Abstentions		26,624	39.50%	27,536	40.86%
Registered voters		67,395	100.00%	67,392	100.00%

=== 2007 ===
Legislative Election 2007: Doubs's 4th constituency
Party	Candidate	Votes	%	±%
UMP	Irène Tharin	16,351	41.35	
PS	Pierre Moscovici	13,864	35.06	
FN	Sophie Montel	3,315	8.38	
MoDem	Catherine Guepratte	1,834	4.64	
LV	Françoise Grosjean	1,003	2.54	
Others	N/A	3,176	-	−
Turnout		40,314	59.67	
2nd round result
PS	Pierre Moscovici	20,480	50.93	
UMP	Irène Tharin	19,730	49.07	
Turnout		41,561	61.52	
PS gain from UMP				

=== 2002 ===
Legislative Election 2002: Doubs's 4th constituency
Party	Candidate	Votes	%	±%
PS	Pierre Moscovici	14,201	34.58	
UMP	Irène Tharin	13,351	32.51	
FN	Sophie Montel	8,053	19.61	
PCF	Yves Adami	972	2.37	
PR	Marie-France Mouquand	953	2.32	
Others	N/A	3,538	-	−
Turnout		42,107	64.19	
2nd round result
UMP	Irène Tharin	18,868	50.22	
PS	Pierre Moscovici	18,706	49.78	
Turnout		39,498	60.21	
UMP gain from PS				

=== 1997 ===
Legislative Election 1997: Doubs's 4th constituency
Party	Candidate	Votes	%	±%
PS	Pierre Moscovici	14,203	33.05	
RPR	Jean Geney	11,562	26.90	
FN	Alain Sébille	7,861	18.29	
PCF	Yves Adami	2,066	4.81	
EXG	Noëlle Grimme	1,863	4.33	
GE	José Paz	1,728	4.02	
MRC	Marie-France Mouquand	1,603	3.73	
LO	Georges Kvartskhava	1,216	2.83	
LDI	Philippe Lutz	878	2.04	
Turnout		45,062	70.58	
2nd round result
PS	Pierre Moscovici	25,771	58.15	
RPR	Jean Geney	18,545	41.85	
Turnout		47,509	74.42	
PS gain from RPR				

== Sources ==
Official results of French elections from 2002: "Résultats électoraux officiels en France" (in French).
