= Arbouans =

- Commune
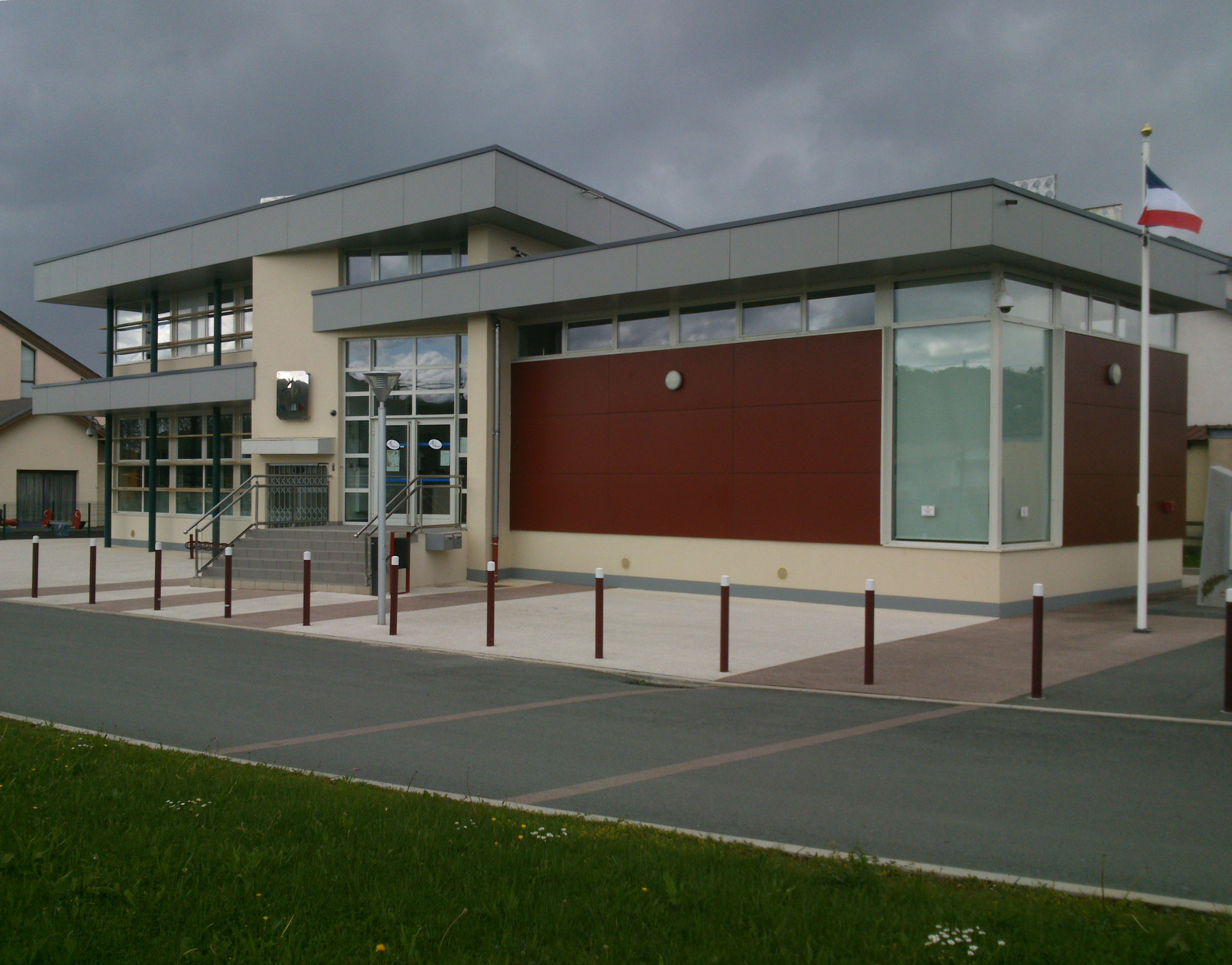
- The town hall in Arbouans
- Location of Arbouans
- Location within France Location within Bourgogne-Franche-Comté
- Coordinates: 47°29′29″N 6°48′40″E
- Country: France
- Region: Bourgogne-Franche-Comté
- Department: Doubs
- Arrondissement: Montbéliard
- Canton: Audincourt
- Intercommunality: Pays de Montbéliard Agglomération

Government
  - Mayor (2021–2026): Arnaud Rota
- Area^{1}: 1.32 km^{2} (0.51 sq mi)
- Highest elevation: 352 m (1,155 ft)
- Lowest elevation: 312 m (1,024 ft)
- Population (2023): 876
  - Density: 664/km^{2} (1,720/sq mi)
- Time zone: UTC+01:00 (CET)
  - Summer (DST): UTC+02:00 (CEST)
- INSEE/Postal code: 25020 /25400
- ^{1} French Land Register data, which excludes lakes, ponds, glaciers > 1 km^{2} (0.386 sq mi or 247 acres) and river estuaries.

Arbouans (French pronunciation: [aʁbwɑ̃]) is a commune in the Doubs department in the Bourgogne-Franche-Comté region in eastern France.

== Population ==
Historical population
Year	Pop.	±% p.a.
1968	1,019	—
1975	1,047	+0.39%
1982	942	−1.50%
1990	1,185	+2.91%
1999	1,096	−0.86%
2007	1,000	−1.14%
2012	966	−0.69%
2017	945	−0.44%
2023	876	−1.26%
Source: INSEE

== See also ==
- Communes of the Doubs department
