= Trévillers =

- Commune
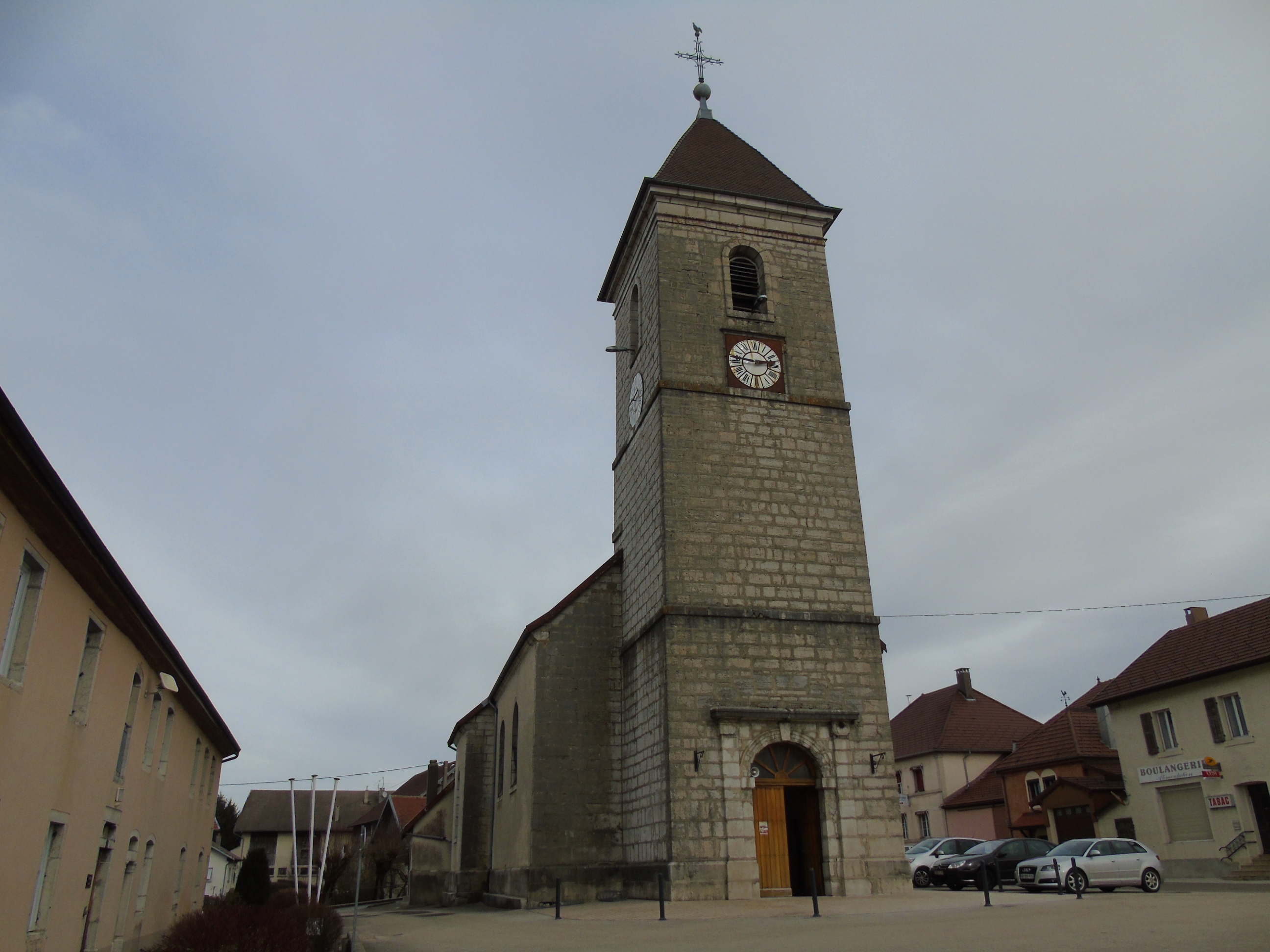
- The church in Trévillers

- Coat of arms
- Location of Trévillers
- Location within France Location within Bourgogne-Franche-Comté
- Coordinates: 47°16′59″N 6°52′12″E
- Country: France
- Region: Bourgogne-Franche-Comté
- Department: Doubs
- Arrondissement: Montbéliard
- Canton: Maîche

Government
  - Mayor (2020–2026): Luc Taillard
- Area^{1}: 10.74 km^{2} (4.15 sq mi)
- Highest elevation: 920 m (3,020 ft)
- Lowest elevation: 700 m (2,300 ft)
- Population (2023): 533
  - Density: 49.6/km^{2} (129/sq mi)
- Time zone: UTC+01:00 (CET)
  - Summer (DST): UTC+02:00 (CEST)
- INSEE/Postal code: 25571 /25470
- ^{1} French Land Register data, which excludes lakes, ponds, glaciers > 1 km^{2} (0.386 sq mi or 247 acres) and river estuaries.

Trévillers is a commune in the Doubs department in the Bourgogne-Franche-Comté region in eastern France.

== Geography ==
The commune lies 7 km (4.3 mi) northeast of Maîche between Belfort and Pontarlier. It is on the road to Switzerland.

== Population ==
Historical population
Year	Pop.	±% p.a.
1968	400	—
1975	409	+0.32%
1982	396	−0.46%
1990	410	+0.44%
1999	438	+0.74%
2007	478	+1.10%
2012	473	−0.21%
2017	484	+0.46%
2023	533	+1.62%
Source: INSEE

== See also ==
- Communes of the Doubs department
