= Hérimoncourt =

- Commune
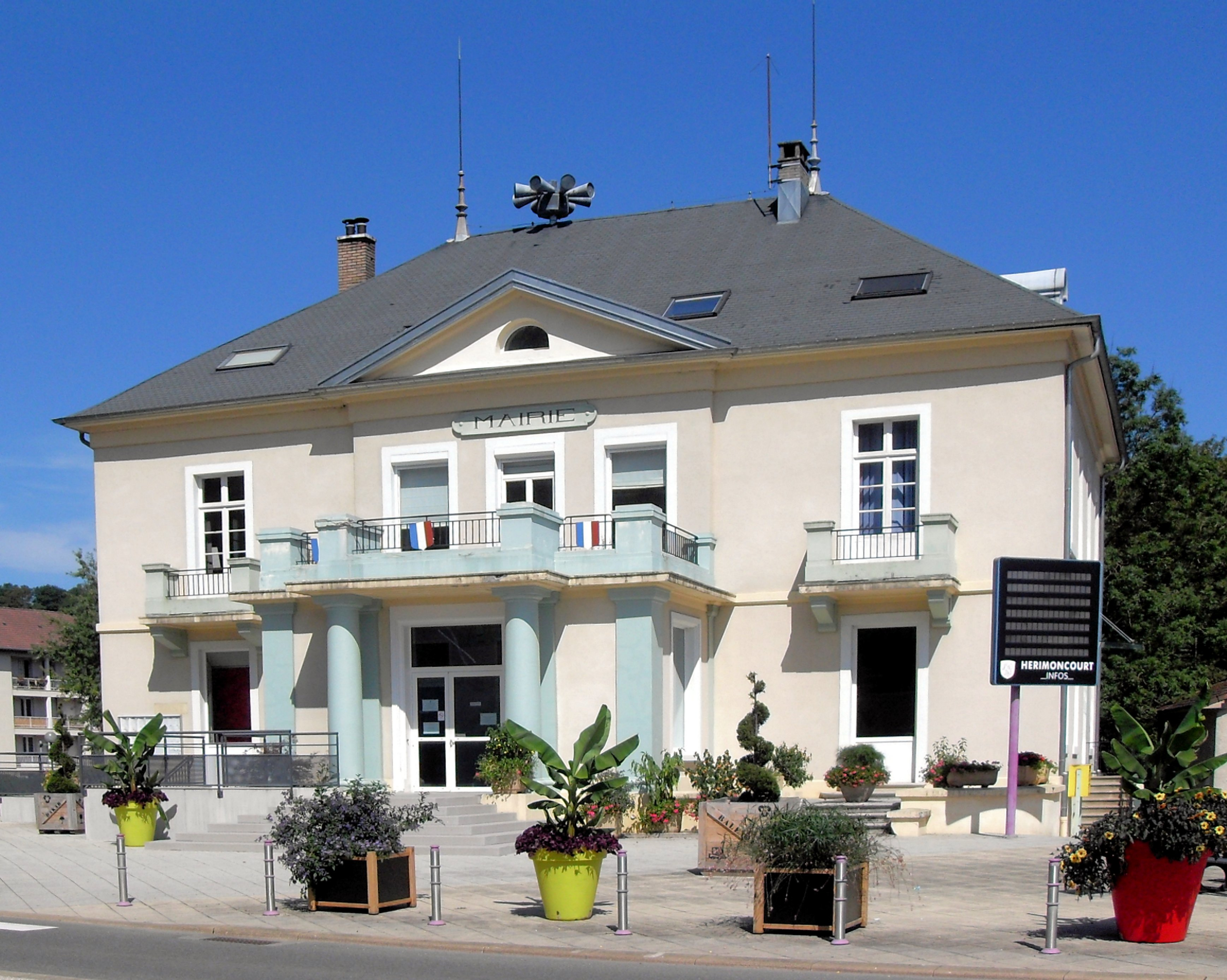
- The town hall in Hérimoncourt

- Coat of arms
- Location of Hérimoncourt
- Location within France Location within Bourgogne-Franche-Comté
- Coordinates: 47°26′29″N 6°53′02″E
- Country: France
- Region: Bourgogne-Franche-Comté
- Department: Doubs
- Arrondissement: Montbéliard
- Canton: Audincourt
- Intercommunality: Pays de Montbéliard Agglomération

Government
  - Mayor (2020–2026): Marie-France Bottarlini-Caputo
- Area^{1}: 7.29 km^{2} (2.81 sq mi)
- Highest elevation: 578 m (1,896 ft)
- Lowest elevation: 350 m (1,150 ft)
- Population (2023): 3,508
  - Density: 481/km^{2} (1,250/sq mi)
- Time zone: UTC+01:00 (CET)
  - Summer (DST): UTC+02:00 (CEST)
- INSEE/Postal code: 25304 /25310
- ^{1} French Land Register data, which excludes lakes, ponds, glaciers > 1 km^{2} (0.386 sq mi or 247 acres) and river estuaries.

Hérimoncourt (French pronunciation: [eʁimɔ̃kuʁ]) is a commune in the Doubs department in the Bourgogne-Franche-Comté region in eastern France.

== Population ==
Historical population
Year	Pop.	±% p.a.
1968	3,467	—
1975	3,180	−1.23%
1982	3,508	+1.41%
1990	3,923	+1.41%
1999	3,908	−0.04%
2007	3,863	−0.14%
2012	3,659	−1.08%
2017	3,632	−0.15%
2023	3,508	−0.58%
Source: INSEE

== See also ==
- Communes of the Doubs department
