= Nicolas Pacquot =

French politician (born 1978)

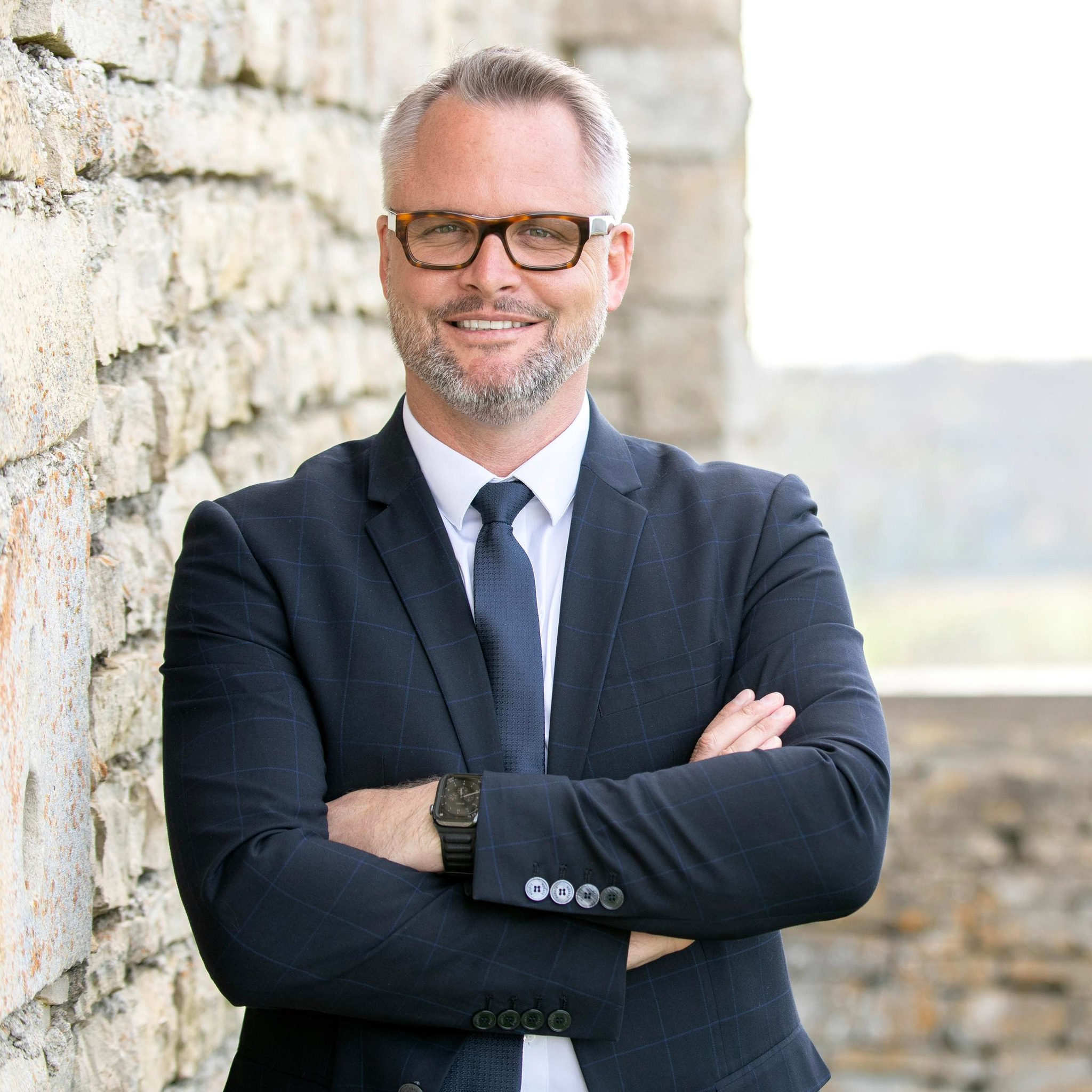

Member of the National Assembly for Doubs's 3rd constituency
- In office 21 June 2022 – 9 June 2024
- Preceded by: Denis Sommer
- Succeeded by: Matthieu Bloch

Personal details
- Born: 12 December 1978 (age 47) Montbéliard, France
- Party: Renaissance

Nicolas Pacquot (born 12 December 1978) is a French politician from Renaissance (RE). He was elected Member of Parliament for Doubs's 3rd constituency in the 2022 French legislative election.

== Biography ==
Nicolas Pacquot is the son of Peugeot factory workers. He was born and raised in the Montbéliard region.

An engineer, he worked for twenty years at PSA and then Stellantis.

At the end of 2021, he pledged his support to the Presidential Majority for the re-election of Emmanuel Macron.

Since December 15, 2021, he has also been the Horizons (political party) representative for the Pays de Montbéliard Agglomération region.

== See also ==
- List of deputies of the 16th National Assembly of France
