= Rémondans-Vaivre =

- Commune
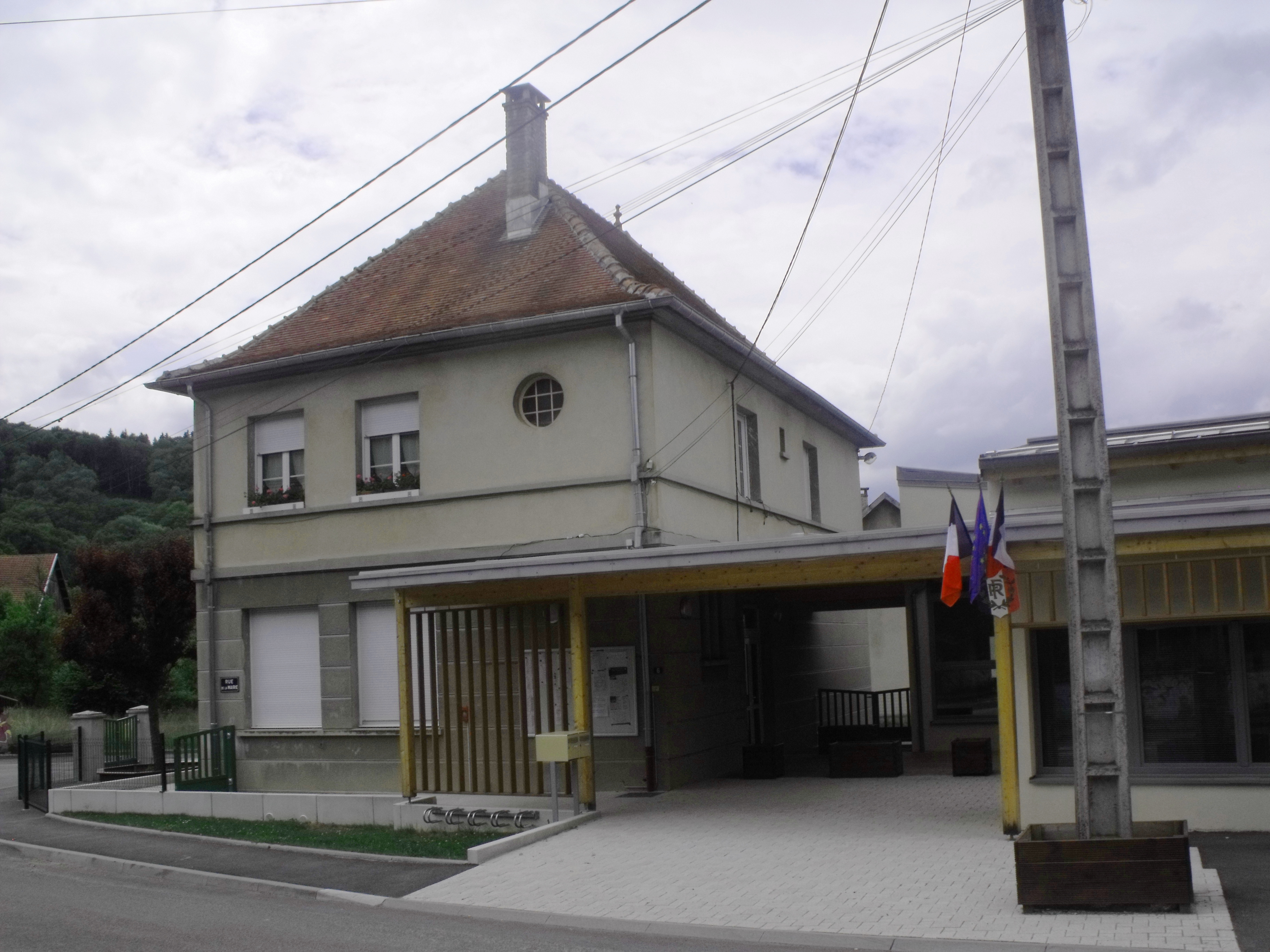
- The town hall in Rémondans-Vaivre
- Location of Rémondans-Vaivre
- Location within France Location within Bourgogne-Franche-Comté
- Coordinates: 47°22′34″N 6°42′50″E
- Country: France
- Region: Bourgogne-Franche-Comté
- Department: Doubs
- Arrondissement: Montbéliard
- Canton: Valentigney
- Intercommunality: Pays de Montbéliard Agglomération

Government
  - Mayor (2020–2026): Jacques Pellicioli
- Area^{1}: 9.19 km^{2} (3.55 sq mi)
- Highest elevation: 772 m (2,533 ft)
- Lowest elevation: 377 m (1,237 ft)
- Population (2023): 205
  - Density: 22.3/km^{2} (57.8/sq mi)
- Time zone: UTC+01:00 (CET)
  - Summer (DST): UTC+02:00 (CEST)
- INSEE/Postal code: 25485 /25150
- ^{1} French Land Register data, which excludes lakes, ponds, glaciers > 1 km^{2} (0.386 sq mi or 247 acres) and river estuaries.

Rémondans-Vaivre (French pronunciation: [ʁemɔ̃dɑ̃ vɛvʁ]) is a commune in the Doubs department in the Bourgogne-Franche-Comté region in eastern France.

== Population ==
Historical population
Year	Pop.	±% p.a.
1968	102	—
1975	101	−0.14%
1982	155	+6.31%
1990	181	+1.96%
1999	180	−0.06%
2007	217	+2.36%
2012	231	+1.26%
2017	234	+0.26%
2023	205	−2.18%
Source: INSEE

== See also ==
- Communes of the Doubs department
