= Géraldine Grangier =

French politician (born 1975)

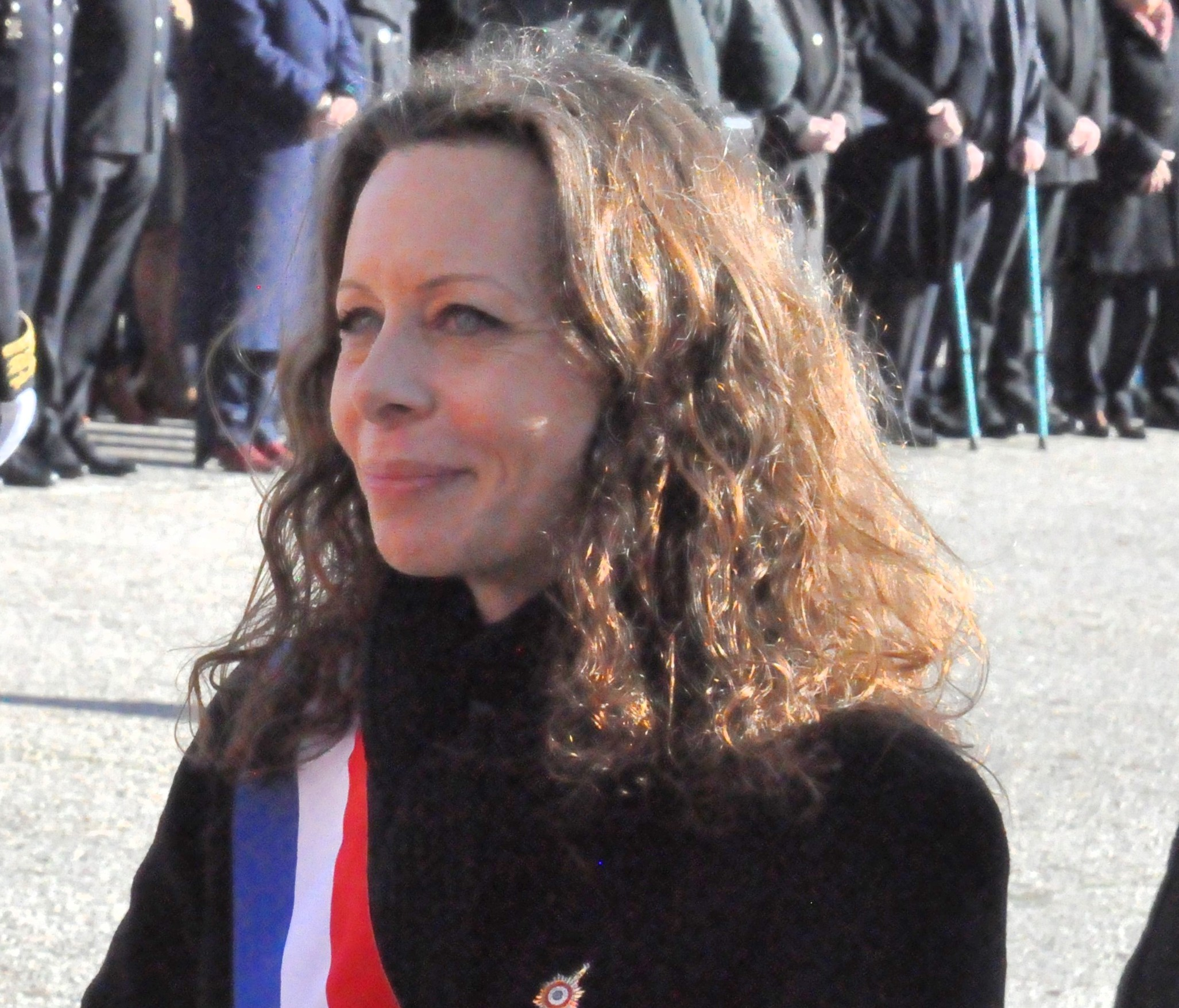

Member of the National Assembly for Doubs's 4th constituency
- Incumbent
- Assumed office 22 June 2022
- Preceded by: Frédéric Barbier

Member of the Regional Council of Bourgogne-Franche-Comté
- Incumbent
- Assumed office 2 July 2021

Personal details
- Born: 13 February 1975 (age 51) Besançon, France
- Party: National Rally (2019–present)
- Profession: Social worker

Géraldine Grangier (French pronunciation: [ʒeʁaldin ɡʁɑ̃ʒje]; born 13 February 1975) is a French politician of the National Rally (RN) who has represented the 4th constituency of Doubs in the National Assembly since 2022. She narrowly defeated La République En Marche! outgoing deputy Frédéric Barbier with 50.9% of the second-round vote. She was re-elected in 2024 with 54.8% of the second-round vote.

Grangier was a social worker in Besançon before entering politics. She joined the RN in 2019 and was elected to the Regional Council of Bourgogne-Franche-Comté in 2021.
