= Audincourt =

- Commune
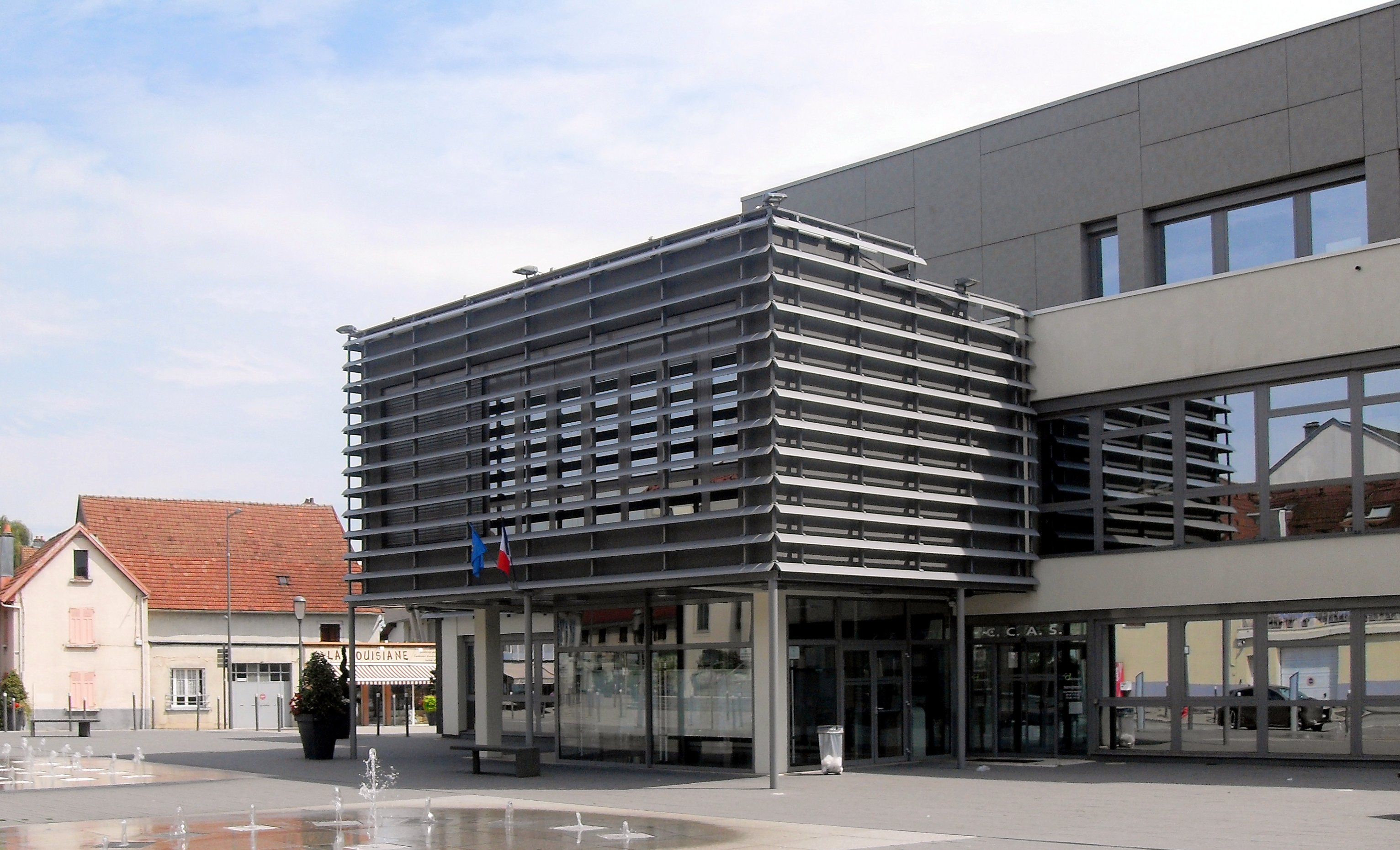
- The town hall in Audincourt

- Coat of arms
- Location of Audincourt
- Location within France Location within Bourgogne-Franche-Comté
- Coordinates: 47°29′01″N 6°50′25″E
- Country: France
- Region: Bourgogne-Franche-Comté
- Department: Doubs
- Arrondissement: Montbéliard
- Canton: Audincourt
- Intercommunality: Pays de Montbéliard Agglomération

Government
  - Mayor (2020–2026): Martial Bourquin (PS)
- Area^{1}: 8.76 km^{2} (3.38 sq mi)
- Highest elevation: 417 m (1,368 ft)
- Lowest elevation: 314 m (1,030 ft)
- Population (2023): 14,071
  - Density: 1,610/km^{2} (4,160/sq mi)
- Time zone: UTC+01:00 (CET)
  - Summer (DST): UTC+02:00 (CEST)
- INSEE/Postal code: 25031 /25400
- Website: www.audincourt.fr
- ^{1} French Land Register data, which excludes lakes, ponds, glaciers > 1 km^{2} (0.386 sq mi or 247 acres) and river estuaries.

Audincourt (French pronunciation: [odɛ̃kuʁ]; Frainc-Comtou: Adïncouét) is a commune in the Doubs department in the Bourgogne-Franche-Comté region in eastern France.

It is also known as the “capital of turbidity” because of the extremely murky water in the Doubs and the Gland.

== History ==
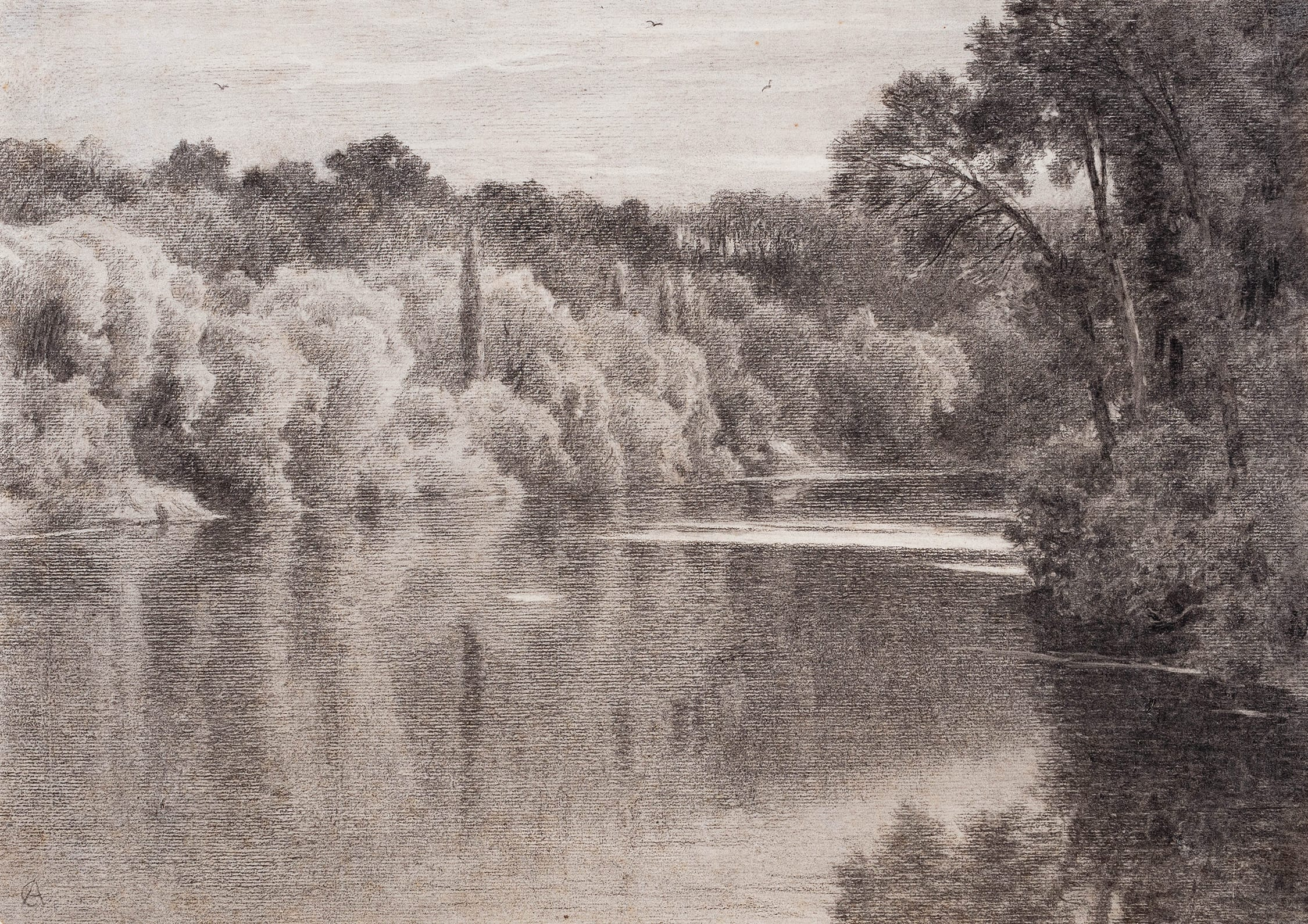
Bords du Doubs a Audincourt ("Banks of the Doubs at Audincourt") by Alfred de Curzon

Audincourt belonged to the County of Montbéliard which became part of France in 1793, during the French Revolutionary Wars.

== Population ==
Historical population

Year	Pop.	±% p.a.
1793	660	—
1800	535	−2.96%
1806	734	+5.41%
1821	936	+1.63%
1831	1,265	+3.06%
1836	1,432	+2.51%
1841	1,627	+2.59%
1846	2,024	+4.46%
1851	2,144	+1.16%
1856	2,513	+3.23%
1861	2,864	+2.65%
1866	3,236	+2.47%
1872	3,724	+2.37%
1876	4,258	+3.41%
1881	4,599	+1.55%
1886	4,865	+1.13%
1891	5,228	+1.45%
1896	5,482	+0.95%
1901	7,347	+6.03%

Year	Pop.	±% p.a.
1906	7,633	+0.77%
1911	8,694	+2.64%
1921	8,760	+0.08%
1926	9,648	+1.95%
1931	9,918	+0.55%
1936	9,720	−0.40%
1946	9,040	−0.72%
1954	10,282	+1.62%
1962	12,433	+2.40%
1968	13,488	+1.37%
1975	18,578	+4.68%
1982	17,454	−0.89%
1990	16,361	−0.81%
1999	15,539	−0.57%
2007	14,595	−0.78%
2012	14,787	+0.26%
2017	13,387	−1.97%
2023	14,071	+0.83%

Source: EHESS and INSEE (1968-2023)

== Economy ==
An iron foundry was established early in the nineteenth century to refine the ore from the rich mines near Bethoncourt.

== Personalities ==
- Daniel Beretta, retired voice actor
- Alassane N'Diaye, footballer
- Camel Meriem, footballer
- Irène Tharin, politician

== See also ==
- Communes of the Doubs department
