= List of French people of Maghrebi origin =

This is a list of famous French people of full or partial Maghrebi ancestry (having Jewish, Arabic or Berber ancestry from Algeria, Morocco or Tunisia).

== Entertainment ==
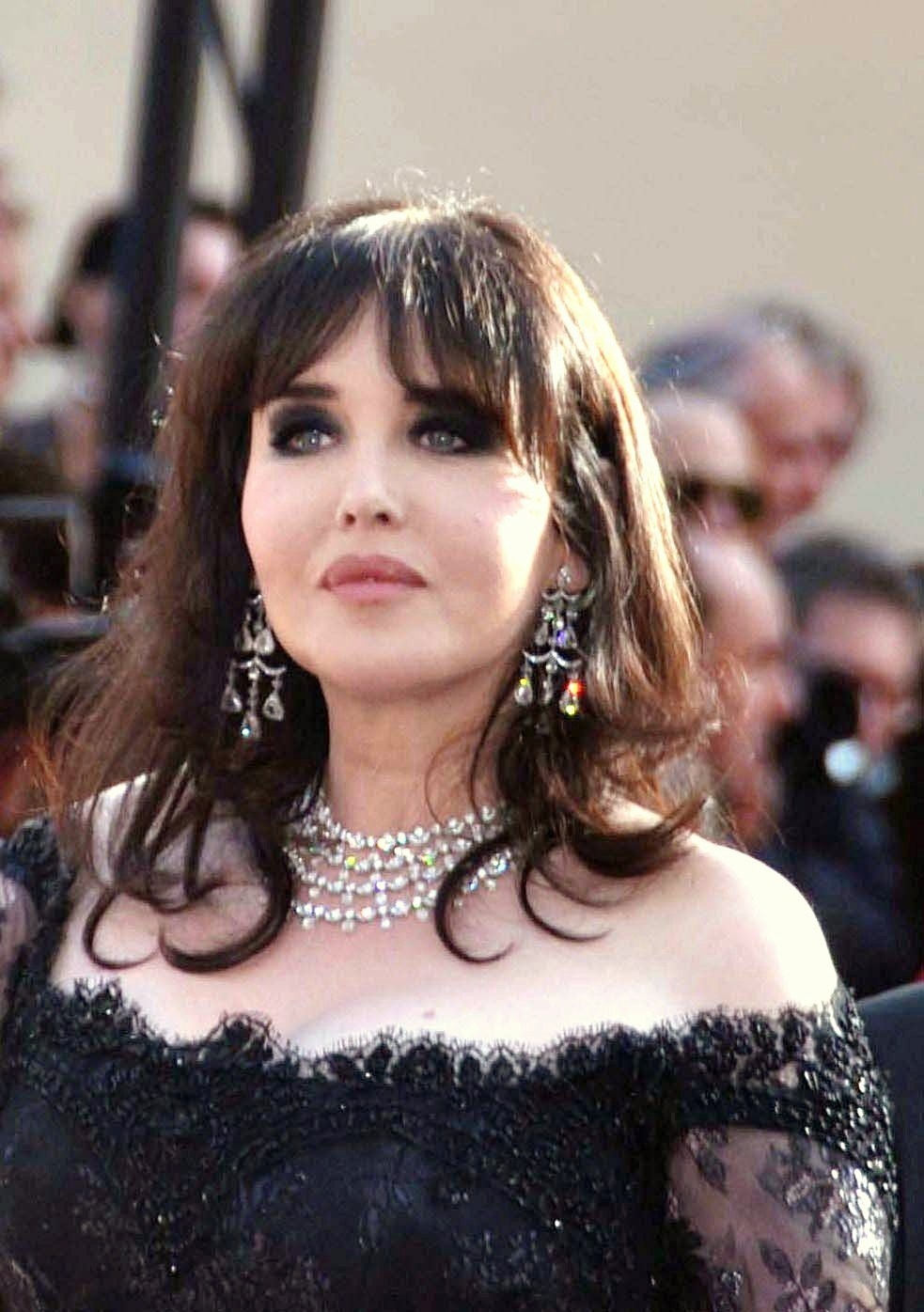
Isabelle Adjani

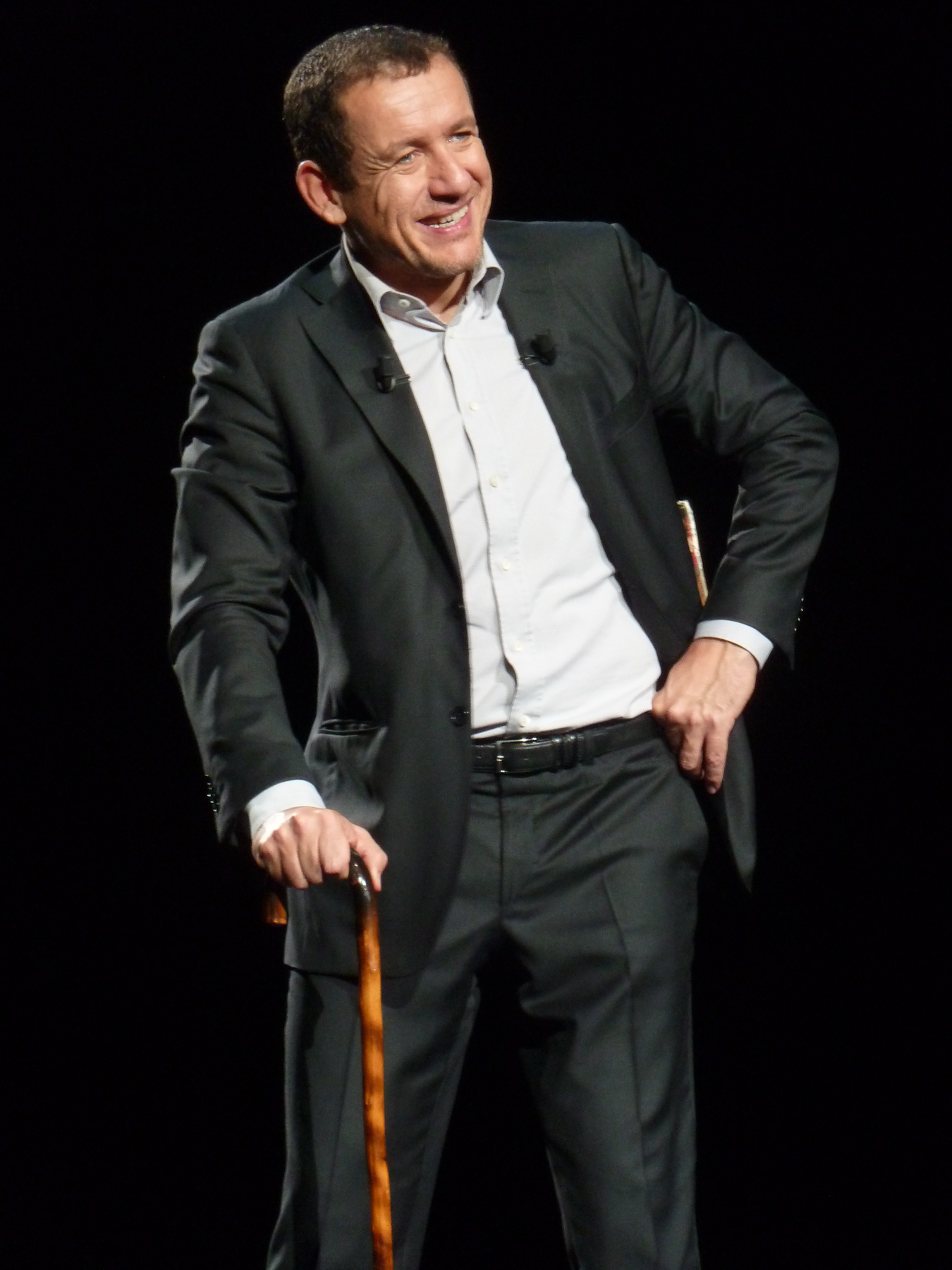
Dany Boon

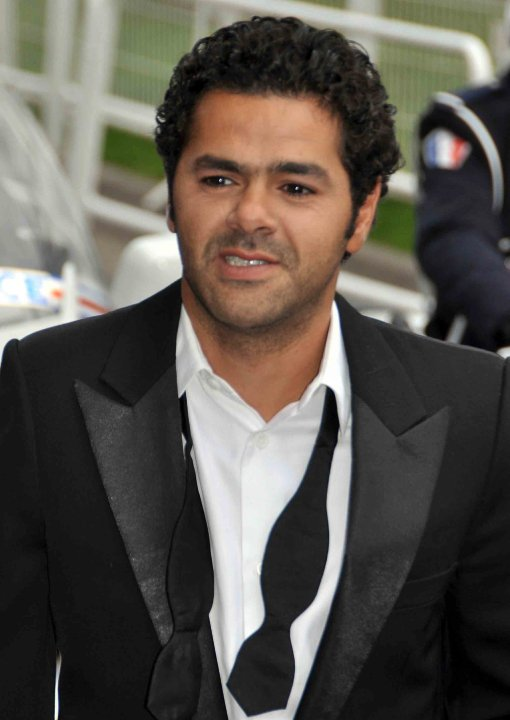
Jamel Debbouze

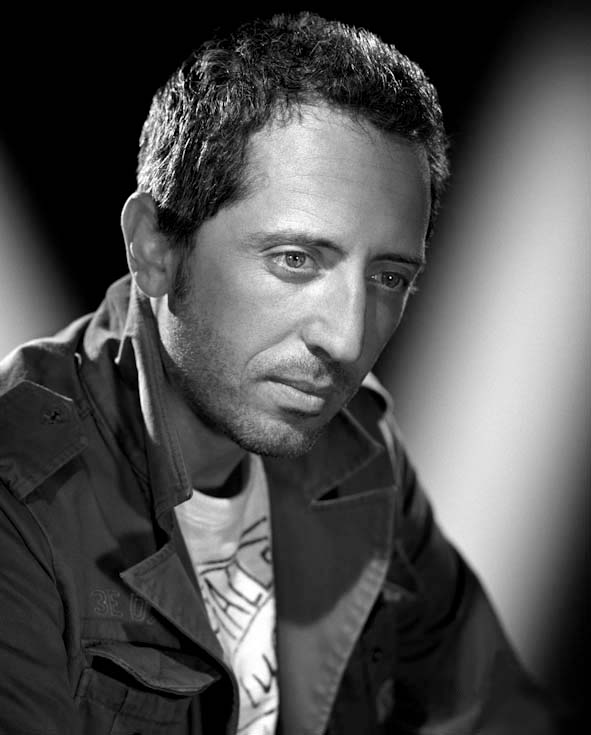
Gad Elmaleh

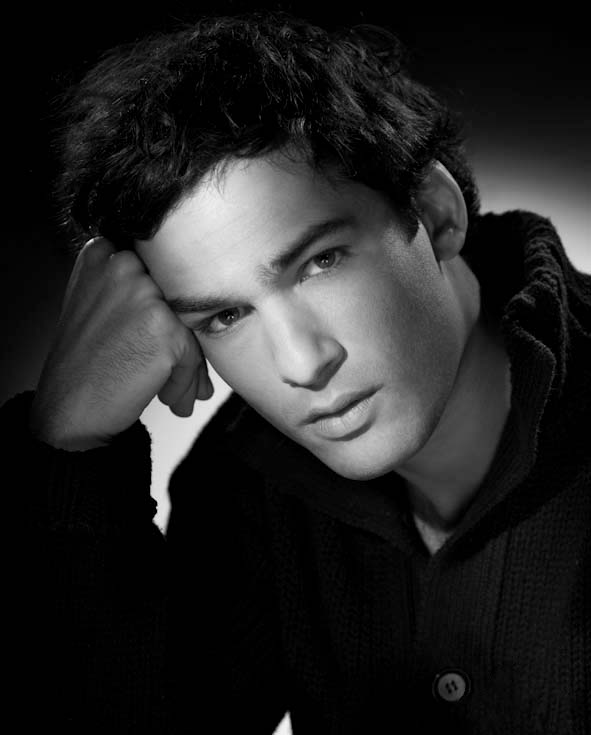
Nicolas Cazale

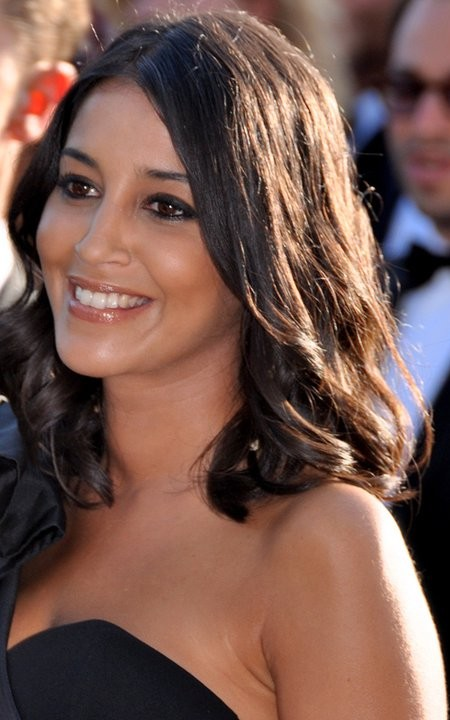
Leïla Bekhti

- Fu'ad Aït Aattou, actor, Moroccan Berber father and French mother
- Cédric Ben Abdallah (Ben), humorist, Algerian father and French mother
- Isabelle Adjani, actress, Algerian father and German mother. She holds the record for most César Awards for Best Actress with five awards.
- Richard Anconina, actor
- Aure Atika (1970-), actress
- Jean-Pierre Bacri, actor
- Ramzy Bedia, actor
- Leïla Bekhti (1984–), actress, César Award for Most Promising Actress in 2011
- Catherine Belkhodja (1955–), artist, and her daughters Isild Le Besco and Maïwenn Le Besco, actress, Algerian father and French mother
- Yasmine Belmadi, actor
- Robert Benayoun, movie critic
- José Bénazéraf, film director, scriptwriter and producer
- Adel Bencherif, actor
- Yamina Benguigui, film director, Junior Minister for French Nationals Abroad and Relations with La Francophonie (French-speaking countries worldwide) at the Ministry of Foreign Affairs
- Farouk Bermouga, French actor, Algerian father and French mother
- Sami Bouajila, actor
- Rachida Brakni, actress
- Jean Benguigui, actor
- Richard Berry, actor
- Dany Boon (1966–), French actor, Algerian father and French mother
- Michel Boujenah, humorist
- Paul Boujenah, director
- Nicolas Cazalé, actor, French father and Algerian mother
- Alain Chabat, comedian, film director, scriptwriter and producer
- Élie Chouraqui, film director, producer and scriptwriter
- Farid Chopel (1952–2008), actor
- Abdel Raouf Dafri, scriptwriter
- Gérard Darmon, actor
- Jamel Debbouze, humorist
- Nadia Farès, actress
- Samir Guesmi, actor
- Nora Hamdi (1968–), film director
- Roger Hanin, actor filmmaker
- Hafsia Herzi, actress
- Agnès Jaoui, actress
- Saïda Jawad (1970-), actress
- Anissa Kate, pornstar, Algerian father and French mother
- Abdellatif Kechiche, film director
- Salim Kechiouche, actor
- Yasmine Lafitte (née Hafida El Khabchi), pornstar
- Claude Lelouch, film director, producer, scriptwriter and actor, Algerian Jewish father and French mother
- Jalil Lespert, actor, French father and Algerian mother
- Mabrouk El Mechri, film director
- Kad Merad, actor
- Samy Naceri (1961–), actor, Algerian Kabyle father and French mother
- Marie-José Nat, actress, Algerian Kabyle father and Corsican mother. Best Actress at the 1974 Cannes Film Festival for her performance in Les Violons du bal
- Mehdi Nebbou - French actor, Algerian father and German mother
- Safy Nebbou - French actor, Algerian father and German mother
- Polaire, dancer and actress
- Daniel Prévost (1939–), actor and comedian and his son Sören Prévost, comedian. Algerian Kabyle father and French mother
- Tahar Rahim (1981–), actor, César Award for Best Actor in 2010, European Film Award for Best Actor in 2009
- Sabrina Ouazani, actress
- Samy Seghir, actor
- Zinedine Soualem, actor
- Elisa Tovati, actress, Moroccan Jewish father and Russian Jewish mother
- Saïd Taghmaoui, actor
- Jacques Villeret (1951–2005), actor, Algerian father and French mother
- Michaël Youn, actor, Algerian-Moroccan Jewish father and Italian-Hungarian Jewish mother
- Ariel Zeitoun, film director, scriptwriter and producer
- Roschdy Zem (1965-), actor
- Soufiane El Khalidy ( 1987-), actor, filmmaker, writer, Moroccan Parents
- Malik Zidi (1975–), actor, Algerian Kabyle father and Breton mother
- Claude Zidi, filmmaker

== Music ==
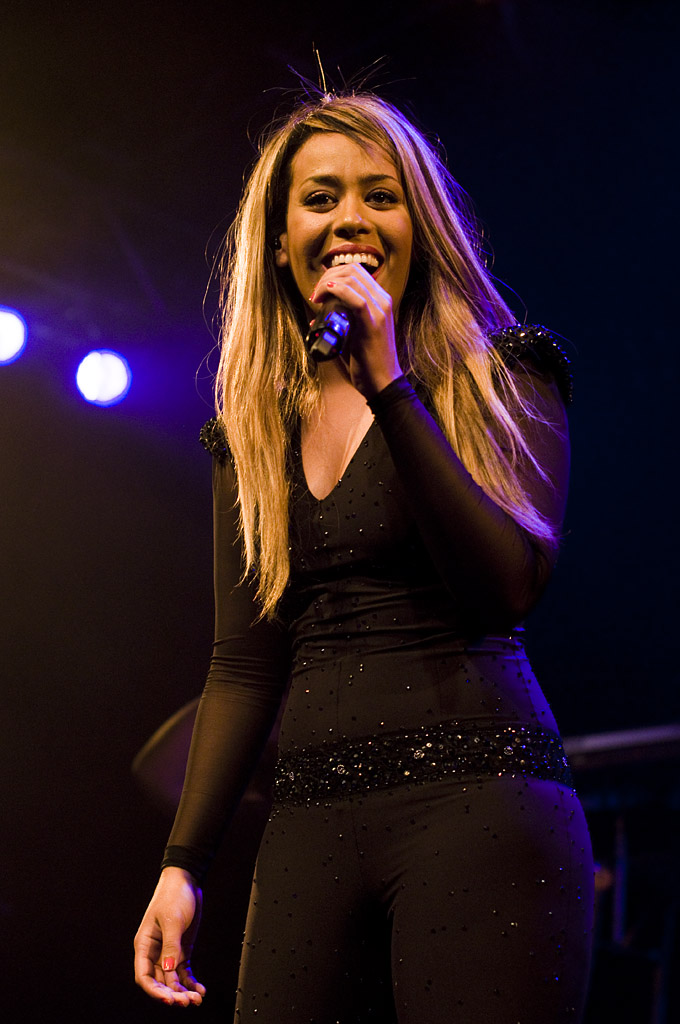
Amel Bent

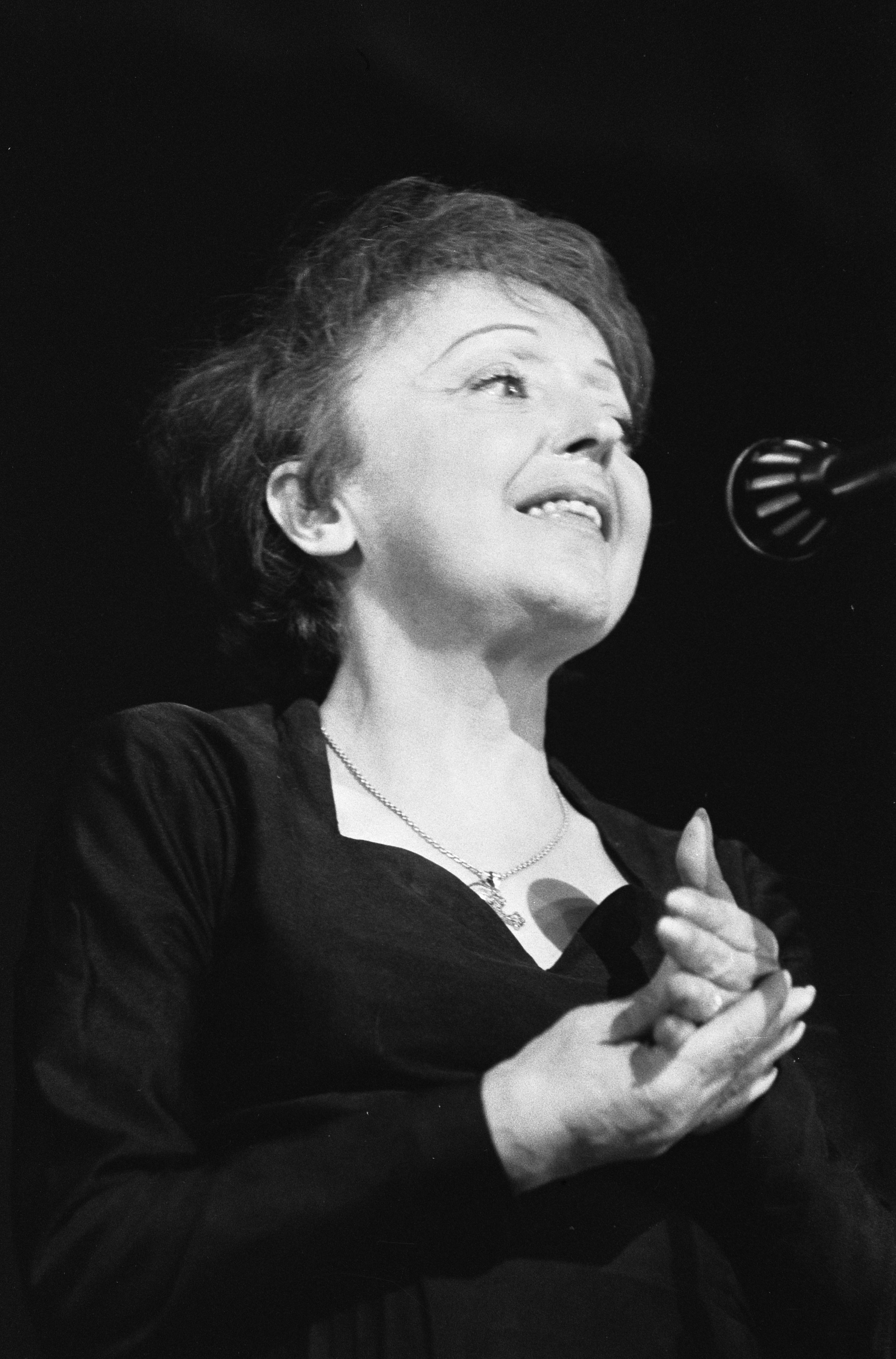
Édith Piaf

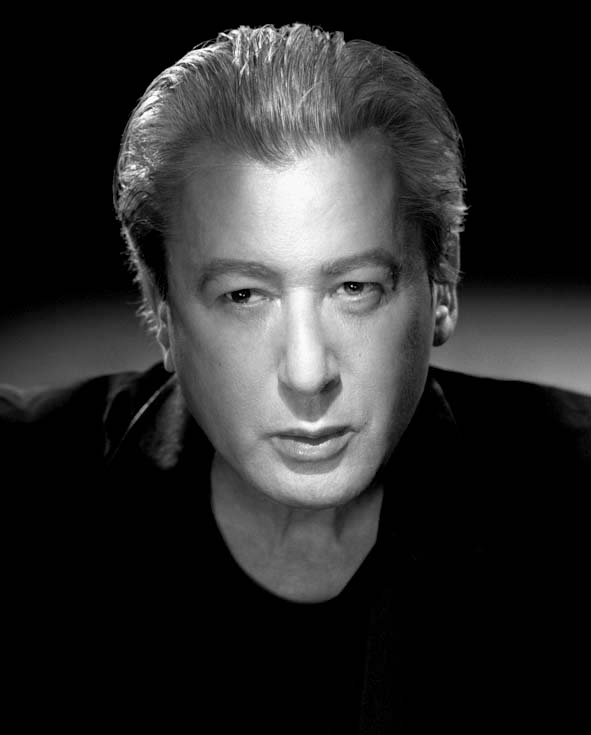
Alain Bashung

- L'Algérino, rapper
- Franck Amsallem, pianist
- Chimène Badi, singer
- Alain Bashung (1947–), author, composer, performer and comedian, Algerian father and Breton mother
- Kader Belarbi, French choreographer, Algerian father and French mother
- Amel Bent (1985-), singer
- Louis Bertignac (born to an Algerian Jewish father and Spanish mother), musician
- Frida Boccara, singer
- Dany Brillant, singer
- Patrick Bruel, born Maurice Benguigui, singer, French Jewish father and Tunisian Jewish mother
- Canardo, rapper
- Cut Killer, DJ
- Marcel Dadi, guitar player
- Étienne Daho, singer
- Demon One, rapper, Algerian father and French mother
- Big Flo and oli, band singer
- DJ Abdel, DJ
- DJ Mam's, DJ, record producer
- DJ Mehdi, DJ
- DJ Snake, DJ
- Indila, singer
- Kenza Farah, singer
- Faudel, singer
- Jenifer, singer, Algerian Jewish father and Corsican-Italian mother
- Adrien Gallo, musician (BB Brunes) and actor, French father and Algerian mother
- Félix Gray, singer
- David Guetta, DJ de house, Moroccan Jewish father and Belgian mother
- Gad Elmaleh, humorist
- Hakimakli, DJ, Italian father and Algerian mother
- Marina Kaye, singer
- Kamelanc', rapper (aka Kamelancien)
- Lââm, singer
- Lacrim, rapper
- La Fouine, rapper, singer, songwriter and actor
- Larusso, singer
- Sheryfa Luna, singer
- Melissa M, singer
- Enrico Macias, singer
- Didier Marouani, composer and musician
- Médine, rapper
- Mister You, rapper
- Marcel Mouloudji (1922–1994), poet and singer, and his daughter Annabelle, Algerian father and Breton mother
- Yael Naim, singer
- Najim, singer, Algerian father and French mother
- Nessbeal, rapper
- Juliette Noureddine (1962–), singer, author and composer
- Édith Piaf (1915–1963), singer.
- Karim Réveillé, musician (BB Brunes) French Antilles father and Algerian mother
- Ridan, singer
- Damien Saez - French singer
- Sapho, singer
- Sinik, rapper, Algerian father and French mother
- Souf, singer
- Martial Solal, Jazz pianist
- Jacqueline Taïeb, singer
- Tunisiano, rapper

== Politics ==
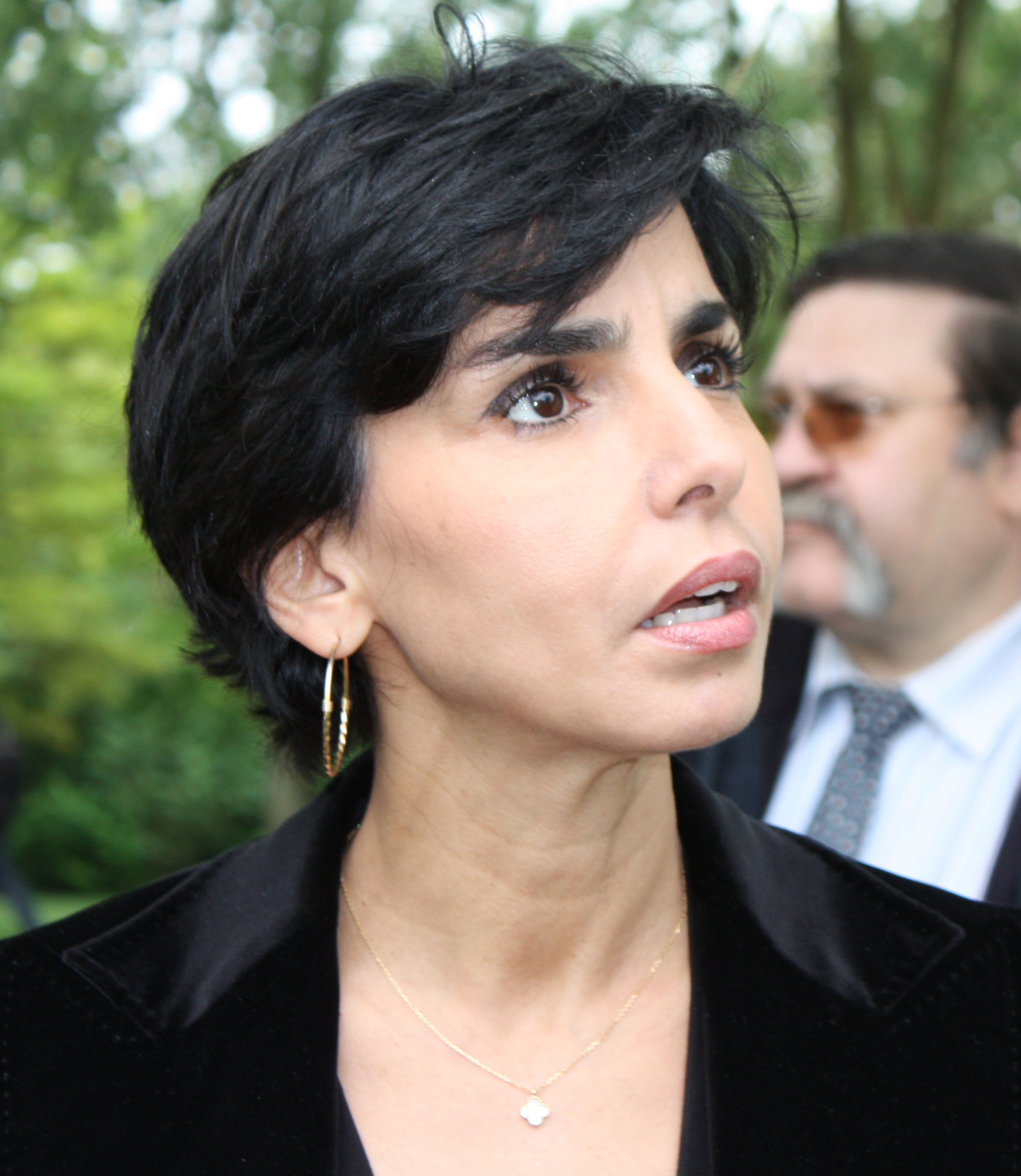
Rachida Dati

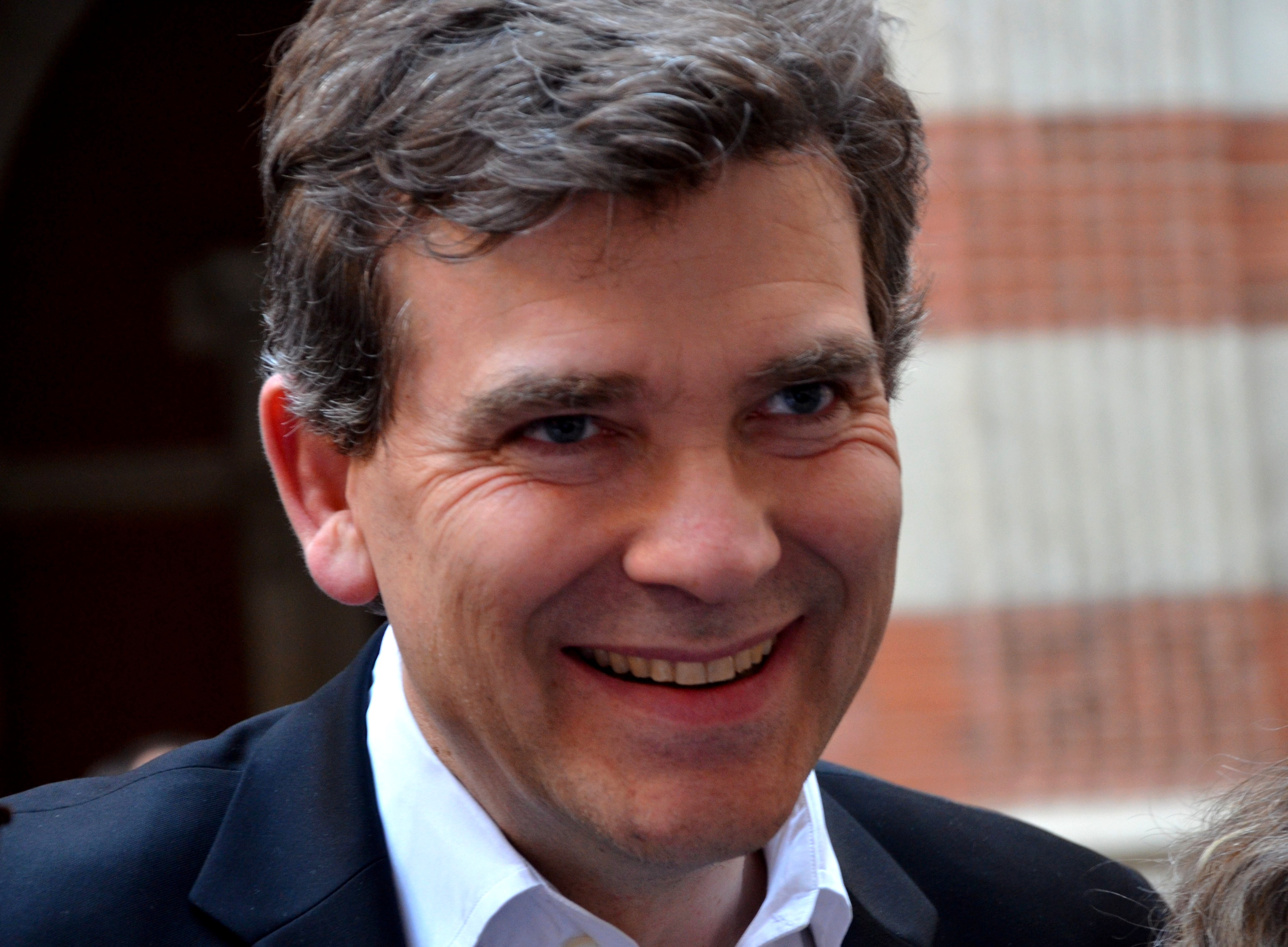
Arnaud Montebourg

- Leila Aïchi, Senator (2011-)
- Fadela Amara, Secretary of State (2007-2010)
- Kader Arif, Euro-MP (2004-2012), Junior Minister (ministre délégué), then Secretary of State (2012-2014), national MP (2014-)
- David Assouline, Senator (2004-)
- Avi Assouly, national MP (2012-2014)
- Azouz Begag, writer, Junior Minister (2005-2007)
- Najat Vallaud-Belkacem, Minister (2012-), Moroccan-Algerian father and Moroccan-Spanish mother
- Malika Benarab-Attou, Euro-MP (2009-2014)
- Nora Berra, Secretary of State (2009-2012), Euro-MP (2012-2014)
- Yasmine Boudjenah, Euro-MP (1999-2004)
- Alima Boumediene-Thiery, Euro-MP (1999-2004), Senator (2004-2011), Moroccan father and French mother
- Kheira Bouziane, national MP (2012-)
- Pascal Cherki, national MP (2012-)
- Jean-François Copé politician, Romanian Jewish father and Algerian Jewish mother
- Gérald Moussa Darmanin national MP (2012-), mayor of Tourcoing (2014-), Maltese father and Algerian-French mother
- Rachida Dati, Minister of Justice
- Karima Delli, Euro-MP (2009-)
- Julien Dray, politician
- Myriam El Khomri, Minister, Moroccan father and Breton mother
- Samia Ghali, Senator (2008-)
- Jérôme Guedj, national MP (2014-)
- Meyer Habib, national MP (2013-)
- Razzy Hammadi, national MP (2012-)
- Roger Karoutchi, politician
- Bariza Khiari, Senator (2004-)
- Chaynesse Khirouni, national MP (2012-)
- Pierre Lellouche, politician
- Arnaud Montebourg French father and Algerian-French mother, former minister
- Sami Nair, Euro-MP (1999-2004)
- Daphna Poznanski-Benhamou, national MP (2012-2013)
- Tokia Saïfi, Euro-MP, former Secretary of State
- Gérard Sebaoun, national MP (2012-)
- Dominique Strauss-Kahn politician, French Jewish father and Tunisian Jewish mother
- Djida Tazdaït, Euro-MP (1989-1994)
- Nora Zaïdi, Euro-MP (1989-1994)
- Karim Zéribi, politician.

== Sports ==
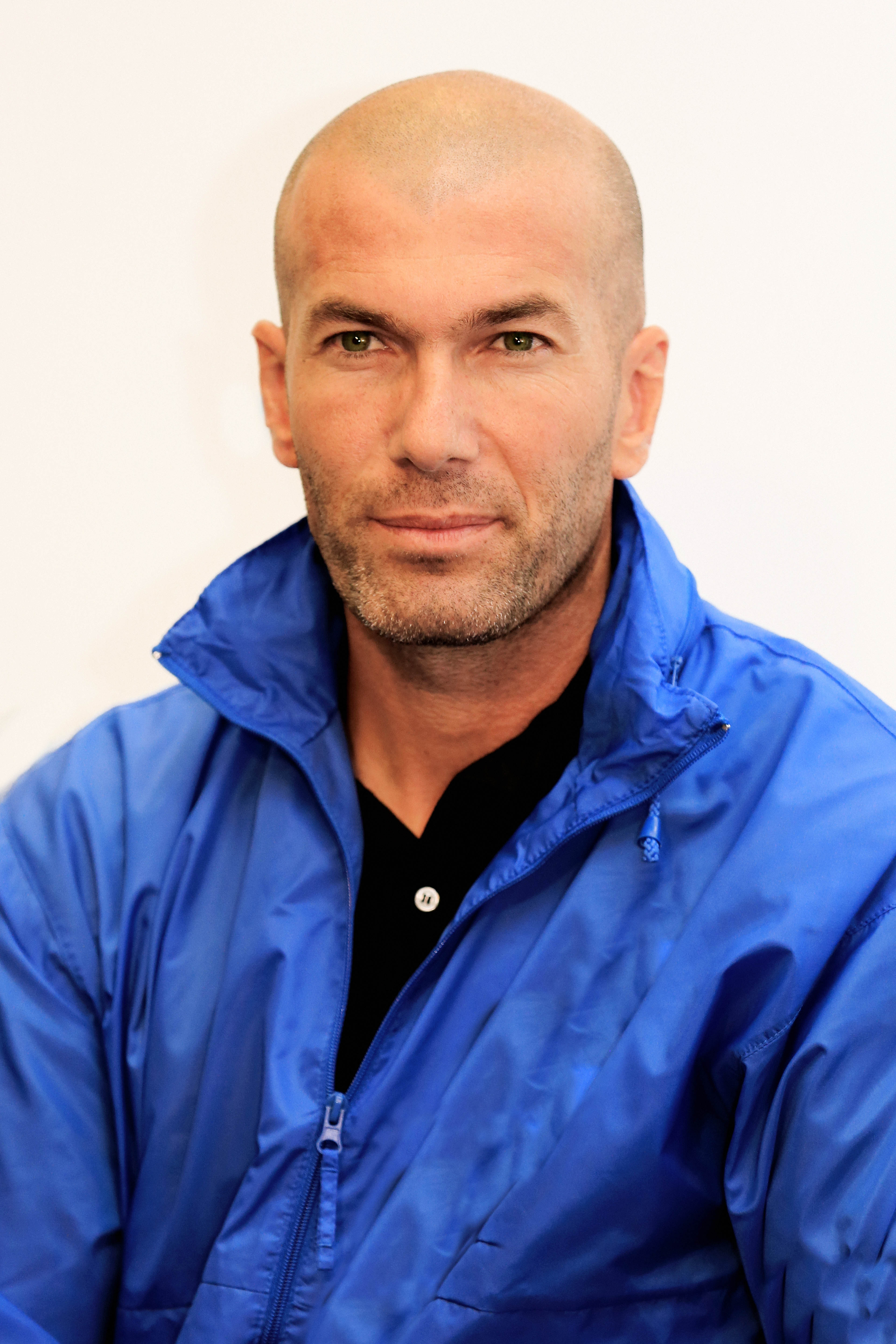
Zinedine Zidane

- Robert Abdesselam, tennis player, Algerian Kabyle father and Italian mother
- Karim Benzema (1987–), football player
- Larbi Benboudaoud (1974-), judoka, silver medal in the 2000 Olympic Games in Sydney, Australia
- Djamel Bouras (1971-), judoka, gold medal in the 1996 Olympic Games in Atlanta, USA
- Pierre Darmon, tennis player
- Alphonse Halimi, boxer
- David Jemmali, football player
- Kylian Mbappé, football player, Cameroonian Sawa father and Algerian Kabyle mother
- Maxime Mermoz, French professional rugby union footballer
- Alain Mimoun (1921–2013), Olympic marathon champion
- Samir Nasri (1987–), football player
- Zinedine Zidane, football player

== Others ==
- Jacques Attali, economist
- Jeanne Benameur, writer, Algerian father and Italian mother
- Paul Bénichou, historian
- Nina Bouraoui (1967–), writer, Algerian father and French mother
- Jean Daniel BenSaïd (1920–), director of Le Nouvel Observateur
- Hélène Cixous, writer
- Annie Cohen-Solal, writer
- Claude Cohen-Tannoudji, physicist, Nobel Prize laurette (1997)
- Jacques Derrida, philosopher
- Jean-Pierre Elkabbach, journalist
- Pierre Fédida, psychoanalyst
- Denis Guedj, writer and mathematician
- Bernard-Henri Lévy, writer and philosopher
- Benjamin Stora, historian
- Pierre Assouline, journalist
- Gisèle Halimi, lawyer
- Serge Halimi, journalist
- Alain Mamou-Mani, producer
- Albert Memmi, writer
- Serge Moati, journalist and film director
- Leila Sebbar, writer, Algerian father and French mother
- Maurice Taieb, geologist, Tunisian father and French mother

== See also ==
- Maghrebis
- Maghrebis in France
