= Charmont =

Charmont is the name or part of the name of the following communes in France:

- Charmont, Marne, in the Marne department
- Charmont, Val-d'Oise, in the Val-d'Oise department
- Charmont-en-Beauce, in the Loiret department
- Charmont-sous-Barbuise, in the Aube department
- Grand-Charmont, in the Doubs department
- Vieux-Charmont, in the Doubs department
