= Nasser Ramdane Ferradj =

French political activist (1972–2021)

Deputy Mayor of Noisy-le-Sec
- In office 2008–2010

Personal details
- Born: 1972
- Died: 20 April 2021 (aged 49)
- Party: PS

Nasser Ramdane Ferradj (1972 – 20 April 2021) was a French anti-racist and political activist.

== Biography ==
Ferradj's grandparents arrived in France in 1959. He was born to a grocer and maternal assistant and grew up in Nanterre with his three brothers. In 1986, he joined protests against the Projet de loi Devaquet, which would have changed the French university system. He then joined the NGO SOS Racisme two years later. Also in 1988, he became a permanent member of the Fédération indépendante et démocratique lycéenne alongside Delphine Batho. He joined the Socialist Party and petitioned the Rocard II Cabinet to dedicate more resources to the country's secondary schools. His petitions were welcomed by President François Mitterrand at the Élysée Palace. An emergency plan for secondary schools was created, with 4.5 billion francs allocated along with the creation of the Conseil des délégués pour la vie lycéenne.

Ferradj founded the Organisation des banlieues unies, an associate organization of SOS Racisme. He became vice-president of the latter in 1995. After being urged by Fodé Sylla, he joined the French Communist Party in 2000, but left in 2003. He ran for President of SOS Racisme in 1999 but was defeated by Malek Boutih.

In the 2008 French municipal elections, Ferradj campaigned for the Socialist Party in Noisy-le-Sec and served as Deputy Mayor until 2010. Following the Charlie Hebdo shooting in 2015, he called for universalist anti-racism, creating the Collectif des Musulmans progressistes et laïques. He was invited to appear on the conservative news channel CNews in 2019 but abruptly left the stage and called for a boycott of the channel.

Nasser Ramdane Ferradj died on 20 April 2021 at the age of 49. SOS Racisme President Dominique Sopo left him a tribute, stating "In recent years, Nasser has been fascinated by questions of secularism, both to defend it against fundamentalists and to denounce its misuse among those who used it, to hide this anti-Arab racism which he obviously could not stand".
