= March for Equality and Against Racism =

1983 anti-racist demonstration in France

The March for Equality and Against Racism (French: Marche pour l’égalité et contre le racisme), also called the March of the Arabs (French: Marche des beurs) by French media (beur is the backslang of arabe), was a demonstration concerning issues of racism and immigration that took place in France in 1983, from October 15 to December 3.

It was the first national demonstration of its type in France.

== Genesis ==
In the summer of 1983, riots occurred in the district of Les Minguettes in Vénissieux, a suburb city of Lyon. Widely reported in the media, it was the first incident of large scale public unrest in a French suburb, and marked the first time cars were burned as a protest in France. In 1983, France was experiencing a wave of racist crimes, particularly perpetrated against African immigrants from The Maghreb (for example, the murder of Habib Grimzi, stabbed in a train and then defenestrated, a crime committed by three army soldiers with racist motivations). On 21 March 1983 a police raid led to violent confrontation between a group of young people of Les Minguettes and the police. Demanding the end to police intimidation, a hunger strike began. On 21 June 1983, during a police raid, a police officer shot and seriously injured Toumi Djaïdja, the young president of the association SOS Avenir Minguettes (SOS Minguettes’ Future). In response, the idea of a nonviolent march emerged in order to attempt to reduce tensions between the police and the youth of Les Minguettes. Priest Christian Delorme (called Minguettes’ priest, in French: Curé des Minguettes) and pastor Jean Costil, organised an extended, non-violent march, inspired by Reverend Martin Luther King Jr.'s demonstrations calling for the end of segregation in the United States and those of Mahatma Gandhi for Indian independence from the United Kingdom. They demanded equal rights, and an end to injustice and social inequality.

== Political context ==
In 1983, during the Dreux’s local election, the National Front (French: Front National (FN)) won the first round of the elections, with 16.72% of votes. So far, the National Front was electorally marginal (only 0.35% of votes during the legislative election of 1981). For the second round, the list of the political party of Jacques Chirac, the Rally for the Republic (French: Rassemblement Pour la République (RPR)) decided to merge with the FN list. This merger was approved by Jacques Chirac, who declared: "I would not have been embarrassed at all to vote for the RPR-FN list for the second round. It does not matter to have four municipal councillors from the FN in Dreux, compared to the four communist Ministers in the Council of Ministers". In the right-wing parties, only two leaders disagreed with this alliance: Simone Veil and Bernard Stasi, both from the centre-right Union for French Democracy (French: Union pour la Démocratie française, UDF), a traditional ally of RPR. These elections made the news at this time, as it was the first time a far-right political party won a significant election in France since the beginning of the French Fifth Republic, and also the first time that a major right-wing party made an alliance with a far-right party.

While there is a racist climate in the right-wing parties, a similar stigmatizing climate was experienced in the left-wing parties, especially in the Socialist Party (French: Parti Socialiste (PS)) who governed the country. In 1983, the Socialist Prime Minister of France Pierre Mauroy, the Minister of the Interior Gaston Defferre, and the Minister of Labour Jean Auroux said about the strikers of the CGT's syndicate from the factory of Renault-Billancourt, that they are mainly "immigrants workers", and accused them of being manipulated by "integrists". Prime Minister Pierre Mauroy also declared that the strikers from Renault "are agitated by religious and political group which behave according to criteria that have nothing to do with the French social reality". The Franco-Algerian sociologist Abdelmalek Sayad wrote that "we underestimate how much immigrants workers suffered from the tense atmosphere in work and which painfully affected them".

== Timeline of the demonstration ==
=== First march ===
The first march began in the district of La Cayolle in Marseille on 15 October 1983. Only seventeen persons started the march (nine from Les Minguettes) in a virtual indifference. During the march, more and more marchers joined them. Arriving in the city of Salon-de-Provence, one single person welcomed the marchers, but when arriving in Lyon and Vénissieux during the 15th day (2 October), a thousand people welcomed the group. At Grenoble on 31 October 1983 the permanent marchers’ group totalled 32 persons. On the 36th day, in Strasbourg, they were joined for one day by the Secretary of State delegated to family, to population and immigrants workers issues. The movement was growing more and more. When finally arriving in Paris, the march had lasted exactly 50 days, permanent marchers having covered 1500 km. On 3 December 1983 the march ended with a demonstration in Paris, attended by more than 100,000 people. A delegation was received by the President of the French Republic François Mitterrand. Mitterrand promised a residence and working permit valid for 10 years, a law against racist crimes and a project concerning voting right for foreigners for local elections. This last point, which was already a proposition of Mitterrand's during the presidential election, never came true.

=== Following marches ===
In 1984, a second march was organized by a group from the first march called Convergences 1984, whose spokesman was Farida Belghoul. The march was actively supported by the media, especially by the daily newspapers Le Monde, Libération and Le Matin. The Socialist Party tried to hijack the movement via the anti-racist association SOS Racisme, created by the party. The third march was organized by SOS Racisme, on 28 July 1985, starting from Brussels. Toumi Djaïdja complained of the hijacking, arguing that their movement was aimed to unite all the French regardless of their origins, whereas "SOS Racisme divided the country in two fighting parts: anti-racists and racists".

== 2013 commemoration ==
In 2013, in the city of Vénissieux, many events were organized to commemorate the march.

On 27 November 2013, a movie inspired by the march for equality and against racism titled The Marchers was released in cinemas. The film was directed by the Belgian Nabil Ben Yadir, and stars Oliver Gourmet in the role of the priest Christian Delorme, Tewfik Jallab in the role of Toumi Djaïdja, and also Lubna Azabal, Jamel Debbouze, Charlotte Le Bon, Nader Boussandel, Philippe Nahon, Hafsia Herzi, Vincent Rottiers, M’Barek Belkouk and Frédéric Souterelle.

== See also ==
- Racism in France
- Beur
- SOS Racisme
- 1983 marchers who became members of the European Parliament: Djida Tazdaït (1989-1994), Nora Zaïdi (1989-1994), Alima Boumediene-Thiery (1999-2004)
- 1983 marchers who became French deputies or senators: Alima Boumediene-Thiery (senator, 2004-2011)

== Bibliography ==
- Stéphane Beaud and Olivier Masclet: "Des 'marcheurs' de 1983 aux 'émeutiers' de 2005. Deux générations sociales d’enfants d’immigrés". In: Annales, no. 4, 2006, pp. 809–843.
- Bouzid, La Marche. Traversée de la France profonde, Paris, Sindbad, 1984 ISBN 2-7274-0100-0
- Saïd Bouamama, Dix ans de marche des Beurs.Chronique d'un mouvement avorté, Paris, Éditions Desclée de Brouwer, 1994 ISBN 2-220-03545-X
- Jocelyne Cesari, "De l'immigré au minoritaire : les Maghrébins de France", Revue européenne de migrations internationales, 1994, Vol. 10, Nr. 10-1, pp. 109–126
- Olivier Doubre, "La Marche des Beurs, 25 ans après", Libération, 4 December 2008
- Alec G. Hargreaves, Mark McKinney, Post-colonial cultures in France, Routledge, 1997 ISBN 978-0-415-14487-2
- Adil Jazouli, L’action collective des jeunes Maghrébins de France, Paris, 1986, L'Harmattan ISBN 978-2-85802-688-3
- Kolja Lindner: "25 Jahre 'Marche des Beurs': Kämpfe der Migration im Frankreich der 1980er Jahren und heute". In: Peripherie. Zeitschrift für Politik und Ökonomie in der Dritten Welt, nr. 114/115, 29th year, vol. 2/2009, pp. 304–324.
