= Étupes =

- Commune
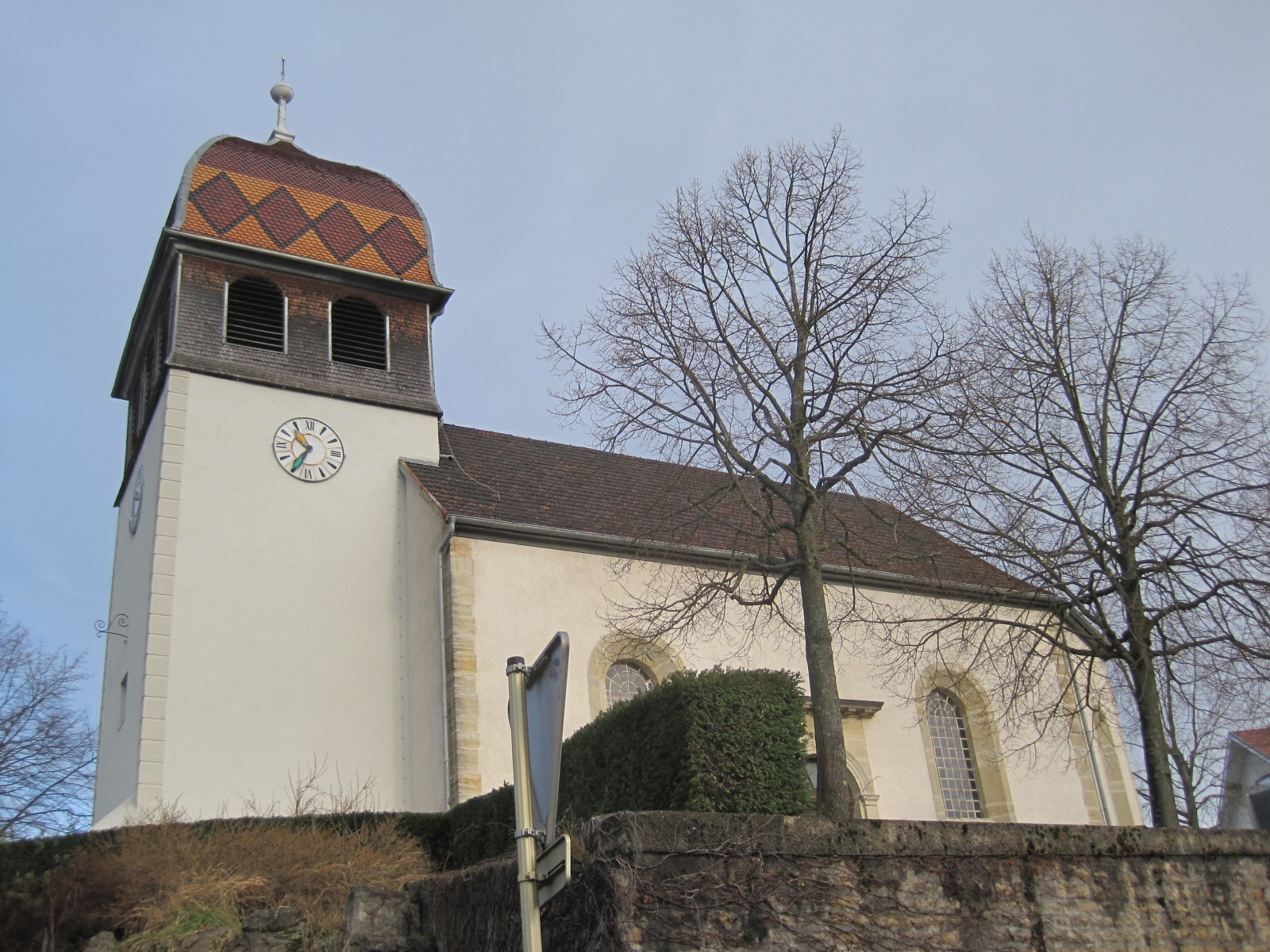
- The church in Étupes

- Coat of arms
- Location of Étupes
- Location within France Location within Bourgogne-Franche-Comté
- Coordinates: 47°30′25″N 6°51′43″E
- Country: France
- Region: Bourgogne-Franche-Comté
- Department: Doubs
- Arrondissement: Montbéliard
- Canton: Bethoncourt
- Intercommunality: Pays de Montbéliard Agglomération

Government
  - Mayor (2020–2026): Philippe Claudel
- Area^{1}: 9.87 km^{2} (3.81 sq mi)
- Highest elevation: 406 m (1,332 ft)
- Lowest elevation: 319 m (1,047 ft)
- Population (2023): 3,689
  - Density: 374/km^{2} (968/sq mi)
- Time zone: UTC+01:00 (CET)
  - Summer (DST): UTC+02:00 (CEST)
- INSEE/Postal code: 25228 /25460
- ^{1} French Land Register data, which excludes lakes, ponds, glaciers > 1 km^{2} (0.386 sq mi or 247 acres) and river estuaries.

Étupes (French pronunciation: [etyp]) is a commune in the Doubs department in the Bourgogne-Franche-Comté region in eastern France.

== Population ==
Historical population
Year	Pop.	±% p.a.
1968	5,198	—
1975	5,250	+0.14%
1982	4,671	−1.66%
1990	3,603	−3.19%
1999	3,543	−0.19%
2007	3,346	−0.71%
2012	3,581	+1.37%
2017	3,727	+0.80%
2023	3,689	−0.17%
Source: INSEE

== See also ==
- Communes of the Doubs department
