= Nommay =

- Commune
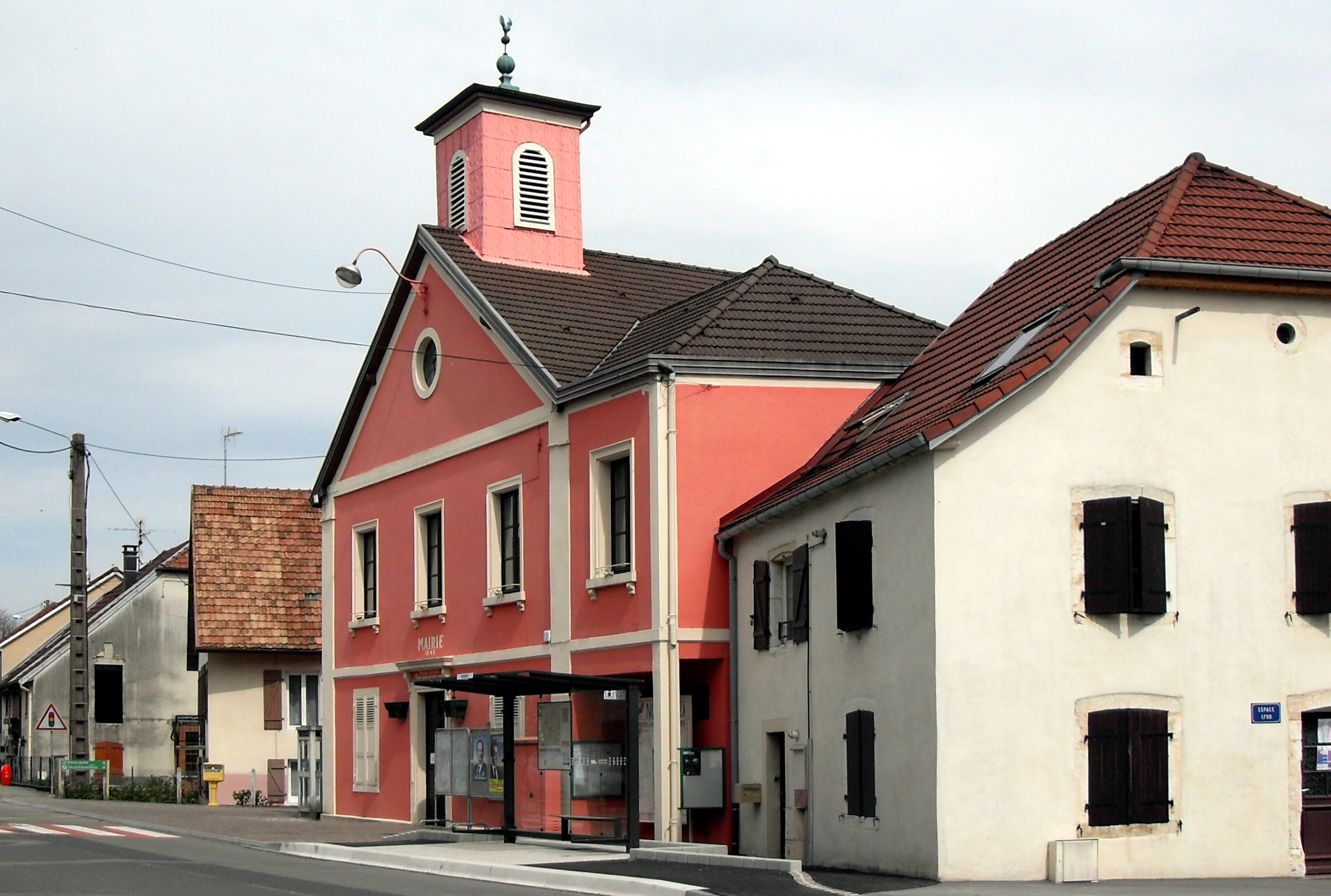
- Town hall
- Location of Nommay
- Location within France Location within Bourgogne-Franche-Comté
- Coordinates: 47°32′19″N 6°50′52″E
- Country: France
- Region: Bourgogne-Franche-Comté
- Department: Doubs
- Arrondissement: Montbéliard
- Canton: Bethoncourt
- Intercommunality: Pays de Montbéliard Agglomération

Government
  - Mayor (2020–2026): Thierry Boillot
- Area^{1}: 3.19 km^{2} (1.23 sq mi)
- Highest elevation: 397 m (1,302 ft)
- Lowest elevation: 320 m (1,050 ft)
- Population (2023): 1,596
  - Density: 500/km^{2} (1,300/sq mi)
- Time zone: UTC+01:00 (CET)
  - Summer (DST): UTC+02:00 (CEST)
- INSEE/Postal code: 25428 /25600
- ^{1} French Land Register data, which excludes lakes, ponds, glaciers > 1 km^{2} (0.386 sq mi or 247 acres) and river estuaries.

Nommay (French pronunciation: [nɔmɛ]) is a commune in the Doubs department in the Bourgogne-Franche-Comté region in eastern France.

== Geography ==
Nommay lies 7 km (4.3 mi) from Sochaux on the edge of the department.

== Population ==
Historical population
Year	Pop.	±% p.a.
1968	1,097	—
1975	1,590	+5.45%
1982	1,635	+0.40%
1990	1,513	−0.96%
1999	1,485	−0.21%
2007	1,580	+0.78%
2012	1,685	+1.30%
2017	1,638	−0.56%
2023	1,596	−0.43%
Source: INSEE

== Sports ==
Stage 8 of the 2012 Tour de France on 8 July raced through Nommay.

The Grand Prix Nommay is a cyclo-cross race held in January which is part of the UCI Cyclo-cross World Cup competition.

== See also ==
- Communes of the Doubs department
