= Dambenois =

- Commune
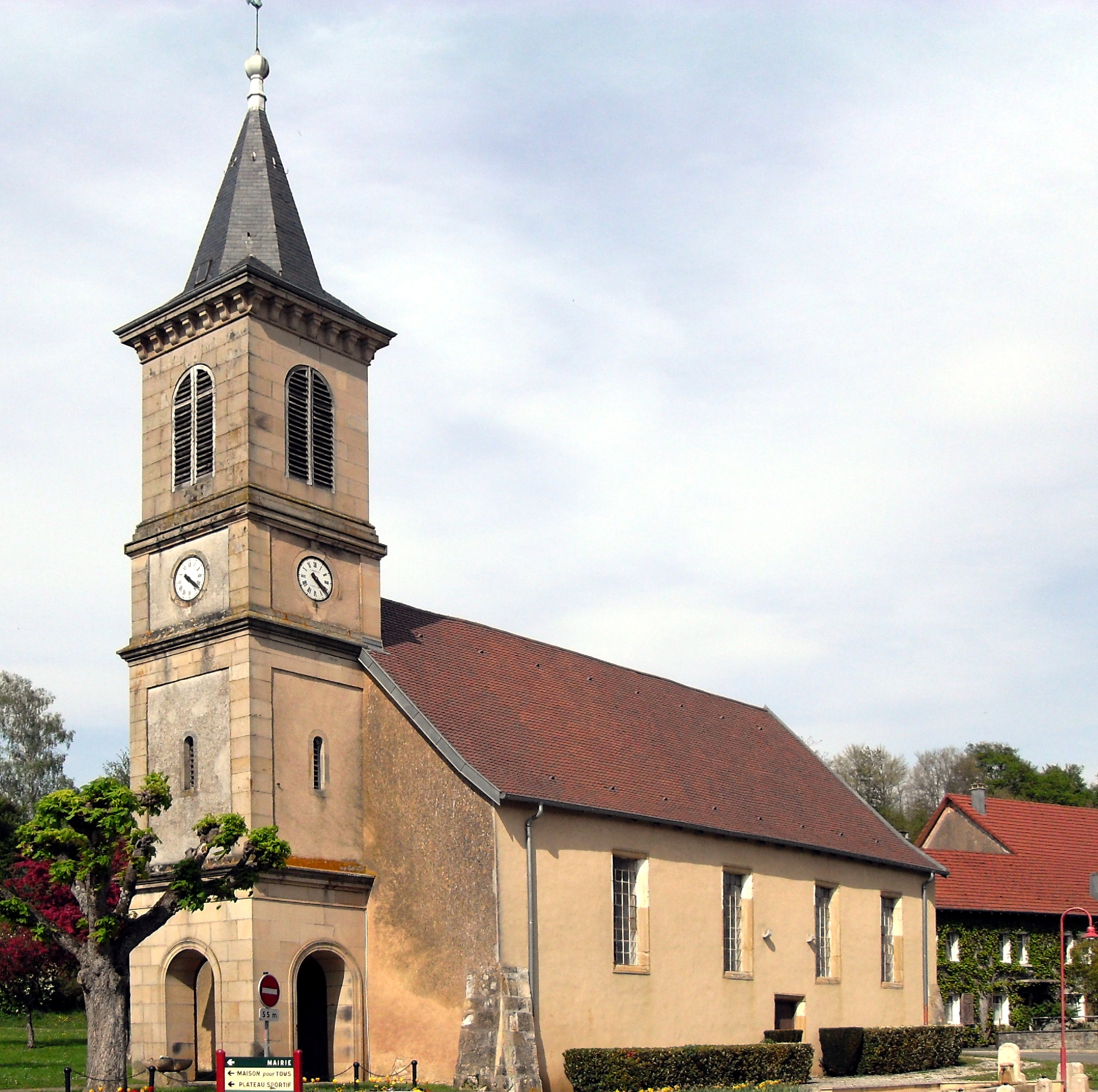
- The Lutheran church in Dambenois

- Coat of arms
- Location of Dambenois
- Location within France Location within Bourgogne-Franche-Comté
- Coordinates: 47°32′42″N 6°52′07″E
- Country: France
- Region: Bourgogne-Franche-Comté
- Department: Doubs
- Arrondissement: Montbéliard
- Canton: Bethoncourt
- Intercommunality: Pays de Montbéliard Agglomération

Government
  - Mayor (2020–2026): Philippe Pourchet
- Area^{1}: 3.28 km^{2} (1.27 sq mi)
- Highest elevation: 427 m (1,401 ft)
- Lowest elevation: 324 m (1,063 ft)
- Population (2023): 733
  - Density: 223/km^{2} (579/sq mi)
- Time zone: UTC+01:00 (CET)
  - Summer (DST): UTC+02:00 (CEST)
- INSEE/Postal code: 25188 /25600
- ^{1} French Land Register data, which excludes lakes, ponds, glaciers > 1 km^{2} (0.386 sq mi or 247 acres) and river estuaries.

Dambenois (French pronunciation: [dɑ̃b(ə)nwa]) is a commune in the Doubs department in the Bourgogne-Franche-Comté region in eastern France.

== Population ==
Historical population
Year	Pop.	±% p.a.
1968	202	—
1975	242	+2.61%
1982	325	+4.30%
1990	607	+8.12%
1999	629	+0.40%
2007	693	+1.22%
2012	775	+2.26%
2017	754	−0.55%
2023	733	−0.47%
Source: INSEE

== See also ==
- Communes of the Doubs department
