= Chagey =

- Commune
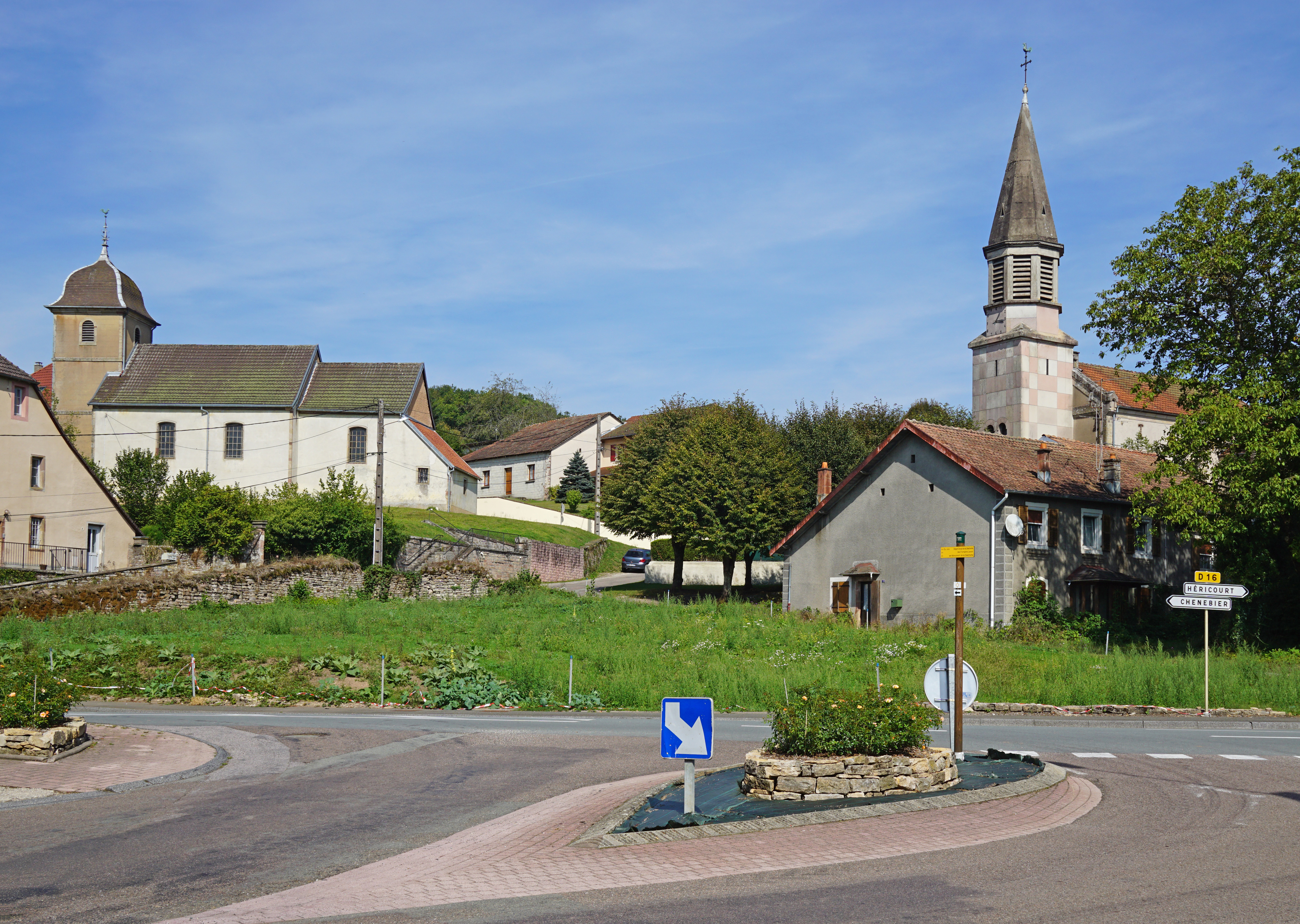
- The churches in Chagey

- Coat of arms
- Location of Chagey
- Location within France Location within Bourgogne-Franche-Comté
- Coordinates: 47°36′46″N 6°44′09″E
- Country: France
- Region: Bourgogne-Franche-Comté
- Department: Haute-Saône
- Arrondissement: Lure
- Canton: Héricourt-1
- Intercommunality: CC pays d'Héricourt

Government
  - Mayor (2020–2026): Nicolas Jouffray
- Area^{1}: 6.99 km^{2} (2.70 sq mi)
- Highest elevation: 489 m (1,604 ft)
- Lowest elevation: 337 m (1,106 ft)
- Population (2023): 596
  - Density: 85.3/km^{2} (221/sq mi)
- Time zone: UTC+01:00 (CET)
  - Summer (DST): UTC+02:00 (CEST)
- INSEE/Postal code: 70116 /70400
- ^{1} French Land Register data, which excludes lakes, ponds, glaciers > 1 km^{2} (0.386 sq mi or 247 acres) and river estuaries.

Chagey (French pronunciation: [ʃaʒɛ]) is a commune in the Haute-Saône department in the region of Bourgogne-Franche-Comté in eastern France.

== Economy ==
An iron foundry was established early in the nineteenth century to refine the ore from the rich mines near Bethoncourt.

== See also ==
- Communes of the Haute-Saône department
