= Nora Zaïdi =

Former Member of the European Parliament

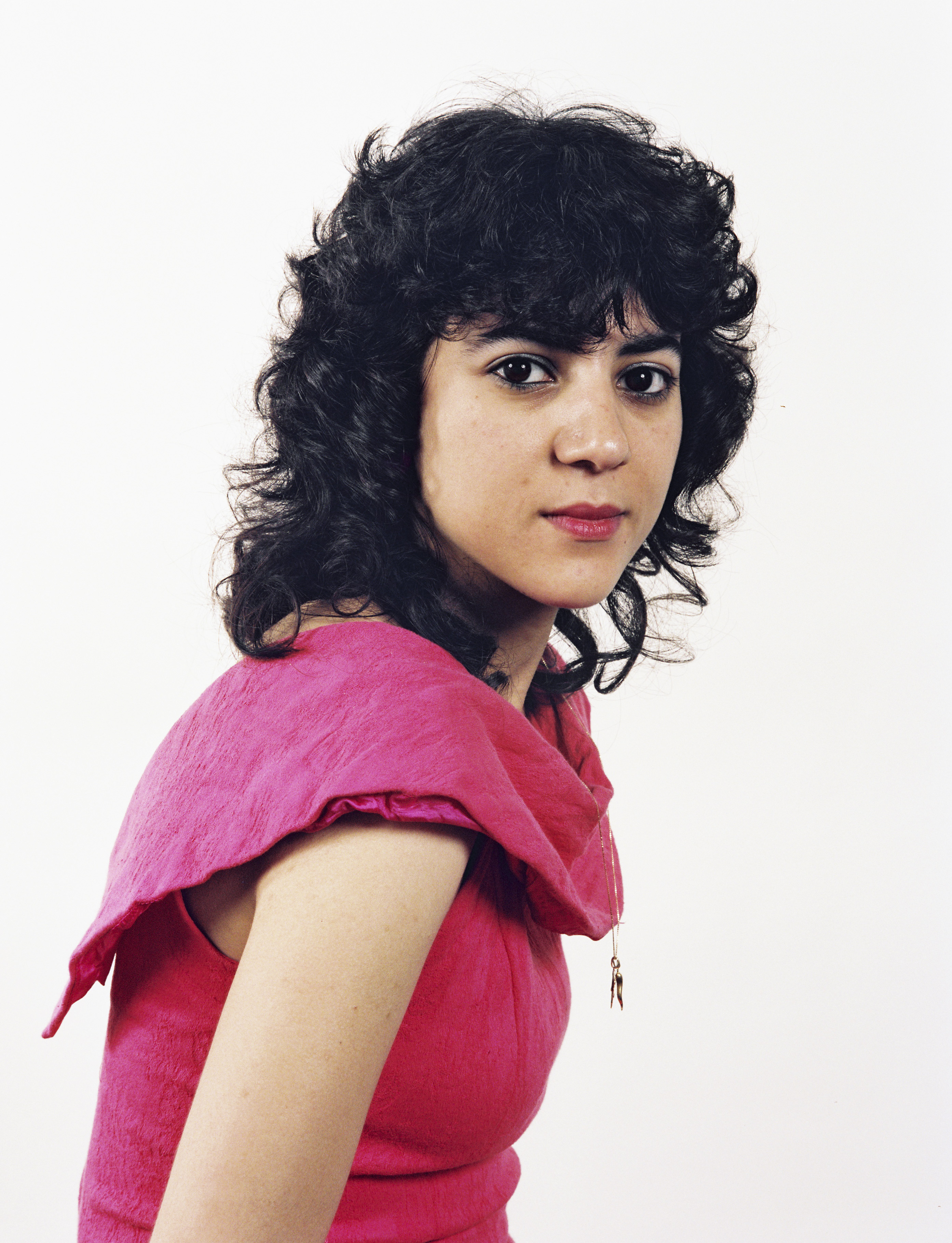
- Nora Zaïdi in 1989

Member of the European Parliament
- In office 1989–1994

Personal details
- Born: June 7, 1965 (age 60) Bethoncourt (French département of Doubs)
- Party: Independent

Nora Zaïdi (Nora Mebrak-Zaïdi), born on July 6, 1965 in Bethoncourt (French département of Doubs) is a French activist who served in the European Parliament from 1989 to 1994.

== SOS Racisme activist ==
Delegate from Montbéliard for the second national congress of SOS Racisme in 1988 at Noisiel (Seine-et-Marne), she declared in an interview broadcast in the main evening news programme of the Second public TV channel about the right of foreigners to vote: "My father arrived 30 years ago in France, today he is retired. He worked, he paid his taxes, things were always decided for him, it is an aberration."

== Member of the European Parliament ==
At the European Parliament election in 1989, she was not yet 24, she has just got a first degree and master in modern language studies and was put at the 20th place on the French Socialist Party list even though she was not a party member: "I never was a member of the Socialist Party, and still I am not. But he (Laurent Fabius) met several delegates from SOS Racisme, and finally chose me." She was elected as the first French MEP with roots in Algeria, alongside Djida Tazdaït, a Lyon activist chosen by the Greens. Eighteen years later, she declared: "I was the youngest. It was exciting for five years. ... I was still a bit lost, far from my background and too young."

== Post-MEP life ==
She was no longer chosen on the 1994 Socialist Party's list, on which there was no eligible candidate with a non European background. She symbolically took part at the eleventh place on the "L'Europe commence à Sarajevo" list led by her colleague MEP and well-known oncologist Léon Schwartzenberg and supported by several prominent French intellectuals, many of them also symbolically candidates, Bernard-Henri Lévy (21st place), Alain Touraine (13th), André Glucksmann (22nd), Pascal Bruckner (19th), or figured in the support committee, like Marek Halter, Susan Sontag, Paul Auster, Nadine Gordimer and the former mayor of Belgrade Bogdan Bogdanović. Bernard-Henri Lévy finally announced the withdrawal of the list, which was estimated between 4 and 12% in the polls, but Léon Schwartzenberg decided to maintain it. It finally got 1.57%.

Nora Zaïdi then completely disappears from the national mediatic and political scene. In 2007 she was a public servant at the National Agency for the reception of foreigners and migrants and a left-wing opposition municipal councillor in Valentigney. She is currently (February 2012) no longer holder of any elected office.
