= Exincourt =

- Commune
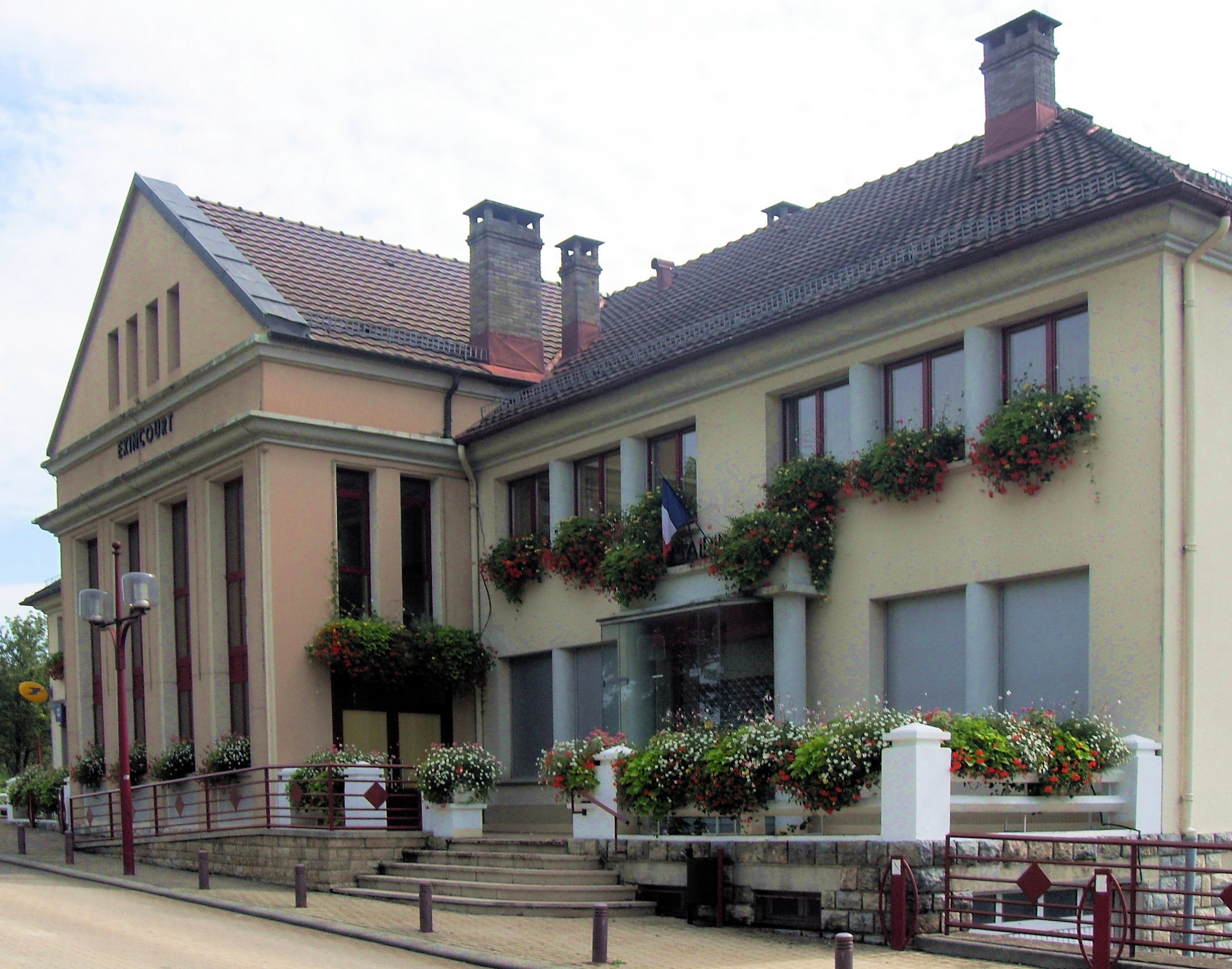
- The town hall in Exincourt

- Coat of arms
- Location of Exincourt
- Location within France Location within Bourgogne-Franche-Comté
- Coordinates: 47°29′54″N 6°50′02″E
- Country: France
- Region: Bourgogne-Franche-Comté
- Department: Doubs
- Arrondissement: Montbéliard
- Canton: Bethoncourt
- Intercommunality: Pays de Montbéliard Agglomération

Government
  - Mayor (2020–2026): Magali Duvernois
- Area^{1}: 3.45 km^{2} (1.33 sq mi)
- Highest elevation: 382 m (1,253 ft)
- Lowest elevation: 317 m (1,040 ft)
- Population (2023): 3,277
  - Density: 950/km^{2} (2,460/sq mi)
- Time zone: UTC+01:00 (CET)
  - Summer (DST): UTC+02:00 (CEST)
- INSEE/Postal code: 25230 /25400
- ^{1} French Land Register data, which excludes lakes, ponds, glaciers > 1 km^{2} (0.386 sq mi or 247 acres) and river estuaries.

Exincourt (French pronunciation: [ɛɡzɛ̃kuʁ]) is a commune in the Doubs department in the Bourgogne-Franche-Comté region in eastern France.

== Population ==
Historical population
Year	Pop.	±% p.a.
1968	4,317	—
1975	4,185	−0.44%
1982	3,776	−1.46%
1990	3,445	−1.14%
1999	3,309	−0.45%
2007	3,230	−0.30%
2012	3,172	−0.36%
2017	3,222	+0.31%
2023	3,277	+0.28%
Source: INSEE

== See also ==
- Communes of the Doubs department
