= Djida Tazdaït =

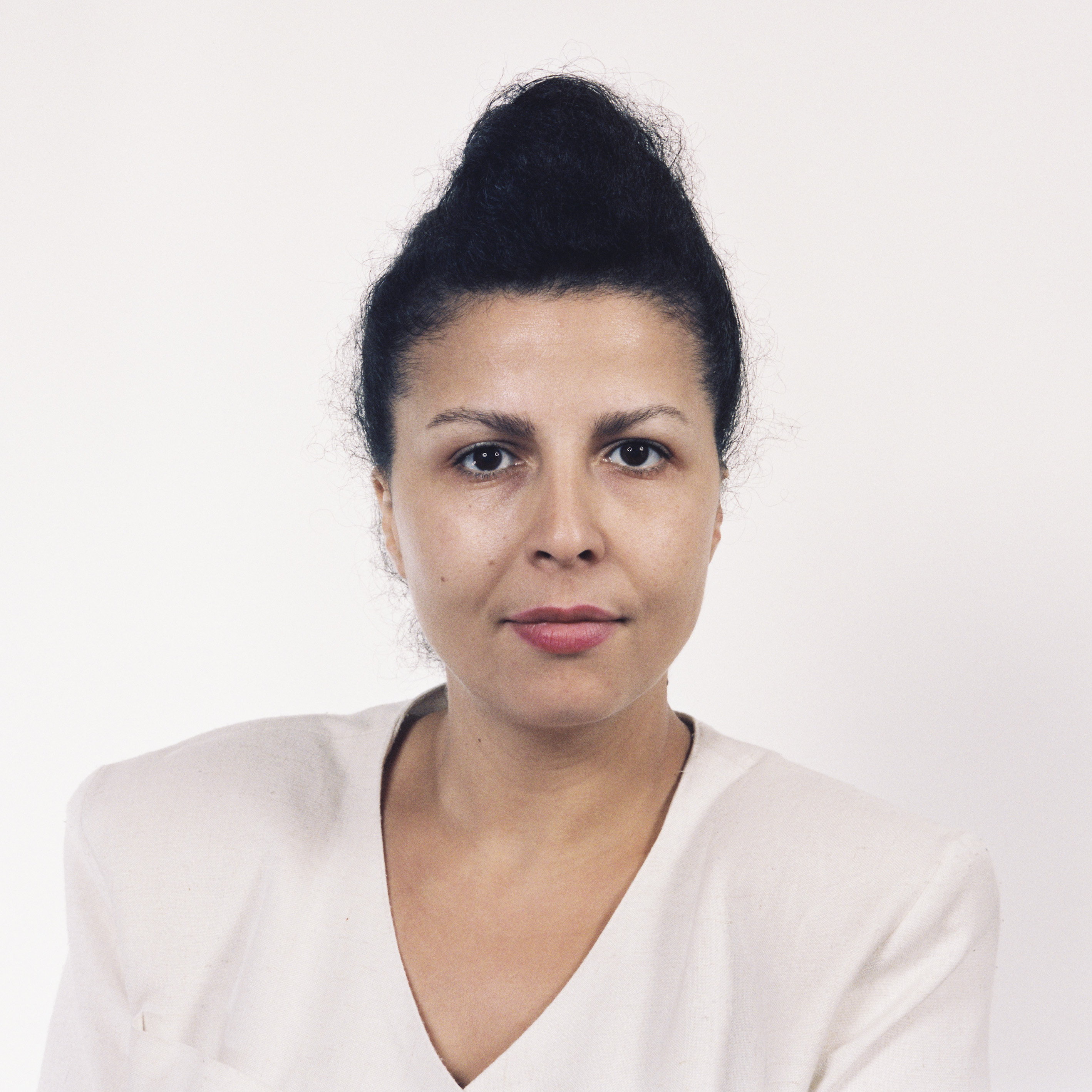

Member of the European Parliament
- In office 1989–1994

Personal details
- Born: 8 April 1957 (age 68) Timri Tala-Tazert (French Algeria)
- Party: Independent (now French Radical Party)

Djida Tazdaït (born 8 April 1957 in Timri Tala-Tazert, French Algeria) is a French activist who served as a Member of the European Parliament (MEP) from 1989 to 1994.

At the age of 7 she arrived with her family in a Lyon's banlieue slum.

In 1983 she took part into the March for Equality and against Racism, and in 1985 she was one of the founders of the association Young Arabs of Lyon and Suburbs (Jeunes Arabes de Lyon et banlieue).

In 1989 she was an independent candidate on the French Greens list for the European Parliament election, first French MEP with roots in Algeria, alongside Nora Zaïdi, a SOS Racisme activist chosen by the French Socialist Party. Both had never been members of any political party nor had been candidate to any election before. She didn't respect the tourniquet rule by which Green MEPs resigned after mid-term to enable other candidates to seat. In 1994 she was no longer candidate for the European elections. In 1995 she was candidate on a Greens list for the municipal elections in Vénissieux.

Since 2003 she is a member of the centre-right French Radical Party, then an associate party of Nicolas Sarkozy's Union for a Popular Movement (UMP). She was candidate for the municipal and cantonal elections in March 2008 but didn't get elected. She was candidate in Lyon for the June 2012 French Parliamentary elections and got 0.5% of the votes. In March 2014 she was elected to the municipal council of Lyon on the UMP list (opposition).
