= Canton of Bethoncourt =

Canton in Doubs department, eastern France

Coordinates: 47.54°N 6.80°E

The canton of Bethoncourt is an administrative division of the Doubs department, eastern France. It was created at the French canton reorganisation which came into effect in March 2015. Its seat is in Bethoncourt.

It consists of the following communes:

1. Allenjoie
2. Bethoncourt
3. Brognard
4. Dambenois
5. Étupes
6. Exincourt
7. Fesches-le-Châtel
8. Grand-Charmont
9. Nommay
10. Sochaux
11. Vieux-Charmont
