= Allenjoie =

- Commune
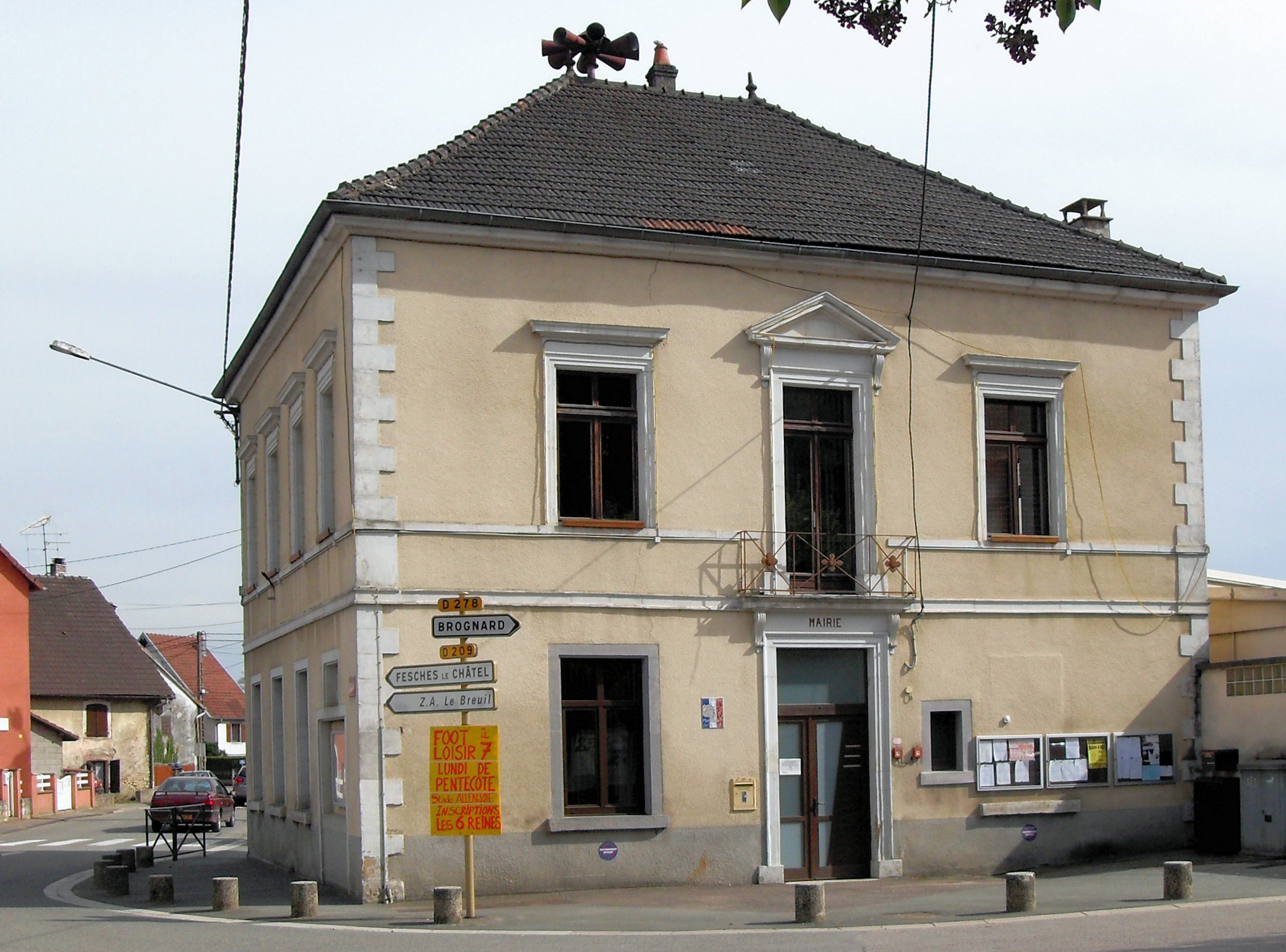
- The town hall in Allenjoie

- Coat of arms
- Location of Allenjoie
- Location within France Location within Bourgogne-Franche-Comté
- Coordinates: 47°32′08″N 6°53′52″E
- Country: France
- Region: Bourgogne-Franche-Comté
- Department: Doubs
- Arrondissement: Montbéliard
- Canton: Bethoncourt
- Intercommunality: Pays de Montbéliard Agglomération

Government
  - Mayor (2020–2026): Jean Fried
- Area^{1}: 6.56 km^{2} (2.53 sq mi)
- Highest elevation: 417 m (1,368 ft)
- Lowest elevation: 320 m (1,050 ft)
- Population (2023): 719
  - Density: 110/km^{2} (284/sq mi)
- Time zone: UTC+01:00 (CET)
  - Summer (DST): UTC+02:00 (CEST)
- INSEE/Postal code: 25011 /25490
- ^{1} French Land Register data, which excludes lakes, ponds, glaciers > 1 km^{2} (0.386 sq mi or 247 acres) and river estuaries.

Allenjoie (French pronunciation: [alɑ̃ʒwa]) is a commune in the Doubs department in the Bourgogne-Franche-Comté region in eastern France.

== Population ==
Historical population
Year	Pop.	±% p.a.
1968	461	—
1975	661	+5.28%
1982	649	−0.26%
1990	578	−1.44%
1999	583	+0.10%
2007	682	+1.98%
2012	751	+1.95%
2017	735	−0.43%
2023	719	−0.37%
Source: INSEE

== See also ==
- Communes of the Doubs department
