= Alima Boumediene-Thiery =

French politician (born 1956)

Member of the French Senate for Paris
- In office 26 September 2004 – 30 July 2011

Member of the European Parliament
- In office 20 July 1999 – 19 July 2004

Personal details
- Born: 24 July 1956 (age 69) Argenteuil, France
- Party: The Greens; Socialist Party; Ensemble!

Alima Boumediene-Thiery (born 24 July 1956) is a former Member of the European Parliament (1999–2004) and former member of the Senate of France (2004–2011), representing the city of Paris. She was previously a member of the French Green party.

== Biography ==
=== Childhood ===
Boumediene-Thiery was born into a North African family in Argenteuil, an outer banlieue of Paris, in 1956.

=== Activism ===
Prior to entering politics, she was an activist and was an organizer of the 1983 March for Equality and against Racism. She founded Expression Maghrébine au Féminin (EMAF) in 1985 to promote the cultural contributions by women from the Maghreb. She hosted a program, Féminin Pluriel, in the 1990s on a community radio station. She also unsuccessfully attempted to get a radio frequency for her association in 1992.

=== Local office ===
In 1995, she was elected to munincipal office in Argenteuil as an independent running on a left-wing coalition's list. She joined The Greens in 1998.

=== European Parliament ===
In 1999, Boumediene-Thiery was elected a member of the European Parliament with her mandate ending in March 2004. In the 2004 European Parliament election, she was not reelected despite being second on the Green Party's list in Île-de-France behind Alain Lipietz.

=== French Senate ===
In 26 September 2004, she was elected as a member of the French Senate on a left-wing coalition list in Paris.

On June 30, 2010, Alima Boumediene-Thiery took part in a boycott of israeli products at a supermarket in Montigny-lès-Cormeilles. She was subsequently charged with "incitement to discrimination on the grounds of national origin". She received support from numerous quarters, including Algerian parliamentarians, Jewish members of the UJFP, and the AMF (Association of Moroccans in France). Boumediene-Thiery was the only political figure to speak out publicly on the Said Bourarach case.

Furthermore, citing her status as a former Senator (EELV), she applied for admission to the Val-d'Oise bar. Her application was initially rejected; however, she challenged this decision in court and won the appeal.

On May 26, 2011 while sitting in the French Senate, Boumediene-Thiery wrote to the Minister of Education, Luc Chatel, asking him to intervene on behalf of her son, whose application for a boarding place at a public middle school in Paris had been rejected on the basis of “social criteria" and “negative opinion from the social worker.” Alima Boumediene-Thiery complained in her letter that a senator in her situation needed state assistance to make ends meet. At the time, a senator’s net monthly salary was €5,400, with an additional €6,240 in non-taxable allowances, meaning her monthly income was €11,645.94, in addition to taxi expenses paid for by the Senate.

=== Defeat and later career ===
In 25 September 2011 she ran for reelection in Val-d'Oise, running while suspended by the Greens running as an independent. She was defeated with 4% of the vote.

In 2014, she joined the new Ensemble! French political party. In 2019, she was selected to lead a left-wing list in the Argenteuil local elections. The list was broke apart before the vote.
