= Bethoncourt =

- Commune
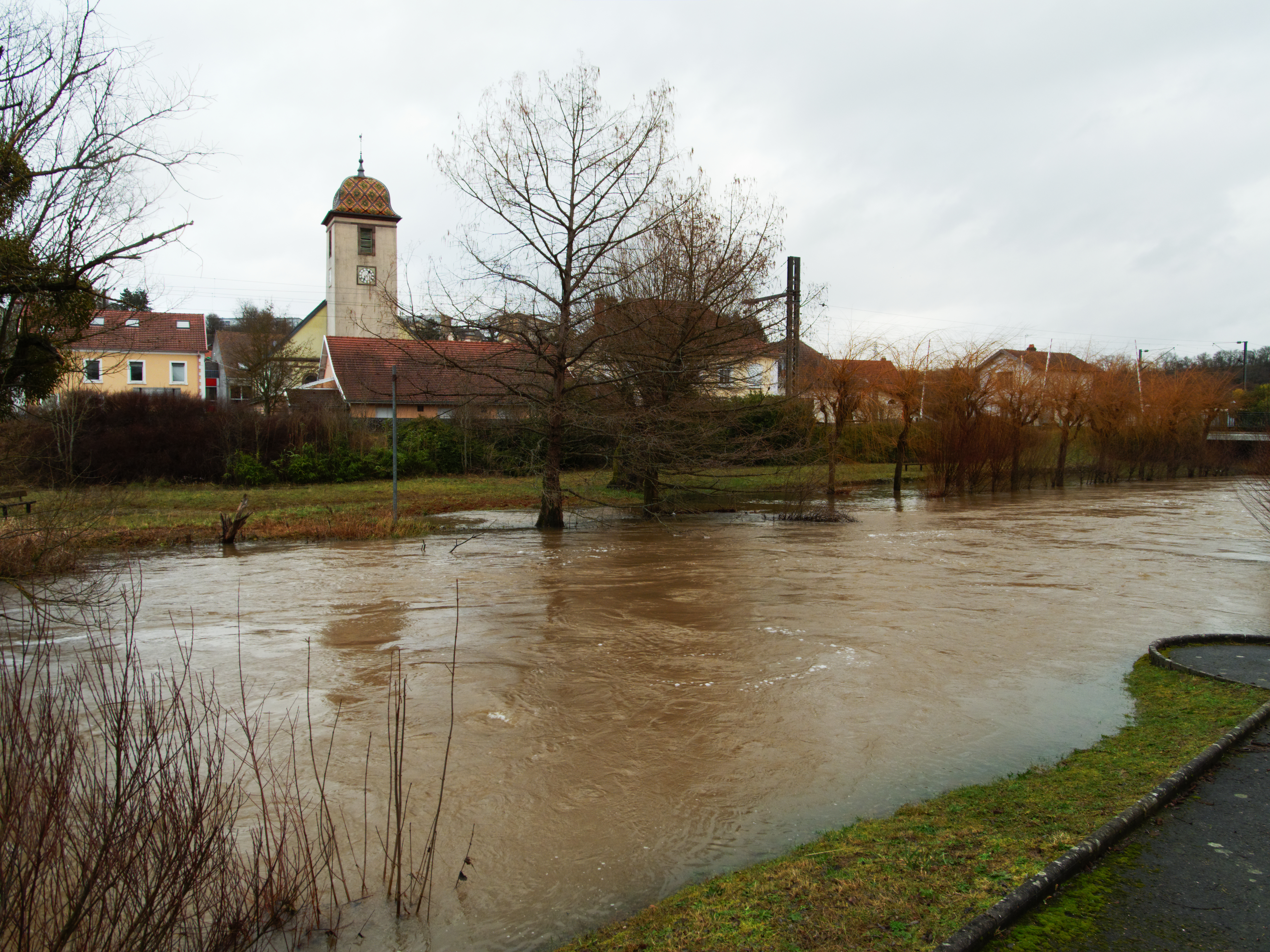
- The overflowing Lizaine river in Bethoncourt

- Coat of arms
- Location of Bethoncourt
- Location within France Location within Bourgogne-Franche-Comté
- Coordinates: 47°32′07″N 6°48′17″E
- Country: France
- Region: Bourgogne-Franche-Comté
- Department: Doubs
- Arrondissement: Montbéliard
- Canton: Bethoncourt
- Intercommunality: Pays de Montbéliard Agglomération

Government
  - Mayor (2020–2026): Jean André
- Area^{1}: 6.54 km^{2} (2.53 sq mi)
- Highest elevation: 410 m (1,350 ft)
- Lowest elevation: 315 m (1,033 ft)
- Population (2023): 5,308
  - Density: 812/km^{2} (2,100/sq mi)
- Time zone: UTC+01:00 (CET)
  - Summer (DST): UTC+02:00 (CEST)
- INSEE/Postal code: 25057 /25200
- ^{1} French Land Register data, which excludes lakes, ponds, glaciers > 1 km^{2} (0.386 sq mi or 247 acres) and river estuaries.

Bethoncourt (French pronunciation: [bətɔ̃kuʁ]) is a commune in the Doubs department in the Bourgogne-Franche-Comté region in eastern France.

== Geography ==
Bethoncourt lies north of Montbéliard, close to the border with the Haute-Saône department and the Territoire de Belfort and very near the Swiss border. The Lizaine, formerly called the Luzine, flows through it.

== History ==
In the Franco-Prussian War, many citizens of Bethoncourt fled from the Prussians across the border to Switzerland, where many had relatives in the Swiss Jura region.

== Population ==
In the early twentieth century, Bethoncourt grew from a small town into a thriving city of nearly 11,000 inhabitants. Since 1975, however, it has shrunk to just over half that size.

Historical population

Year	Pop.	±% p.a.
1800	426	—
1851	713	+1.02%
1896	891	+0.50%
1921	1,026	+0.57%
1946	1,598	+1.79%
1954	1,928	+2.37%
1962	6,442	+16.28%
1968	10,996	+9.32%

Year	Pop.	±% p.a.
1975	10,592	−0.53%
1982	9,751	−1.17%
1990	7,448	−3.31%
1999	6,848	−0.93%
2007	6,098	−1.44%
2012	5,885	−0.71%
2017	5,647	−0.82%
2023	5,308	−1.03%

Source: EHESS and INSEE (1968-2023)

== Economy ==
Bethoncourt possessed rich iron mines that provided ore for all the foundries in the region in such towns as Chagey and Audincourt.

Shafts from 1 to 3 meters in diameter were dug to a depth of 40 meters. These led to horizontal galleries that allowed extraction of the mineral.

The ore was brought to a washing station (still extant), a sort of lock on the Lizaine between Bethoncourt and Bussurel. There the nodules of iron were washed out of the soil matrix.

The workers, mostly peasants, were well paid for this difficult and dangerous work. The galoshes (Gollutch) they wore became the nickname for the residents of Bethoncourt.

In the mid-nineteenth century, an important segment of the population consisted of highly skilled watchmakers. However, the entire Jura watchmaking industry was hit hard by the importation of cheap factory-made American watches, which were of equal or higher quality.

In the 1930s, up to 600 workers were employed in the textile mill.

== Transportation ==
Bethoncourt lies on the Strasbourg-Lyon line of the SNCF and on departmental highway D438.

== Twin towns ==
Bethoncourt is twinned with:

- Silmiouglou, Burkina Faso

== See also ==
- Communes of the Doubs department
