= Grand-Charmont =

- Commune
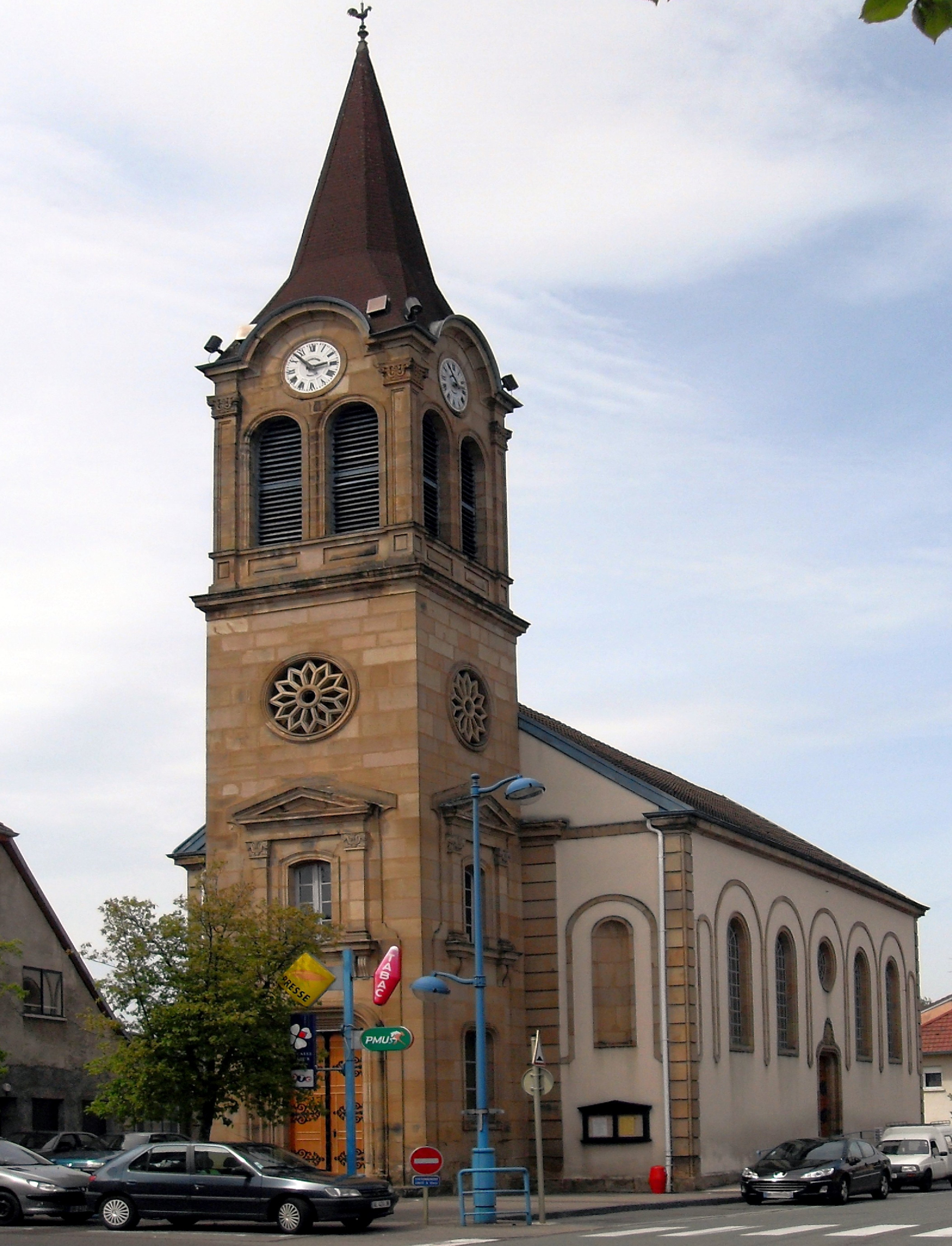
- The Lutheran church in Grand-Charmont

- Coat of arms
- Location of Grand-Charmont
- Location within France Location within Bourgogne-Franche-Comté
- Coordinates: 47°31′41″N 6°49′28″E
- Country: France
- Region: Bourgogne-Franche-Comté
- Department: Doubs
- Arrondissement: Montbéliard
- Canton: Bethoncourt
- Intercommunality: Pays de Montbéliard Agglomération

Government
  - Mayor (2024–2026): Aurélie Dzierzynski
- Area^{1}: 4.56 km^{2} (1.76 sq mi)
- Highest elevation: 425 m (1,394 ft)
- Lowest elevation: 324 m (1,063 ft)
- Population (2023): 5,873
  - Density: 1,290/km^{2} (3,340/sq mi)
- Time zone: UTC+01:00 (CET)
  - Summer (DST): UTC+02:00 (CEST)
- INSEE/Postal code: 25284 /25200
- ^{1} French Land Register data, which excludes lakes, ponds, glaciers > 1 km^{2} (0.386 sq mi or 247 acres) and river estuaries.

Grand-Charmont (French pronunciation: [ɡʁɑ̃ ʃaʁmɔ̃]) is a commune in the Doubs department in the Bourgogne-Franche-Comté region in eastern France.

== Population ==
Historical population
Year	Pop.	±% p.a.
1968	7,201	—
1975	7,922	+1.37%
1982	7,139	−1.48%
1990	5,605	−2.98%
1999	5,104	−1.03%
2007	4,850	−0.64%
2012	5,319	+1.86%
2017	5,699	+1.39%
2023	5,873	+0.50%
Source: INSEE

== See also ==
- Communes of the Doubs department
