= Vieux-Charmont =

- Commune
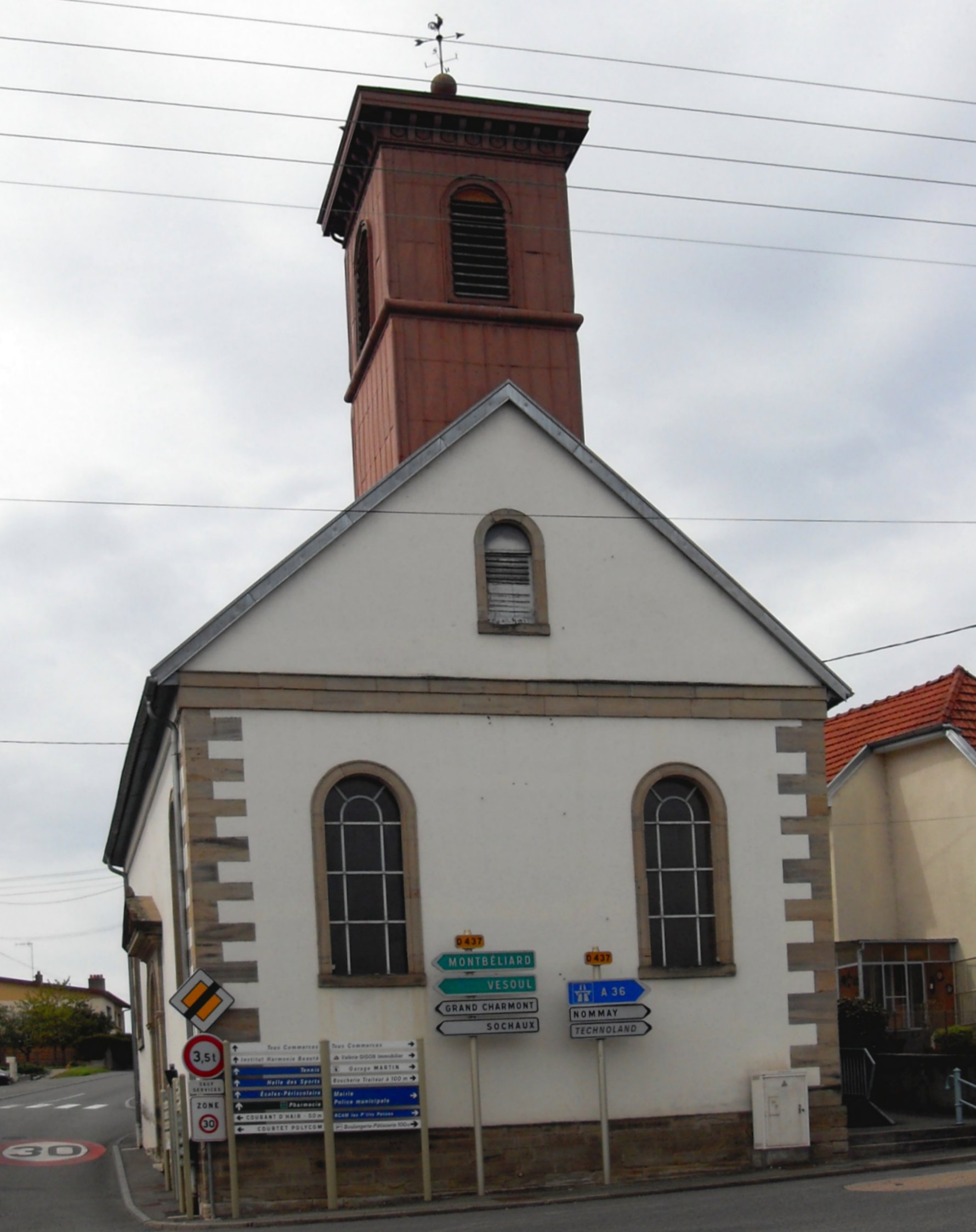
- The Lutheran church in Vieux-Charmont

- Coat of arms
- Location of Vieux-Charmont
- Location within France Location within Bourgogne-Franche-Comté
- Coordinates: 47°31′32″N 6°50′23″E
- Country: France
- Region: Bourgogne-Franche-Comté
- Department: Doubs
- Arrondissement: Montbéliard
- Canton: Bethoncourt
- Intercommunality: Pays de Montbéliard Agglomération

Government
  - Mayor (2020–2026): Henri-Francis Dufour
- Area^{1}: 2.51 km^{2} (0.97 sq mi)
- Highest elevation: 367 m (1,204 ft)
- Lowest elevation: 318 m (1,043 ft)
- Population (2023): 2,786
  - Density: 1,110/km^{2} (2,870/sq mi)
- Time zone: UTC+01:00 (CET)
  - Summer (DST): UTC+02:00 (CEST)
- INSEE/Postal code: 25614 /25600
- ^{1} French Land Register data, which excludes lakes, ponds, glaciers > 1 km^{2} (0.386 sq mi or 247 acres) and river estuaries.

Vieux-Charmont (French pronunciation: [vjø ʃaʁmɔ̃]) is a commune in the Doubs department in the Bourgogne-Franche-Comté region in eastern France.

== Population ==
Historical population
Year	Pop.	±% p.a.
1968	2,790	—
1975	3,167	+1.83%
1982	2,680	−2.36%
1990	2,571	−0.52%
1999	2,509	−0.27%
2007	2,487	−0.11%
2012	2,605	+0.93%
2017	2,744	+1.05%
2023	2,786	+0.25%
Source: INSEE

== See also ==
- Communes of the Doubs department
