= Farida Belghoul =

Algerian-French writer

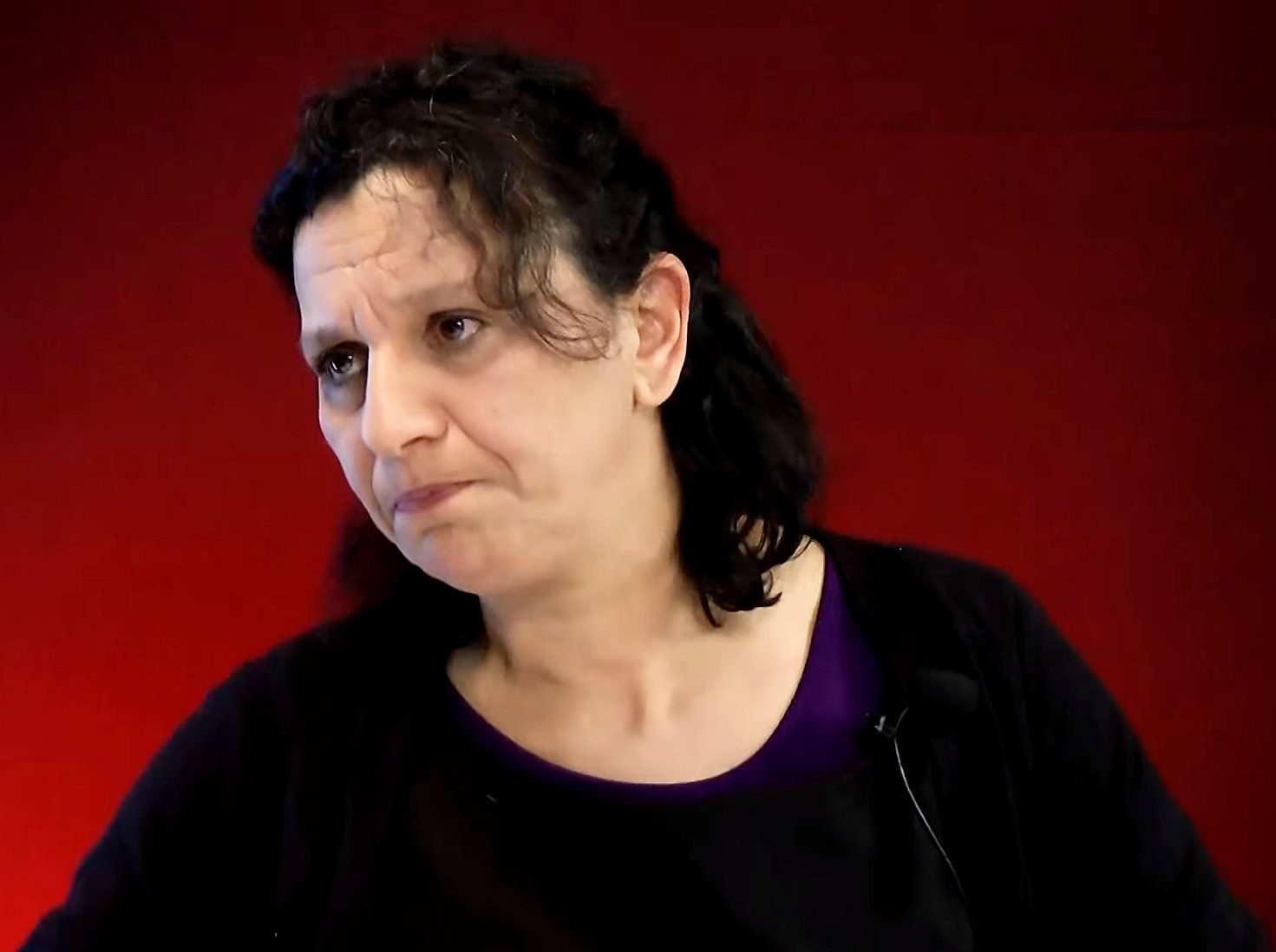
- Belghoul in 2014
- Born: 8 March 1958; France
- Occupations: Writer, activist
- Writing career
- Notable work: Georgette

Farida Belghoul (born 1958) is a French author of Algerian descent who was raised in France. She was the main spokesperson for the second March for Equality and Against Racism which took place throughout France in 1984. Her novel Georgette! was published in 1986.

== Opposition to the "Theory of Gender" ==
Belghoul has opposed since at least October 2013 the teaching of gender theory to schoolchildren. She is troubled by the programme in the national elementary curriculum called L'ABCD de l'égalité (The Basics of Equality), which was launched in September 2013 and whose main aim is to "fight gender stereotypes at school".

Belghoul launched her absenteeism protest programme on 13 December 2013, by which she hoped, by her programme of non-cooperation, to pressure the authorities. The first absentee day was 24 January 2014 and caused the Minister of Education, Vincent Peillon, to answer questions in the Assemblée Nationale on 28 January, during which time he stated categorically:

Ce que nous faisons ce n'est pas la théorie du genre, je la refuse, c'est promouvoir les valeurs de la République et l'égalité entre les hommes et les femmes.

However, the Subcommittee on Education on 28 February 2013 had voted in favour of an amendment proposed by Martine Faure, favoured by Yves Durand, Martine Martinel and Marie-George Buffet among others, that replaced the biological concepts of "sex", with the sociological concepts of "gender".

On 11 May 2014, the anniversary of Saint Jeanne d'Arc, Belghoul and a French Catholic pressure group, Civitas, demonstrated together at a park in Paris. The alliance grouped opponents of the mariage pour tous policy.

In January 2014, Belghoul also called for women to wear skirts, and leave trousers to men, in the so-called "year of the skirt".

== Bibliography ==
- Georgette! : roman. Paris: Barrault, 1986.
- recent productions:
  - REID
  - our school at home: a film by Samia Chala

== Sources ==
- McIlvanney, Siobhan. “The articulation of beur female identity in the works of Farida Belghoul, Ferrudja Kessas and Soraya Nini.” In Women’s Writing in Contemporary France: New Writers, New Literatures in the 1990s. Manchester: Manchester University Press, 2002. 130–141.
- McKinney, Mark. "Le jeu de piste: Tracking clues to the emergence of Maghrebi-French literature in Farida Belghoul's Georgette!" In Susan Ireland et Patrice J. Proulx, dirs., Immigrant Narratives in Contemporary France. Westport, CT: Greenwood Press, 2001. 105–115.
