= Pierre Fédida =

French psychoanalyst

- Born: 30 October 1934; Lyon, France
- Died: 1 November 2002 (aged 68); Paris, France
- Scientific career
- Fields: Psychology, psychoanalysis, philosophy
- Workplaces: University of Lyon; University of Paris; Paris Diderot University

Pierre Fédida (30 October 1934 – 1 November 2002) was a French psychoanalyst.

== Biography ==
Fédida was born in Lyon to a Sephardic Jewish father and a Catholic mother. While working on his agrégation in philosophy, which he completed in 1962, Fédida simultaneously trained as a psychologist in Lyon and Montpellier. In 1960–1962 he worked as a clinical psychologist at an army hospital in Lyon, after which he taught philosophy and educational psychology at the École normale supérieure de Lyon. He then taught psychology at the University of Lyon until 1967, when he became a senior lecturer at the Sorbonne. Following the civil unrest of May 1968, he took part in the founding in the UFR of Human Clinical Sciences at Paris Diderot University. Fédida remained active there for the rest of his career; he was made a full professor in 1979 and held several important roles, including as university vice-president and director of doctoral studies.

Fédida was trained in phenomenological and existentialist thought; he studied under Ludwig Binswanger, and his early works bear the influence of Husserl, Heidegger, and German-language psychiatry. His clinical psychotherapeutic practice led him to a progressive shift towards Freudian psychoanalysis. A member of the Association psychanalytique de France (APF), which also included analysts such as Daniel Lagache, Didier Anzieu, and Jean Laplanche, Fédida's work is considered to have been marked by an openness to distinct psychoanalytic approaches, including those of Jacques Lacan in France, and those of English-language analysts such as Harold Searles, D. W. Winnicott, and Frances Tustin. He died in Paris.

== Bibliography ==
- Dictionnaire abrégé, comparatif et critique des notions principales de la psychanalyse, Paris: Larousse, 1974.
- Le Concept et la violence, Paris: Union générale d'éditions, 1977.
- Corps du vide et espace de séance, Paris: J.-P. Delarge, 1977.
- L'Absence, Paris: Gallimard, 1978.
- Crise et contre-transfert, Paris: Presses universitaires de France, 1992.
- Le Site de l'étranger. La Situation psychanalytique, Paris: Presses universitaires de France, 1995.
- Par où commence le corps humain. Retour sur la régression, Paris: Presses universitaires de France, 2000.
- Des Bienfaits de la dépression. Éloge de la psychothérapie, Paris: Odile Jacob, 2001.
- Psychopathologie de l'expérience du corps, with Rosine Debray and Christophe Dejours, Paris: Dunod, 2002.

=== In English ===
- Psychopathologies of the Living. Selected Essays of Pierre Fédida, ed. Patrick ffrench and Nigel Saint, trans. Timothy Mathews and Anne-Marie Smith-Di Biasio, London/New York: Routledge, 2025.
