= Fodé Sylla (politician) =

French politician

Member of the European Parliament
- In office 1999–2004

President of SOS Racisme
- In office 1992–1999
- Preceded by: Harlem Désir
- Succeeded by: Malek Boutih

Personal details
- Born: 23 January 1963 (age 63) Thiès, Senegal
- Party: PRG

Fodé Sylla (born 23 January 1963 in Thiès, Senegal) is a French politician who was a Member of the European Parliament (MEP) for France from 1999 to 2004.

== Early life ==
He spent his youth in Sablé-sur-Sarthe, a French rural commune, the first one inside metropolitan France that ever had a Black mayor, Raphaël Élizé, in 1929–1940. He has a BA in History and a M.A in Political Science and wrote several books, e.g. Qui a peur de Malcolm X ? (Who is afraid of Malcolm X ?) and Préférence nationale : un Apartheid à la française (National preference, a French apartheid).

== SOS Racism ==
He was the second president of the French anti-racist organisation SOS Racisme between 1992 and 1999.

== Political career ==
Although close to the French Socialist Party as a president of its near-affiliated organisation SOS Racism, he was selected as a non-party candidate by the French Communist Party for the 1999 European Elections. After his mandate, in 2006, he joined the center-left Radical Party of the Left under which label he unsuccessfully candidated for the 2007 legislative elections.

Preceded by Harlem Désir	President of SOS Racism; 1992-1999	Succeeded by Malek Boutih
