= SOS Racisme =

Movement of NGOs describing themselves as anti-racist

Logo of the association. The slogan means "don't touch my friend"

SOS Racisme (French pronunciation: [ɛsɔɛs ʁasism]) is a politically left-wing international movement of anti-racist NGOs. The oldest chapter of SOS Racisme was founded in 1984 in France, and it has counterparts in several other European countries or regions. Its Norwegian branch, which claimed to be both the largest chapter of SOS Racisme and the largest anti-racist organisation in Europe, was controversial for its strong Maoist stance and for defrauding the government, resulting in the organisation's conviction for fraud and its bankruptcy as well as criminal proceedings against its leaders.

== Activities ==
SOS Racisme's stated goal is to fight racial discrimination. Often the plaintiff in discrimination trials, the organization also offers support to immigrants and racial minorities that are facing discrimination. It is also heavily involved in protesting and publicising examples of discrimination in society and in the law.

SOS Racisme uses testing as a method to expose racial discrimination by finding where racial double standards may exist. For example, two identical work applications might be submitted to a prospective employer, with the only difference being the name of the applicants. One with a name of French origin, the other with a name suggestive of an immigrant. Other testings could take place at a realty office, where two people whose only difference is race would both look for housing, etc.. This tactic has led to numerous lawsuits for racial discrimination, especially against nightclubs.

== History ==
SOS Racisme was created one year after the March for Equality and Against Racism, considered to be the first national anti-racist movement in France, which took place in 1983. Most participants were young people from North African immigration, who protested against racist crimes. In 1984, a second march was organised, led by Farida Belghoul. That same year, the socialist government helped to create SOS Racisme, a more moderate anti-racist organisation, without the main leaders of the two marches, who denounced a "hijacking" of the movement by the Socialist Party. The UEJF, a Jewish student organisation, also played an important part in the creation of SOS Racisme.

The guiding principle of the association, brotherhood, is represented by the yellow hand logo upon which is written Touche pas à mon pote. This slogan, which means "Hands off my pal!", was adopted upon the creation of the organization in October 1984. SOS Racisme benefitted from open support from the PS in the 1980s, and many members of SOS Racisme became high-level PS politicians: Harlem Désir, president of SOS Racisme from 1984 to 1992, is today a Member of the European Parliament for the PS; Fodé Sylla, president of SOS Racisme from 1992 to 1999 was at that time a member of the PS (and later a Member of the European Parliament for the Communist Party, PCF); his successor, Malek Boutih, was national secretary of the PS in charge of social issues (including immigration-related issues); another president of SOS Racisme, Dominique Sopo, started political activism in the UNEF-ID socialist student trade-union, before taking membership in the youth organisation of the PS.

SOS Racisme believes that, to put an end to racial discrimination, changes must be made to methods of urban planning and to education. Since the early 1990s, it has denounced the ghettos that are on the outskirts of big cities. The association advocates integration, and often cites examples of successful immigrants or their descendants.

At the turn of the century, SOS Racisme declared support for the Israeli–Palestinian peace process that was interrupted by the Second Intifada. It also denounced a resurgence of antisemitism in a book jointly published in 2002 with the UEJF, a Jewish student organization. Since then, the two organizations have continued to collaborate. Their Rire contre le racisme event (Laughing against racism) is held annually since 2004 at the Zenith concert hall in Paris, where it has featured performances by comedians such as Michel Boujenah, Dany Boon, Jean-Marie Bigard and Gad Elmaleh. In 2003, they also founded a joint student association called FEDER (Fédération des Enfants de la République) which runs for office in university elections.

In February 2006, during the Jyllands-Posten Muhammad cartoons controversy, SOS Racisme organized public meetings to defend their publication.

=== Bankruptcy and criminal proceedings against Norwegian branch ===
Its Norwegian branch SOS Rasisme was by far the largest chapter of SOS Racisme and claimed to have 40,000 members and 270 local branches. SOS Rasisme was closely affiliated with and largely controlled by the Workers' Communist Party and later by the Maoist party Serve the People – The Communist League (the Marxist-Leninist-Maoist faction which split from the Workers' Communist Party in 1997 as a result of an internal conflict), and was widely described as a front organization for those communist parties. SOS Rasisme went bankrupt in 2013 after being convicted of defrauding the government by exaggerating its membership, and 8 of its leaders, including its last President and its last Secretary-General, were indicted for fraud, embezzlement and money laundering in 2015 and subsequently convicted and sentenced to prison in 2016. SOS Rasisme faced strong criticism from the media in Norway and from all mainstream political parties over several years due to its dominance by Maoists, and SOS Racisme has been widely considered politically extreme in Norway and was shunned by some other anti-racist organisations.

== Presidents of French chapter ==
- Harlem Désir, 1984–92
- Fodé Sylla, 1992–99
- Malek Boutih, 1999–2003
- Dominique Sopo, 2003–2012
- Cindy Leoni, 2012–2014
- Dominique Sopo, 2014–present

== National chapters ==
- SOS Racisme Switzerland
- SOS Racisme Catalunya
- SOS Rassismus - AktionCourage e.V. Germany
- SOS Racismo Portugal
- SOS Racisme Denmark
- SOS Razzismo Italy
- SOS Rasisme Norway (went bankrupt in 2013 after its conviction for fraud)
- SOS Mitmensch Austria
- SOS Racismo España https://sosracismo.eu/ (includes several offices in the North of Spain and publishes an annual summary of the state of racism in Spain and Europe: https://sosracismo.eu/informe-sos-racismo/)

== Bibliography ==
- Serge Malik, L'Histoire secrète de SOS-Racisme; Albin Michel, 1990; 185 p., ISBN 2-226-04818-9
