= Haute-Saône Keuperian coal mining basin =

Coal basins at Vosges and Jura

47°23′42.83″N 5°37′23.85″E

Location of deposit on map of French coalfields

The Haute-Saône Keuperian coal mining basin constitutes the coal basins from the Vosges and Jura. From a geological perspective, it represents the most recent of the two coal deposits in Haute-Saône. Coal mining in the region commenced in the late 16th century and continued until the mid-20th century, with operations occurring in the southeastern portion of Haute-Saône, as well as in the northern regions of Doubs and Jura in eastern France. The coal extracted from this field was characterized by high sulfur content, making it a low-grade resource. This quality limited its use in most applications; however, it was effectively used as fuel in boilers for evaporating brine at local saltworks. Additionally, other resources such as rock salt, pyrite, and gypsum were also extracted from the same geological layer.

Despite being exploited over a larger area and for a longer period than the Ronchamp and Champagney mining basin, the Haute-Saône coalfield had a less significant economic and social impact due to its artisanal and irregular production methods. The peak of mining activity occurred in the 19th century, with eight concessions granted between 1826 and 1845. In 1879, four of these concessions—Gouhenans, Athesans, Saulnot, and Vy-lès-Lure—were merged, resulting in a cumulative production of 1.16 million tons. During World War II, efforts were made to address coal shortages and support local industries. Research by the Bureau de Recherches Géologiques et Géophysiques (BRGG) was initiated in this and other small basins not subject to the Occupation's quotas. By 1944, after mining operations had ceased, the estimated remaining reserves were approximately 500,000 tons of exploitable coal.

== Location ==
The various concessions in Haute-Saône Stephanian coalfield Saulnot (Corcelles) Gémonval Athesans Gouhenans Vy-lès-Lure Mélecey

The coal basin is situated in the southeastern region of the Haute-Saône department, and on the northwestern edge of the Doubs and Jura departments, in the French region of Bourgogne-Franche-Comté. The deposit is bordered by the Vosges Mountains to the north and the Jura Mountains to the south. It was mined by six small concessions in Haute-Saône and a few others in neighboring departments.

The nearest coal deposits are the Stephanian Sub-Vosgian coal basin, located to the northeast, which partially overlaps the area in question, and the Jura coal basin, situated to the southwest. Additionally, a Keuperian basin exists in the Vosges, less than a hundred kilometers away.

== Geology ==
Deposit formation

The deposit, which is of the Keuperian age (between 230 and 220 million years old), forms part of the coal basins of the Vosges and Jura. The deposit consists of alternating layers of soft (wet) coal and hard (dry) gypsum coal, with a maximum thickness of approximately one meter. These layers are occasionally exposed at the surface, while in other instances they are buried several tens of meters deep with a dip of 7 to 8°. The coal is separated from the gypsum by marl.

The Keuper is a sedimentary basin with a thickness that ranges from 80 to 90 meters. The formation is primarily situated within the Haute-Saône region and extends to the border of the Doubs department, spanning the area between Rougemont and Glère. Additional residual fragments are situated near Baume-les-Dames, Ougney, Arguel, Beure, Vorges-les-Pins, and Grozon. The basin is composed of alternating layers of sandstone, variegated marl, dolomite, gypsum, and coal in certain locations. The formation of the Keuper occurred concurrently with that of the Franche-Comté salt basin during the Upper Triassic period. This was a time when the Panthalassa sea, which covered the entirety of eastern France (an integral part of the supercontinent Pangaea), was in retreat, leaving behind a shallow brine lagoon formed through the process of evaporation, resulting in the deposition of a significant layer of evaporite, comprising halite (rock salt), exceeding 100 meters in thickness. This was subsequently covered by a succession of sedimentary layers, comprising more than 200 meters of marl and limestone. The deposit is divided into two parts, the first of which is characterized by deposits from shallow lagoons, and the second of which is characterized by lagoon deposits. The initial section is composed of three layers of salt, exceeding a thickness of 250 meters. A narrow layer of reed sandstone separates the two stratigraphic divisions. The subsequent section is characterized by the presence of gypsum-bearing marls, anhydrite, red marl, dolomite, variegated marl, and coal. The series is completed by the Rhætian sandstone and shales, which exhibit a thickness of approximately 15 meters.

The coal is observed to manifest as a primary layer and a minor, unexploitable layer. The coal extracted from the basin's concessions is invariably subjected to washing due to its elevated iron pyrite content, which results in generating a considerable quantity of ash following combustion. This coal is unsuitable for coke production or heating steam locomotives; moreover, the presence of sulfur precludes the production of coal gas. Consequently, its use is limited to rolling mill work, boiler heating, and stove heating. It is particularly suited for evaporating saltwater and for operating reverberatory furnaces. Its calorific value ranges from 3,400 to 5,000 calories per kg (14.2 to 20.9 J per kg).

The coal deposits in this region are frequently discovered fortuitously during drilling operations targeting the extraction of rock salt (and vice versa), which is mined in the localities of Saulnot, Gouhenans, and Mélecey-Fallon.

== Concessions ==
The outlines of the six Haute-Saône concessions and their main mining operations: Lettres, Corcelles pits; / 6. Elisabeth pit; 1, 2, 3. Courchaton exploration pits; / 7. Fourneau pit; 4. Houillère pit; / 8. Isaac pit; 5. Pit E; / 9. Essarts pit.

The use of coal extracted from the various concessions by the saltworks

Lifespan of the seven concessions
The dark tone indicates periods of production, whereas the light tone indicates abandonment, research, or simple possession without any work.

| Saulnot Saltworks | Gouhenans Company | Mélecey Saltworks | Le Vernoy Company |
| Gémonval Company | Athesans Company | Vy-lès-Lure Company | BRGG |

=== Corcelles (Saulnot) ===
The discovery of coal in the Keuperian basin is believed to have occurred in 1589. At that time, the Saulnot saltworks (Granges seigneury) employed two boilers to cook brine, one utilizing coal and the other wood. In 1714-1715, a new vein was discovered in Saulnot. On March 4, 1770, Jacques Liébiger was granted exclusive rights to extract coal throughout the Granges seigneury.

On October 4, 1826, the Corcelles concession was granted to Messrs. Noblot fils, Méquillert, and others by royal ordinance. Before 1838, the concession produced up to 1,000 tons of coal annually, notably from a 36-meter deep shaft. Subsequently, the concession was merged with others by a presidential decree on March 14, 1879.

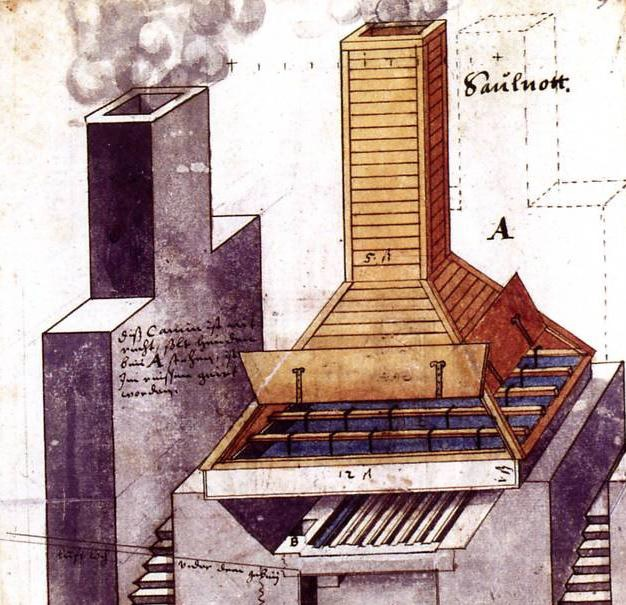
A coal furnace at the saltworks

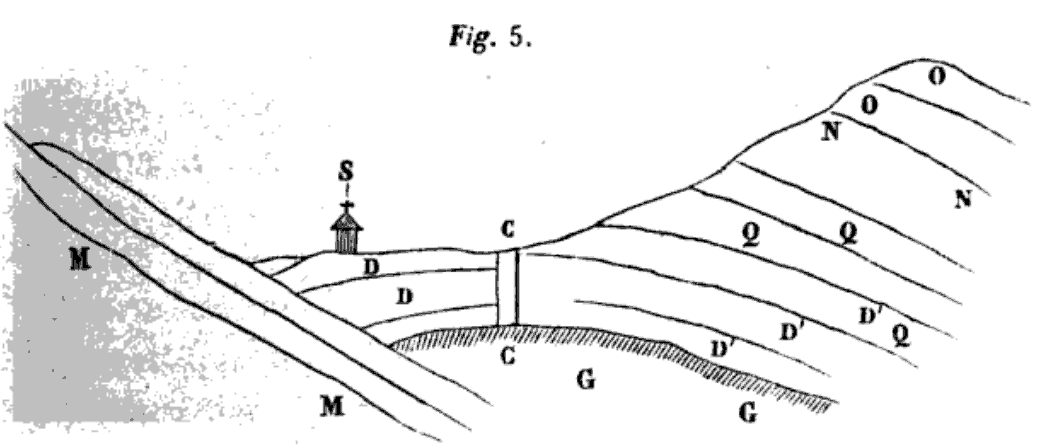
A mine shaft from Saulnot

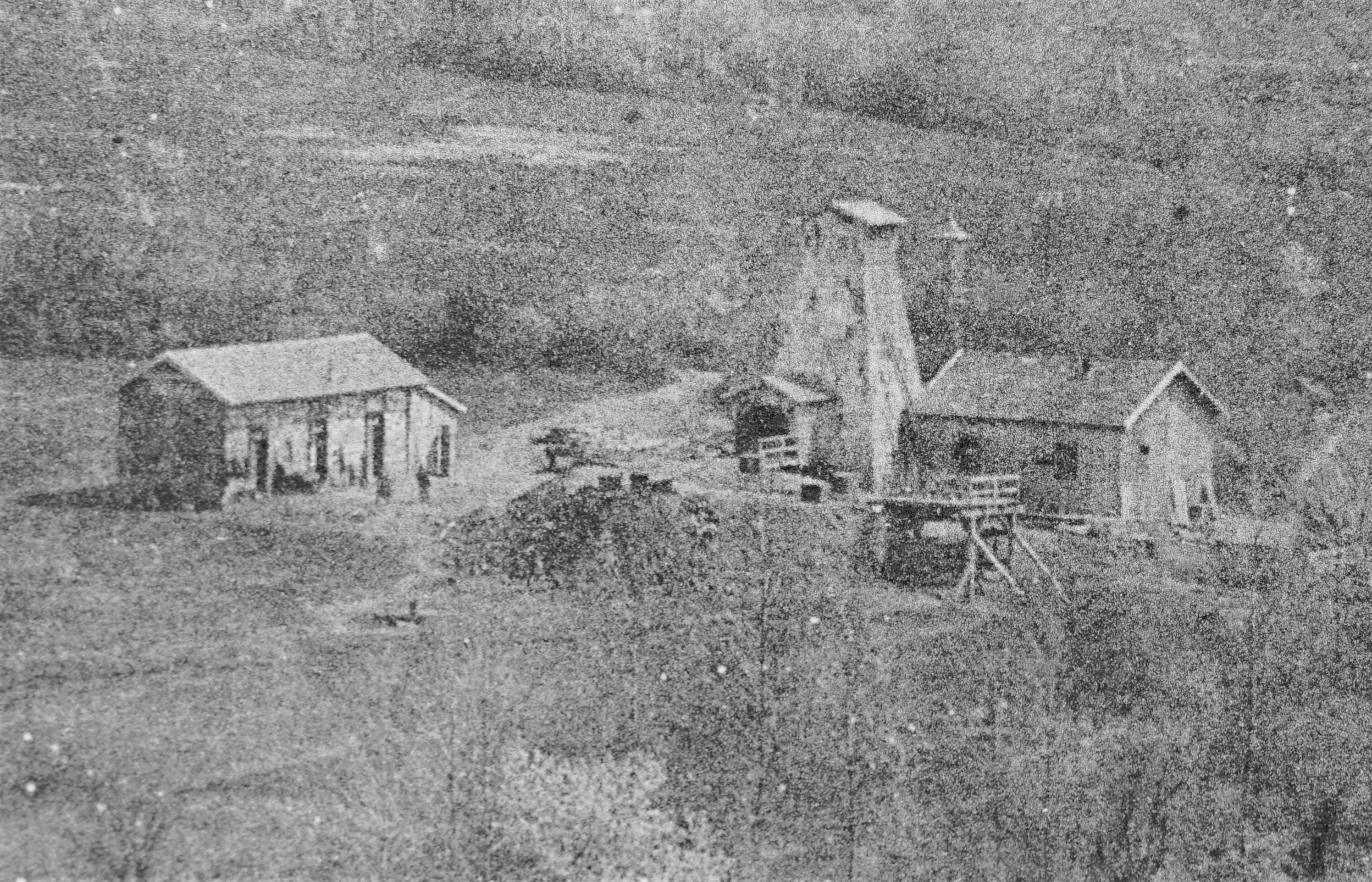
Shaft D surface infrastructure in the early 20th century

In the early 20th century, mining activity was particularly intense in the northern region of Corcelles, with seven shafts sunk before 1921. Of these, five were recorded by the BRGM. The extracted coal was utilized in the Gouhenans saltworks until the cessation of mining activities in 1921. In 1941, the estimated reserve quantity for Corcelles was approximately 8,000 tons. In the early 21st century, the remains of three Corcelles coal mine shafts are still visible on IGN maps, situated in close proximity to the Rhine-Rhône LGV. Additionally, their associated spoil heaps are discernible, with the E shaft being of particular note, as it has been excavated to a depth of 10.5 meters.

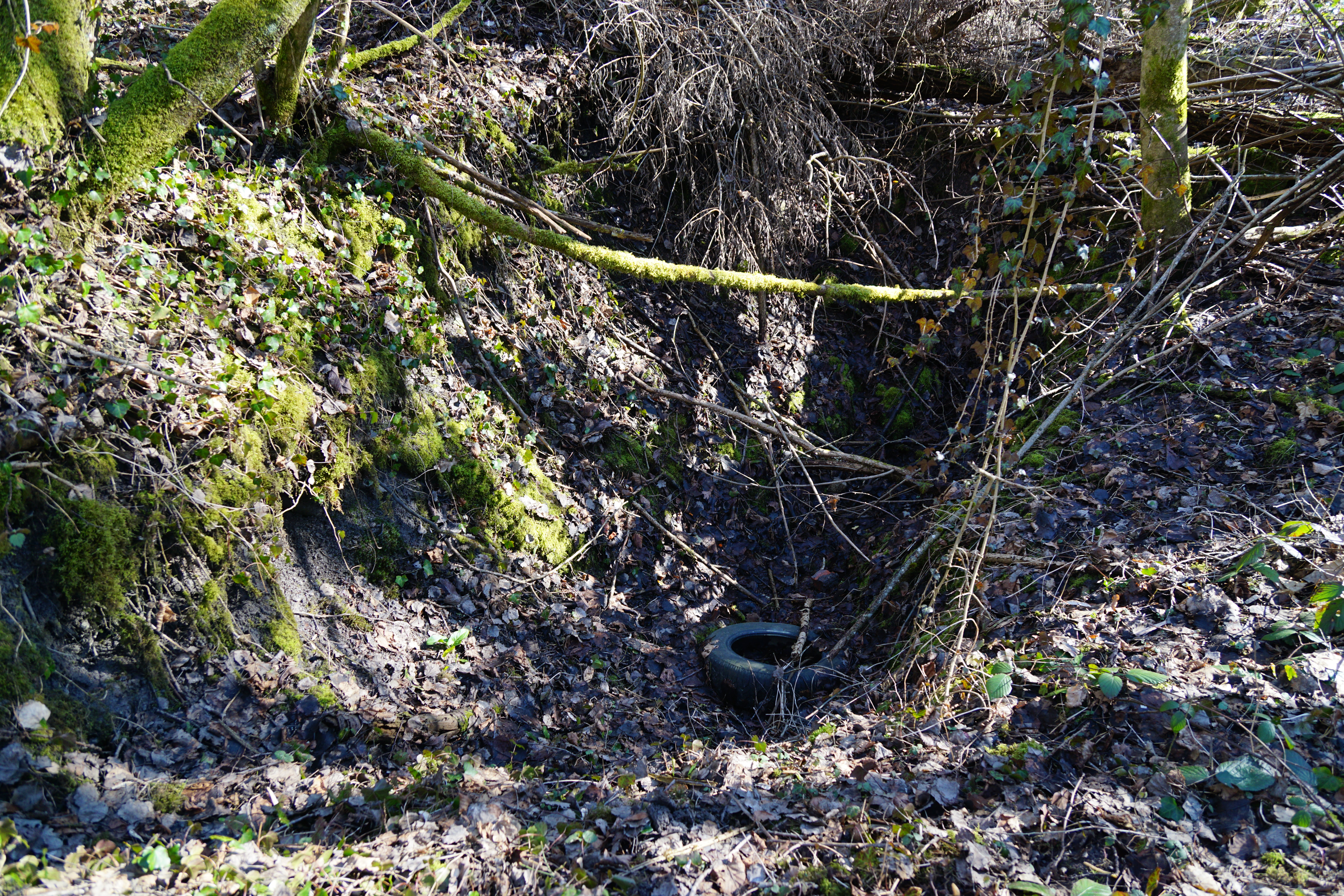
The old D shaft at Corcelles

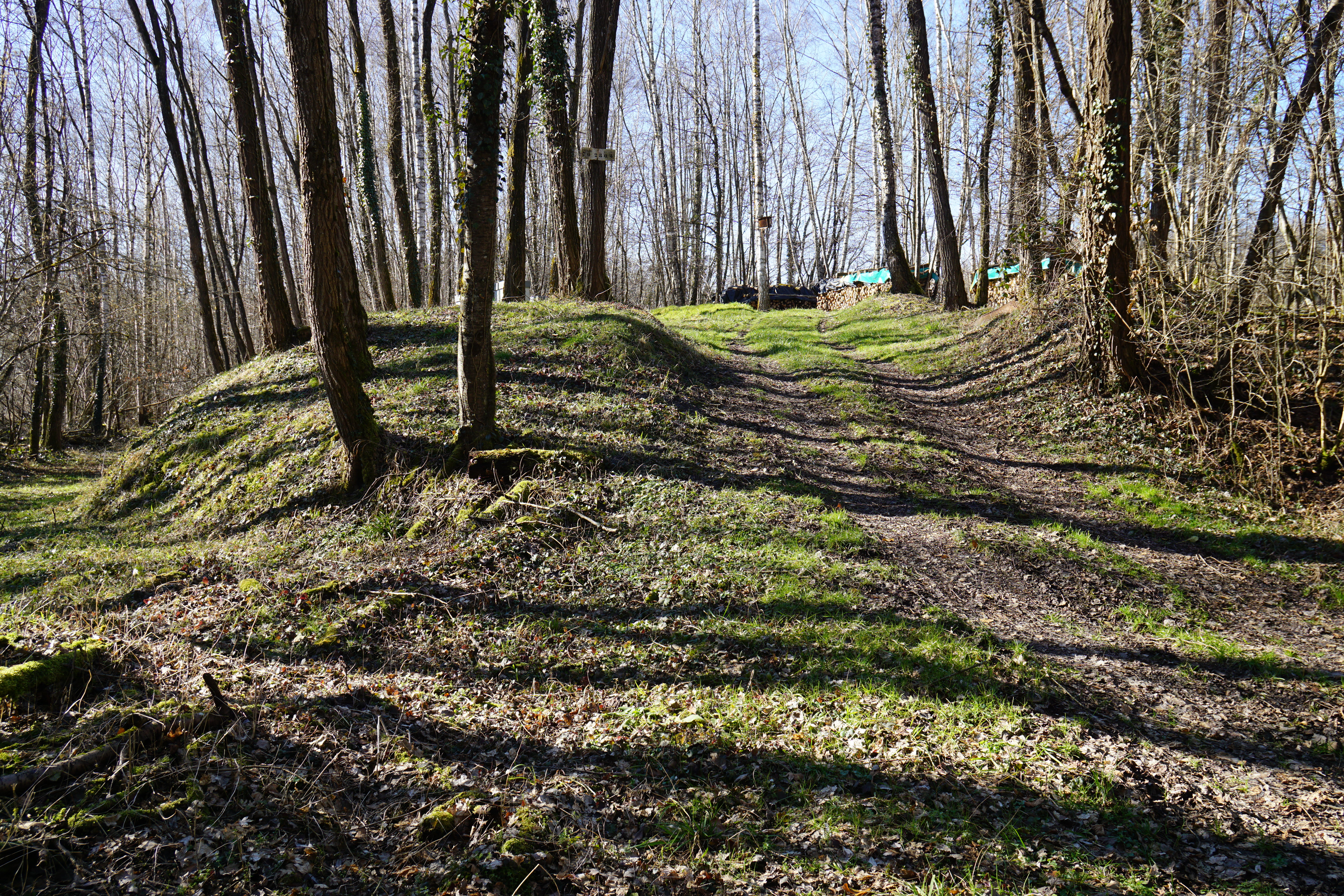
The slag heap

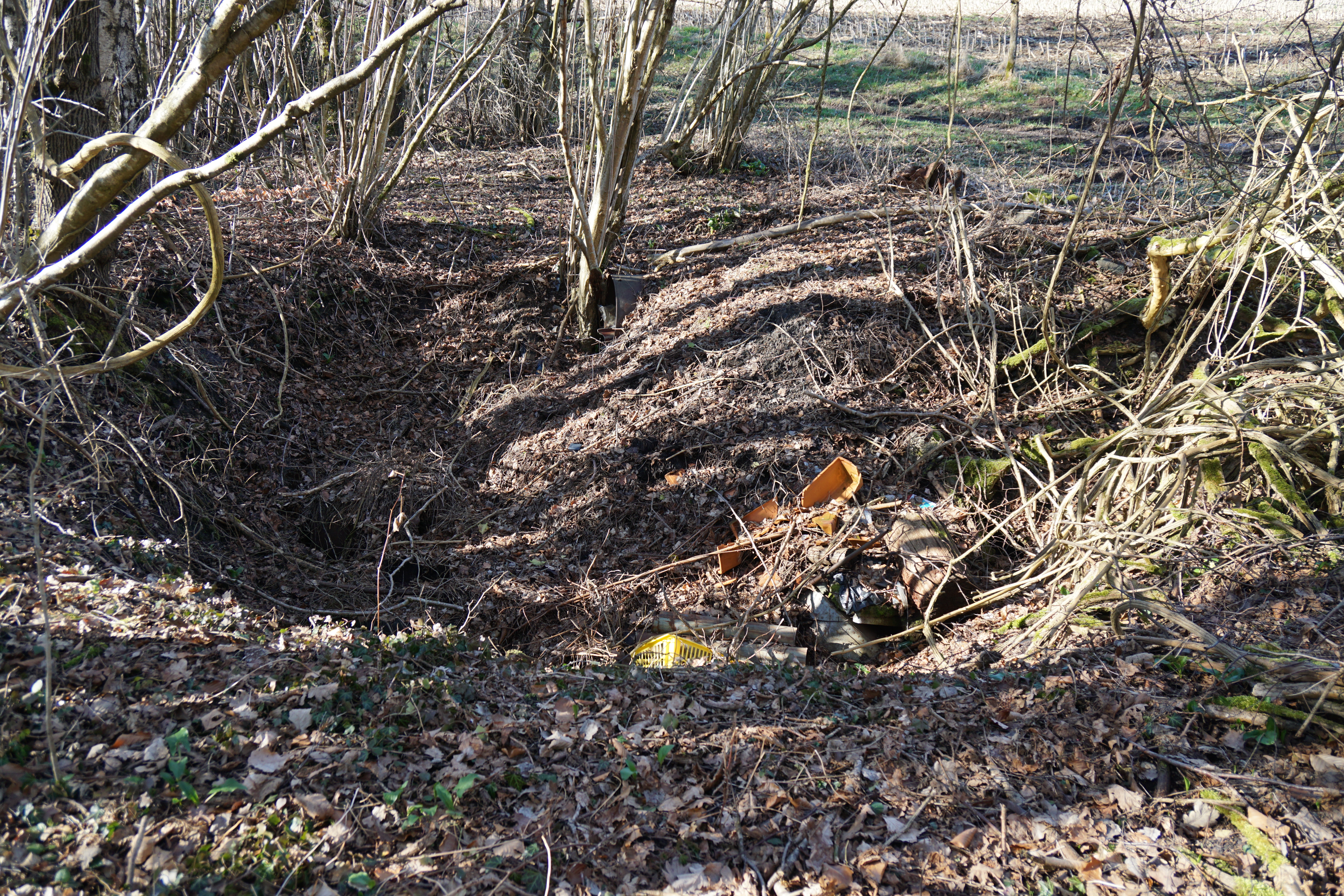
View of shaft F

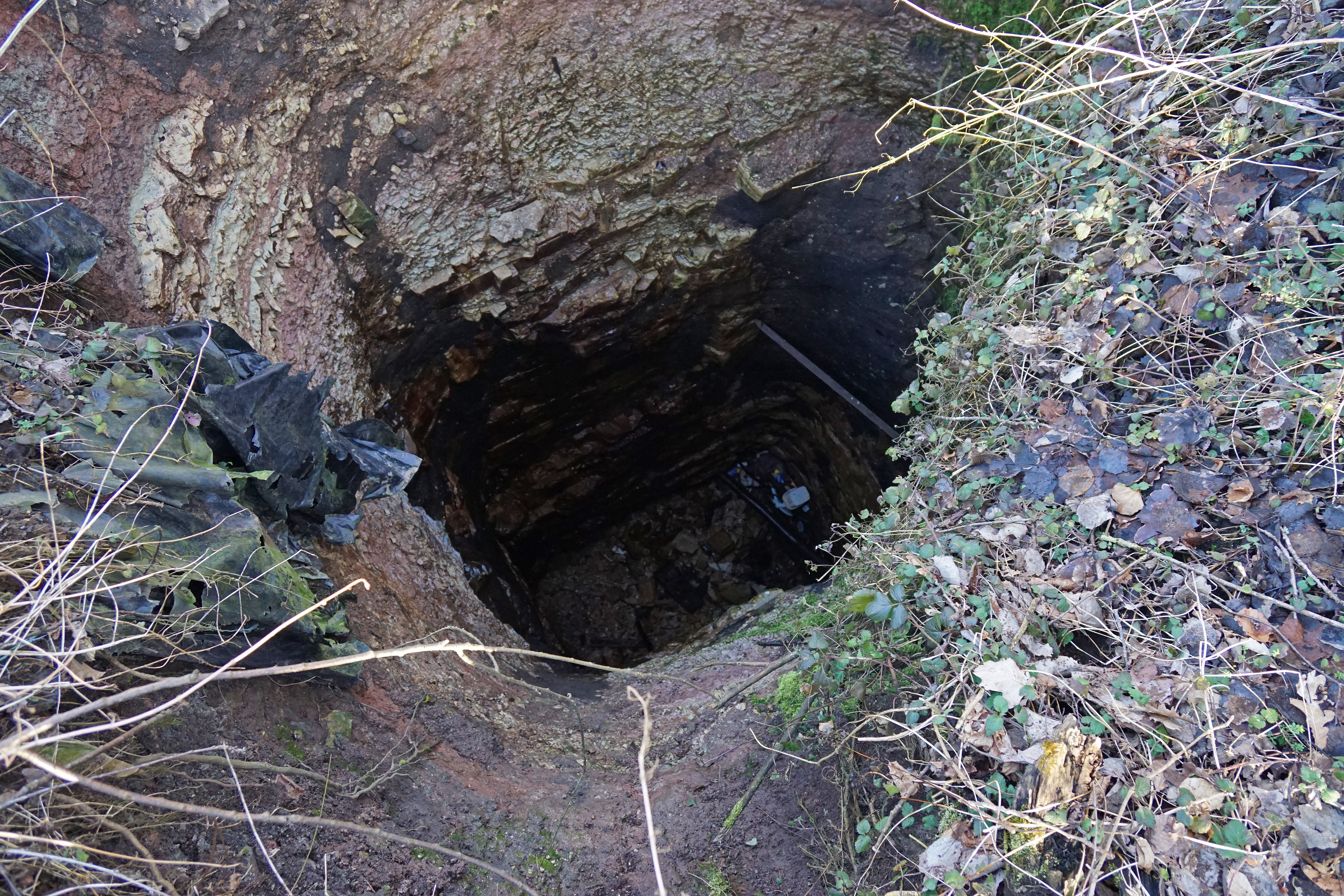
The old open shaft (E)

=== Gémonval ===
The Gémonval concession, encompassing an area of 2,056 hectares, was awarded on October 8, 1826. The mine experienced two periods of activity. The first was between 1826 and 1847, during which time the concession was granted. The second period of activity occurred in the 1940s when the Bureau de Recherches Géologiques et Géophysiques (BRGG) conducted further exploration. These two periods were interspersed with attempts to restart operations. In the 1830s, the Gémonval mine was the subject of considerable stock market speculation. The primary use of the Gémonval coal was in the operation of boilers used for concentrating brine from local saltworks, primarily Mélecey, but also in nearby forges. Additionally, the mines sold pyrite from the coal-washing process for use in the chemical industry.

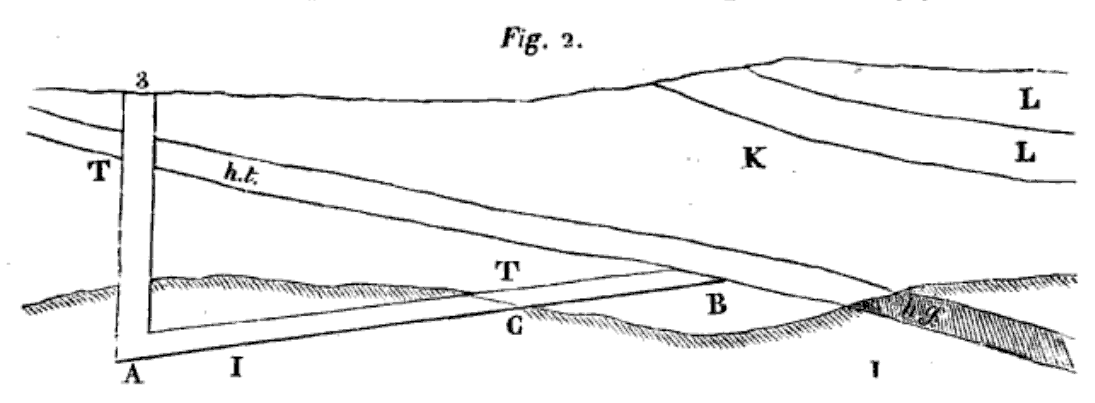
Geological section of Gémonval No. 3 well.h.t. soft coal, h.g. (grey): gypsum coal.

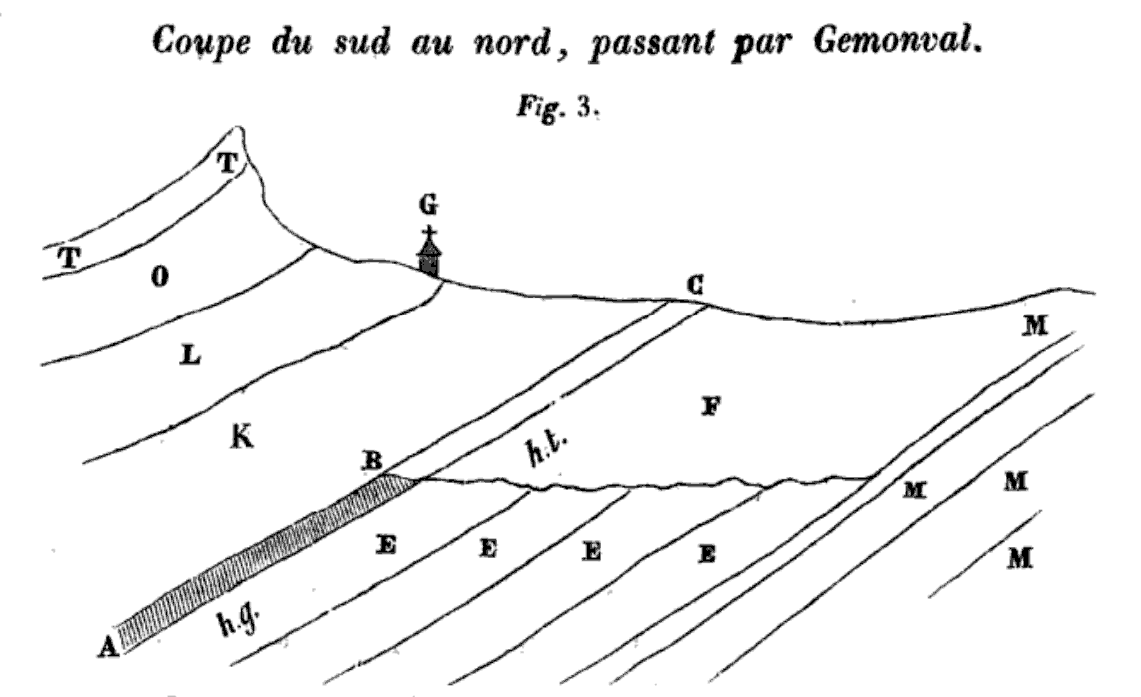
Geological section of Gémonval. B-C: soft coal, A-B (grey): gypsiferous coal.

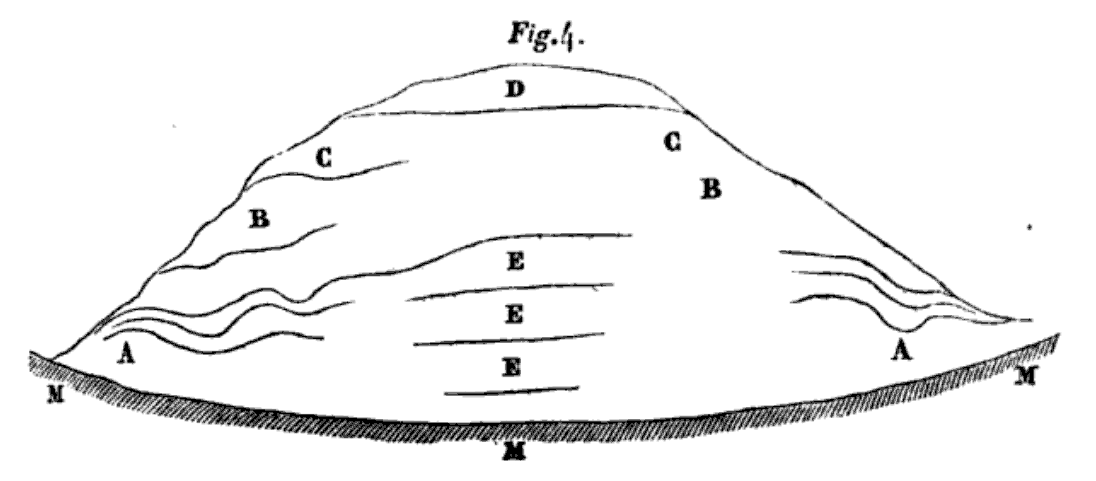
Gémonval gypsum hillock

Remnants of this activity (mine entrances, spoil heaps, ruins) still exist in the early 21st century.

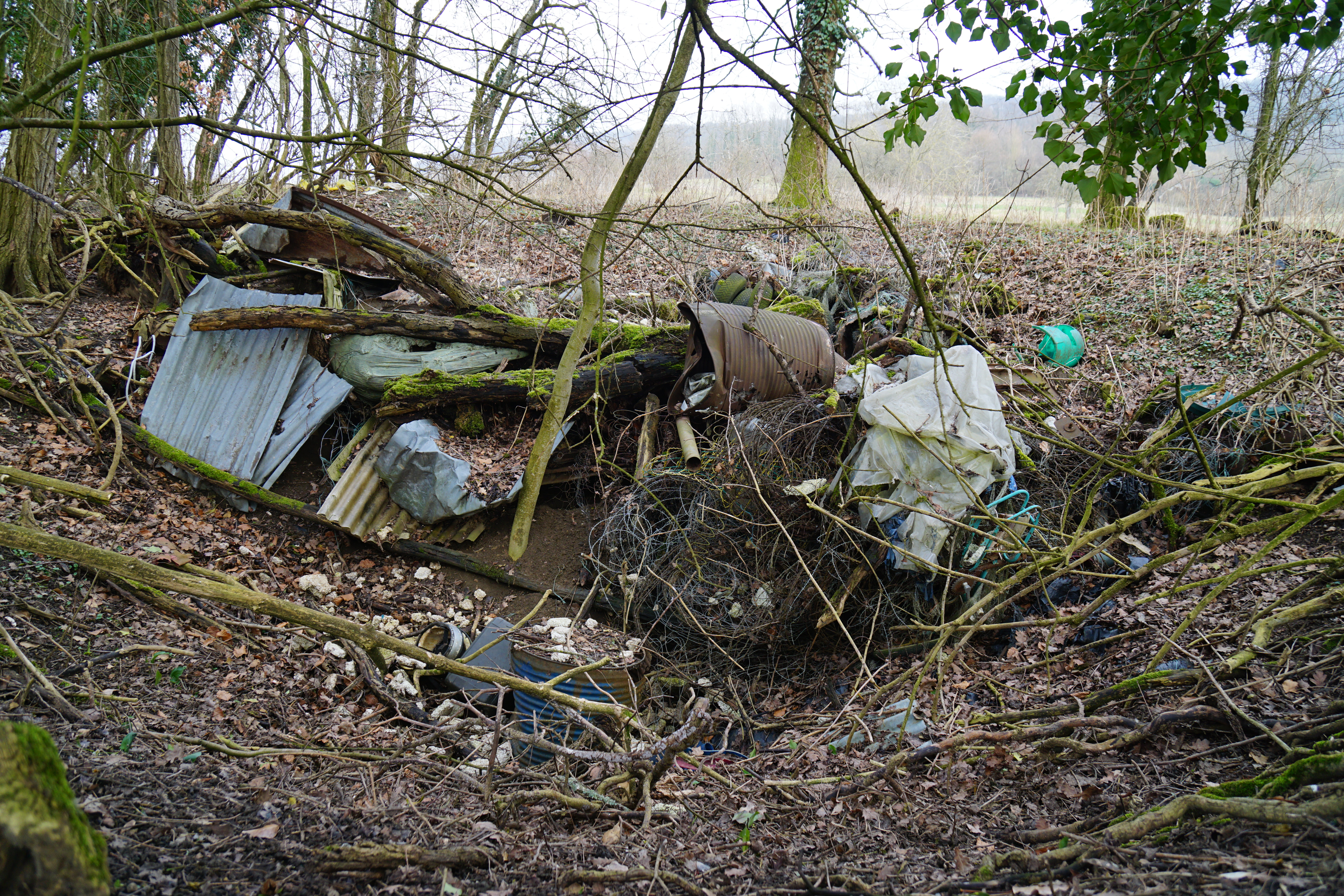
Old Elisabeth well in the hamlet of La Chapelle

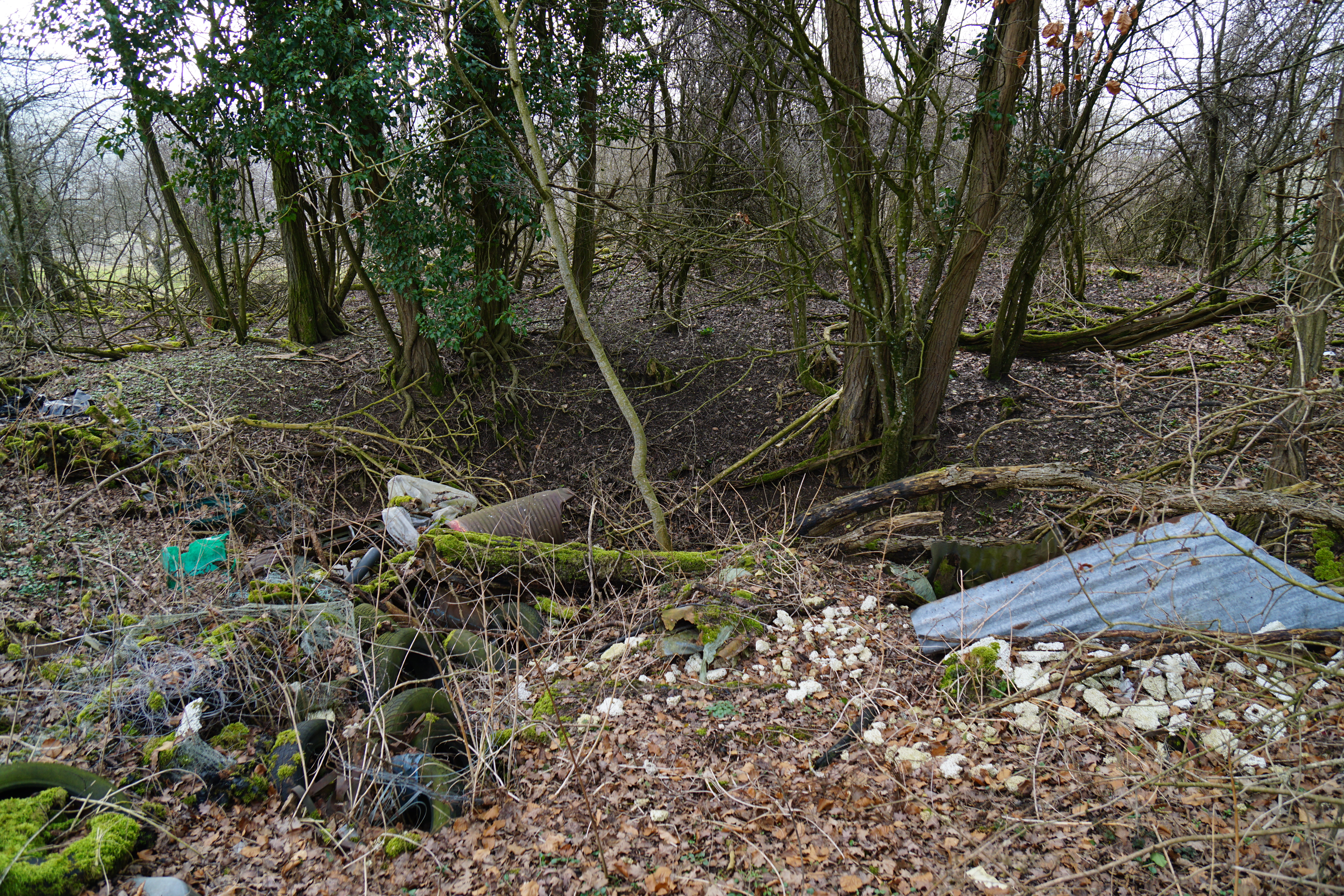
Another view

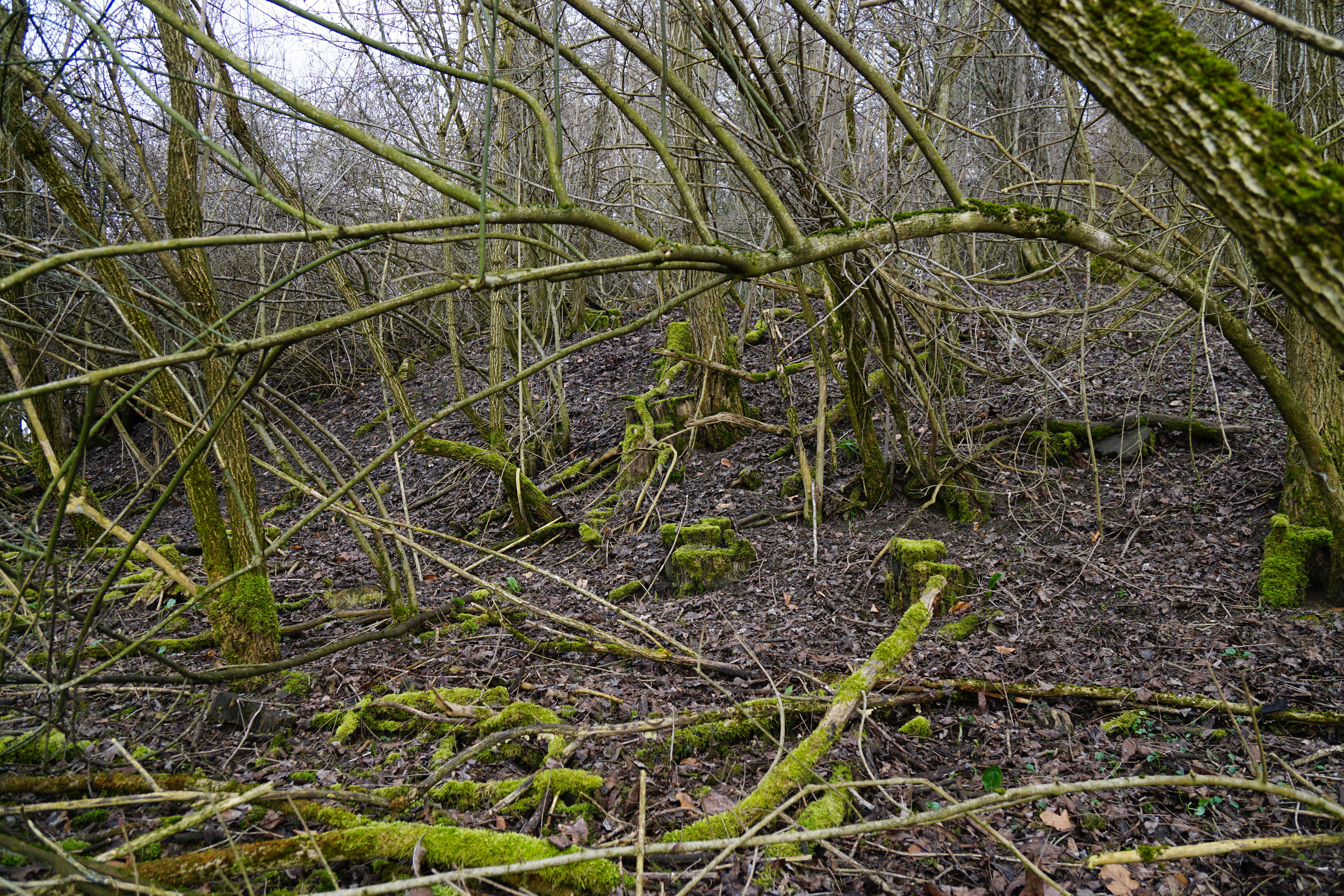
Its slag heap

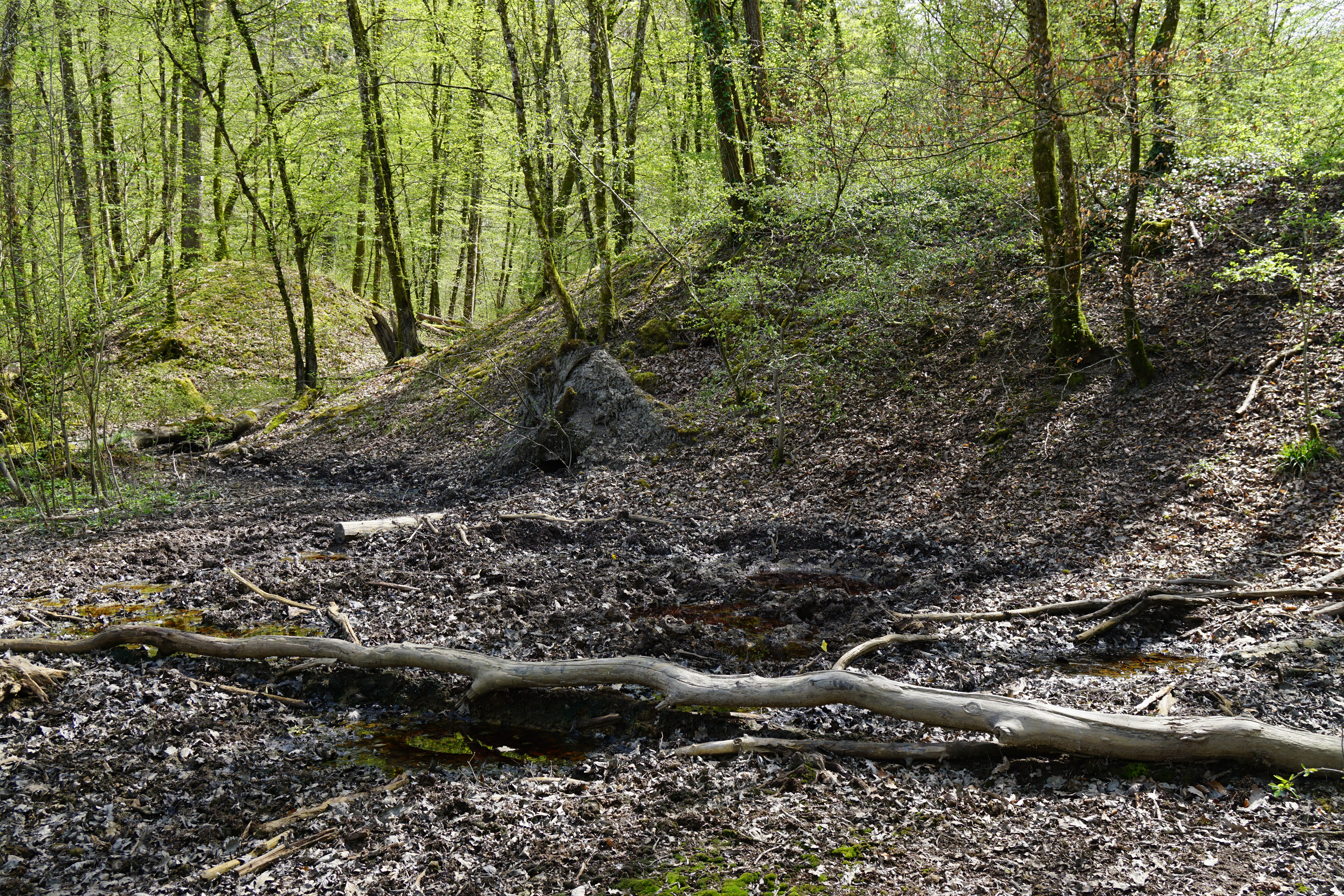
The slag heap at the Houillère well

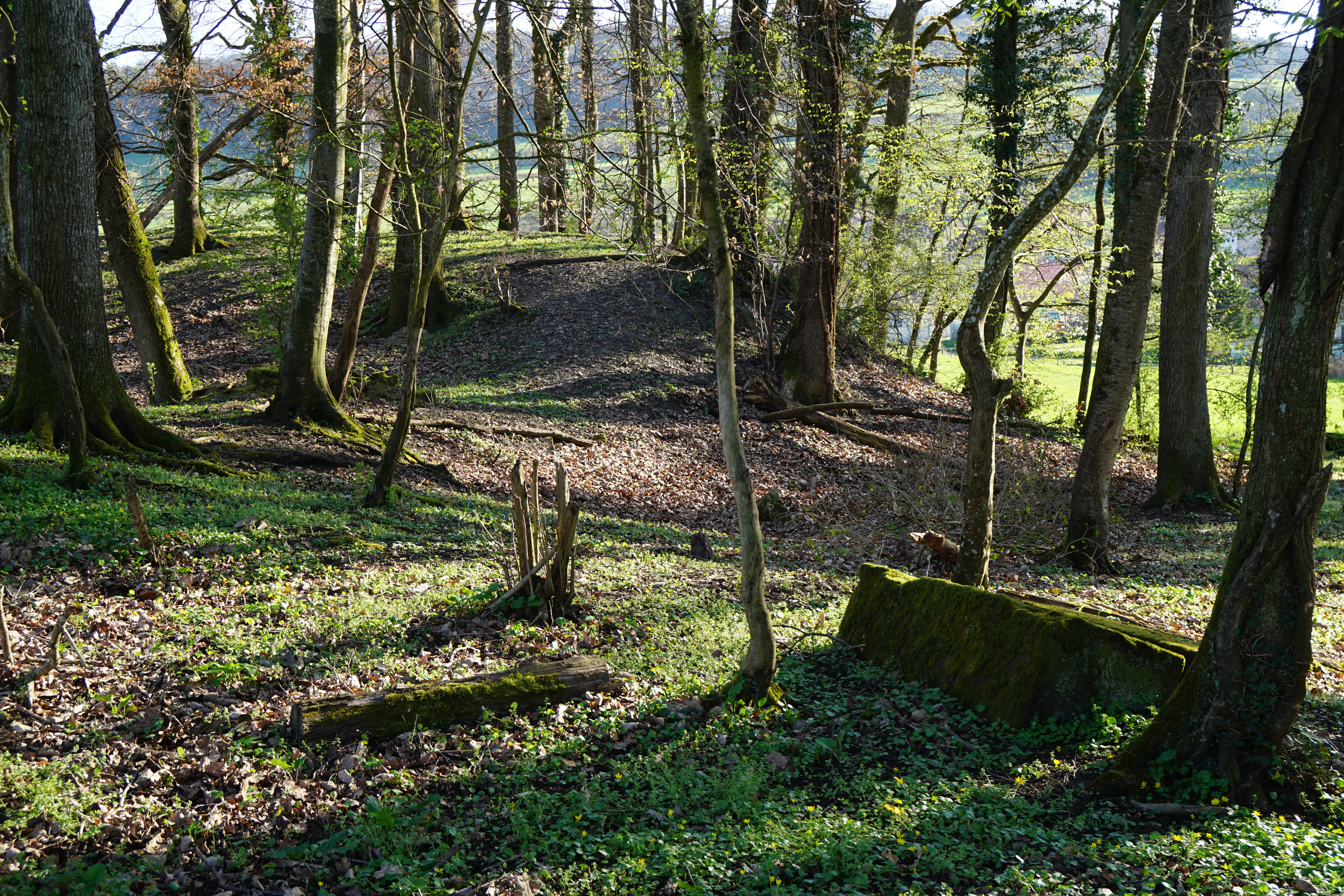
Les Essarts well slag heap

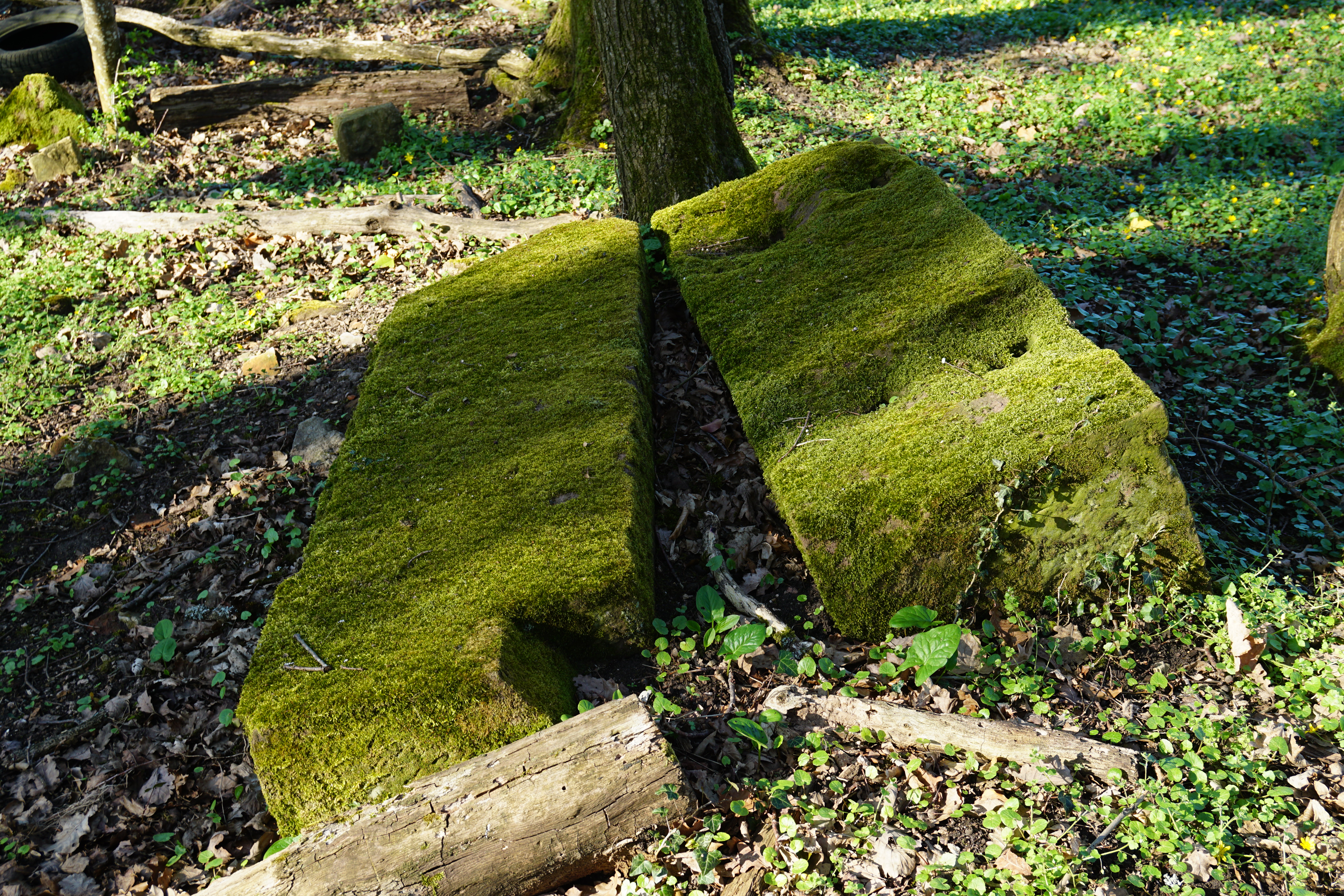
Steam engine supports at the Essarts well

=== Gouhenans ===
A coal deposit was initially identified in the vicinity of the village of Gouhenans during the 1770s, and was subsequently rediscovered in 1819. The concession, encompassing an area of 1,378 hectares, was granted on July 30, 1828. The initial phase of extraction took place in pits No. 4 and No. 5. In 1864, the Gouhenans concession was exploited through pits No. 4 and No. 10. That same year, the total production amounted to 9,983.8 tons of coal, which was sold for 0.90 francs per quintal.

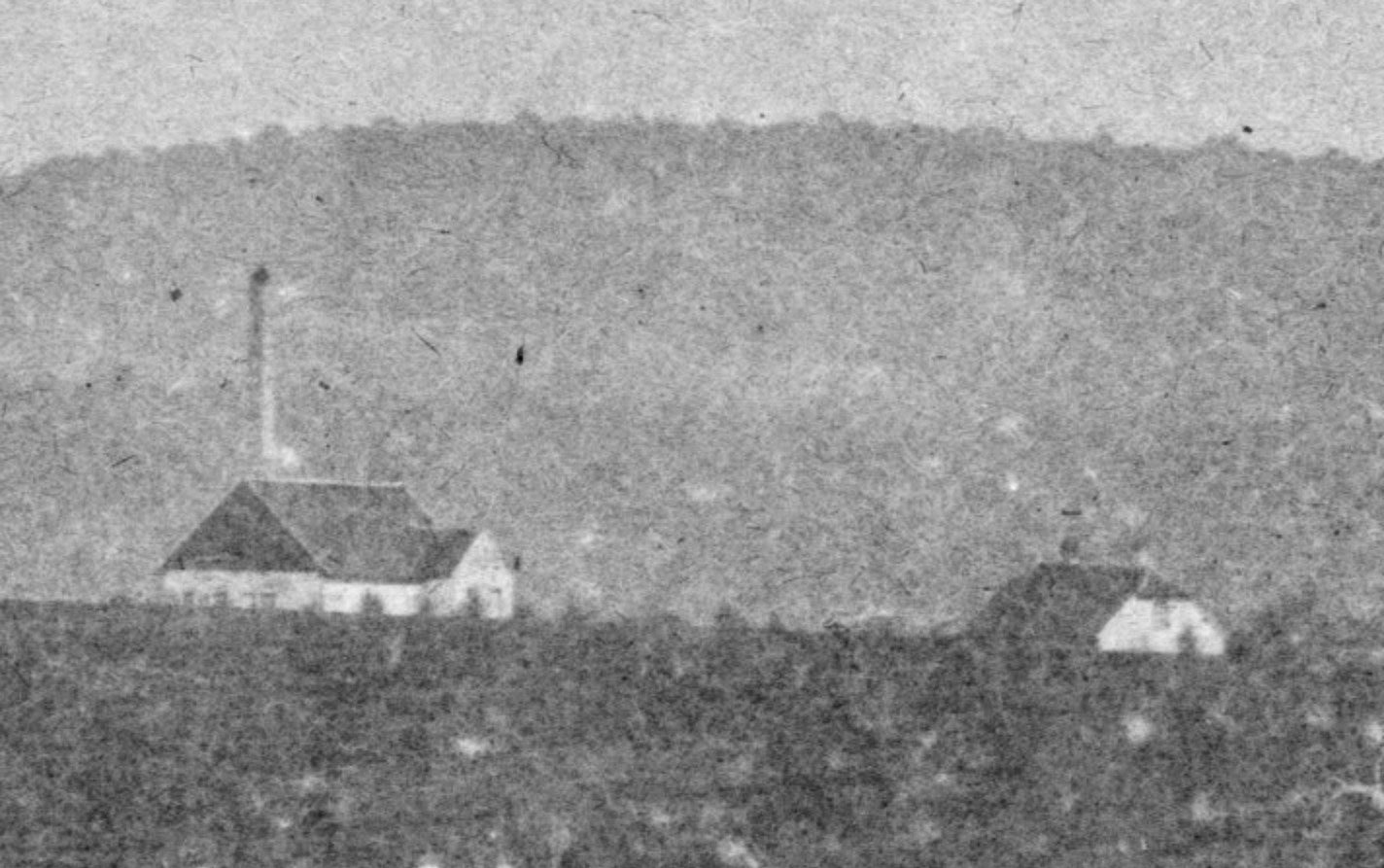
Well No. 4

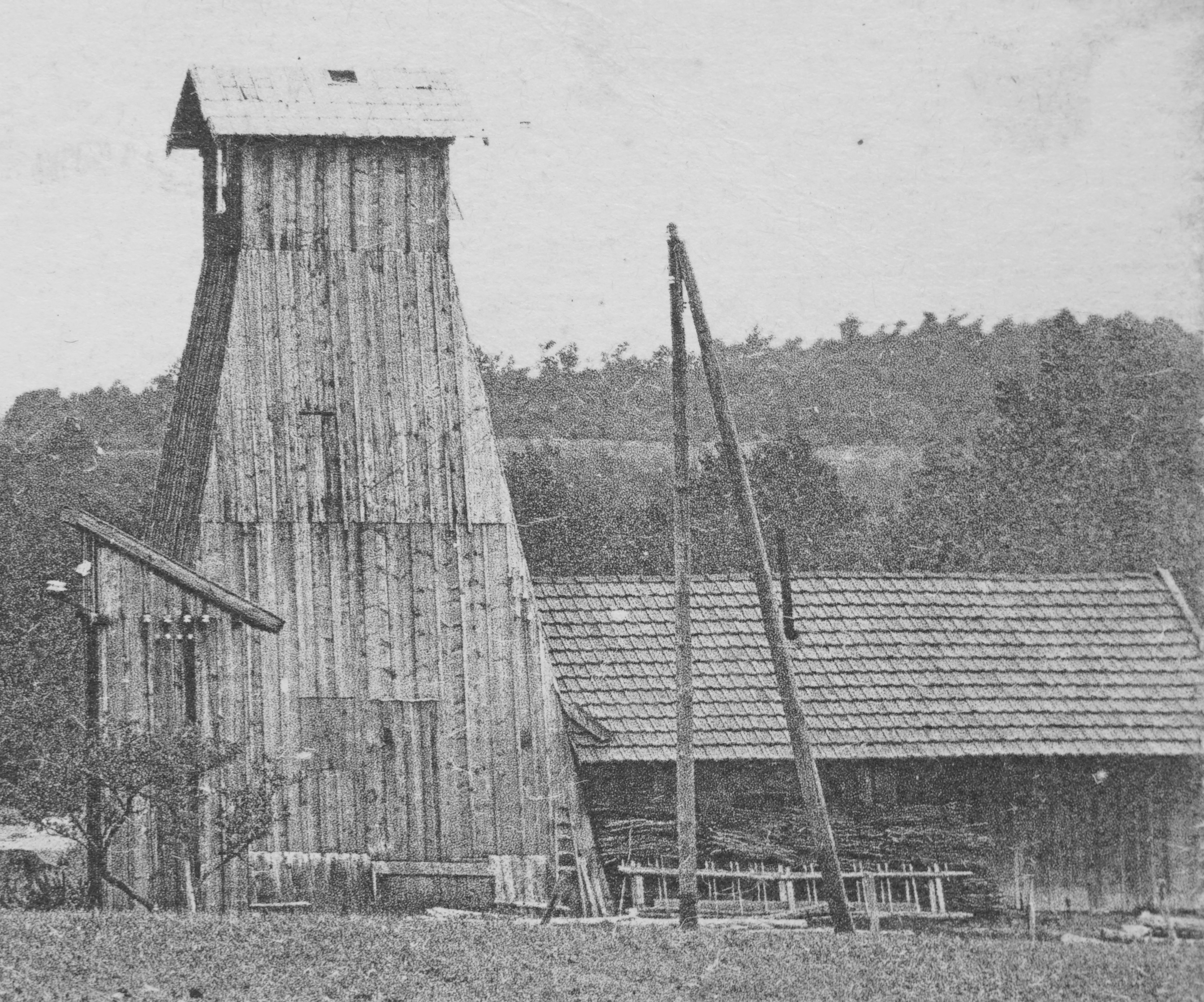
Well No. 13

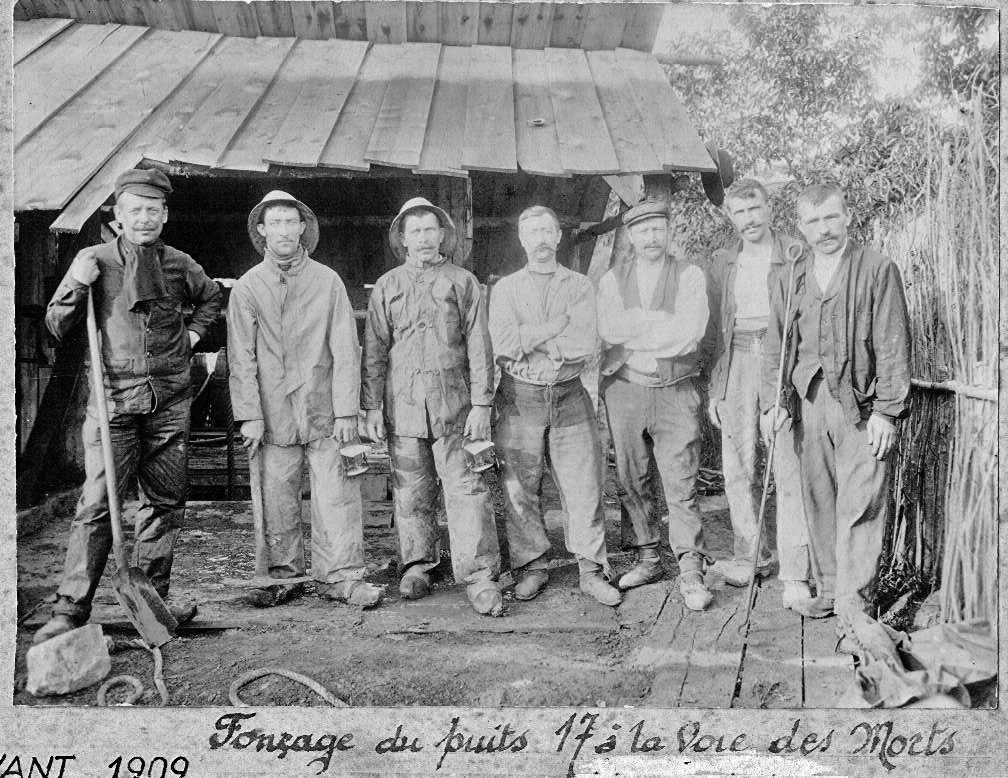
Well No. 17

Pit No. 11 was constructed in 1872, situated to the north of Villafans. This was a period when older pits were being closed, and the coal was extracted using tubs and transported by carts. The workings, located approximately one hundred meters below ground, were subject to regular inspection by the departmental mine guard until the pit's closure in 1893. (Note: The history of Well No. 11, detailed on a tourist board on site.)

In November 1893, Pit No. 15, which was established close to Pit No. 11, encountered coal at a depth of 68 meters and commenced operations in 1895. In 1899, it experienced water ingress of 750 m^{3} per day. Mining resumed in 1906 in two distinct sectors through the use of a decline and Pit No. 17. Coal mining activity ceased in 1921.

In the early 21st century, several remnants of mining operations, including spoil heaps, remain. The SHAARL (Historical and Archaeological Society of the Lure District) preserves a model representing a headframe of the concession, built by Charles Simonin. The site of pit No. 15 has been developed and integrated into a walking trail called "Between Salt and Coal." The shaft opening and spoil heap still exist.

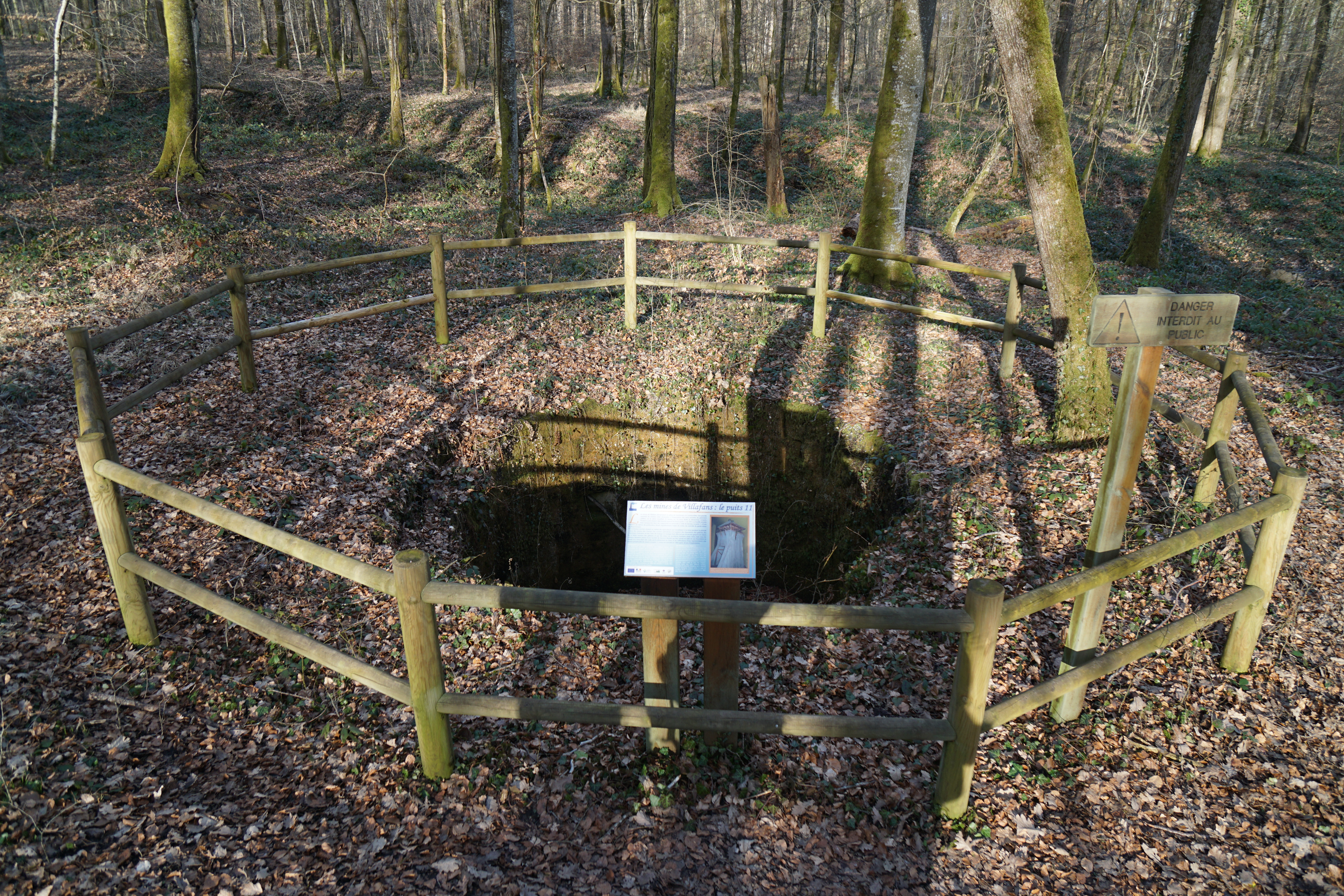
Former well No. 15

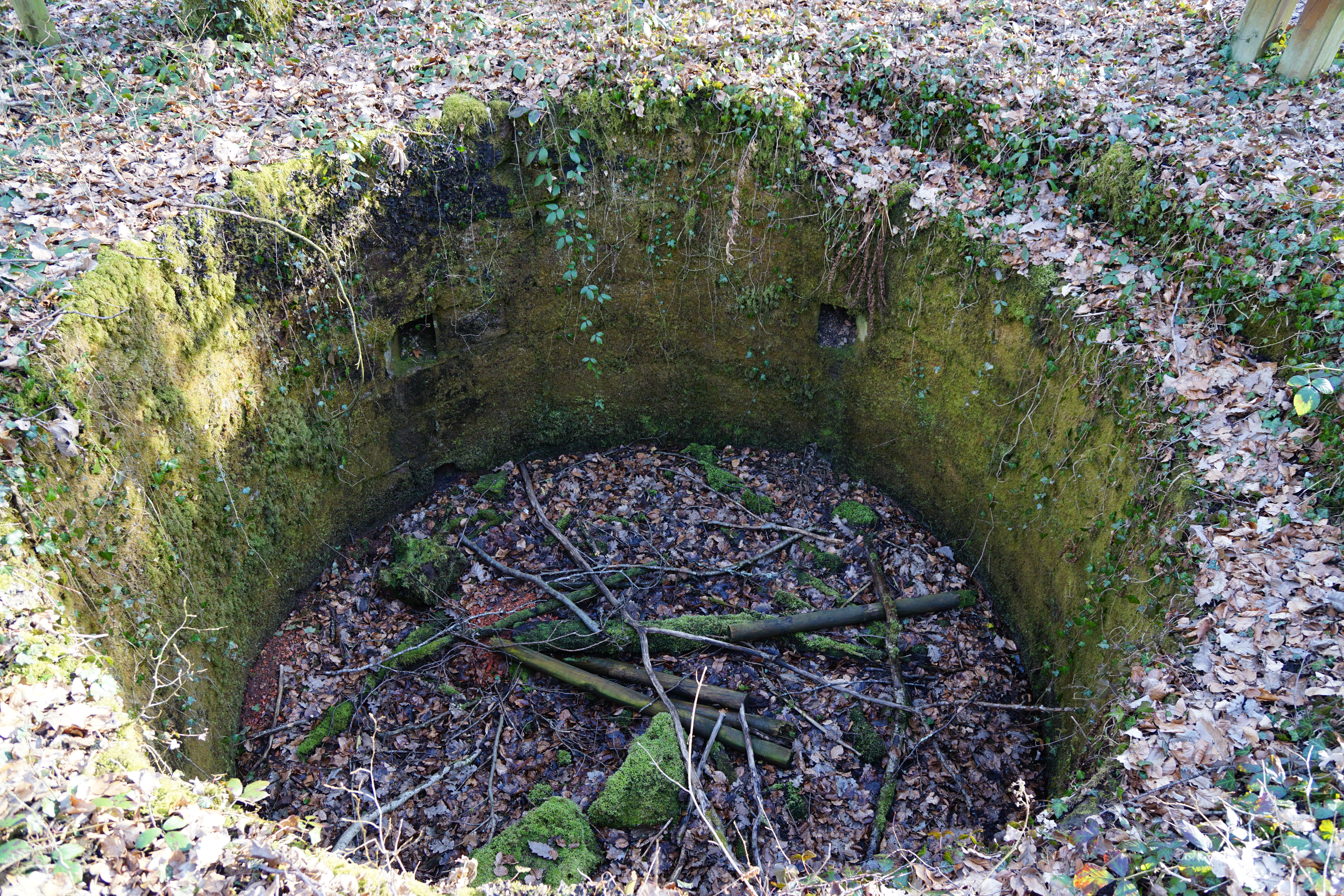
Detail of the walled-in hole

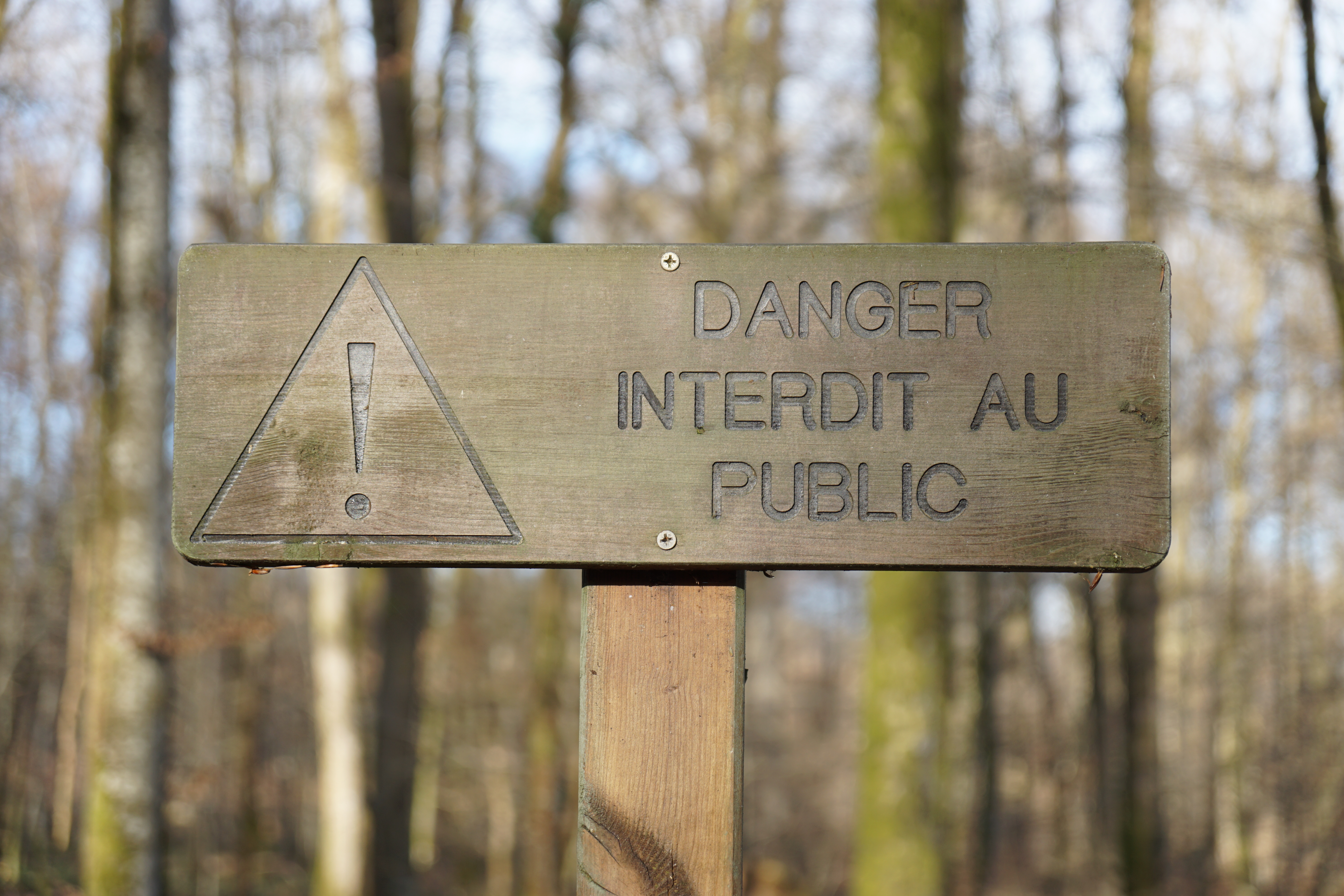
Danger sign

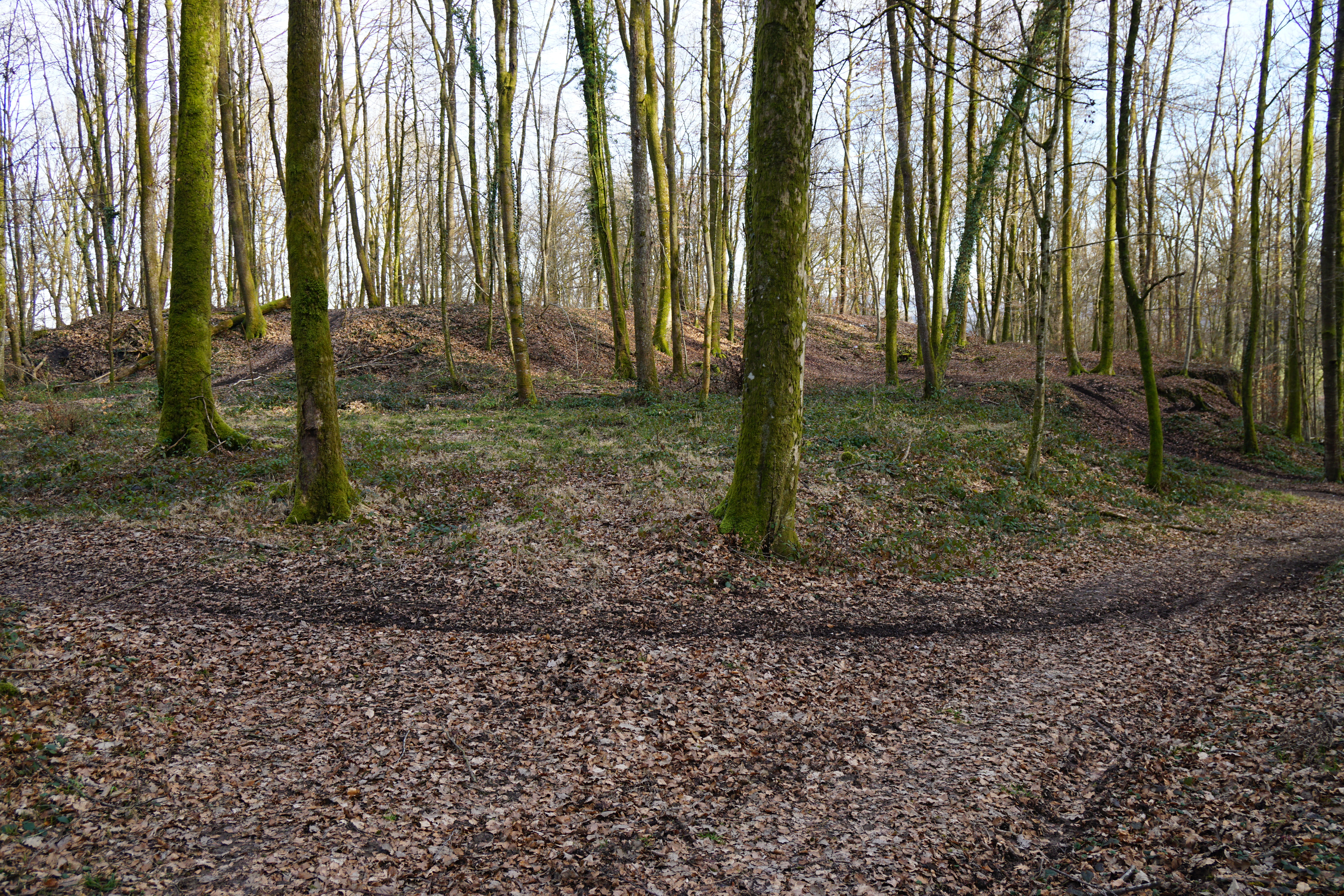
General view of the slag heap

=== Le Vernoy ===
The modest concession of 6.5 km² was bestowed by royal decree on August 16, 1839, to Messrs. Blech, Fries, and Company, a business entity based in Mulhouse, situated within the commune of Le Vernoy in the Doubs department, on a portion of the coal basin. A seam measuring between 0.33 and 0.77 meters in thickness was subjected to a brief exploitation period before the concession's relinquishment by its proprietors on July 24, 1852.

Three mine shafts were constructed to the north of the village. One of these reached the deposit at a depth of 60 meters but was subsequently abandoned before 1870 due to the significant ingress of water. This resulted in creating a spoil heap, which was still visible in 1943.

The production figures for the period under review were: 1,400 tons in 1826, 1,100 tons in 1832, and 850 tons in 1842. The request to relinquish the concession was made on October 6, 1849, and granted on July 24, 1852.

In 1904, a borehole was drilled by the Gouhenans Industrial Mining Company in search of salt. The drilling process revealed the presence of coal between depths of 60.50 and 61.20 meters.

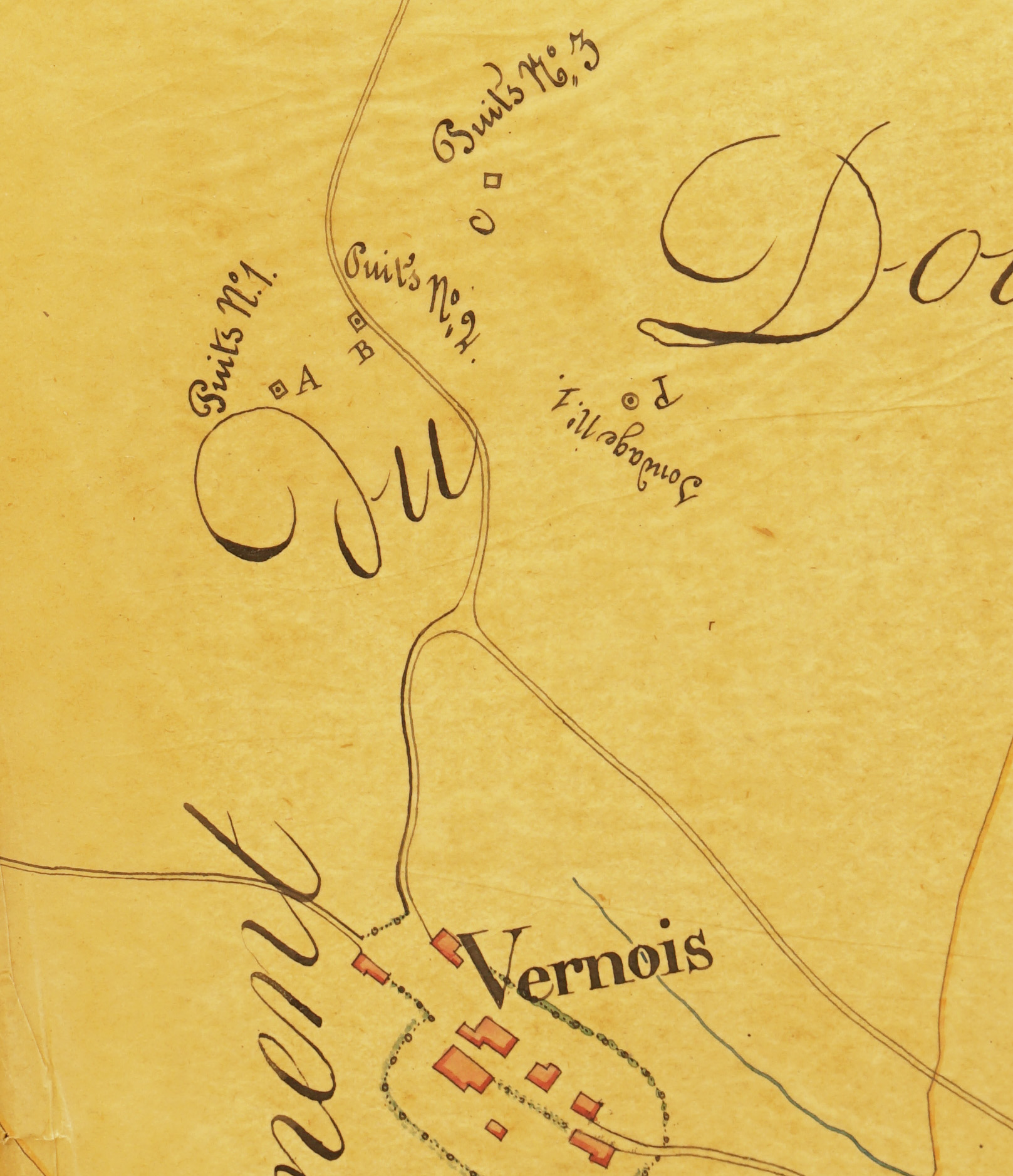
Map of the wells and village of Le Vernoy in 1838

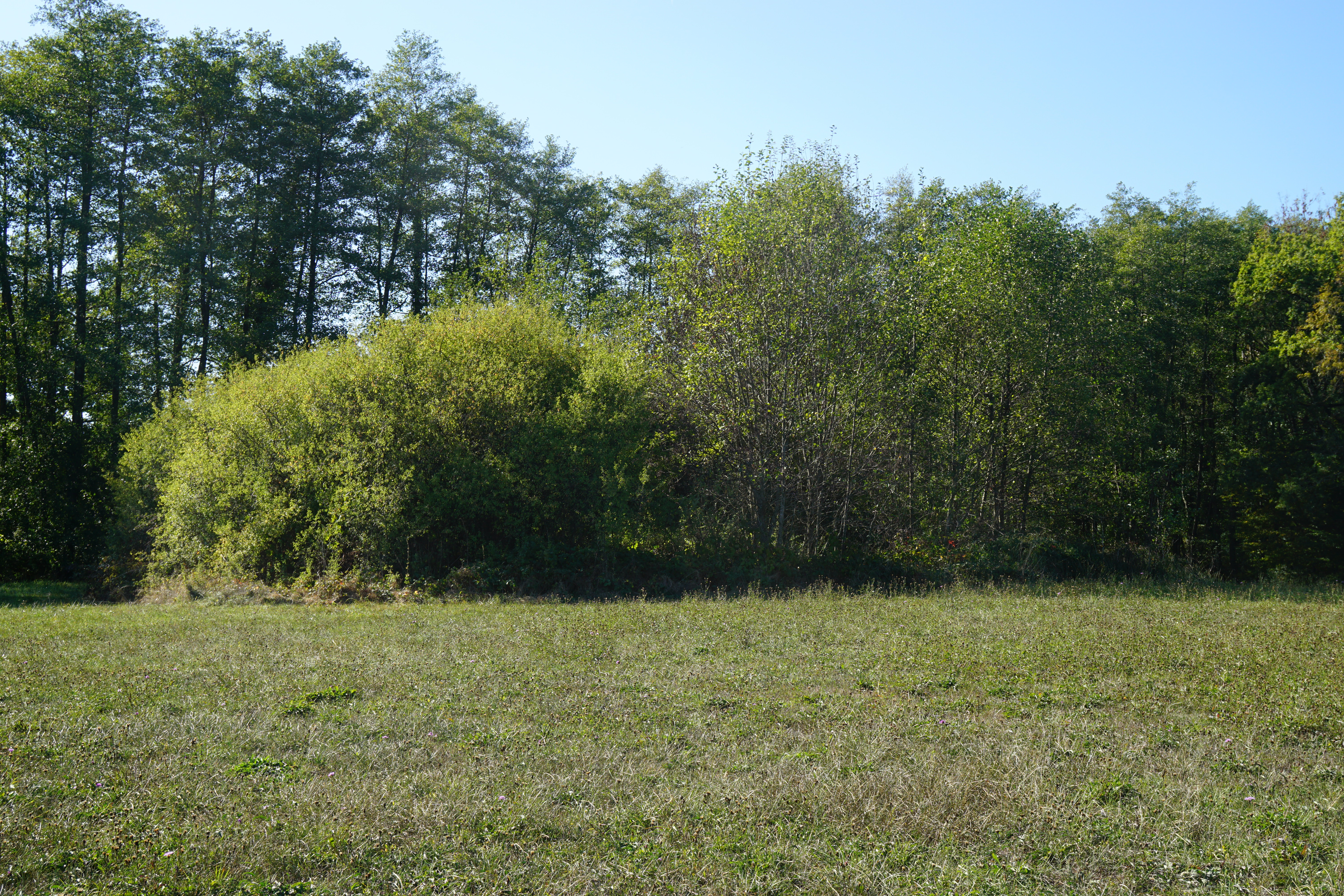
Terril of well No. 1

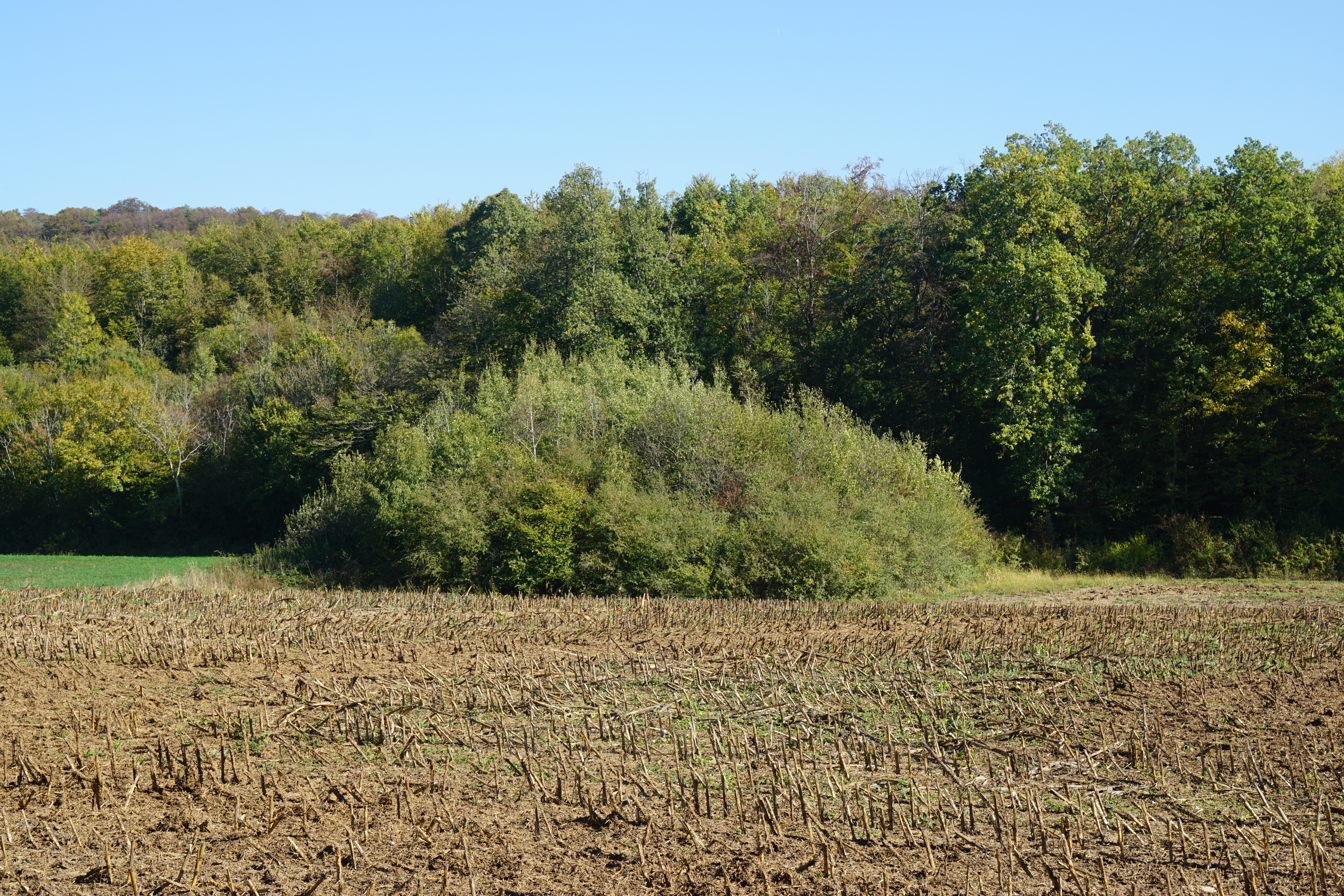
Terril of well No. 3

=== Athesans ===
The Athesans concession, encompassing an area of 1,087 hectares, was awarded on November 13, 1839. Only minimal extraction operations were conducted within this concession, with the seam thickness ranging from 0.40 to 0.65 meters. Five boreholes were drilled between 1922 and 1923.

Boreholes and pits
| Name | Depth | Date | Commune | Results |
|---|---|---|---|---|
| Well A | 20 m | 1836 | Athesans | Seam of 0.60 m. |
| Lissot well | | 1840-1845 | Athesans | A gallery dug towards the north-northwest encountered a seam of 0.35 m, which was exploited. |
| Well and survey V | 42.28 m | 1896 | Athesans | The pit stopped at 11.65 m and continued by drilling; a few grains of coal were found. |
| Survey T | | | Athesans | Unknown, probably negative results. |
| Survey 2 | 11 m | 1836 | Athesans | The seam of 0.70 m is the maximum thickness encountered. |
| Survey 3 | 30.50 m | 1836 | Athesans | Seam of 0.30 m. |
| Survey S | | | Athesans | Encountered a fault. |
| Saint-Servais wood survey | | | Athesans | Seam of 0.25 m. |
| Survey 1 | 27 m | 1922 | Gouhenans | Negative results. |
| Survey 2 | 33 m | 1922 | Gouhenans | Negative results. |
| Survey 3 | 5.80 m | 1922-1923 | Vouhenans | Abandoned. |
| Survey 4 | 17.40 m | 1923 | Vouhenans | Negative results. |
| Survey 5 | 30.95 m | 1923 | Gouhenans | Negative results. |

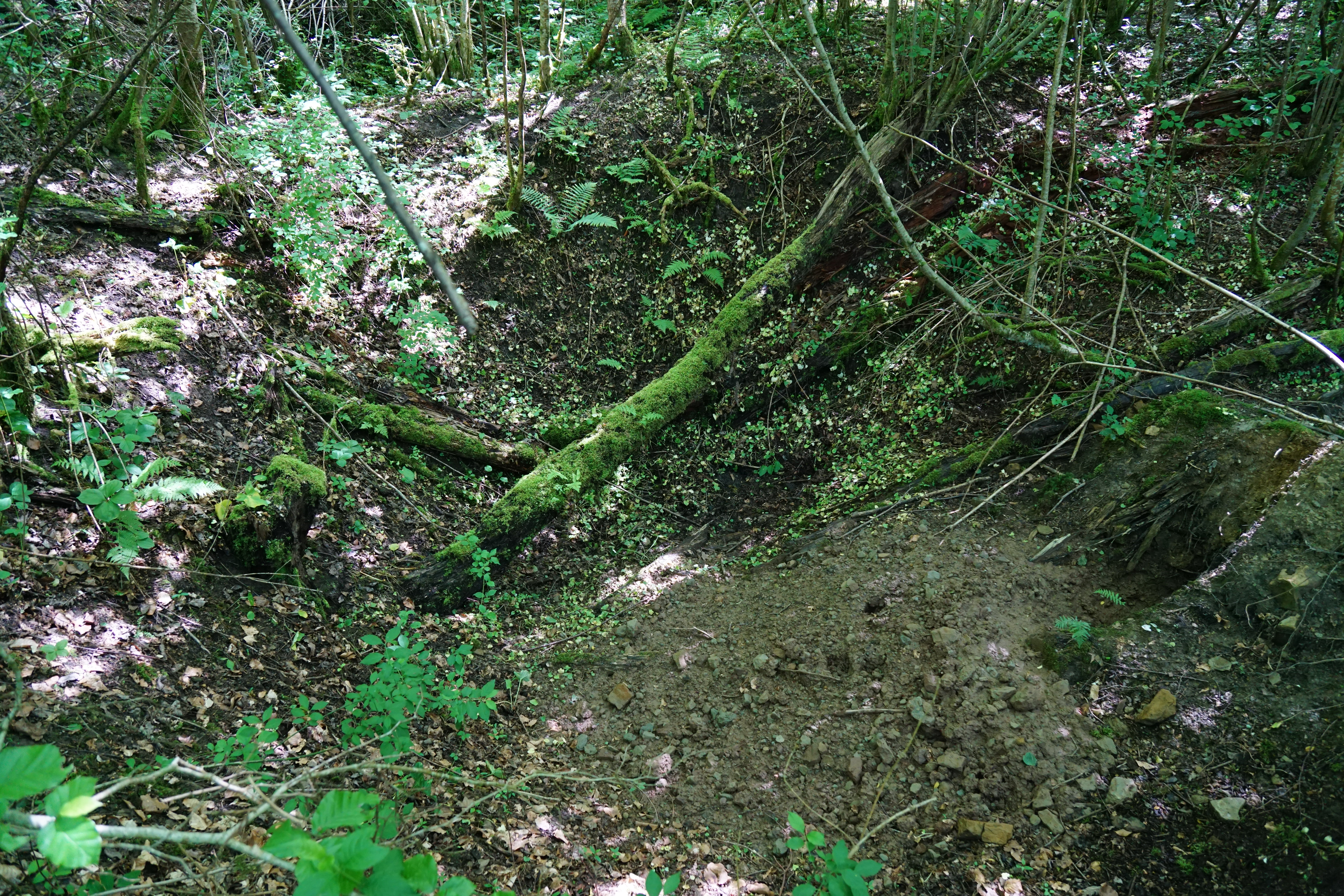
Lissot shaft

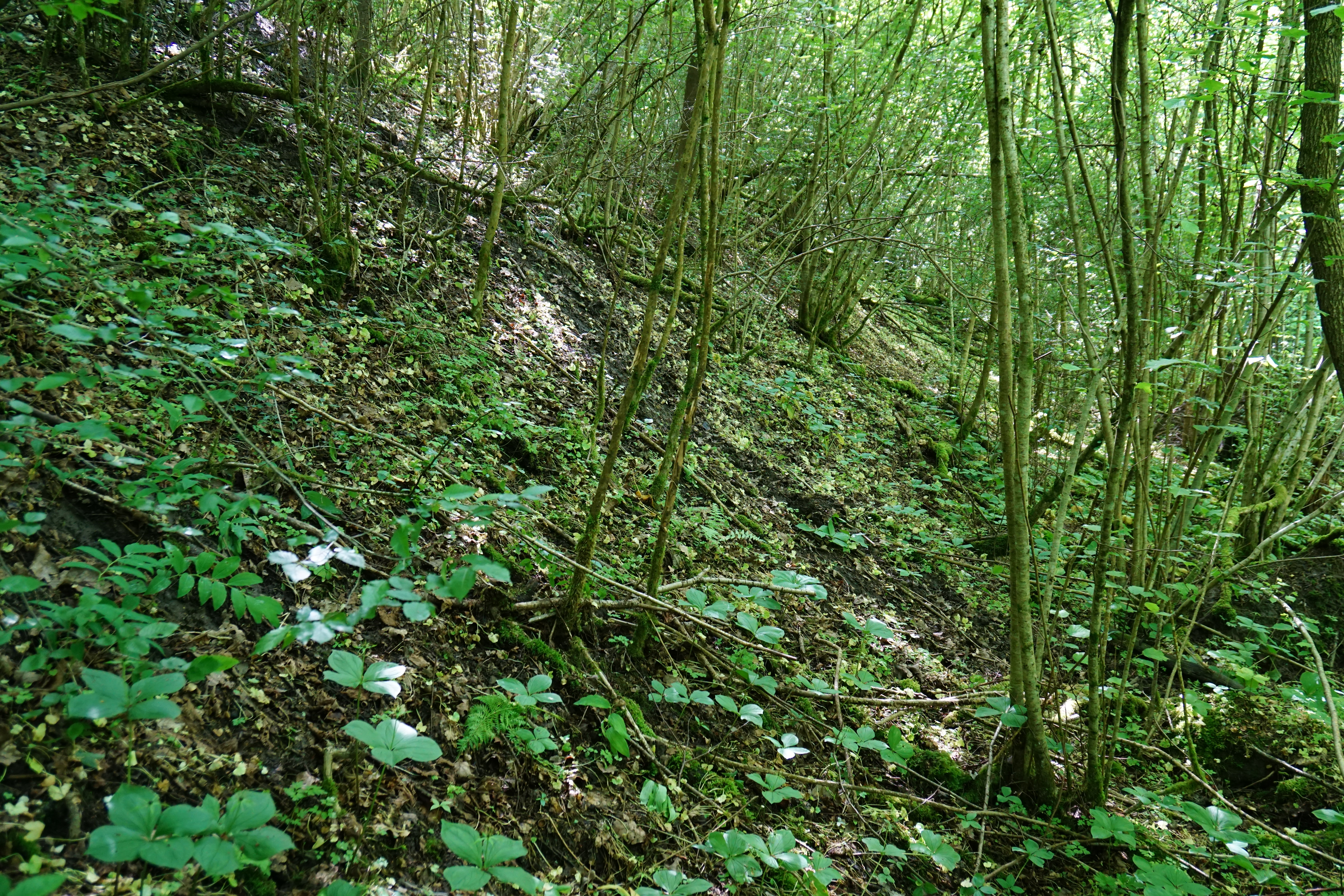
The main slag heap at the Lissot shaft

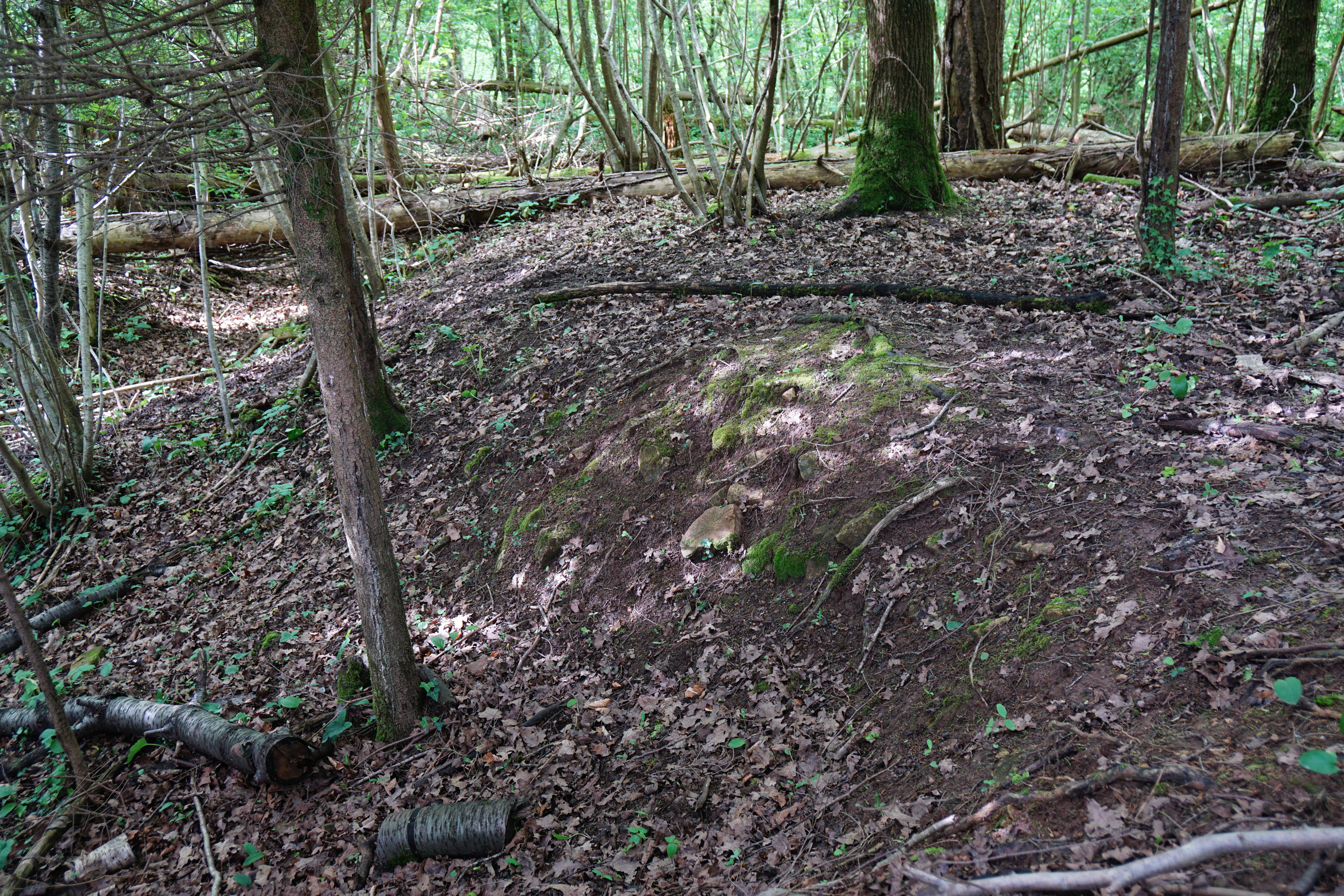
A secondary slag heap at the Lissot shaft

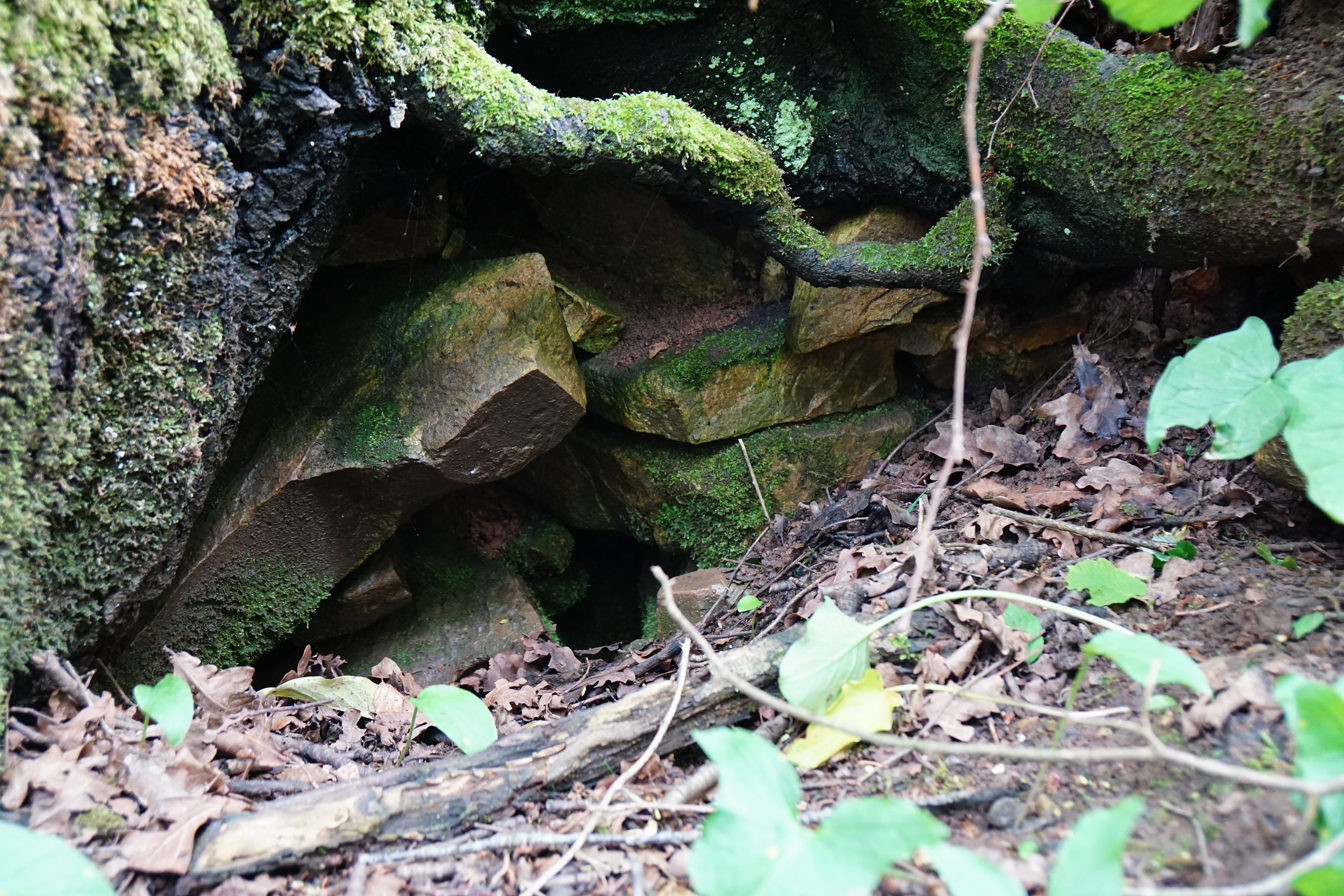
Collapse of the Lissot gallery at the secondary slag heap

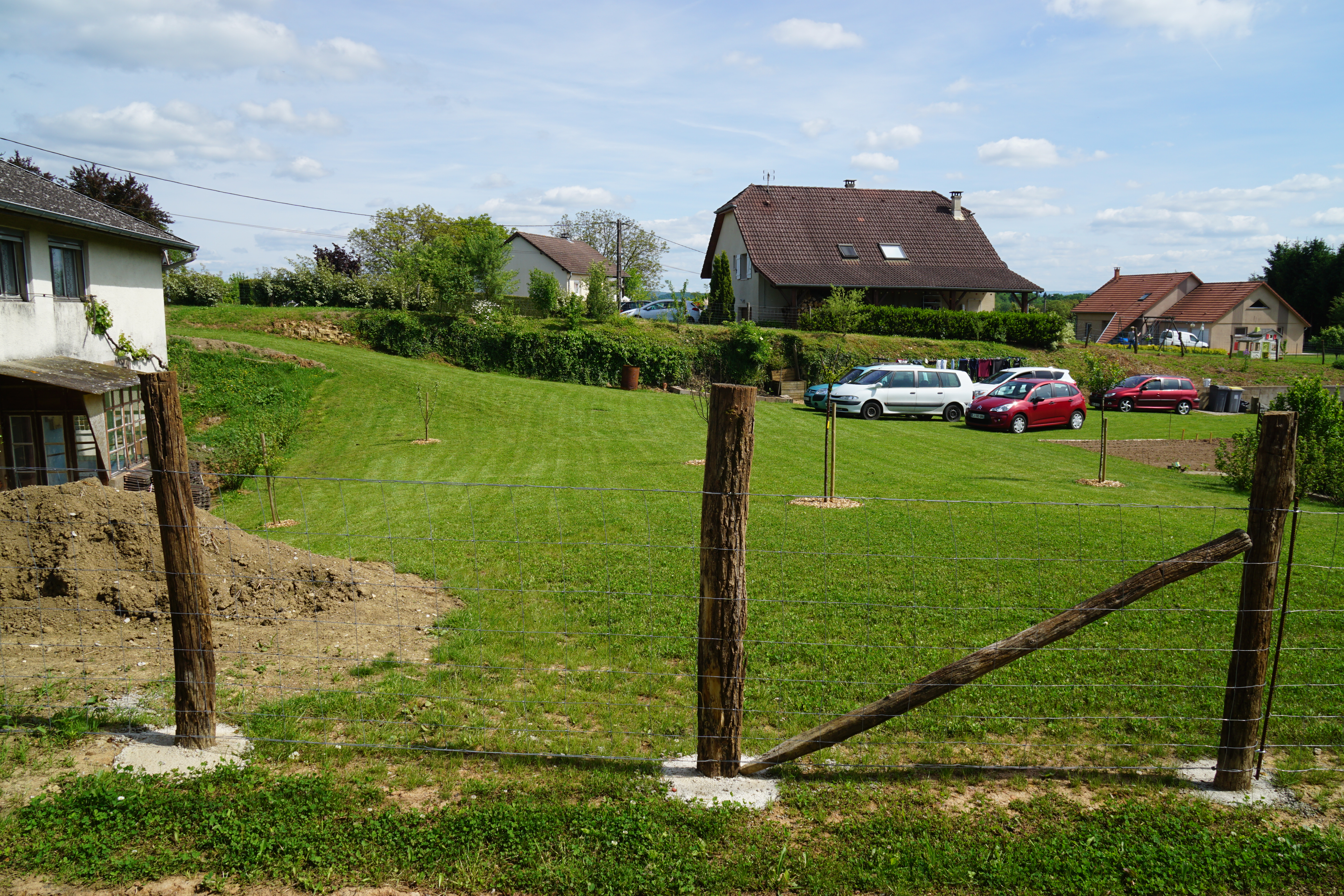
Location of Shaft V and its reworked spoil heap at the rear

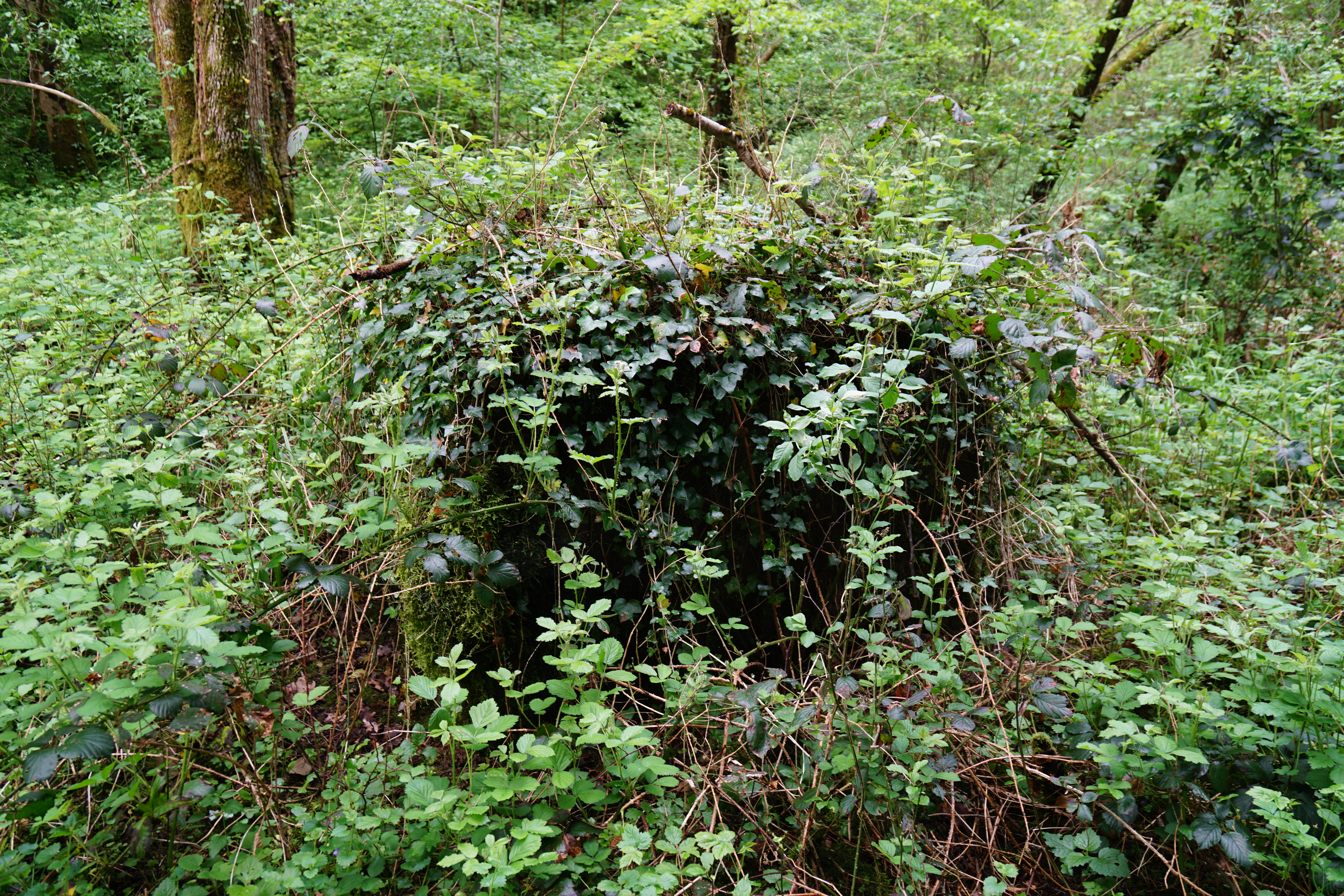
Borehole converted to drinking water supply

=== Vy-lès-Lure ===
A concession covering 973 hectares was granted on August 10, 1842, and a series of exploratory works were conducted in the hamlet of La Grange du Vau, situated between the communes of Vy-lès-Lure and Mollans. This hamlet is located to the southwest of the Saint-Germain concession (Stephanian Basin), which is the closest to it. Operations were conducted in two distinct periods: the first during the latter half of the nineteenth century and the early twentieth century, coinciding with the granting of a concession, and the second during the Nazi occupation, at the initiative of the BRGG (the predecessor of the BRGM).

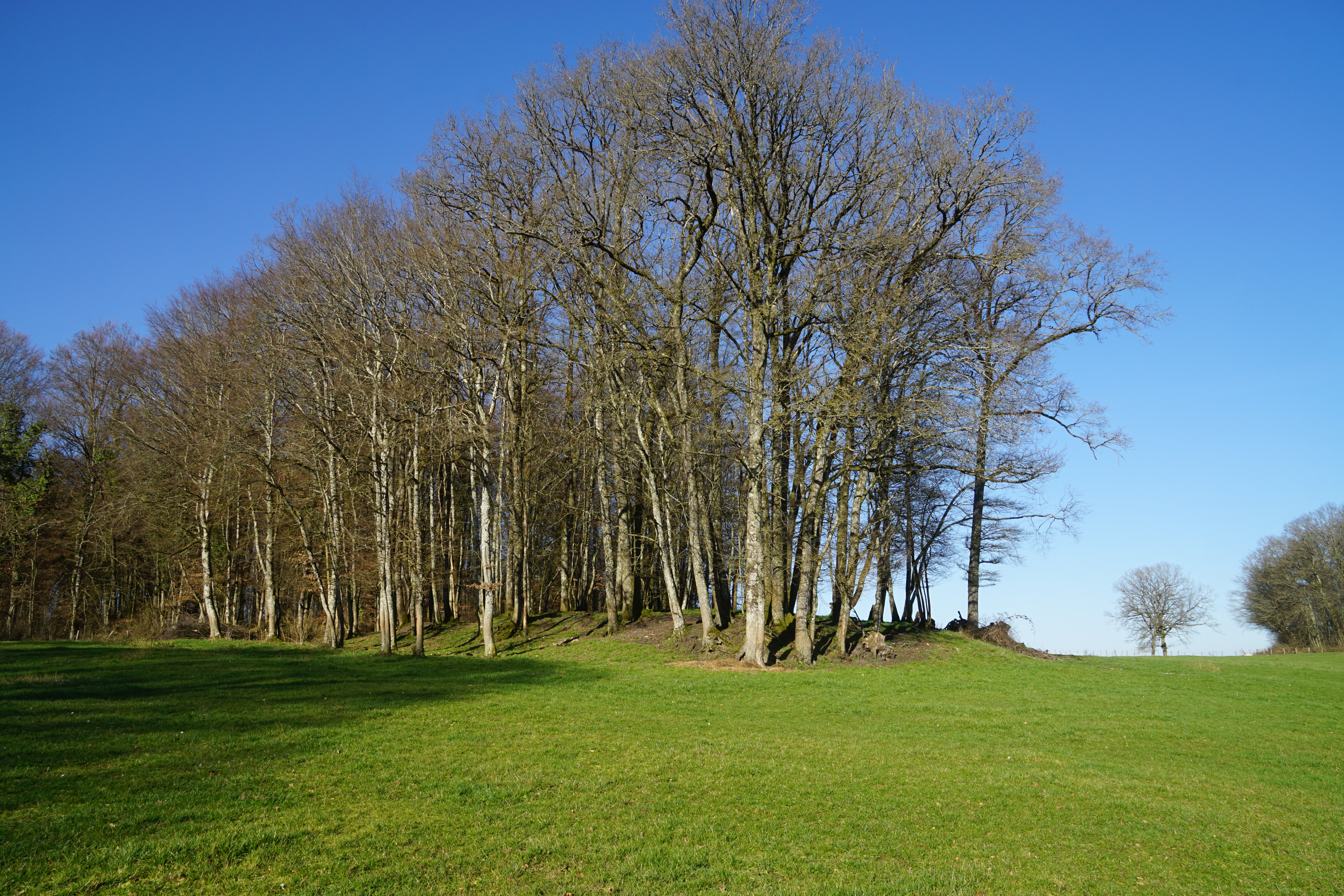
The Ghautier well slag heap

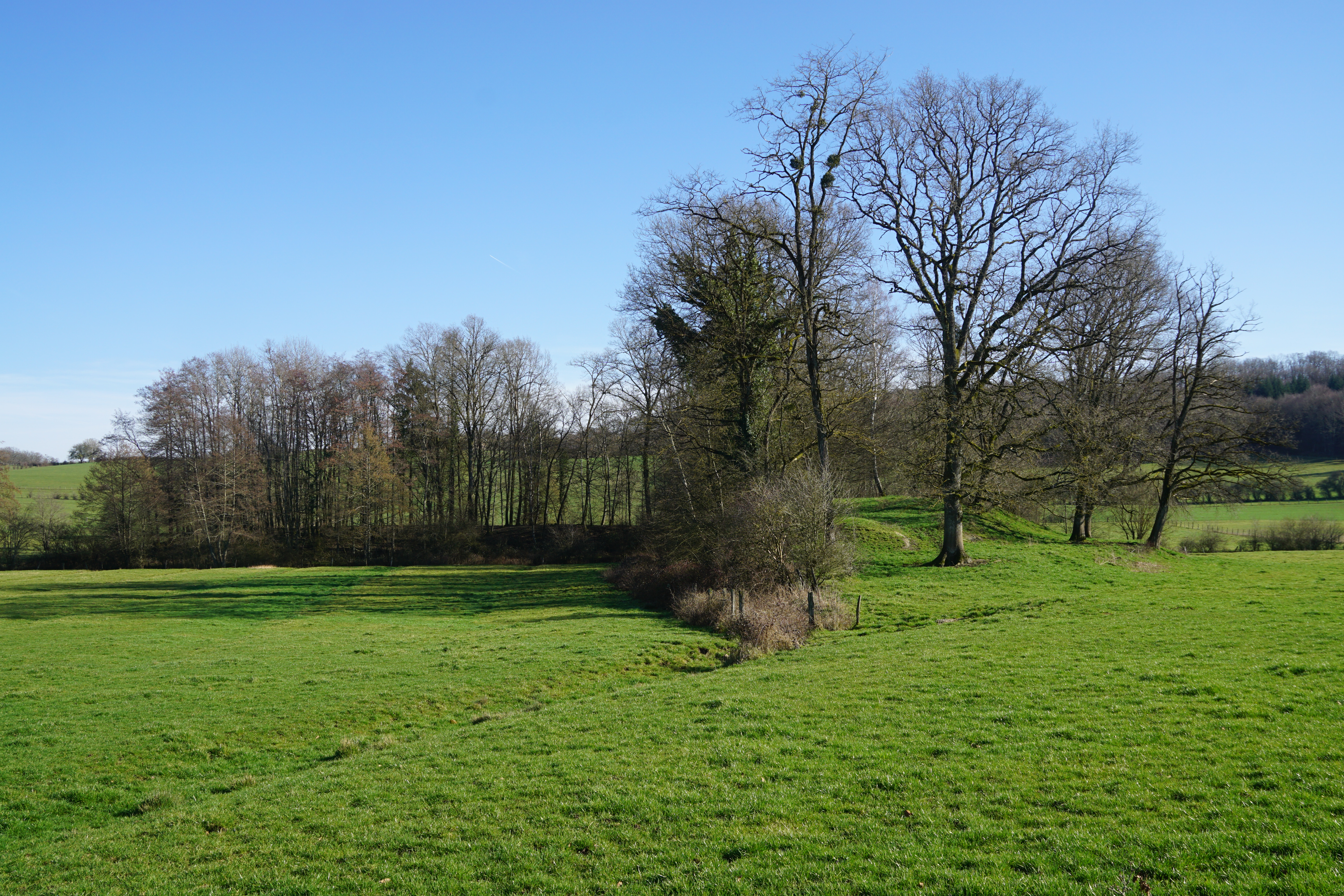
The Sainte-Barbe slag heap

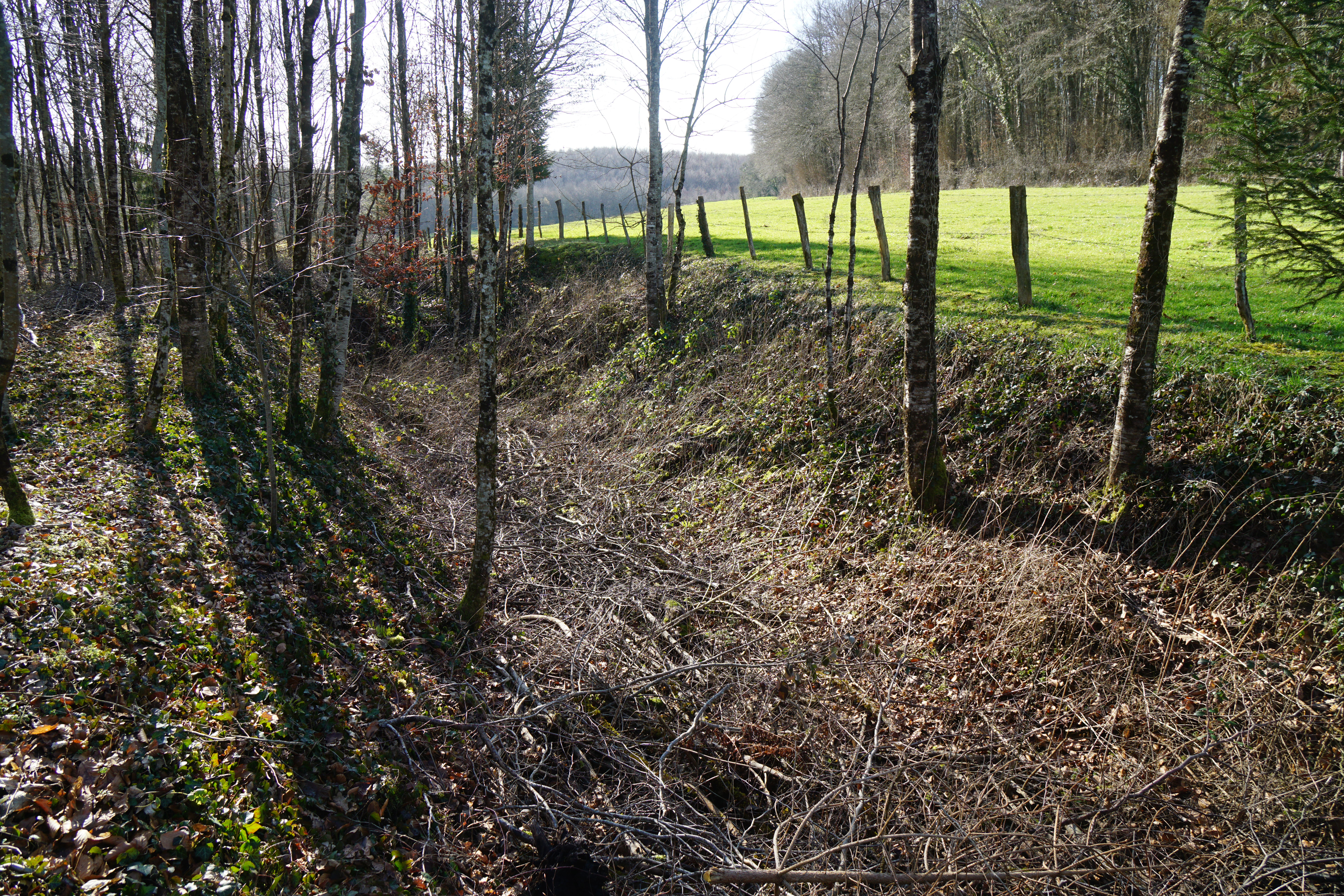
The access trench to the descending mine in 1942

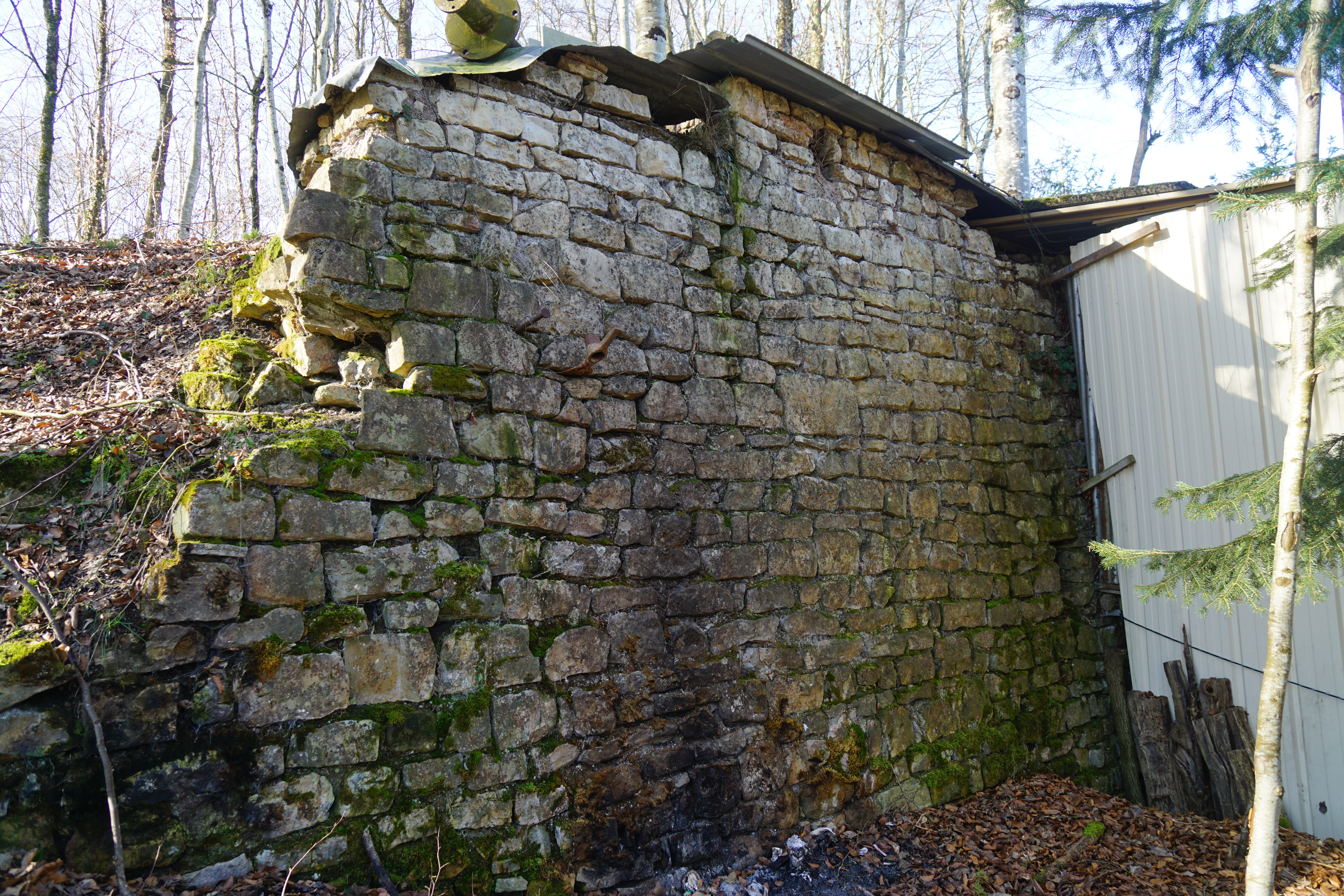
The wall of the descenderie slag heap

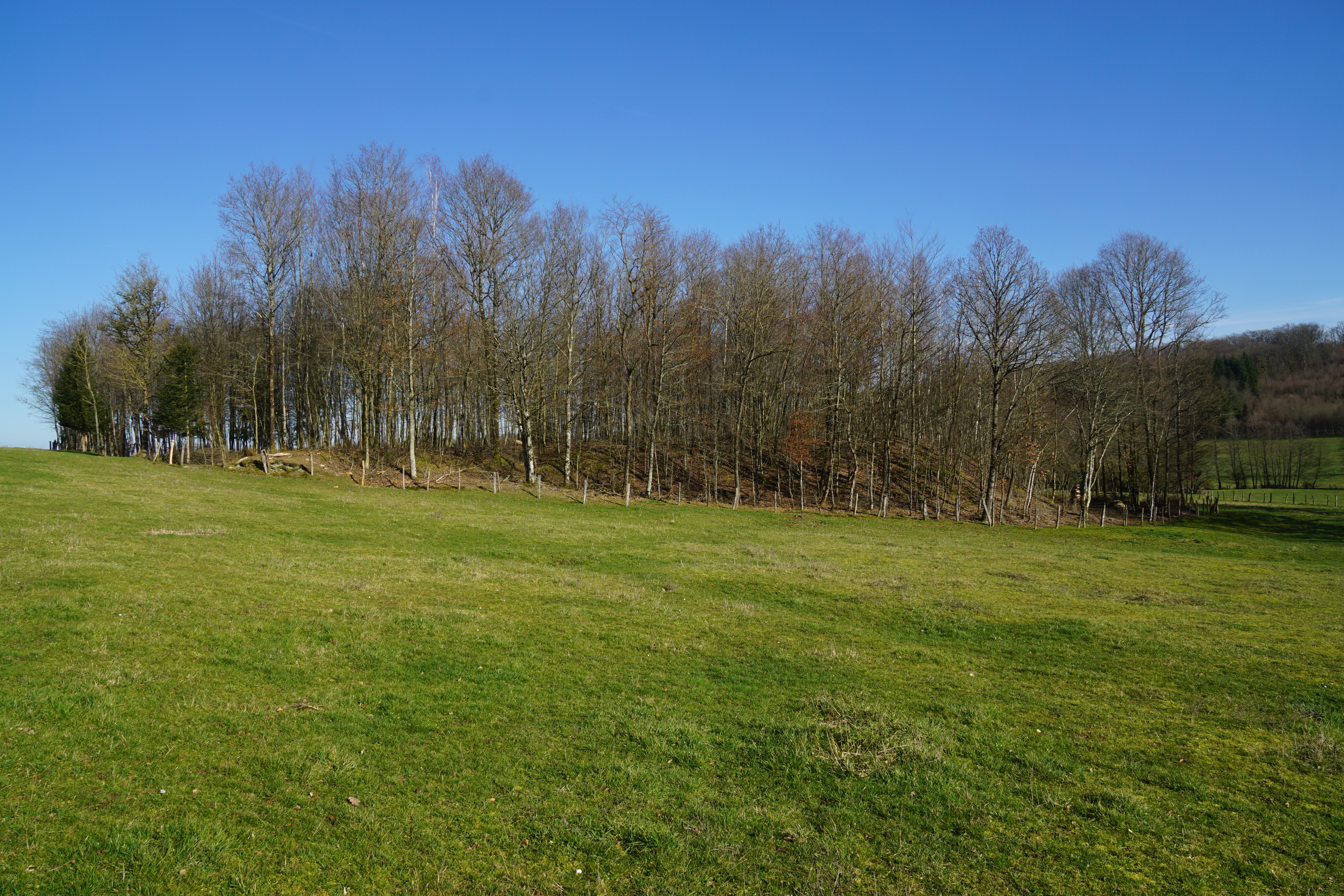
General view of the descenderie slag heap

=== Mélecey ===
The first documented reference to a coal mine in the area dates back to May 24, 1773, situated near the neighboring village of Abbenans. Coal exploration commenced in Mélecey in 1778 to supply saltworks that employed an evaporation system for brine. However, the quality of the extracted coal was deemed to be inadequate.

The Mélecey concession, encompassing an area of 480 hectares, was awarded on September 29, 1843, to extract salt and coal. Buissons-Brûlé primarily exploited the concession. In 1865, a firedamp explosion occurred in the Buissons-Brûlé mine, resulting in ten fatalities and leading to the cessation of coal extraction in the concession. The Gouhenans coal mines then supplied the saltworks until this activity ceased in 1872.

The majority of the concession's pits were situated within the Fallon woods. One of them was the source of a fire before 1943. The coal mining operations resulted in the creation of numerous modest spoil piles.

List of main extraction wells
| Name | Depth | Activity |
|---|---|---|
| Buissons-Brûlé shaft | 20 m | 1843 - 1865 |
| Le Cray shaft | 12.50 m | 1852 - 1853 |
| Saint-Pierre shaft | | 1855 - 1857 |
| Puits No. 4 | 9,30 m | 1861 - 1865 |
| Puits Buissons-Brûlé II | 23.10 m | 1862 - 1865 |

Remnants of the main pits.

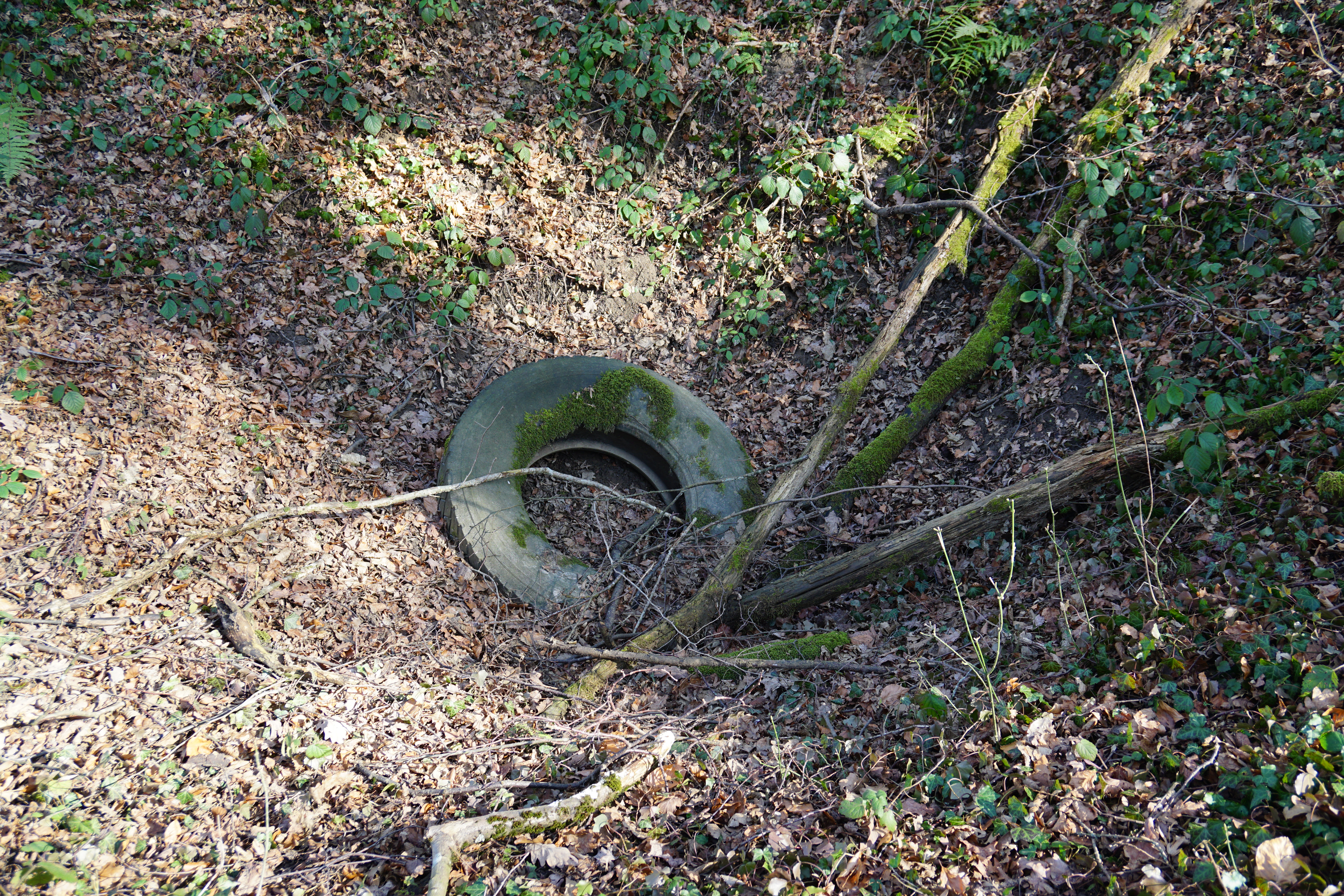
The Carlotte well

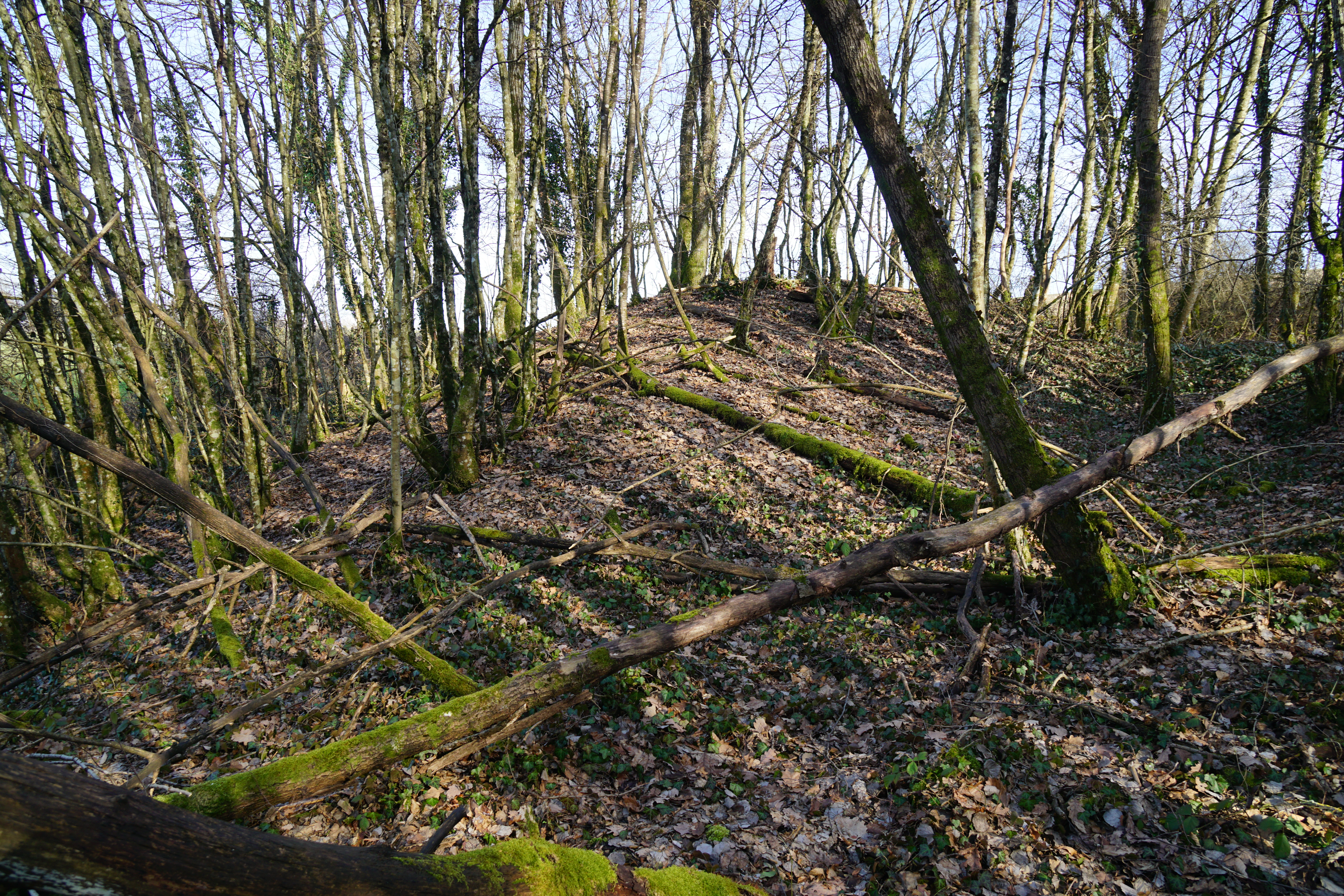
Saint-Pierre shaft slag heap

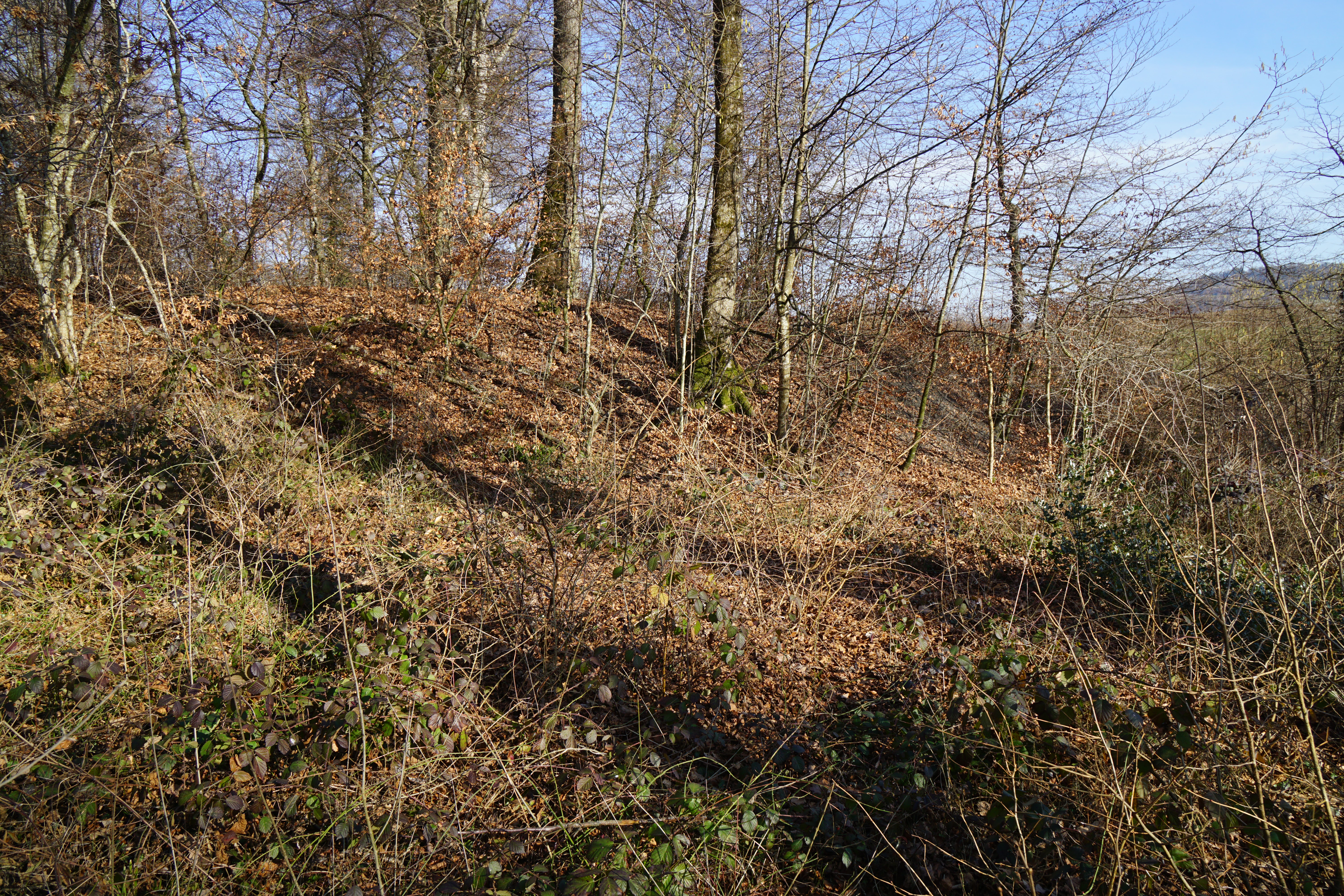
The Buissons-Brûlé slag heap

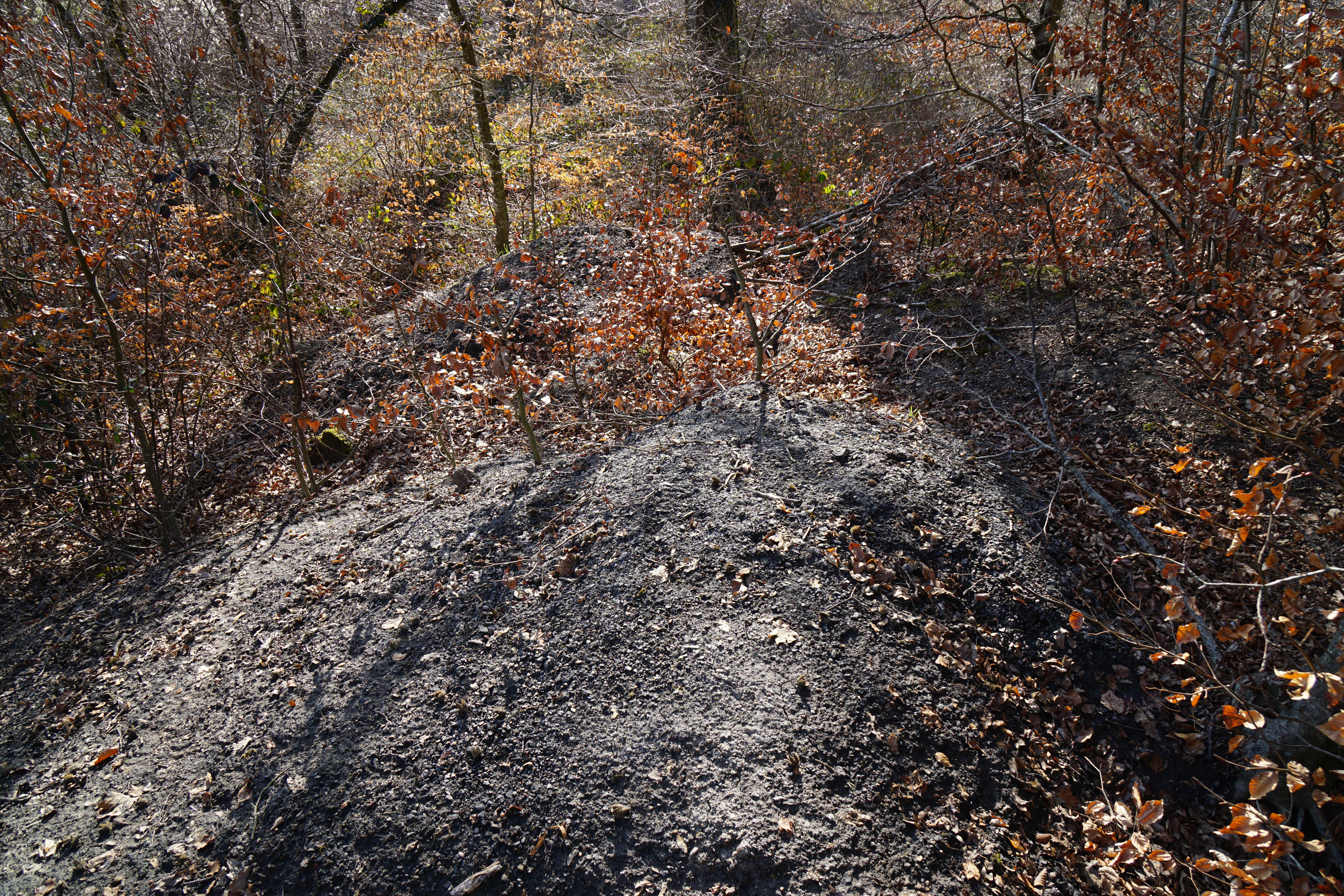
The rocks of the Buissons-Brûlé slag heap from the summit

=== Grozon ===
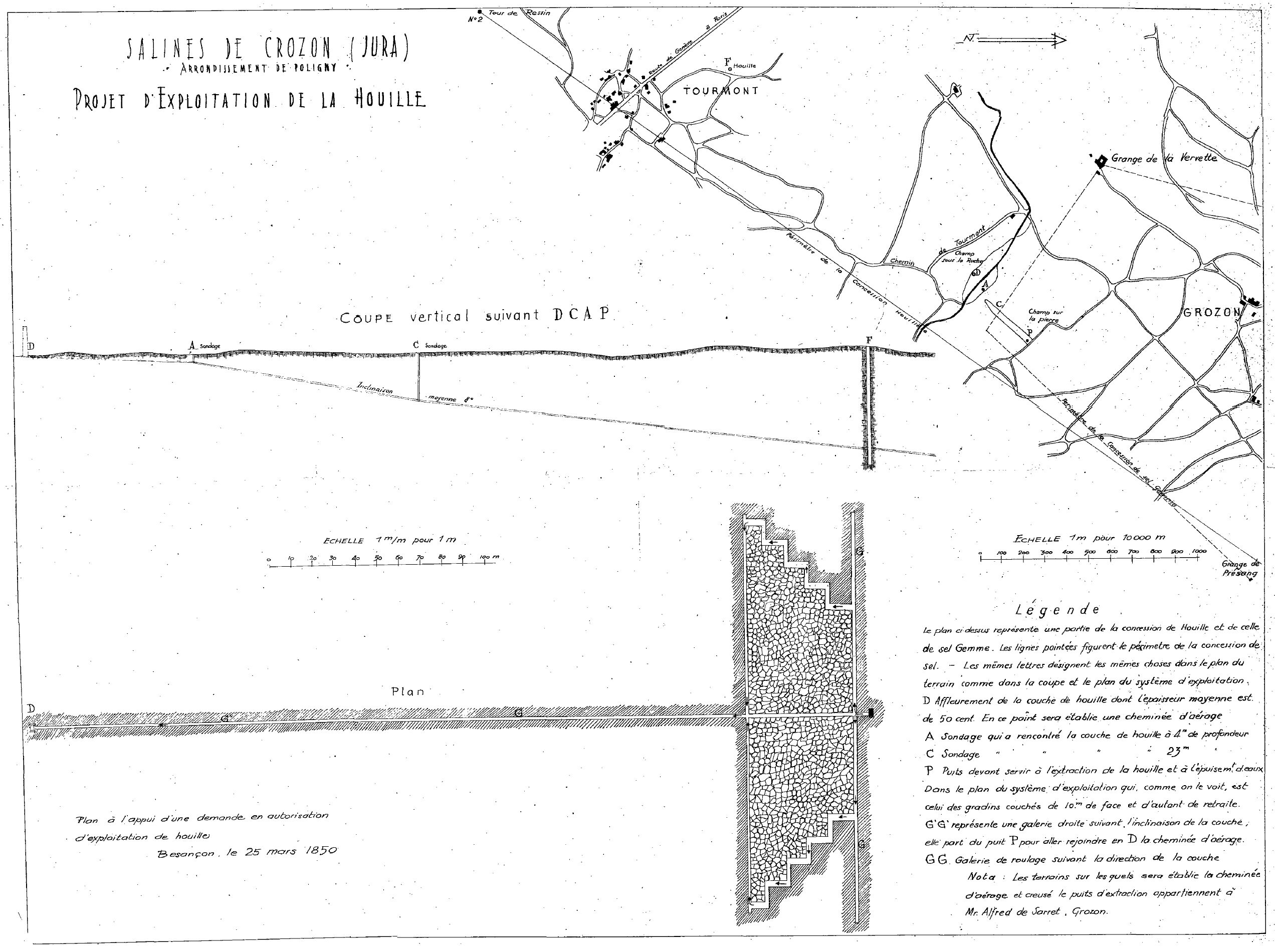
Plan in support of an application for authorization to mine coal by the Grozon saltworks

The Grozon concession, encompassing 1,100 hectares, was bestowed upon the proprietor on March 8, 1845, to supply the village's saltworks. This mine, which ceased operations before 1864, was the sole enterprise in the department engaged in coal exploitation.

The exploited deposit consisted of a single seam whose thickness varied from 40 to 80 cm. The coal was found to contain 73.21% carbon and 3.75% ash, and was very friable, necessitating the installation of supports in the galleries. Even after washing, the quality of the coal was found to be poor, with a low calorific value that resulted in poor combustion. These factors contributed to the cessation of exploitation.

In the 1940s, two declines were excavated, one to the north and one to the south of the valley. The coal seams were disrupted by numerous faults. The extraction of hard coal was conducted using explosives, and the resulting product was transported by rail to Villeneuve and Montmorot, as well as to the coal gas plant in Grenoble.

=== Merger ===
On March 14, 1879, a presidential decree merged the concessions of Gouhenans, Athesans, Vy-lès-Lure, and Saulnot.

In 1923, Mr. Gaillard, the duly appointed representative of the Gouhenans Industrial Mining Company, formally requested the relinquishment of the aforementioned concession. This request was ultimately granted on February 17, 1925.

The aggregate production of these concessions reached 1.16 million tons. In 1944, the estimated reserve of exploitable coal was 0.5 million tons.

== Works outside concessions ==
Explorations were conducted at a location designated as Le Breuil, situated within the administrative boundaries of Pont-sur-l'Ognon. The objective was to ascertain the feasibility of supplying the village forges that utilized Gémonval coal during the 1820s.

On May 20, 1826, during the inauguration of a modest quarry situated on the slopes of Mount Randon in Lure, a few minor coal veins were unearthed. Following a series of examinations, A departmental mining engineer posited that further exploration was imperative, a proposition that the municipal council proceeded to undertake. However, the results of this endeavor proved to be inconclusive.

In the early nineteenth century, a coal deposit was identified in the commune of La Creuse. However, it was not exploited due to its minimal size.

Two shafts were constructed to identify the presence of coal in the area. The first was dug close to the church and intersected a coal seam measuring 15 centimeters in thickness at a depth of 7 meters. The second shaft was sunk 200 meters to the northeast of the first and encountered a coal seam measuring 30 centimeters in thickness at a depth of 13 meters below the surface.

A decline was constructed in Champey to exploit the deposit via six ascending galleries. However, this proved to be an unworkable solution, and the project was ultimately abandoned. Attempts to restart operations were unsuccessful on several occasions. In 1837, a 100-meter-deep borehole was drilled, which encountered coal, gypsum at 34 meters, and salt.

Excavations were conducted on the surface between Chavanne and Villers-sur-Saulnot.

In approximately 1880, the Franche-Comté Ironworks Company of Fraisans initiated the excavation of a hillside decline in Ougney-Douvot. The project was subsequently resumed in 1920.

== Production and reserves ==
The aggregate production of the Haute-Saône concessions reached 1.16 million tons. After operations in 1944, the estimated reserve of exploitable coal was 0.5 million tons.

Evolution of Coal Mining in the Gémonval Basin (including Saulnot and Gouhenans)
| | 1911 | 1912 | 1913 | 1914 | 1915 | 1916 | 1917 | 1918 | 1919 | 1920 | 1921 |
|---|---|---|---|---|---|---|---|---|---|---|---|
| Production (approximate) in thousands of tons | 5.7 | 6.5 | 7.5 | 8.75 | 6 | 3.1 | 9.5 | 10.6 | 5.2 | 3.9 | 0.95 |

== See also ==
- Vosges and Jura coal mining basins
- Mining basin of Ronchamp and Champagney

== Bibliography ==
- Société d'agriculture, lettres, sciences et arts de la Haute-Saône (1831). Recueil agronomique, industriel et scientifique (in French). Vol. 3–4. pp. 345–351. Archived from the original on December 12, 2024.
- Laurens, A (1841). Annuaire départemental du Doubs (in French). pp. 129–131. Archived from the original on September 2, 2024.
- Ebelman (1855). Recueil des travaux scientifiques de M. Ebelman (in French). Vol. 2. pp. 83–91. Archived from the original on April 21, 2023.
- Resal, Henri-Amé (1864). Statistique géologique, minéralogique et minéralurgique des départements du Doubs et du Jura (in French). pp. 84–87. Archived from the original on December 12, 2024.
- Suchaux, L (1866). La Haute-Saône : dictionnaire historique, topographique et statistique des communes du département (in French). Archived from the original on July 18, 2024.
- Thirria, Édouard (1869). Manuel à l'usage de l'habitant du département de la Haute-Saône (in French). pp. 182–186. Archived from the original on April 22, 2022.
- Fournier, Eugène (1907). Les Recherches de houille en Franche-Comté, le massif de Saulnot et sa bordure (feuilles de Montbéliard et Lure) (in French). Société géologique de France.
- Dormois, R; Ricours, J (1943). Houille triasique sur le versant N.O. du Jura (PDF) (in French). BRGM. Archived from the original on August 11, 2024.
- Ricours, J (1944a). Etude géologique du bassin de Gémonval (PDF) (in French). BRGM. Archived from the original on December 12, 2024.
- Ricours, J (1944b). Concession d'Athesans : travaux pour recherche et exploitation de houille triasique (PDF) (in French). Vol. 2. BRGM. Archived from the original on December 12, 2024.
- Semonin, Pierre. Le gîte houiller de Villafans. pp. fr.
- BRGM (1998). Ancienne concession de houille de Vy-lès-Lure (70) : Etat des lieux (PDF) (in French). Vol. 2. Archived from the original on September 3, 2024.
- Benoit, Paul (1999). Le Charbon de Terre en Europe Occidentale Avant L'usage Industriel Du Coke (in French). Archived from the original on August 9, 2022.
- Sommaruga, Anna (2000). Géologie du Jura central et du bassin molassique : nouveaux aspects d'une chaîne d'avant-pays plissée et décollée sur des couches d'évaporites [Geology of the central Jura and the molasse basin : new insight into an evaporite-based foreland fold and thrust belt]. Neuchâtel: Société neuchâteloise des Sciences naturelles. ISBN 2-88347-001-4. Archived from the original on December 14, 2024.
- Koch-Mathian, J. Y (2001). Inventaire des anciennes mines du département de la Haute-Saône (in French). DRIRE Franche-Comté.
- Morin, Denis (2008). "La saline de Melecey-Fallon (Haute-Saône). Traditions et innovations techniques dans la fabrication du sel au XIXe siècle… Quand le bois remplace le charbon de terre". Sel, eau, forêt. D'hier à aujourd'hui (in French). Besançon: Presses universitaires de Franche-Comté. pp. 479–504. doi:10.4000/books.pufc.25777. ISBN 978-2-84867-230-4.
- Bichet, Vincent; Campy, Michel (2009). Montagnes du Jura : Géologie et paysages (in French) (2nd ed.). Besançon: Néo Éditions. ISBN 978-2-914741-61-3.
- Paygnard, Marc (2010). La Haute-Saône guide découverte (in French). Éditions Noires Terres.
- Bregnard, Michel (2010). Les Vosges saônoises de A à Z (in French). Saint-Cyr-sur-Loire: Éditions Alan Sutton. ISBN 978-2-8138-0168-5.
- Trebuck, A (2013). Étude détaillée des aléas et mouvements de terrain du district minier de Gémonval et Le Vernoy (25) (in French). Géoderis.
