= Vy-lès-Lure coal mines =

French coal mines

Coal Mines of Vy-lès-Lure
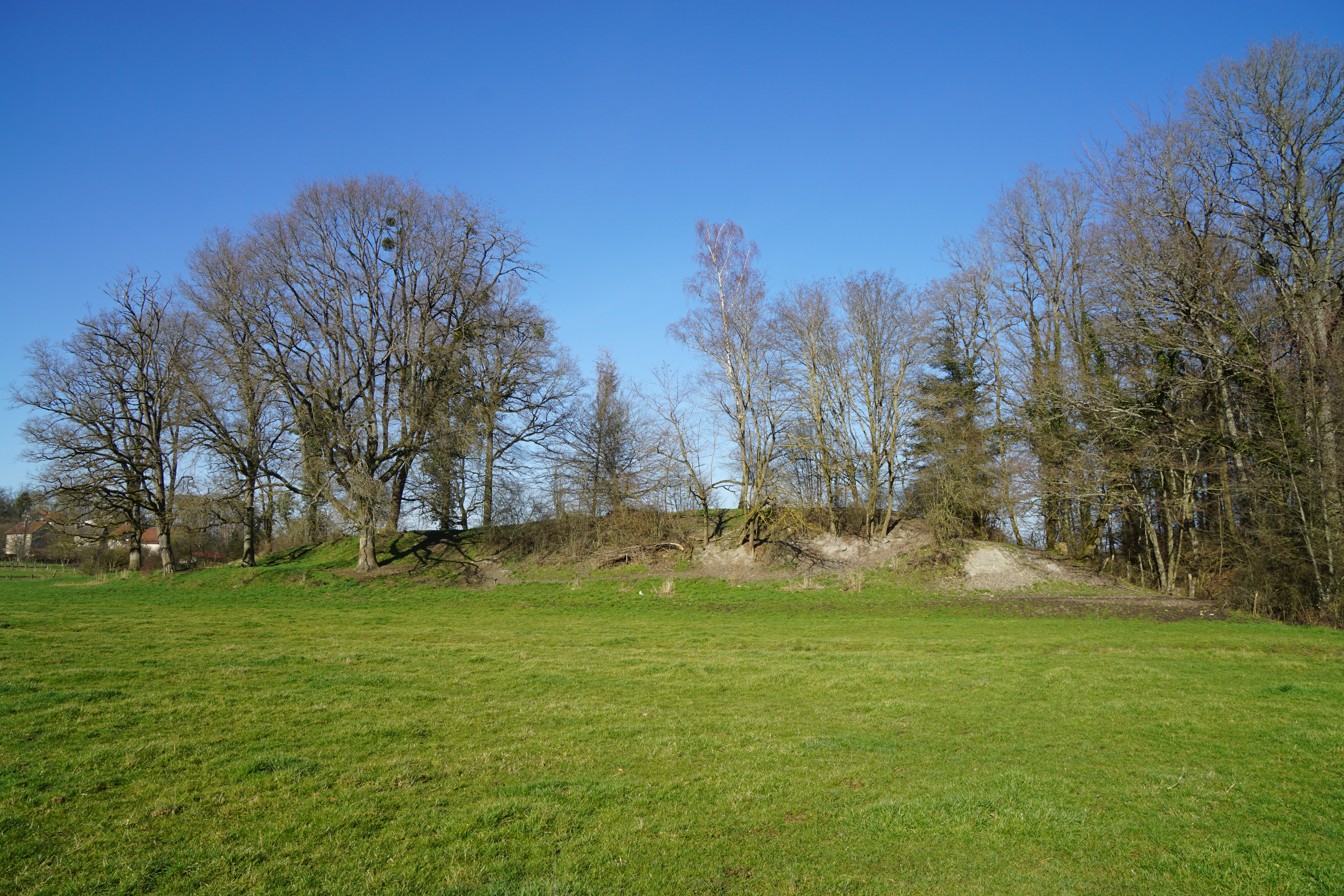
- The Sainte-Barbe slag heap, one of the main remains of the mining operations.
- Founded: 1853
- Defunct: 1944
- Headquarters: Vy-lès-Lure, France
- Products: Bituminous coal
- Footnotes / references Key dates: 1839: discovery of coal. 1842: concession agreement. 1879: merger with Gouhenans, Athesans and Saulnot. 1905: first closure. 1942: relaunch of operations.

The coal mines of Vy-lès-Lure are a mining extraction site in eastern France, located in Haute-Saône, in the hamlet of Grange du Vau between the communes of Vy-lès-Lure and Mollans. The site experienced two periods of activity: the first between 1826 and 1905, following the granting of a concession in 1842; and the second during the 1940s by the Bureau of Geological and Geophysical Research (BRGG). The Keuper coal was primarily used to power boilers employed in concentrating brine at local saltworks, particularly at Gouhenans, which owned the Vy-lès-Lure concession between 1879 and 1925.

Remnants of this activity (mine entrances, spoil heaps, and a mining village) still exist in the early 21st century.

== Location ==
The concession covered an area of 973 hectares, primarily distributed across the communes of Vy-lès-Lure and Mollans, but also including Amblans and Genevreuille. Extraction took place on the border between Vy-lès-Lure and Mollans, in the hamlet of Grange du Vau located 25 km east of Vesoul, in the department of Haute-Saône, within the French region of Bourgogne-Franche-Comté.

The various concessions in Haute-Saône for the exploitation of the Keuper basin.

== Geology ==
The coal deposit exploited is part of the Keuper coal basin of Haute-Saône. It consists of a stratiform layer dating from the Upper Triassic. The coal-bearing terrain is characterized by clay shale and black marl. The thickness of the seam varies between 0.55 meters and 1.10 meters, and its depth ranges from 3.50 meters to 67.35 meters. The seam dips at an angle of 8% toward the south.

The coal consists of 10.09% ash, 12.96% moisture, 24.29% volatile matter, and 52.66% carbon. The coal is of soft type, and the coke derived from it has a metallic appearance.

== History ==
=== Discovery ===
Exploration work was undertaken by two different groups of entrepreneurs around 1826 on outcrops located 1.2 km apart. On January 8, 1828, the partners Ferrier from Luxeuil and Klengk from Vy-lès-Lure submitted a concession request, which remained unanswered.

In 1839, a shaft 19 meters deep was sunk by Messrs. Ghautier and Company in the commune of Mollans, 700 meters southwest of Grange du Vau. It revealed coal seams 65 cm thick interspersed with 15 cm of clay, enabling a concession request. That same year, they were authorized to sell the coal extracted from exploratory work, but not yet to begin commercial exploitation.

This company and its competitor had also previously dug four other shafts. In October 1838, a 13-meter-deep shaft (5.5 meters of which was a sump) reached a seam with a thickness varying from 66 to 80 cm at a depth of 7.5 meters. This shaft included a 30-meter-long adit intersected by five others. Another shaft, 22 meters deep, struck coal at 17.5 meters and had an adit 10 meters long. On April 17, 1837, another shaft dug to a depth of 28 meters encountered three seams of 5, 16, and 32 cm. It was abandoned the following June. Finally, a shaft named Conrad, dug by another group, collapsed at 23 meters depth.

=== Concession ===
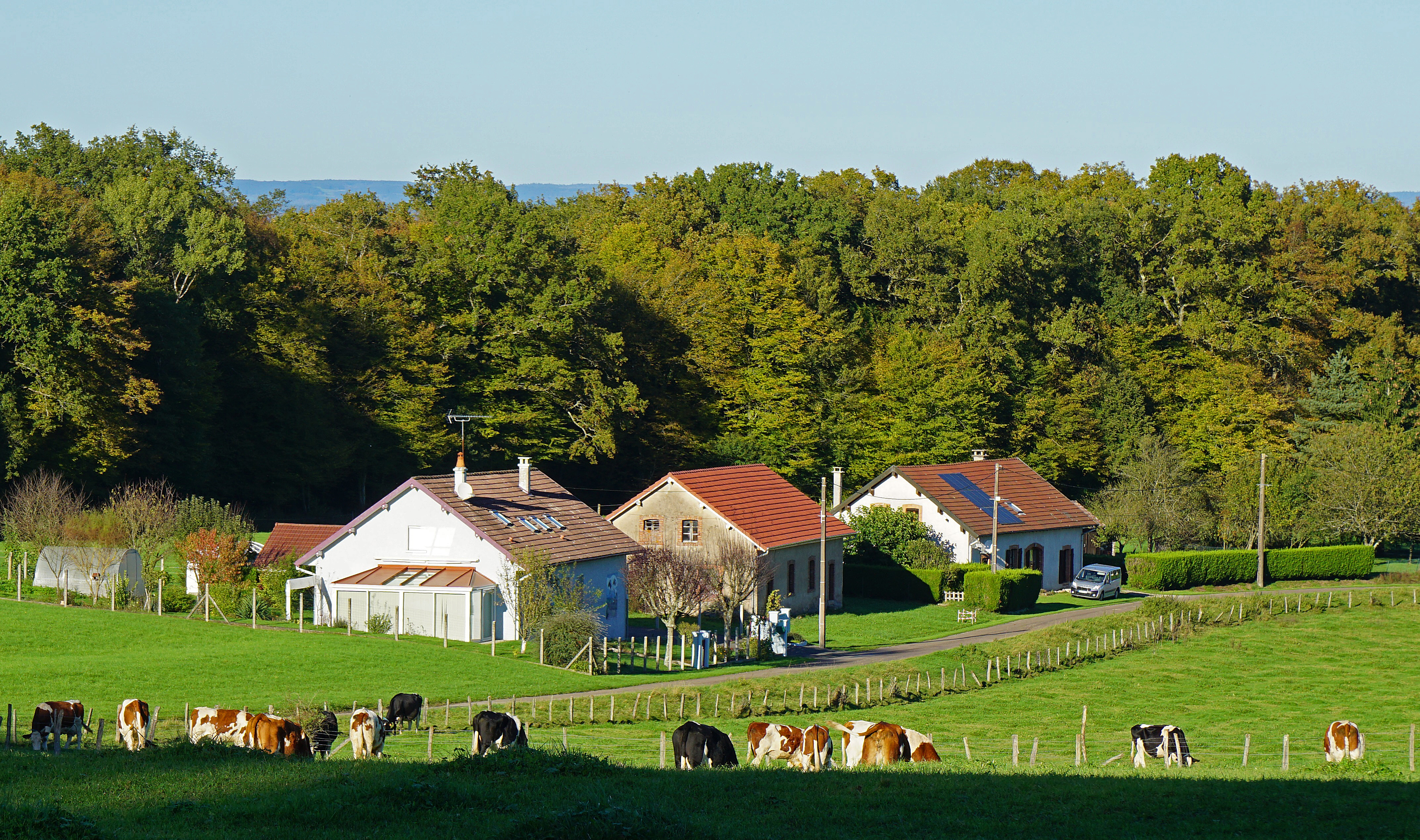
A former mining town near the Driole shaft.

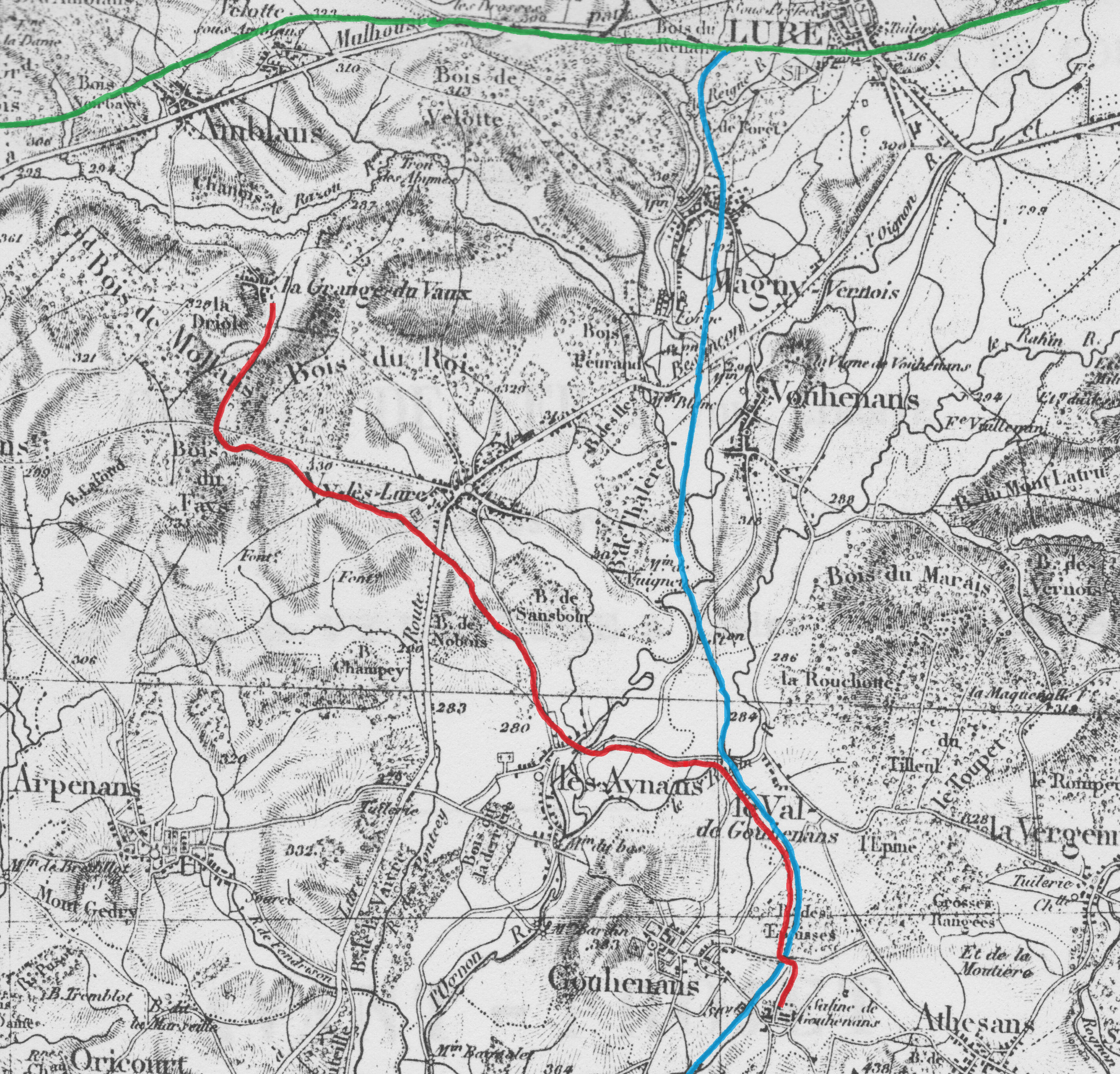
Map of the proposed railway line between the collieries of Vy-lès-Lure and the saltworks of Gouhenans (cancelled and replaced by a link to Magny-Vernois station). Line from Paris-Est to Mulhouse-Ville Line from Montbozon to Lure Proposed line

The concession was granted on August 10, 1842, to Messrs. Favre, Conrod, Sallot, and Didier, but no exploitation took place before 1853 due to the bankruptcy of Ghautier's company. The Sallot company resumed work on a rectangular shaft 19 meters deep (1.7 meters by 1.9 meters in section), giving access to a square timbered adit 72 meters long, intersected by another adit 10 meters long. The seam was 70 cm thick. Mr. Ghautier demanded 4,000 francs in compensation for the work already carried out, but Mr. Sallot offered him 460 francs. On August 13, 1853, the concession was sold to Messrs. Tissot and Couvreux. It was subsequently resold in 1856 to Mr. de Grimaldi.

From 1856 to 1860, coal was extracted from the Sallot and Gauthier shafts as well as from the Saint-Jean adit. In 1856, 1,012 tons of coal were extracted. From 1896 to 1906, the Driole and Misère shafts and the Sainte-Barbe adit were the active mines. Between 1854 and 1902, eighteen shafts less than 20 meters deep and twelve boreholes between 10 and 70 meters encountered coal. In 1858, four-fifths of the production was used by the Mélecey saltworks to evaporate brine. The four concessions of Vy-lès-Lure, Gouhenans, Athesans, and Saulnot were merged by presidential decree on March 14, 1879, to exploit coal.

In December 1899, the 91 mine workers, including 30 miners, went on strike over a wage reform. On July 23, 1900, the construction of a 10 km narrow-gauge railway between the mines and the Magny-Vernois station by the Société des Salines, Houillères et Fabriques de Produits Chimiques de Gouhenans was declared of public utility. Until then, coal used by the saltworks had been transported by wagon to this station. The 5 km track was completed in 1901, at which point annual production rose to 12,300 tons compared to 9,445 the previous year, with a workforce of 112 workers, including 84 working underground. In 1904, the Driole sector was exhausted, and production fell to 7,585 tons compared to 10,016 the previous year. Workforce numbers also declined from 79 to around 50 workers. Daily wages ranged from 2 to 6 francs for adults and 1.75 to 2 francs for young apprentices (galibots). Of the 1904 production, 282 tons were sold (mainly to Jura saltworks), while the rest was blended with two-thirds Anzin or Bruay coal to fuel the Gouhenans saltworks’ furnaces. In 1905, 6,900 tons were produced and entirely consumed by the saltworks before mining operations at Vy-lès-Lure were abandoned in favor of restarting operations at Gouhenans and Saulnot. This decision was taken by management due to the poor quality of the coal, the cost of its transportation, and the unsuccessful exploration of new workable zones. At that time, 45 workers were employed at Vy-lès-Lure.

In 1923, Mr. Gaillard, the representative of the Mining and Industrial Company of Gouhenans, submitted a request to relinquish the concession. This relinquishment was decreed on February 17, 1925.

=== Revival ===
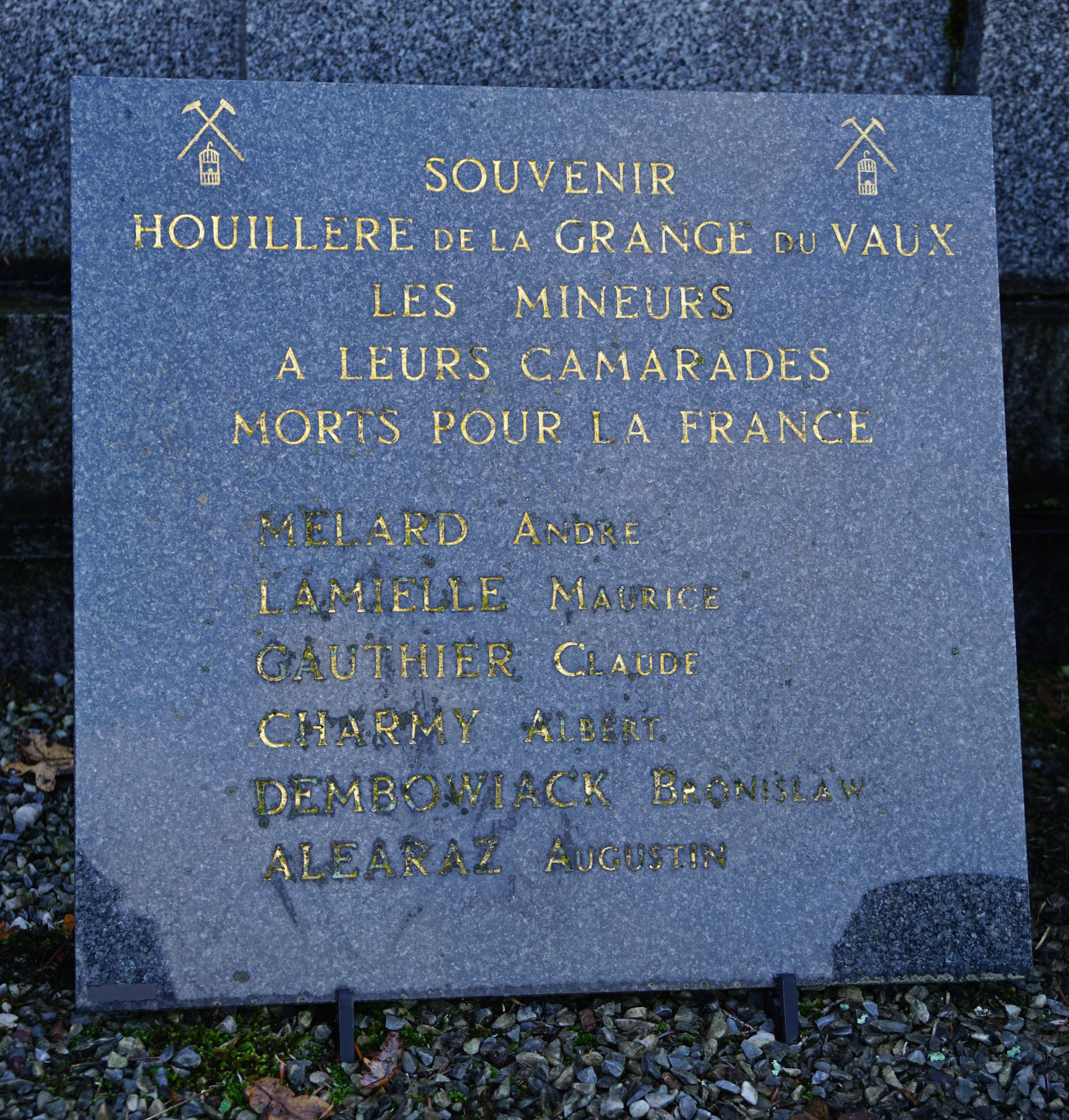
Plaque to the miners of the Granges-du-Vau coal mines who died for France during the Second World War.

To cope with shortages caused by the Occupation, new explorations were launched by the Bureau of Geological and Geophysical Research (BRGG) between 1942 and 1943; as in other small basins that escaped the occupier’s production quotas. Forty-five reconnaissance boreholes and an extraction incline were dug during this period. The incline was dug 5 meters from the edge of the Driole woods with a 30° slope and struck coal at a depth of 5 meters, southeast of the Saint-Jean fault. Mining operations lasted from 1942 to 1944 to supply the Gouhenans saltworks. The Gémonval concession was also revived, but not the one at Corcelles. The fuel, present in an 80 cm thick seam, was extracted via side drifts measuring 10 to 50 meters in length on either side of the main aditt down to a depth of 20 meters. In 1942, production averaged 20 tons per day (or 800 kg per worker) and 5,000 tons for the full year. The coal was loaded into trucks before being used in the saltworks’ boilers. From December 1942 to January 1943, 350 tons were extracted, with the production rate falling to 7 tons per day.

=== Post-mining ===
In 1998, the Bureau of Geological and Mining Research (BRGM) studied the mining remnants as part of Operation 97 G 344. The aim was to determine whether safety or decontamination measures were necessary; this ultimately proved not to be the case. Remnants remain and are listed in the report.

== Works ==
=== Mine shafts ===
List of Shafts
Excavation Period	Name	Depth	Thickness of the Seam	Remains	Location
From 1837	Old shafts			Overgrown woodland and holes, one of which measures 3 meters in diameter and 2 meters deep.	47.656480°N 6.417268°E
1854	Ghautier shaft	18 m	55 cm	A hole blocked by branches and a flat spoil heap.	47.658713°N 6.411195°E
1900	Misère shaft	13.6 m	70 cm		47.656085°N 6.420711°E
1902	Driole shaft	18.5 m	55 cm	A long and narrow spoil heap.	47.660122°N 6.412362°E
?	Gannot shaft	8 m	75 cm		47.660917°N 6.407440°E
?	Sallot shaft	9 m	? m	A small spoil heap.	47.660378°N 6.418312°E
?	Sainte-Barbe shaft	? m	? m		47.660372°N 6.416451°E

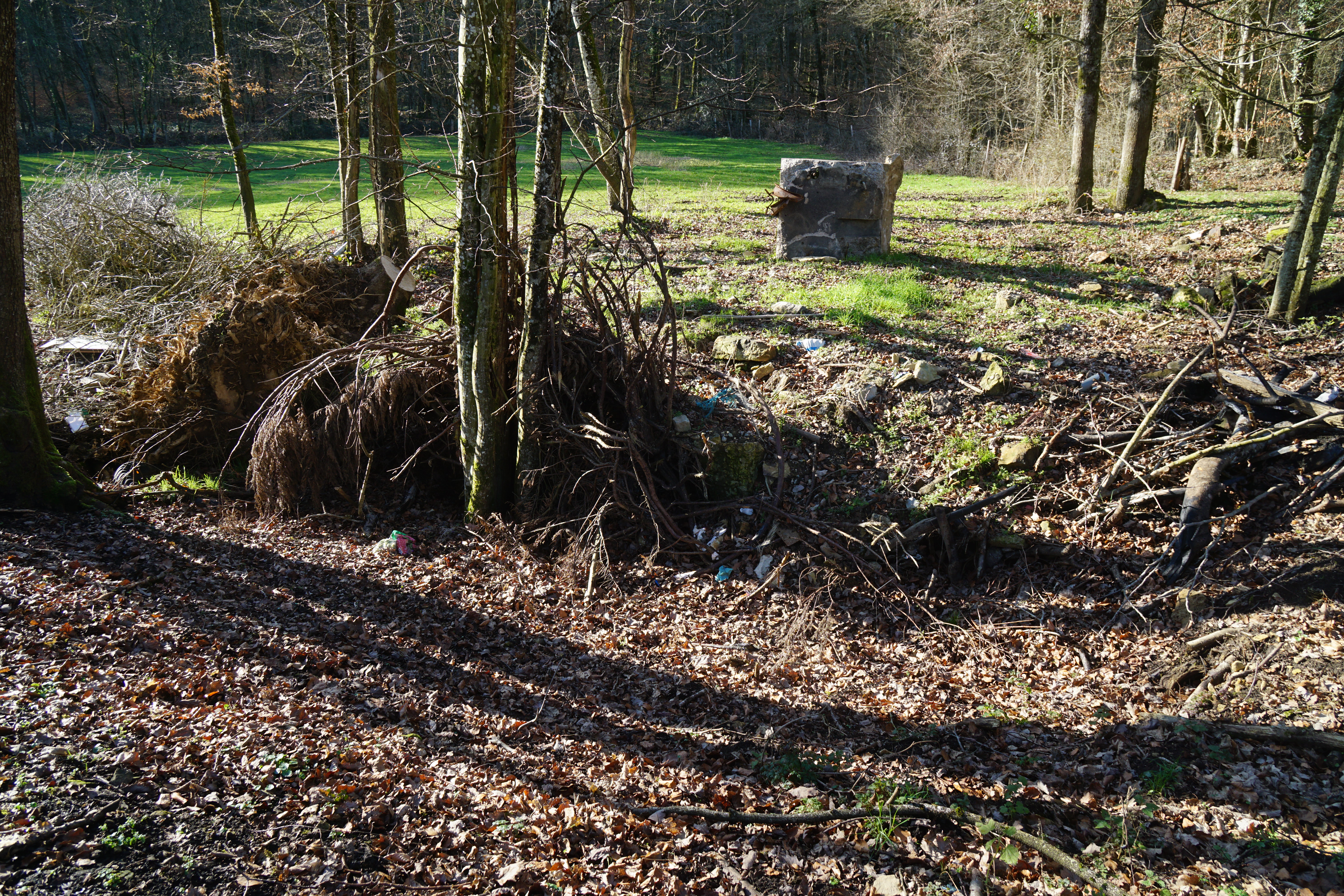
The Ghautier well.

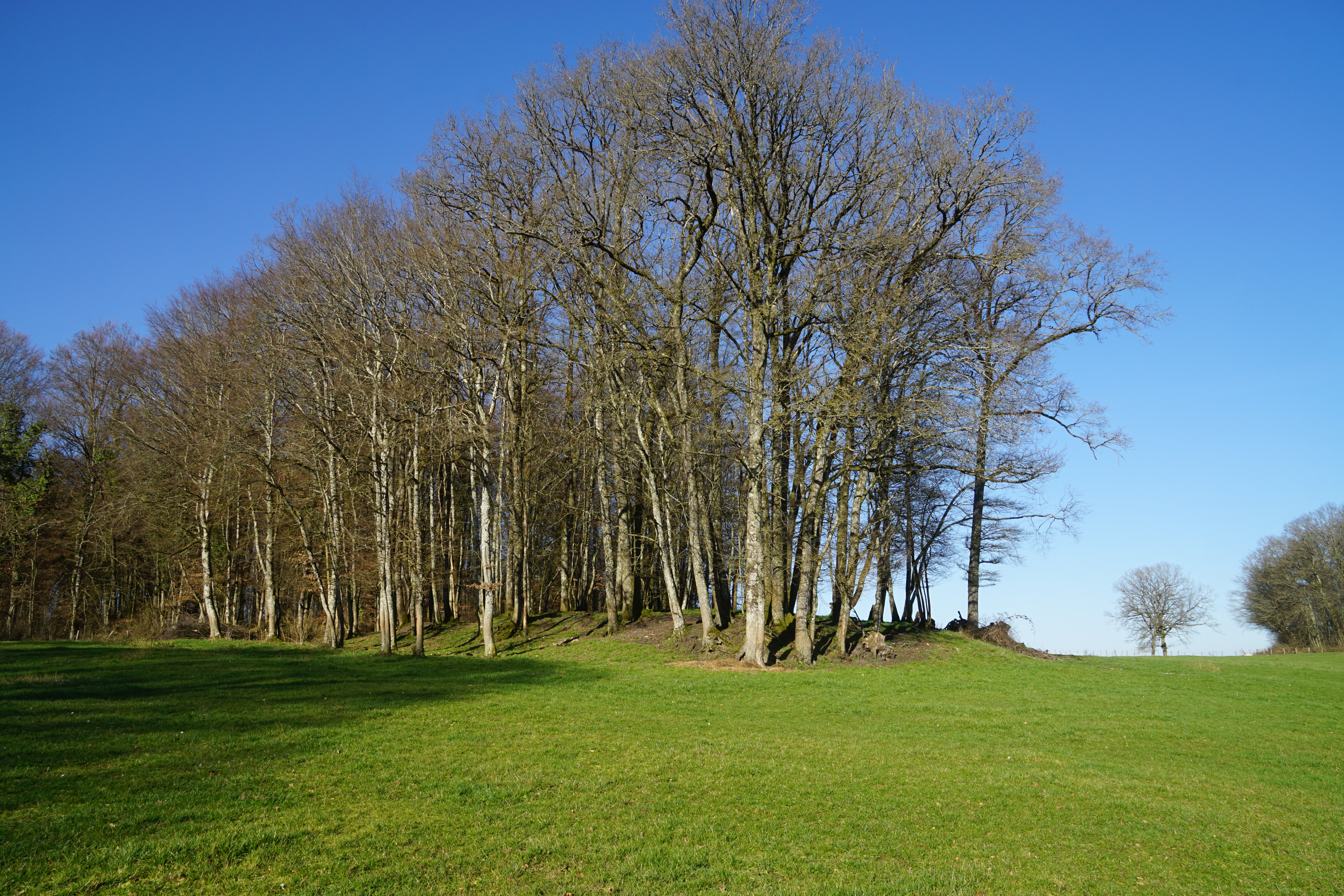
The slag heap of the Ghautier well.

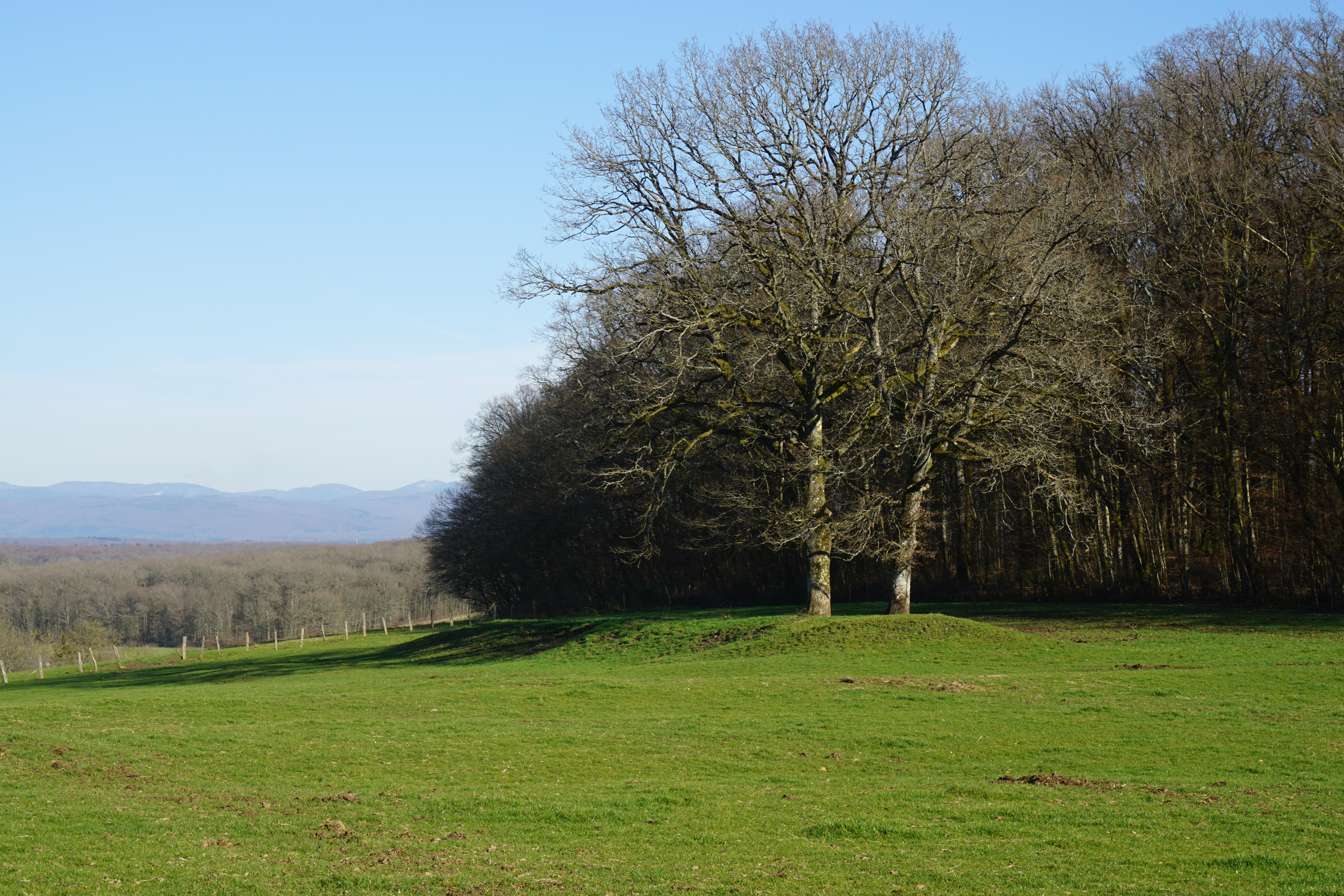
The slag heap of the Driole well.

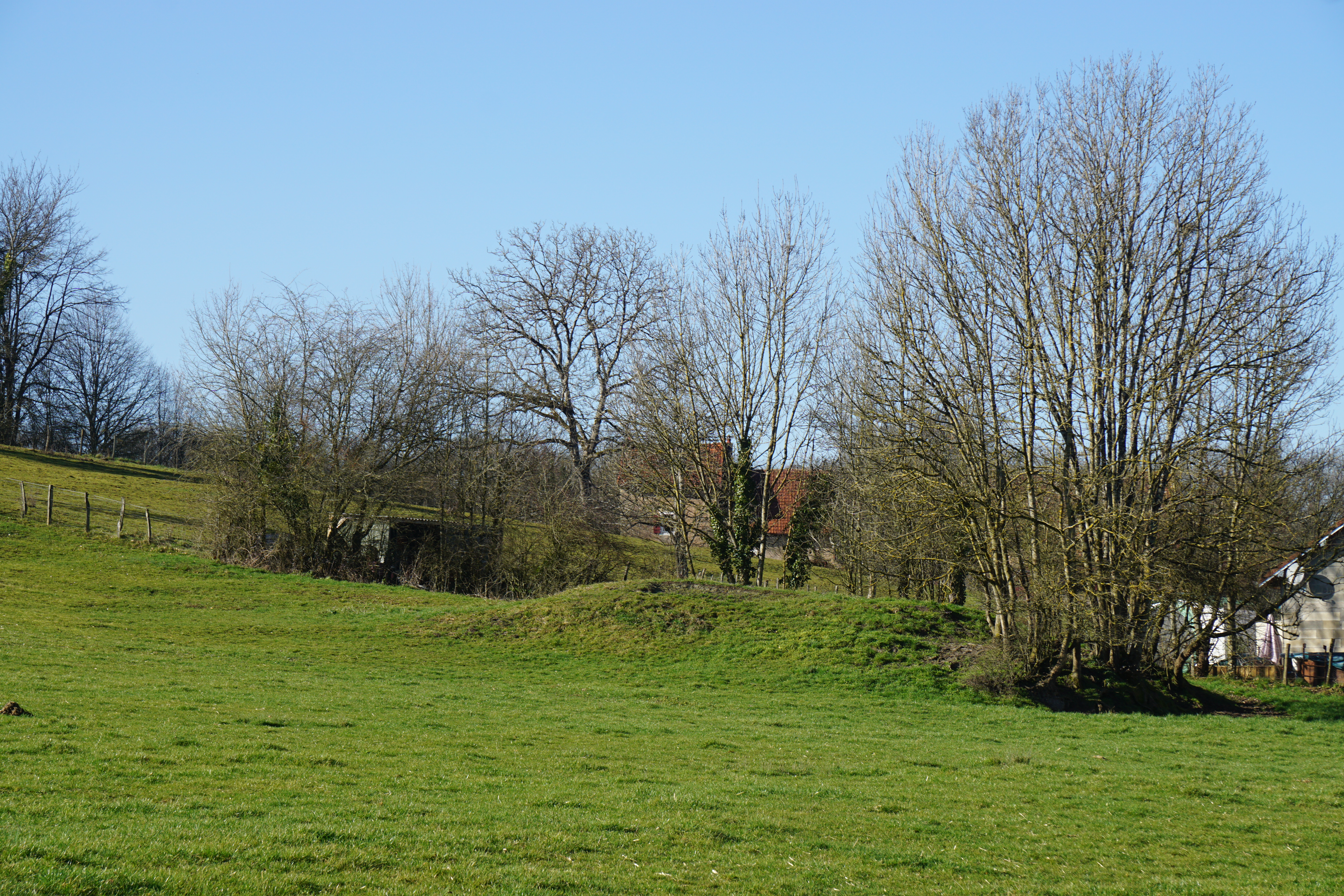
The slag heap of the Sallot well.

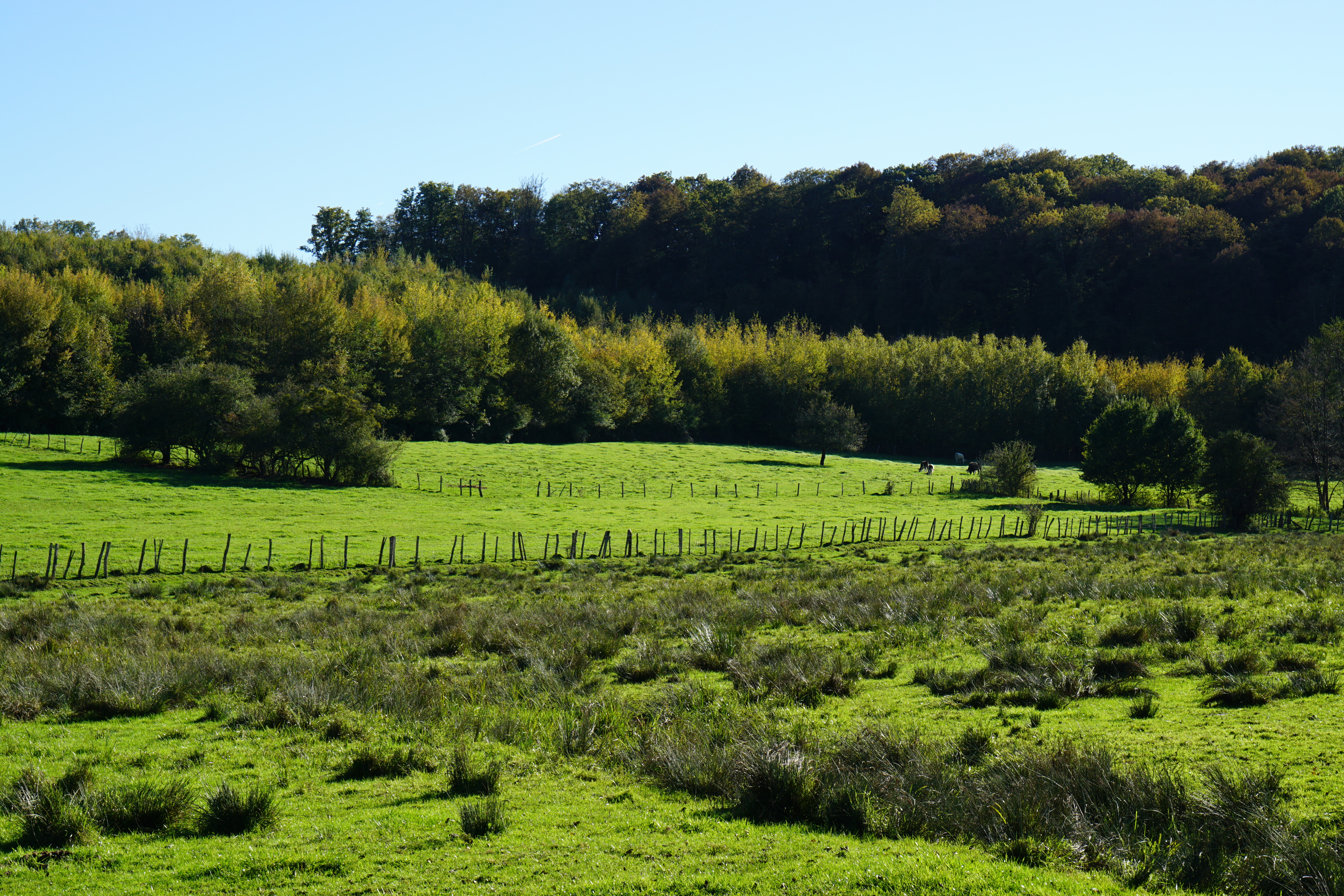
The location of the Misère well.

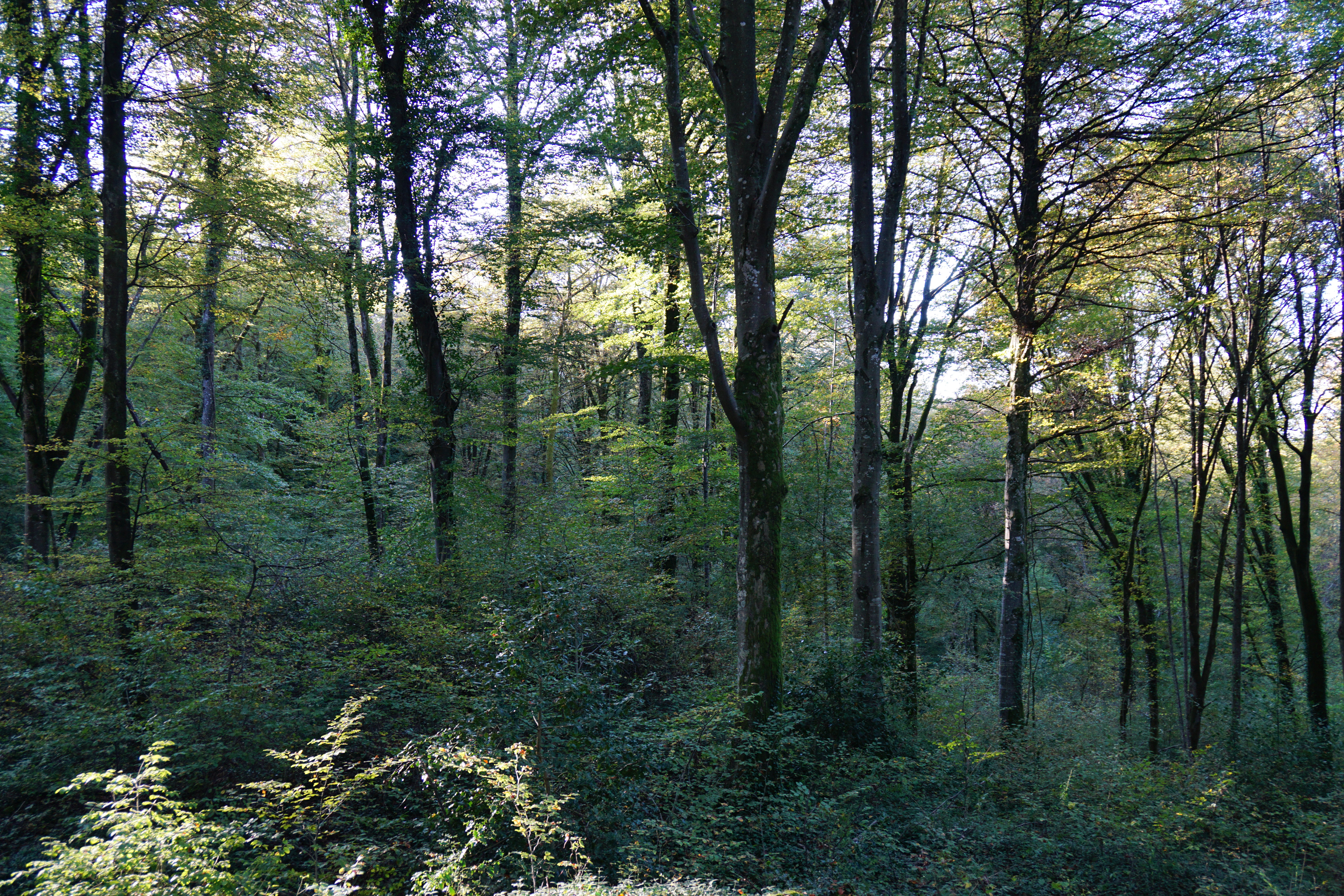
The forest in which the Gannot well is located.

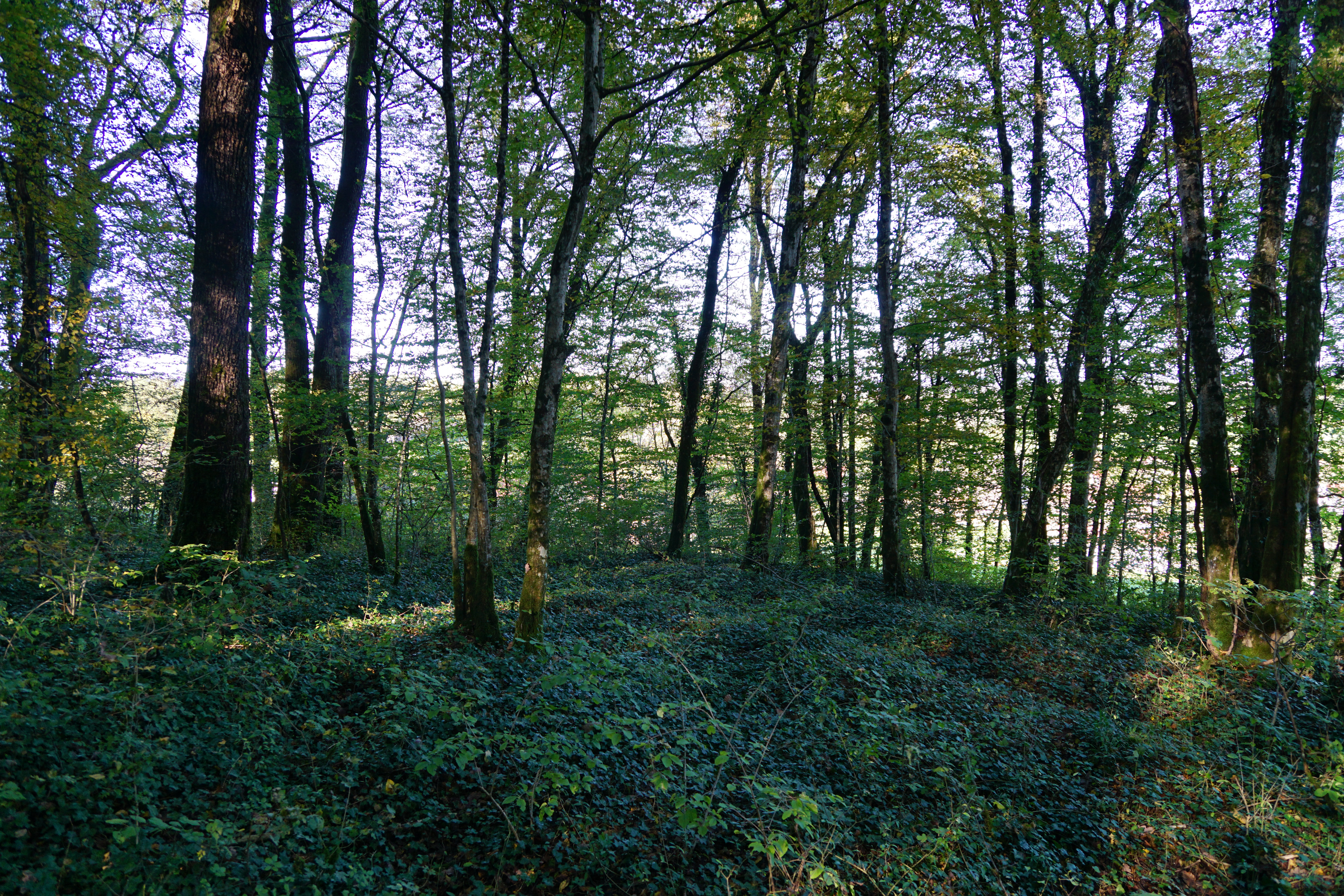
Location of the Sainte-Barbe well.

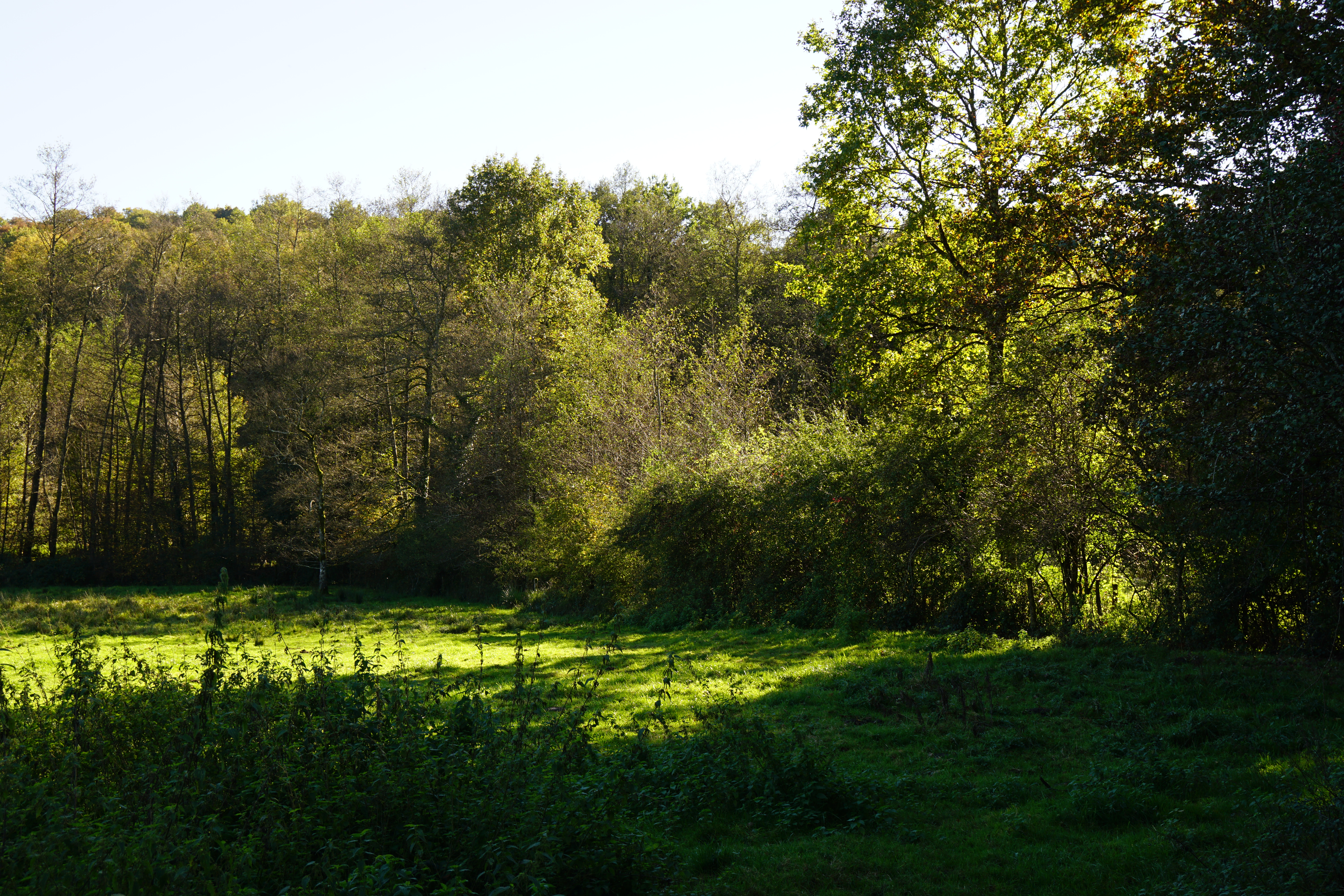
Site of an old well.

=== Adits ===
List of Adits
Excavation Period	Name	Length	Remains	Location
1857–1860	Saint-Jean adit	224 m		
1898	Sainte-Barbe adit	>85 m	Two spoil heaps	47.660372°N 6.419234°E
1942	Inclined adit	260 m	A spoil heap of 3,000 m³ measuring 120 × 50 × 5 meters, a stone wall of 12 × 4.3 meters, and a trench 50 m long and 2 m deep at the entrance.	47.658338°N 6.417234°E

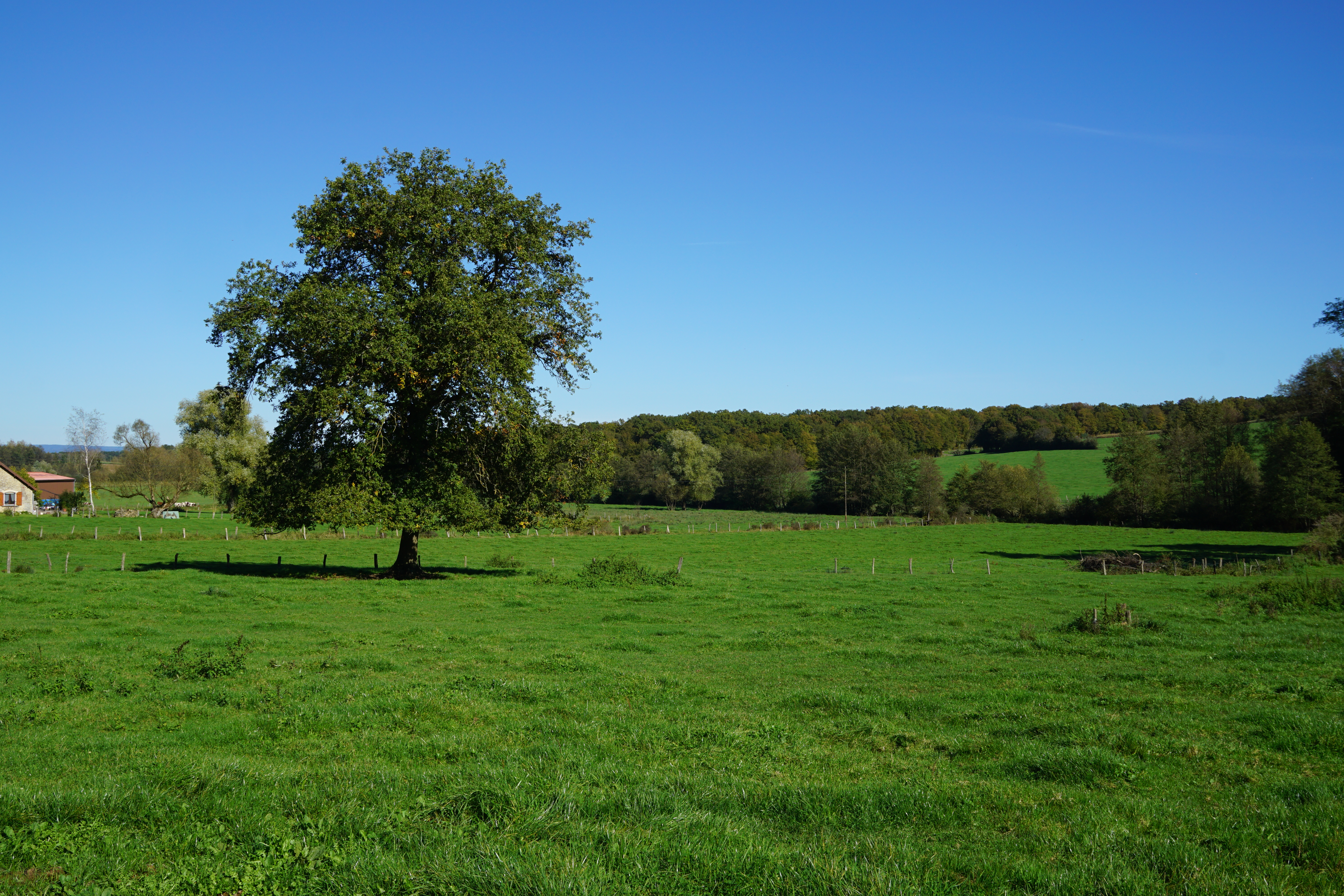
Site of the former Sainte-Barbe adit.

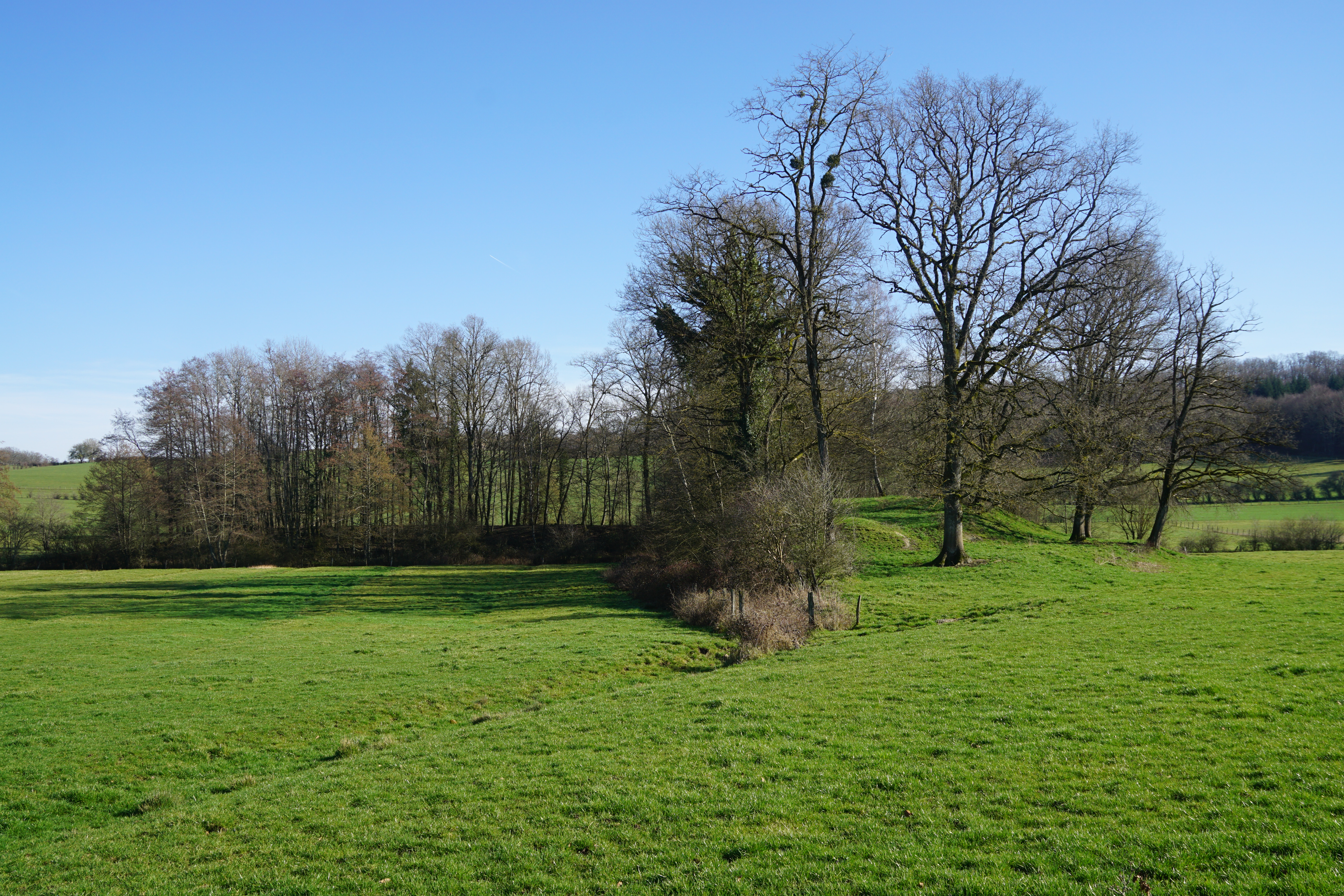
The Sainte-Barbe slag heap.

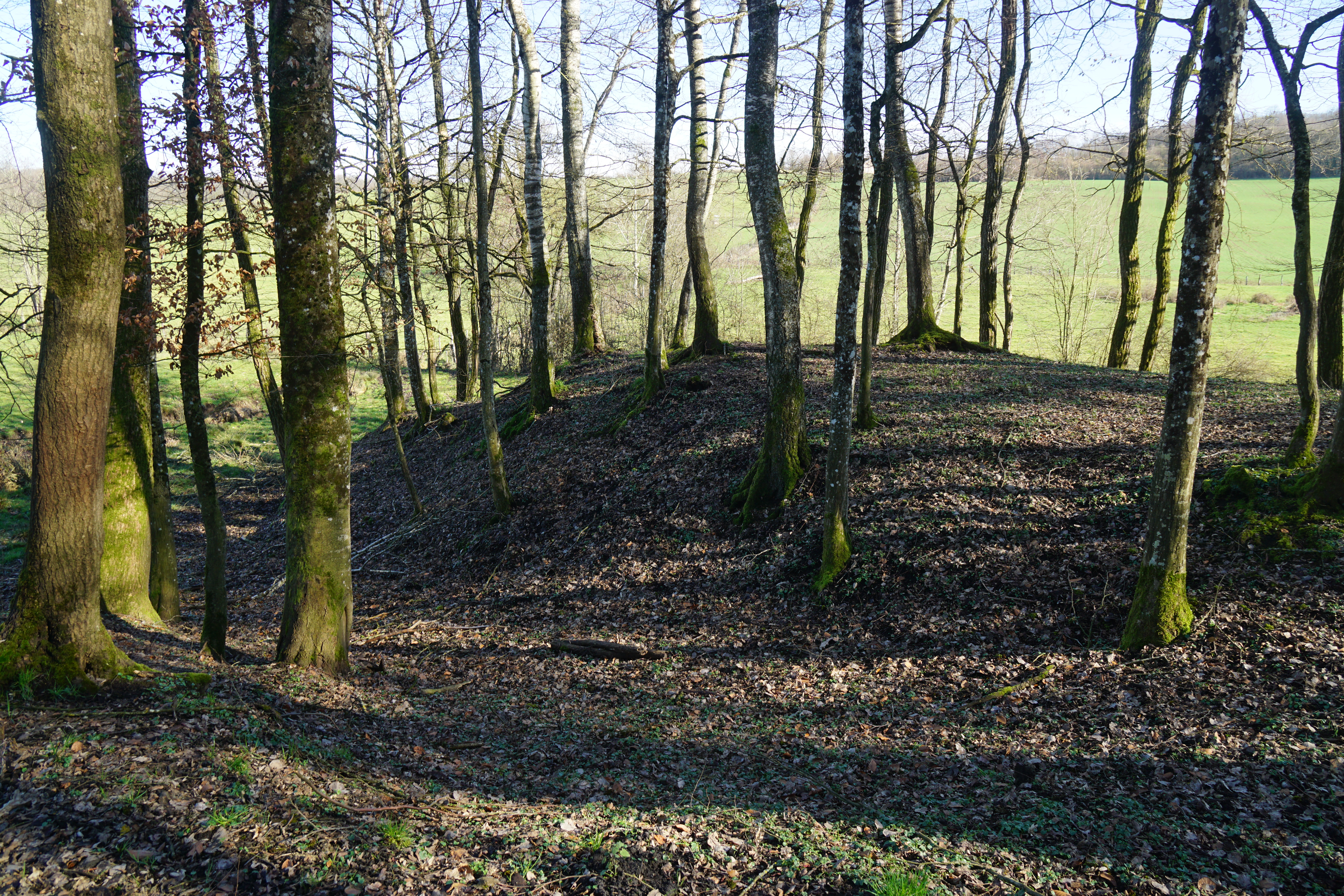
The dumping areas of the slag heap.

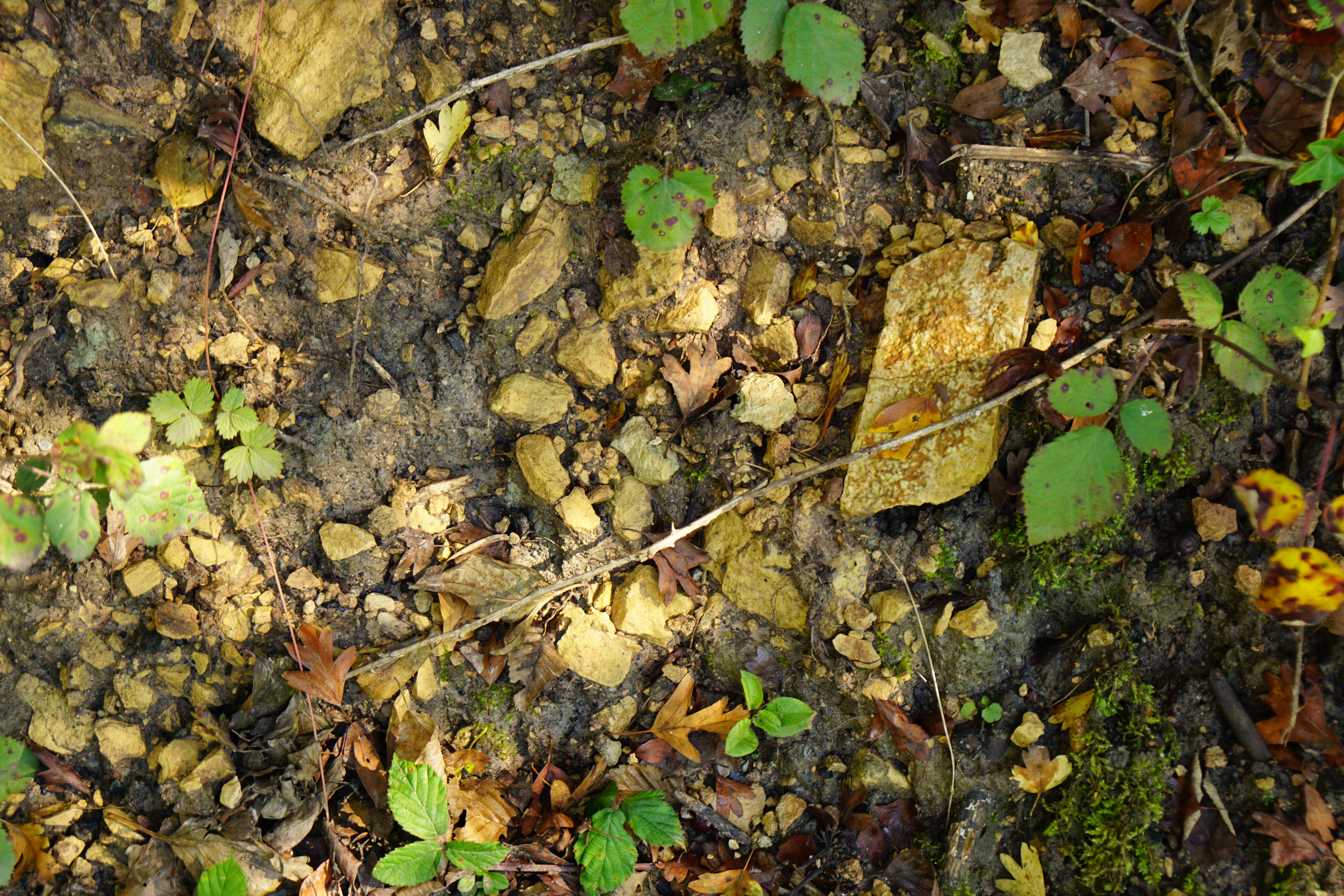
Rocks making up the slag heaps.

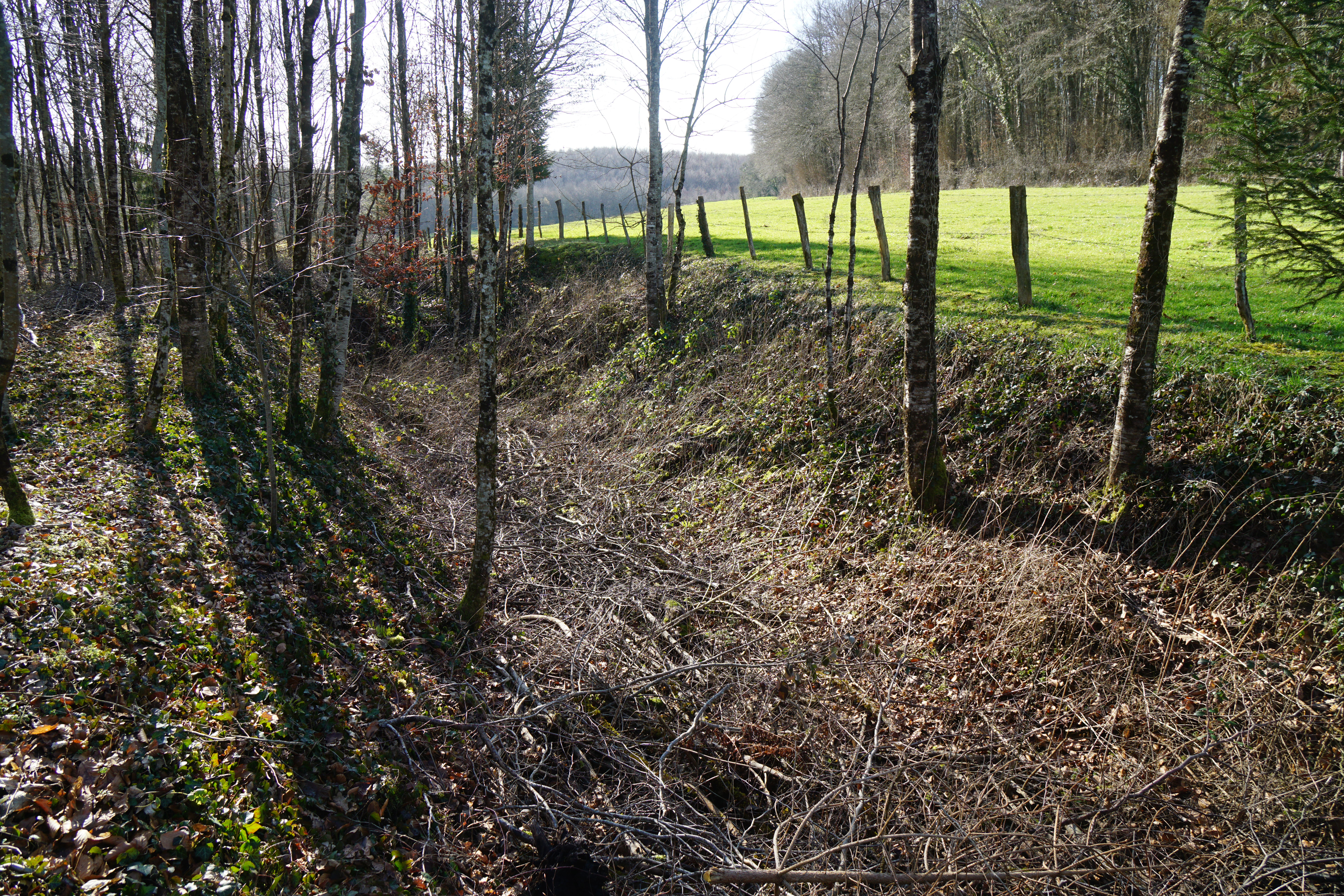
The access trench to the 1942 chute.

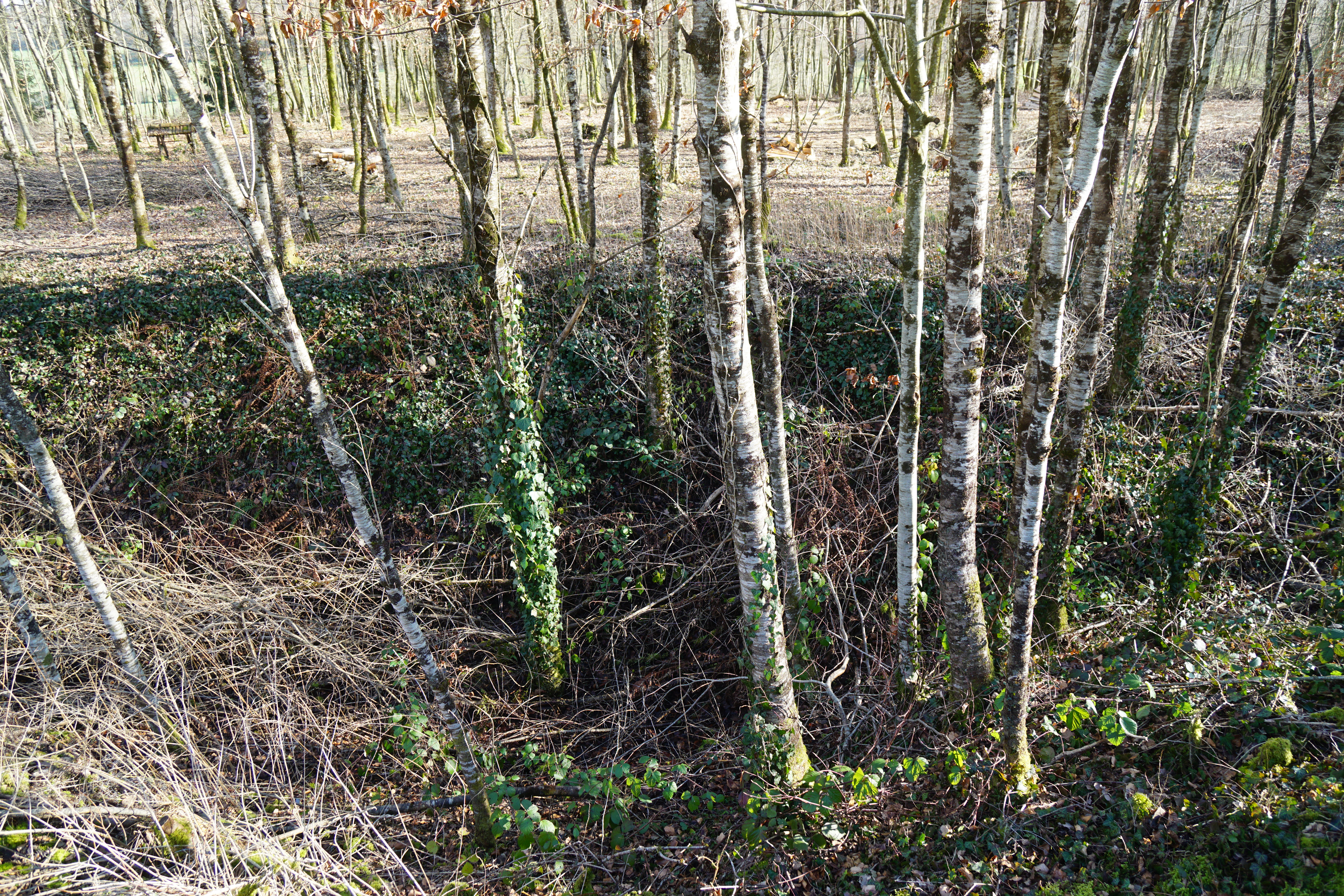
The entrance to the blocked chute.

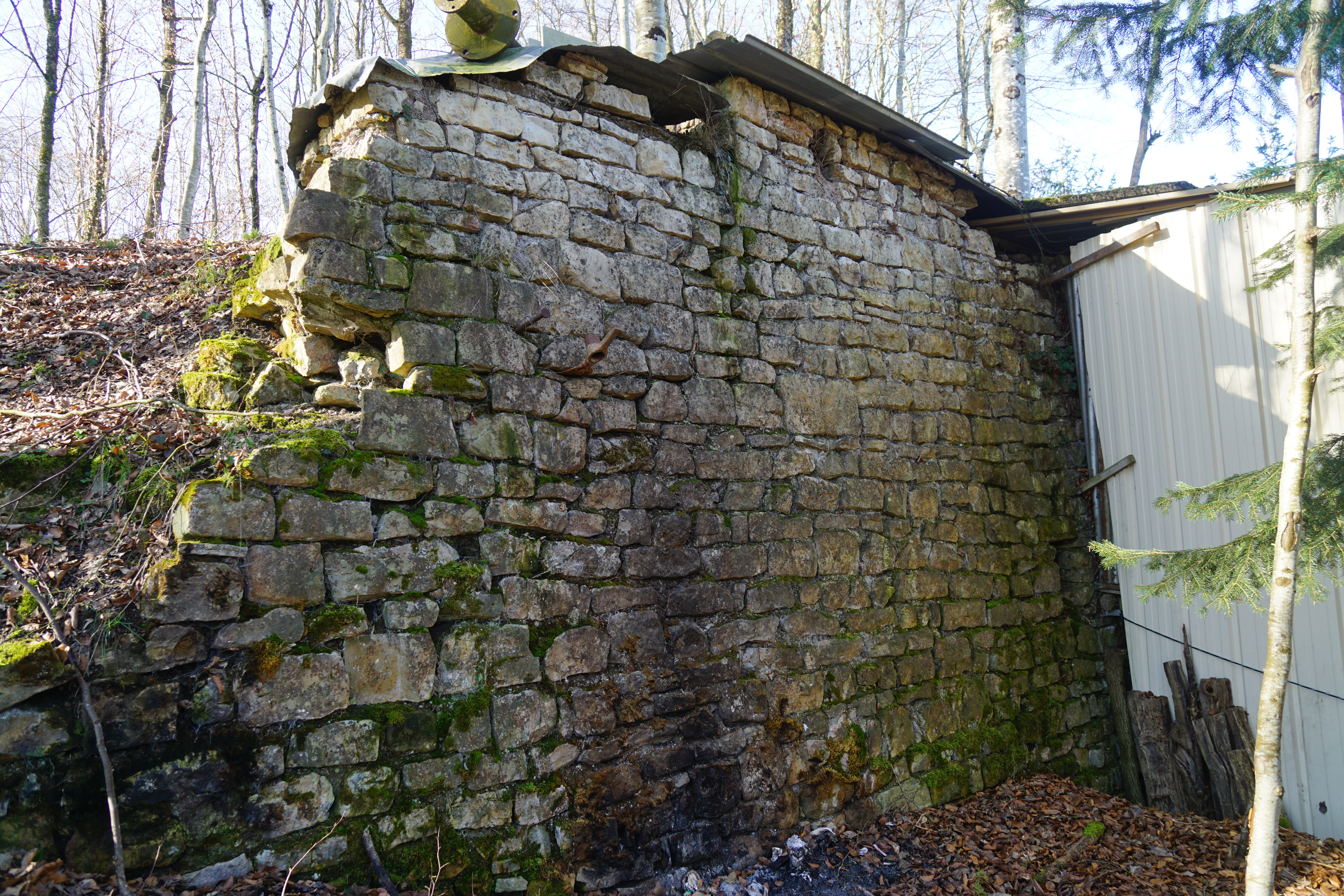
The wall of the slag heap of the chute.

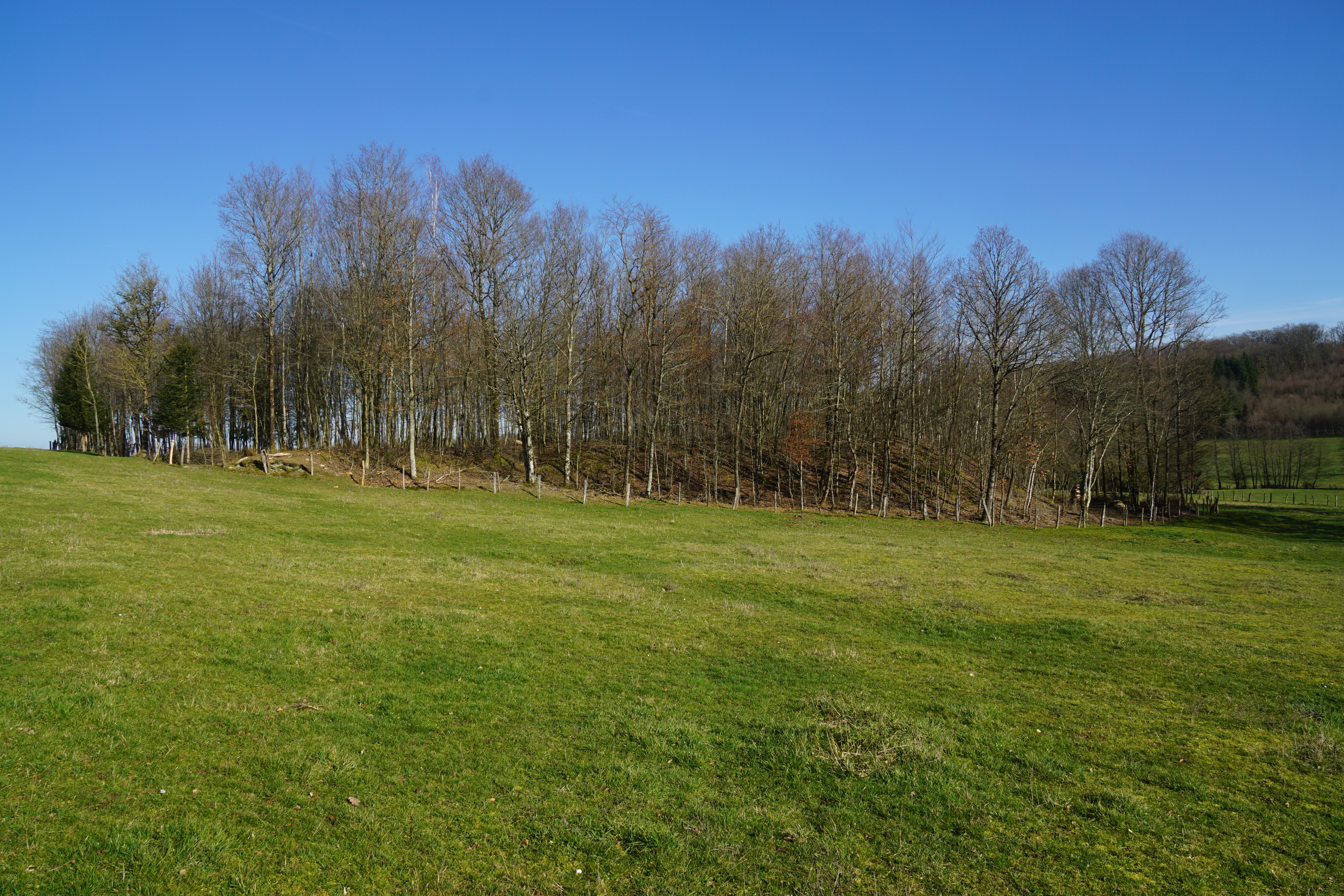
General view of the slag heap.

=== Boreholes ===
List of Boreholes
Date	Number	Depth	Seam Thickness
1857	1	29.1 m	80 cm
1857	2	12.2 m	60 cm
1857	3	69.9 m	100 cm
1858	4	12 m	80 cm
1858	5	27.1 m	70 cm
1860	6	25.5 m	85 cm
1860	7	70.8 m	110 cm
1903	8	45.05 m	5 cm
1903	9	44.85 m	50 cm
1903	10	10.75 m	65 cm
1903	11	12.3 m	30 cm
1903	12	18 m	negative
1942	13	10.15 m	70 cm
1942	14	12 m	70 cm
1942	15	5.4 m	75 cm
1942	16	6 m	traces
1942	17	4 m	75 cm
1942	18	9.4 m	65 cm
1942	19	4.3 m	traces
1942	20	3.5 m	75 cm
1942	21	10 m	65 cm
1942	22	10 m	70 cm
1942	23	6 m	
1942	24	6.4 m	70 cm
1942	25	11.6 m	100 cm
1942	26	6 m	75 cm
1942	27	11 m	80 cm
1942	28	12 m	80 cm
1943	29	11.7 m	? cm
1943	30	22.9 m	traces
1943-1944	31 to 45	?	?

== See also ==
- Vy-lès-Lure
- Mollans
- Haute-Saône Keuperian coalfield

== Bibliography ==
- BRGM (1998). Ancienne concession de houille de Vy-lès-Lure (70) : Etat des lieux [Former Vy-lès-Lure (70) coal concession: Inventory] (PDF) (in French). Archived from the original (PDF) on March 3, 2016.
- Benoit, Paul (1999). Le Charbon de Terre en Europe Occidentale Avant L'usage Industriel Du Coke [Coal in Western Europe Before the Industrial Use of Coke] (in French). Brepols. ISBN 978-2-503-50891-7. Archived from the original on July 14, 2014.
- Dormois, R; Ricours, J (1943). Houille triasique sur le versant N.O. du Jura [Triassic coal on the NW slope of the Jura] (PDF) (in French). BRGM. Archived from the original (PDF) on April 19, 2021.
- Goeury, Carilian; Dalmont, Vor (1901). Annales des mines, partie administrative, ou Recueil de lois, décrets, arrêtés et autres actes concernant les mines et usines [Annals of Mines, administrative part, or Collection of laws, decrees, orders and other acts concerning mines and factories] (in French).
- Société d'agriculture, lettres, sciences et arts de la Haute-Saône (1831). Recueil agronomique, industriel et scientifique [Agronomic, industrial and scientific collection] (in French). Vol. 3–4. pp. 345–351.
