= Maison du Val de Villé =

Museum in France

Coordinates: 48.3565°N 7.3179°E

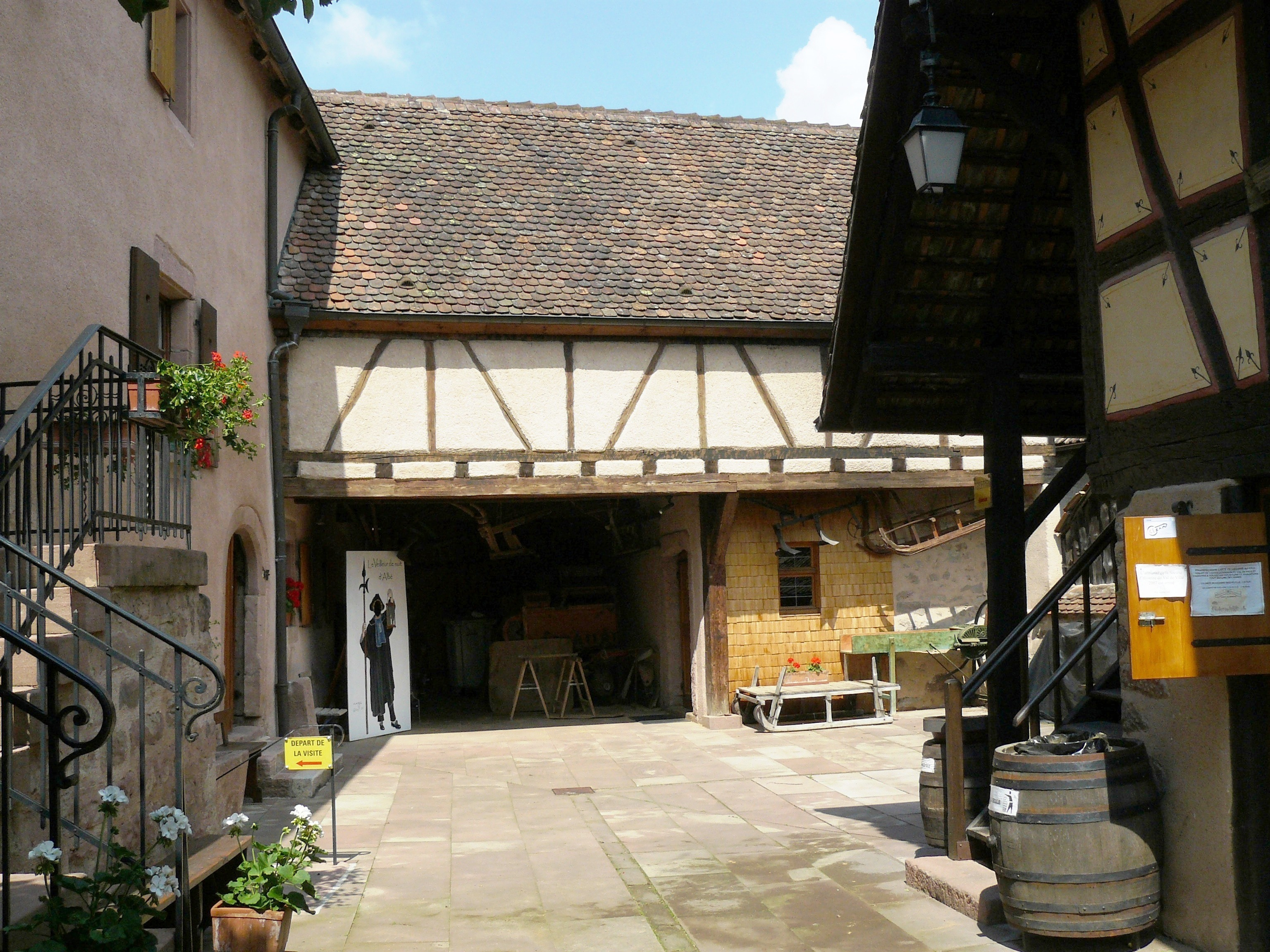
Maison du Val de Villé

Maison du Val de Villé is a museum in Albé in the Bas-Rhin department of France. Since 1982, it has been housed in the former mairie. It presents collections related to distillery, weaving, and all the proto-industrial activities of the Val de Villé region.

== See also ==
- List of museums in France
