= Le Vernoy =

- Commune
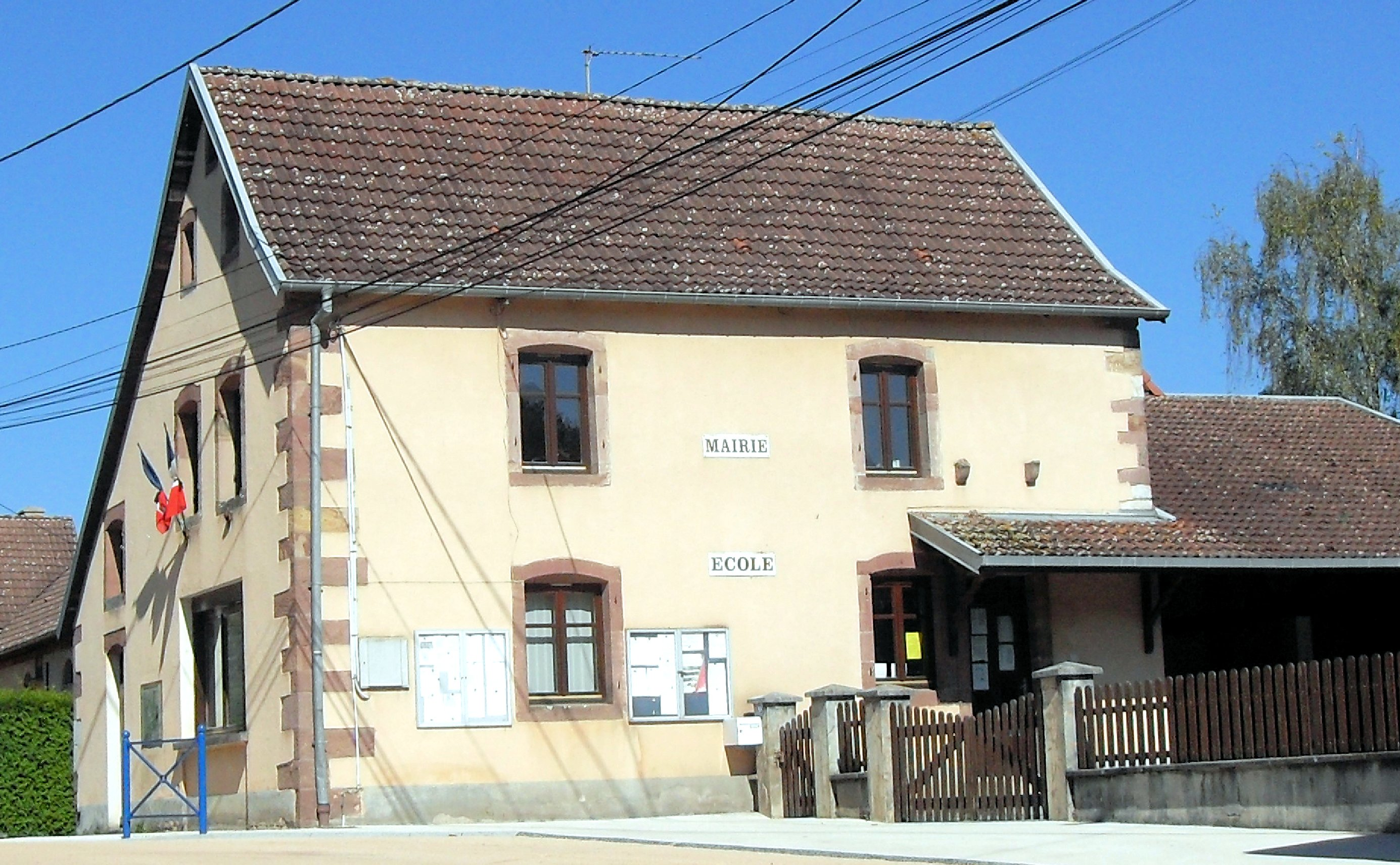
- The town hall and school in Le Vernoy
- Location of Le Vernoy
- Location within France Location within Bourgogne-Franche-Comté
- Coordinates: 47°33′37″N 6°40′35″E
- Country: France
- Region: Bourgogne-Franche-Comté
- Department: Doubs
- Arrondissement: Montbéliard
- Canton: Bavans
- Intercommunality: CC pays d'Héricourt

Government
  - Mayor (2020–2026): Myriam Ioss
- Area^{1}: 3.30 km^{2} (1.27 sq mi)
- Highest elevation: 500 m (1,600 ft)
- Lowest elevation: 373 m (1,224 ft)
- Population (2023): 179
  - Density: 54.2/km^{2} (140/sq mi)
- Time zone: UTC+01:00 (CET)
  - Summer (DST): UTC+02:00 (CEST)
- INSEE/Postal code: 25608 /25750
- ^{1} French Land Register data, which excludes lakes, ponds, glaciers > 1 km^{2} (0.386 sq mi or 247 acres) and river estuaries.

Le Vernoy (French pronunciation: [lə vɛʁnwa]) is a commune in the Doubs department in the Bourgogne-Franche-Comté region in eastern France.

Coal mines are operated in the village.

== Population ==
Historical population
Year	Pop.	±% p.a.
1968	76	—
1975	59	−3.55%
1982	155	+14.80%
1990	158	+0.24%
1999	133	−1.90%
2007	131	−0.19%
2012	174	+5.84%
2017	168	−0.70%
2023	179	+1.06%
Source: INSEE

== See also ==
- Communes of the Doubs department
