= Albé =

Albé Erlebàch
- Commune
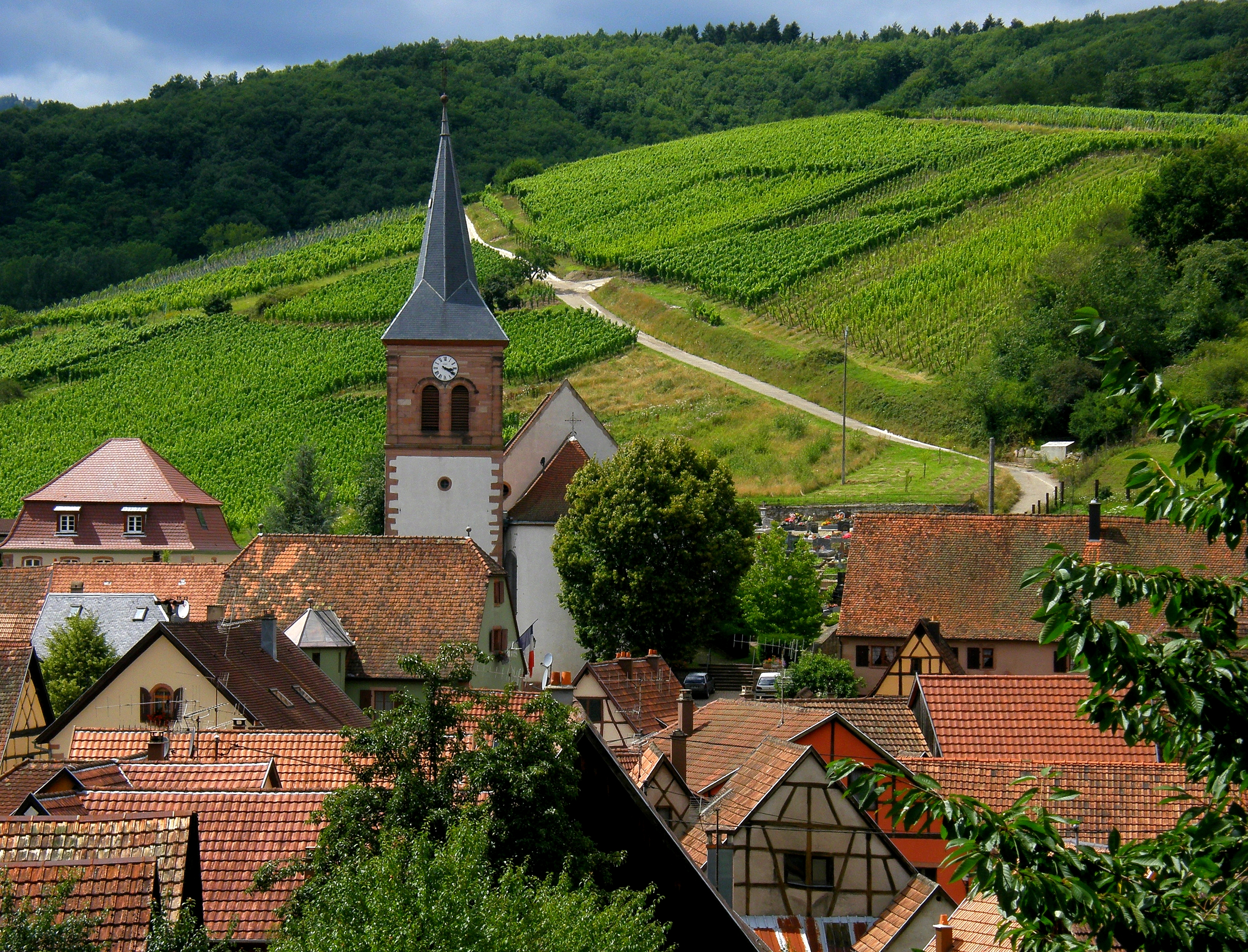
- A general view of Albé and surrounding vineyards

- Coat of arms
- Location of Albé
- Location within France Location within Grand Est
- Coordinates: 48°21′28″N 7°19′09″E
- Country: France
- Region: Grand Est
- Department: Bas-Rhin
- Arrondissement: Sélestat-Erstein
- Canton: Mutzig
- Intercommunality: Vallée de Villé

Government
  - Mayor (2020–2026): Marie-Line Ducordeaux
- Area^{1}: 10.83 km^{2} (4.18 sq mi)
- Highest elevation: 901 m (2,956 ft)
- Lowest elevation: 274 m (899 ft)
- Population (2023): 473
  - Density: 43.7/km^{2} (113/sq mi)
- Time zone: UTC+01:00 (CET)
  - Summer (DST): UTC+02:00 (CEST)
- INSEE/Postal code: 67003 /67220
- ^{1} French Land Register data, which excludes lakes, ponds, glaciers > 1 km^{2} (0.386 sq mi or 247 acres) and river estuaries.

Albé (French pronunciation: [albe]; German: Erlenbach) is a commune in the Bas Rhin département in Alsace in north-eastern France.

It is located 2 km (1.2 mi) northeast of Villé, on the left bank of the river Giessen close to the valley of Erlenbach, from which it derives its name. To the north and west it is bounded by mountains leading to the communes of Hohwald and Breitenbach. To the east is the peak of Ungersberg. Numerous streams flow from this mounting and the buttresses of the Champ du Feu to the north, which merge to form the brook of the Erlenberg. This river formerly flowed down the main street of the village, but has now been covered. The village is at approximately 300 m (980 ft) altitude.

Until 1867 the village was known by its German name Erlenbach (in a number of variations) (In romance languages Erlen shortens to 'Al' and bach becomes ba and thence bé). The name Albé was formally adopted in 1919.

Under Louis XIV it was awarded a coat of arms emblazoned "Azure, three chevrons Argent". The azure perhaps suggests the river and the three chevrons a narrow boxed valley.

== History ==
The village is first mentioned in 1303 as a possession of the Habsburg Empire. A growth in the population, as a result of an expansion in farming, viticulture and forestry led to the demands by the abbot of Honcourt for the construction of a church which was begun by 1342.

From the 13th to the 15th century, the area was repeatedly occupied by various armies loyal to the German Emperor or the Pope; the villages suffered greatly, especially during the winter of 1444–1445. The nearby camp of Armagnacs, stationed in Châtenois, may have plundered Albé and other villages in the region; however the relative inaccessibility of the area, and the passage of Burgundian troops saved the town from destruction.

During the Easter of 1525, the peasantry of Albé took part in a revolt and the Abbeys of Honcourt and Baumgarten were destroyed. The revolt was crushed by troops from Lorraine on 20 May 1525, and Albé was named by the Lord of Ensisheim as among those responsible for the sacking of the abbeys, and liable for reprisal. Fire spread through the village in 1575 resulting in the destruction of 42 houses and the church.

The town suffered again during the Thirty Years War. After attempting to resist Swedish troops, the town was looted and laid waste. After the war, the town grew again and there was an influx of people from many different backgrounds, who brought with them their architectural traditions. A century of peace brought prosperity based again on viticulture, and during the 18th century many grand lintel frame houses were built.

The French revolution brought a mixture of fear and hope, and the town preserves a tree of freedom, a lime planted in 1795 in the village square. The church had been enlarged in 1752, and by 1802 the village had a full-time vicar and obtained the status of parish.

At the end of the 19th century the farmland was becoming exhausted and the spread of phylloxera gravely affected the town and the population shrank.

Coal mines are operating in the village.

== Population ==
Historical population
Year	Pop.	±% p.a.
1968	501	—
1975	439	−1.87%
1982	457	+0.58%
1990	439	−0.50%
1999	457	+0.45%
2007	474	+0.46%
2012	467	−0.30%
2017	446	−0.92%
2023	473	+0.98%
Source: INSEE

== Economy ==
The town is principally known for its wine; it is the only town in the valley to produce its own vin d'Alsace. The vineyards are on sunny slopes. The vineyards now cover about 15 hectares (37 acres), and this area is expected to increase as hillsides are improved for the purpose. Most of the grapes are processed locally. The forest surrounding the town (795 hectares (1,960 acres)) is largely held in common, though some is privately managed for chestnuts and fuel.

There is little industry in Albé, and even cottage industries such as weaving are not significant. However the production of brandy has taken place on a commercial scale.

== Culture ==
The Maison du Val de Villé is a local museum, housed in the former mairie.

== See also ==
- Communes of the Bas-Rhin department
