= Vosges and Jura coal mining basins =

Vosges and Jura coal mining basins locations on French coal basins map.

The Vosges and Jura coal mining basins are an area of France located between two mountain ranges, that has been shaped by four centuries of coal extraction from the 16th century to the 20th century. It includes four coal basins in three geographic locations.

== Basins and concessions ==
The four coal bassins : Jura coal bassin Stephanian-Under-Vosgian coal bassin Keuperian coal bassin Villé valley coal bassin

=== On the east side of the Vosges ===
Villé valley coal basin

- Lalaye concession, exploited (first half of 19th century),
- Erlenbach concession, exploited (first half of 19th century),
- Saint-Hippolyte concession, exploited (1747 to mid-19th century),
- Sainte-Croix-aux-Mines concession, exploited (first half of 19th century).

=== Between the Vosges and the Jura ===
Stephanian-Under-Vosgian coal basin

- Ronchamp, Champagney and Eboulet concessions, exploited by Ronchamp coal mines (1744-1958),
- Mourière concession, exploited (1844-1891),
- Lomont concession, unexploited (1904),
- Saint-Germain concession, unexploited (1914).

Some Stephanian coal basin's concessions

Keuperian coal basin

- Saulnot concession, exploited (16th to 1925),
- Gémonval concession, exploited (1826 to 1944),
- Gouhenans concession, exploited (1828 to 1916),
- Le Vernoy concession, exploited (1839 to 1852),
- Athesans concession, exploited (1839 to 1916),
- Vy-lès-Lure concession, exploited (1842 to 1943),
- Mélecey concession, exploited (1773 to the end of 19th).
- Grozon concession, exploited (1845 to the 1940s),

Some Keuperian coal basin's concessions

=== On the west side of the Jura ===
Jura coal basin

- European Gas Limited concession, unexploited (2007).
Coal mine Arthur de Buyer, Coal mine Sainte Marie, two sonde towers and a geologic view of Gémonval

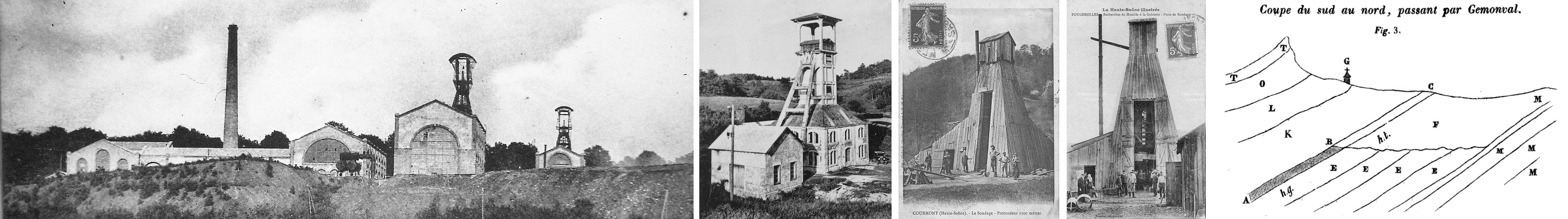
