= Gouhenans =

- Commune
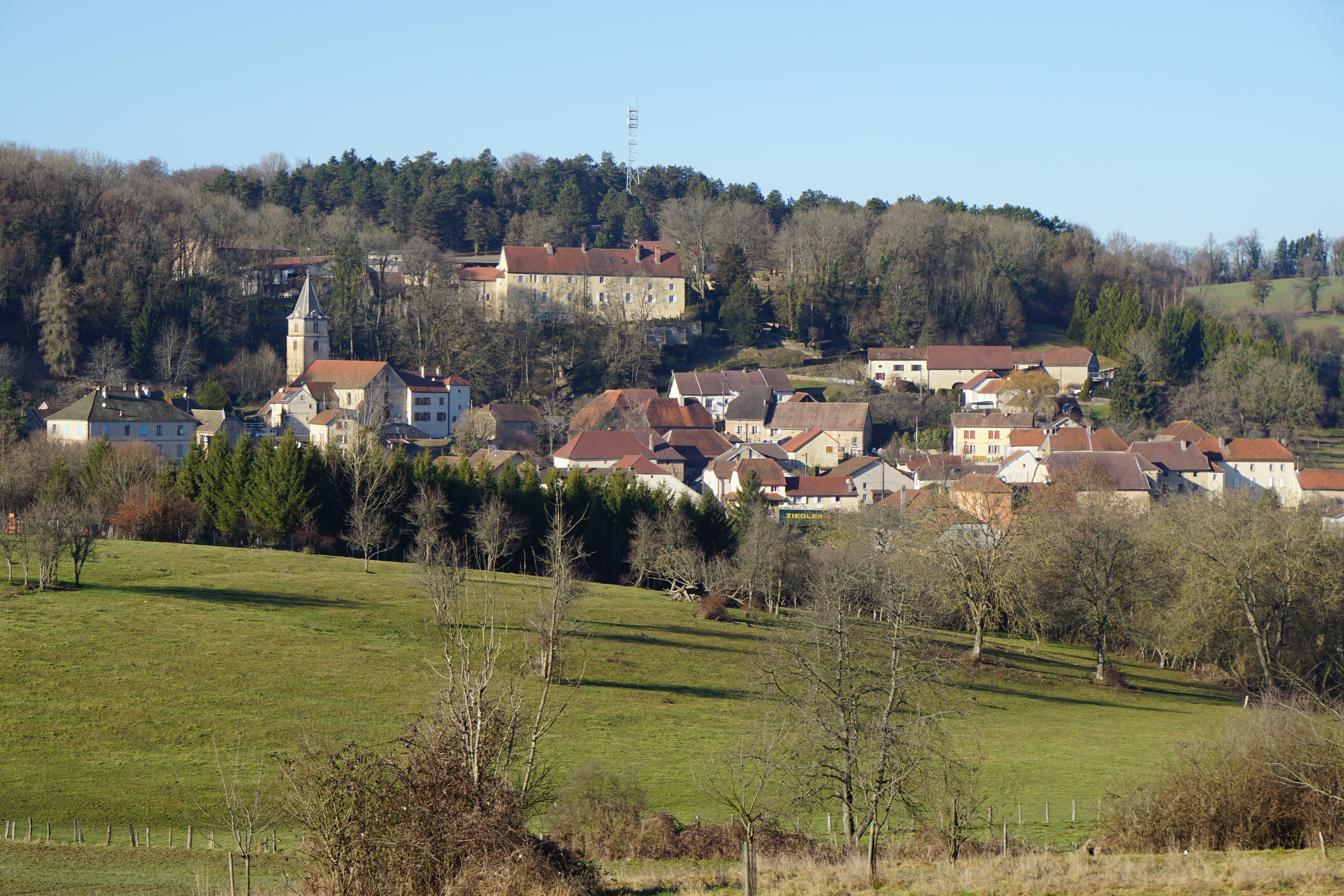
- A general view of Gouhenans

- Coat of arms
- Location of Gouhenans
- Location within France Location within Bourgogne-Franche-Comté
- Coordinates: 47°36′28″N 6°28′12″E
- Country: France
- Region: Bourgogne-Franche-Comté
- Department: Haute-Saône
- Arrondissement: Lure
- Canton: Villersexel
- Area^{1}: 8.45 km^{2} (3.26 sq mi)
- Highest elevation: 381 m (1,250 ft)
- Lowest elevation: 277 m (909 ft)
- Population (2023): 357
  - Density: 42.2/km^{2} (109/sq mi)
- Time zone: UTC+01:00 (CET)
  - Summer (DST): UTC+02:00 (CEST)
- INSEE/Postal code: 70271 /70110
- ^{1} French Land Register data, which excludes lakes, ponds, glaciers > 1 km^{2} (0.386 sq mi or 247 acres) and river estuaries.

Gouhenans is a commune in the Haute-Saône department in the region of Bourgogne-Franche-Comté in eastern France.

Coal mines were operated in the village between 1828 and 1916.

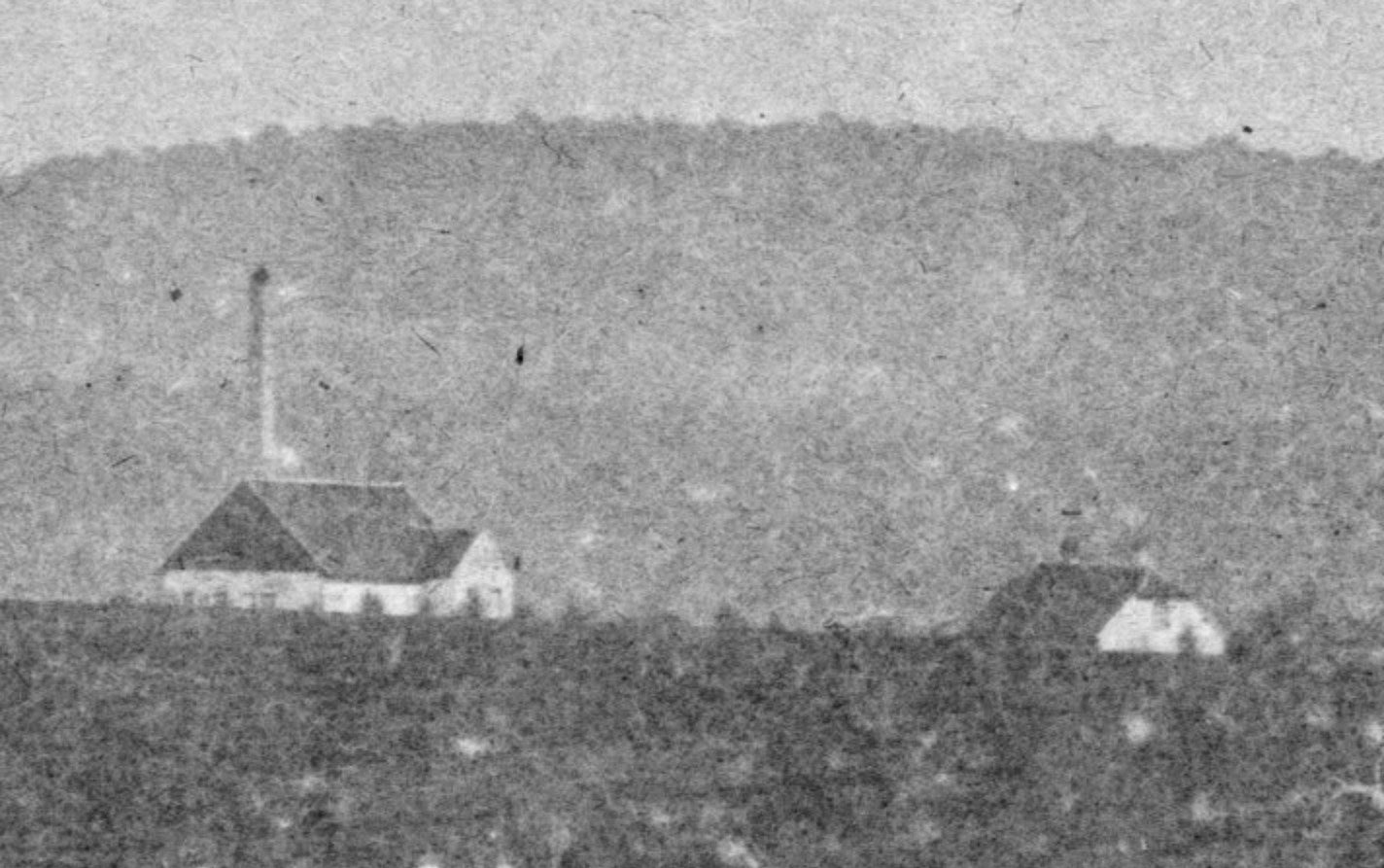
Mine shaft 4.

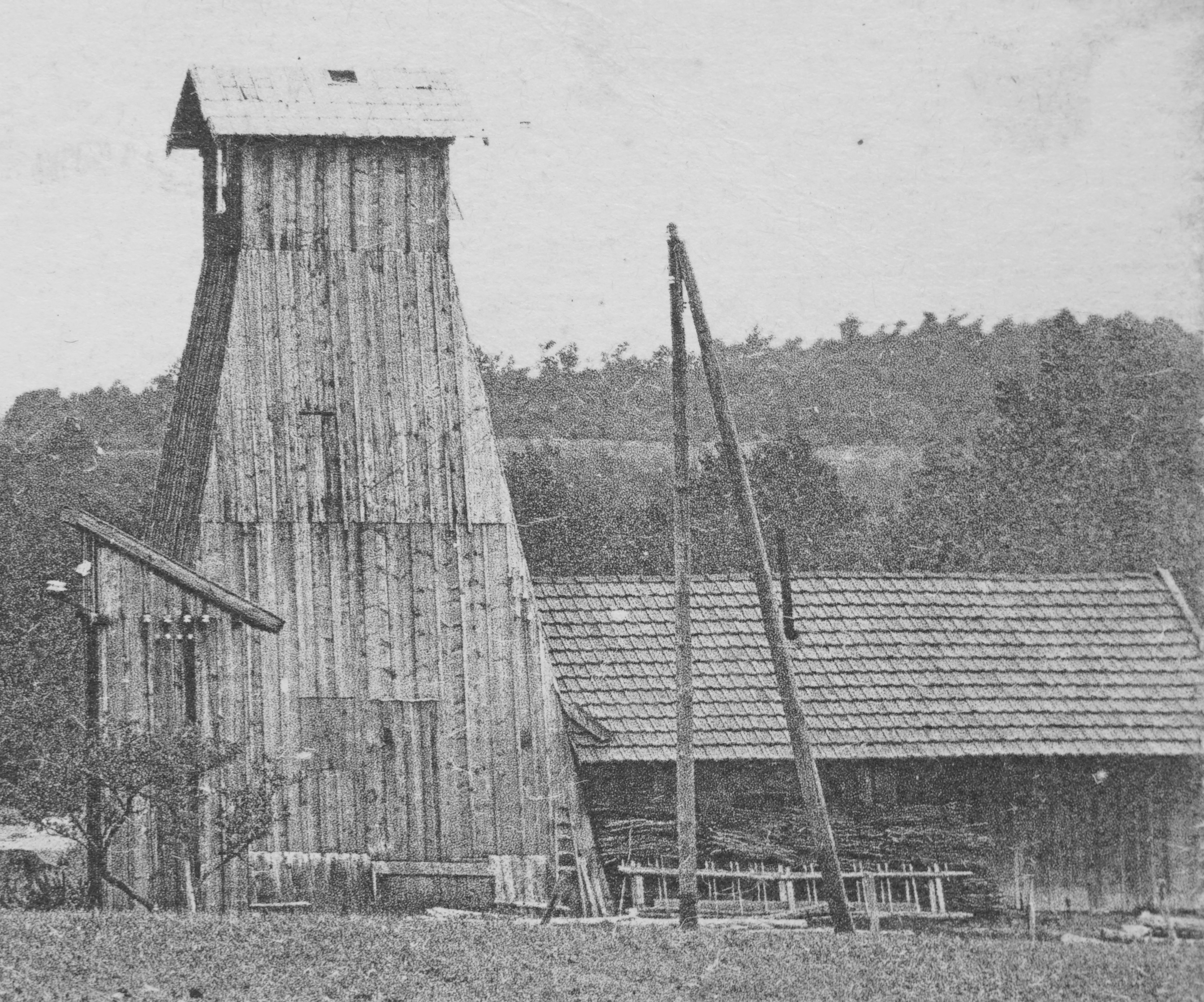
Mine shaft 13.

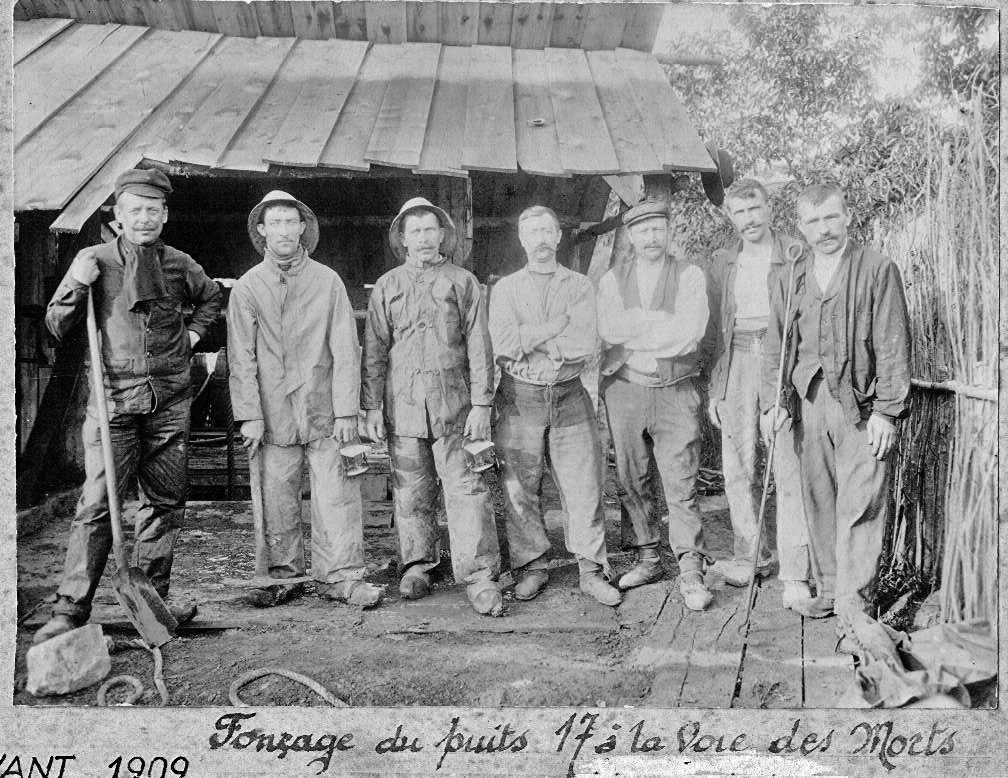
Mine shaft 17.

Salt mines were operating in the village between 1831 and 1945. A chemical factory (1844-1955) and a glass factory (1903-1912) were added to the complex.

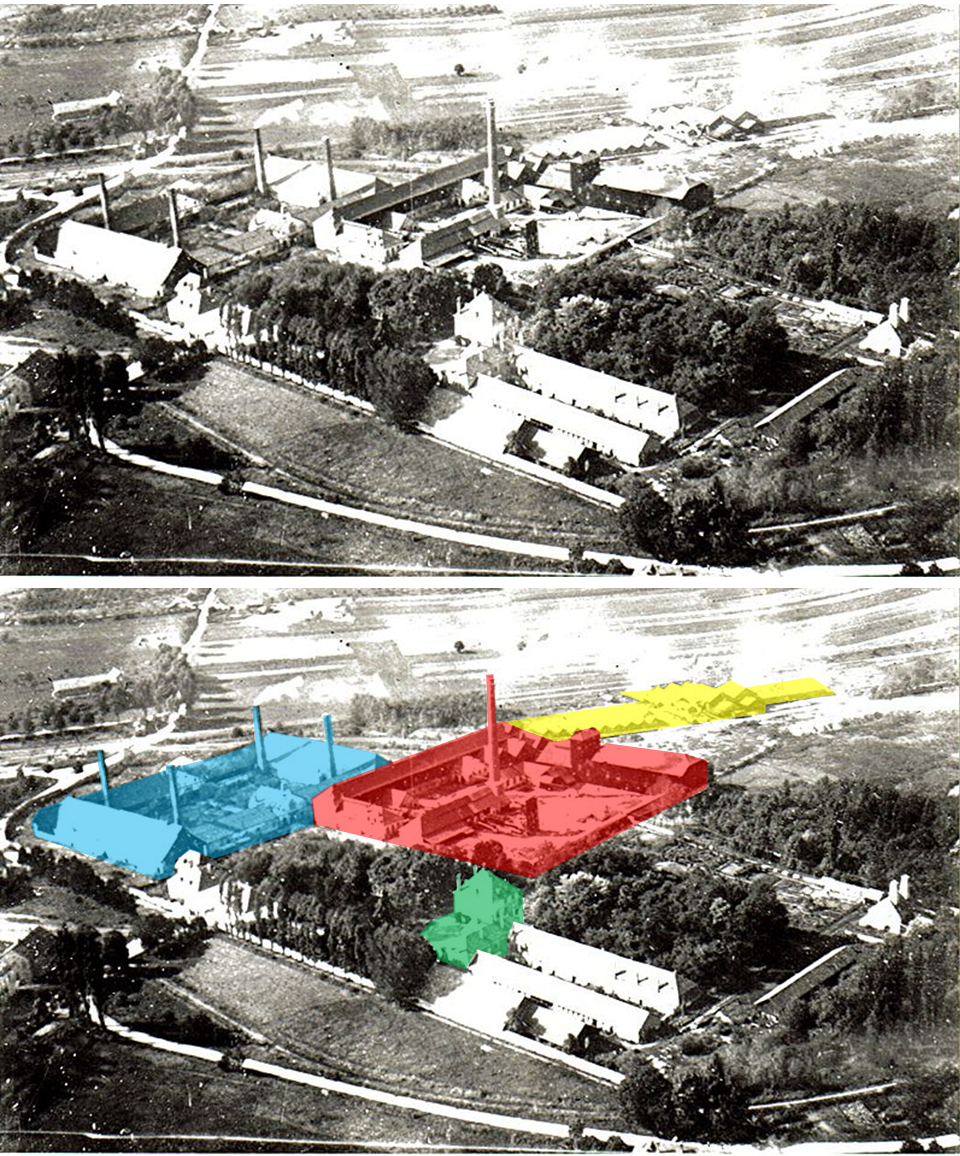
Aerial view of Gouhenans factories.: Salina / Chemical factory; Glass factory / Administrative offices

== See also ==
- Communes of the Haute-Saône department
- Coal mines and saltworks of Gouhenans
