= Vy-lès-Lure =

- Commune
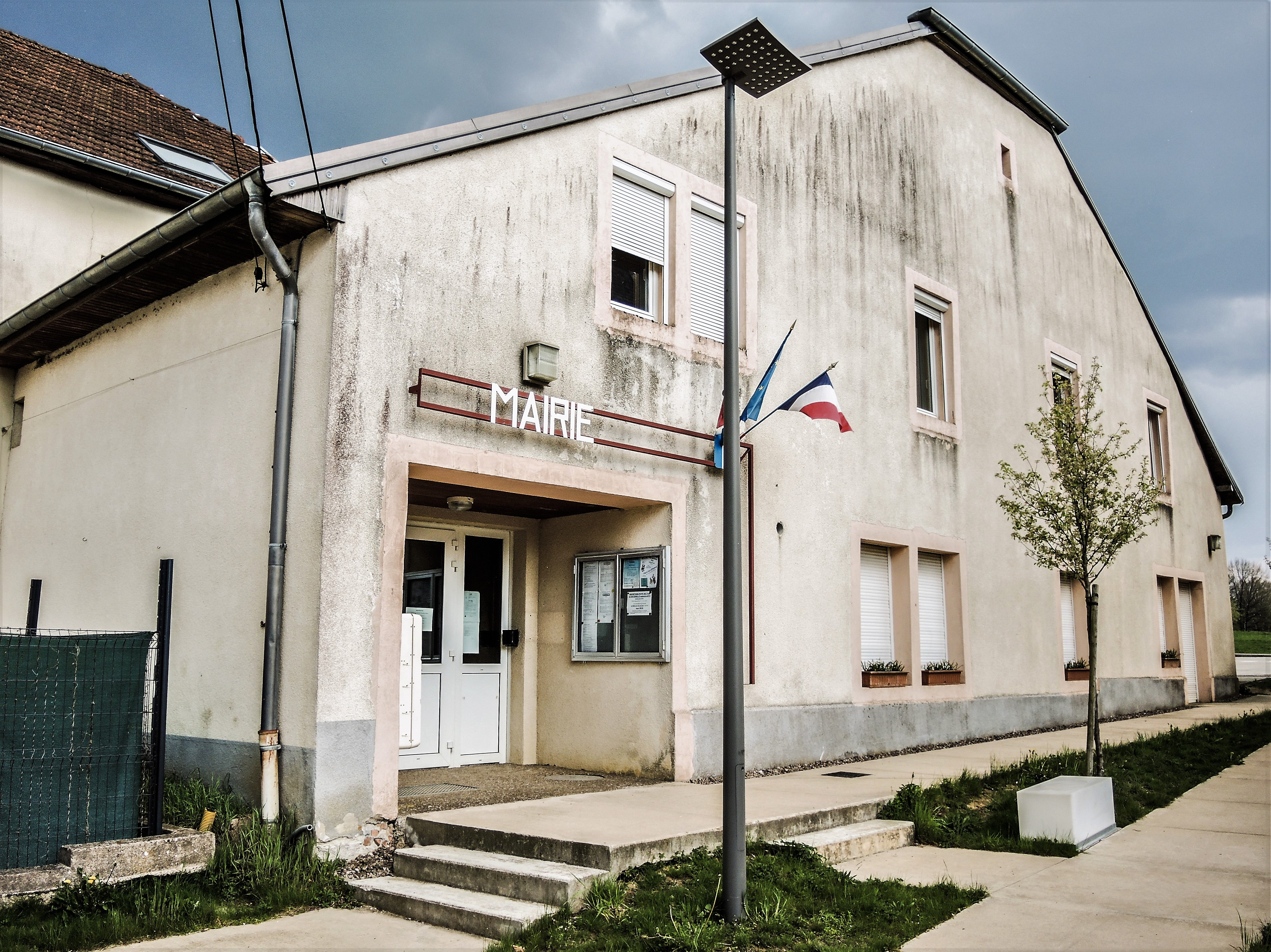
- The town hall in Vy-lès-Lure

- Coat of arms
- Location of Vy-lès-Lure
- Location within France Location within Bourgogne-Franche-Comté
- Coordinates: 47°38′53″N 6°26′52″E
- Country: France
- Region: Bourgogne-Franche-Comté
- Department: Haute-Saône
- Arrondissement: Lure
- Canton: Lure-2
- Intercommunality: Pays de Lure

Government
  - Mayor (2020–2026): Christine Descollonges
- Area^{1}: 16.00 km^{2} (6.18 sq mi)
- Highest elevation: 359 m (1,178 ft)
- Lowest elevation: 275 m (902 ft)
- Population (2023): 704
  - Density: 44.0/km^{2} (114/sq mi)
- Time zone: UTC+01:00 (CET)
  - Summer (DST): UTC+02:00 (CEST)
- INSEE/Postal code: 70581 /70200
- ^{1} French Land Register data, which excludes lakes, ponds, glaciers > 1 km^{2} (0.386 sq mi or 247 acres) and river estuaries.

Vy-lès-Lure (French pronunciation: [vi lɛ lyʁ], literally Vy near Lure) is a commune in the Haute-Saône department in the region of Bourgogne-Franche-Comté in eastern France.

Coal mines were operated in the village until the early-to-mid-to-late 1940s.

== Population ==
Historical population
Year	Pop.	±% p.a.
1968	514	—
1975	437	−2.29%
1982	514	+2.35%
1990	544	+0.71%
1999	555	+0.22%
2007	614	+1.27%
2012	677	+1.97%
2017	676	−0.03%
2023	704	+0.68%
Source: INSEE

== See also ==
- Communes of the Haute-Saône department
