= Mollans =

- Commune
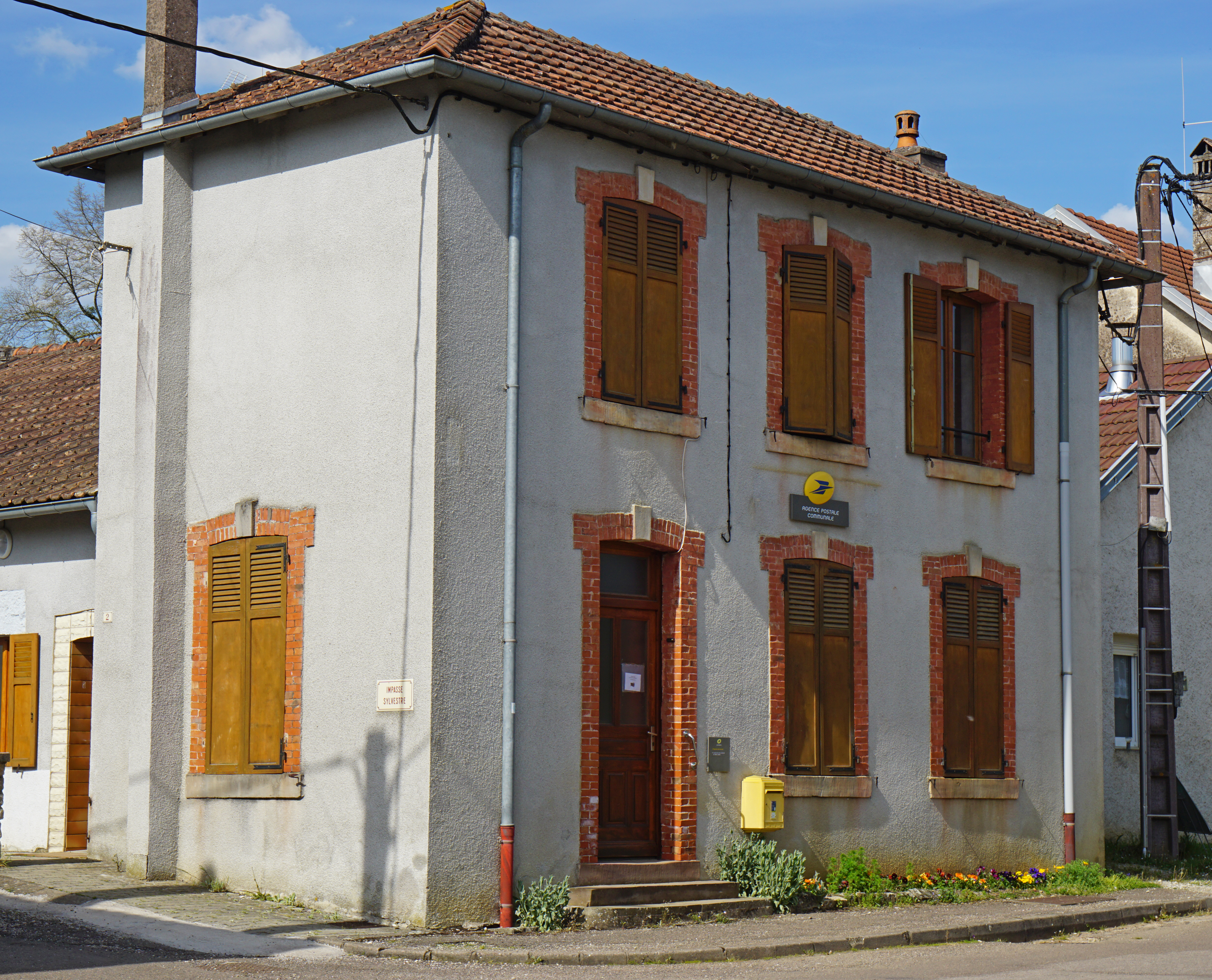
- The post office in Mollans
- Location of Mollans
- Location within France Location within Bourgogne-Franche-Comté
- Coordinates: 47°38′59″N 6°22′15″E
- Country: France
- Region: Bourgogne-Franche-Comté
- Department: Haute-Saône
- Arrondissement: Lure
- Canton: Lure-2
- Area^{1}: 13.45 km^{2} (5.19 sq mi)
- Highest elevation: 358 m (1,175 ft)
- Lowest elevation: 282 m (925 ft)
- Population (2023): 244
  - Density: 18.1/km^{2} (47.0/sq mi)
- Time zone: UTC+01:00 (CET)
  - Summer (DST): UTC+02:00 (CEST)
- INSEE/Postal code: 70351 /70240
- ^{1} French Land Register data, which excludes lakes, ponds, glaciers > 1 km^{2} (0.386 sq mi or 247 acres) and river estuaries.

Mollans (French pronunciation: [mɔlɑ̃]) is a commune in the Haute-Saône department in the region of Bourgogne-Franche-Comté in eastern France.

== See also ==
- Communes of the Haute-Saône department
