= Athesans-Étroitefontaine =

- Commune
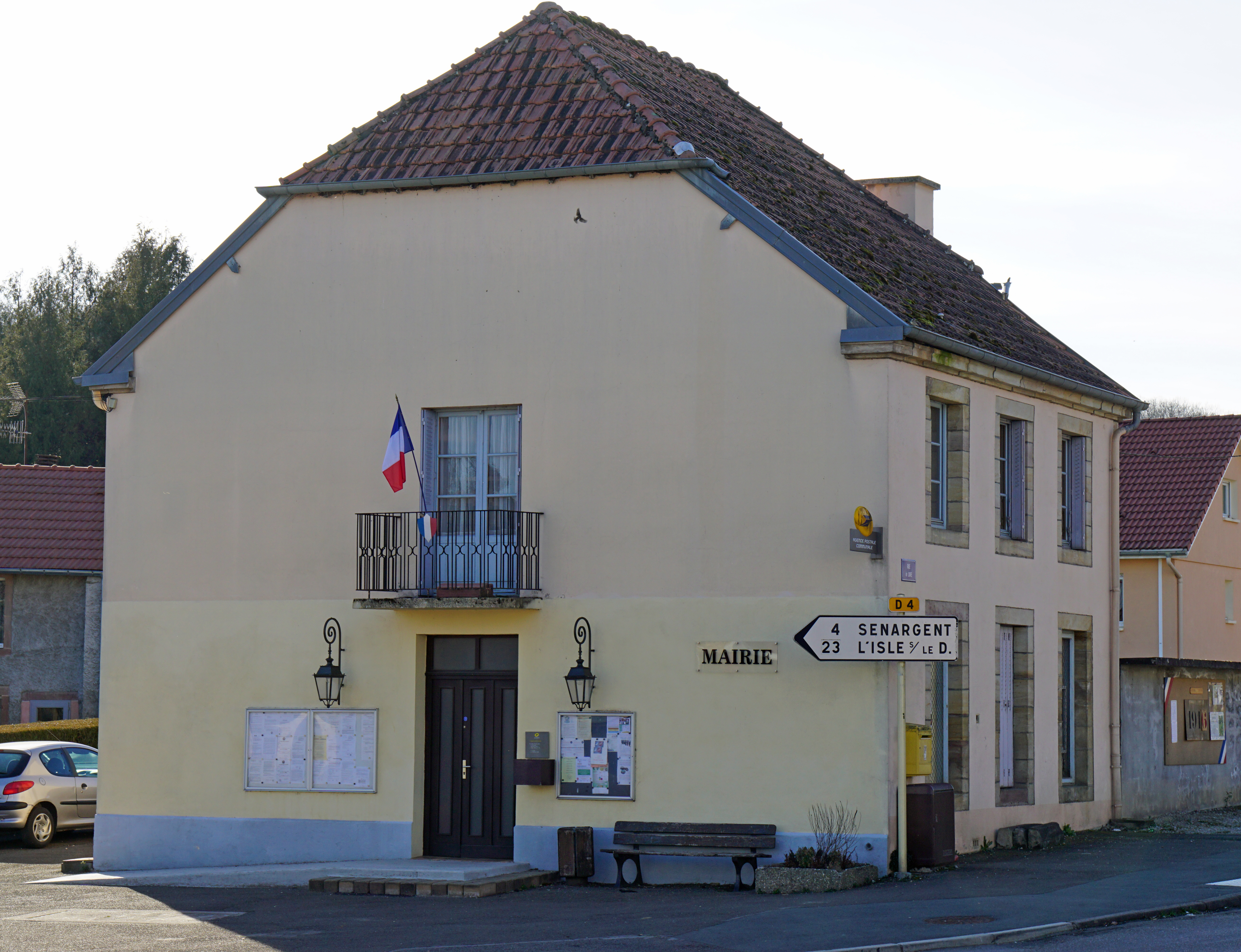
- The town hall in Athesans-Étroitefontaine
- Location of Athesans-Étroitefontaine
- Location within France Location within Bourgogne-Franche-Comté
- Coordinates: 47°35′51″N 6°30′40″E
- Country: France
- Region: Bourgogne-Franche-Comté
- Department: Haute-Saône
- Arrondissement: Lure
- Canton: Villersexel
- Intercommunality: CC Pays de Villersexel

Government
  - Mayor (2020–2026): Alain Bizzotto
- Area^{1}: 12.88 km^{2} (4.97 sq mi)
- Highest elevation: 367 m (1,204 ft)
- Lowest elevation: 269 m (883 ft)
- Population (2023): 631
  - Density: 49.0/km^{2} (127/sq mi)
- Time zone: UTC+01:00 (CET)
  - Summer (DST): UTC+02:00 (CEST)
- INSEE/Postal code: 70031 /70110
- ^{1} French Land Register data, which excludes lakes, ponds, glaciers > 1 km^{2} (0.386 sq mi or 247 acres) and river estuaries.

Athesans-Étroitefontaine is a commune in the Haute-Saône department in the region of Bourgogne-Franche-Comté in eastern France. It was created in 1973 by the merger of two former communes: Athesans and Étroitefontaine.

Coal mines are operated in the village.

== See also ==
- Communes of the Haute-Saône department
- Coal mines and saltworks of Gouhenans
