= Coal mines and saltworks of Saulnot =

French mines

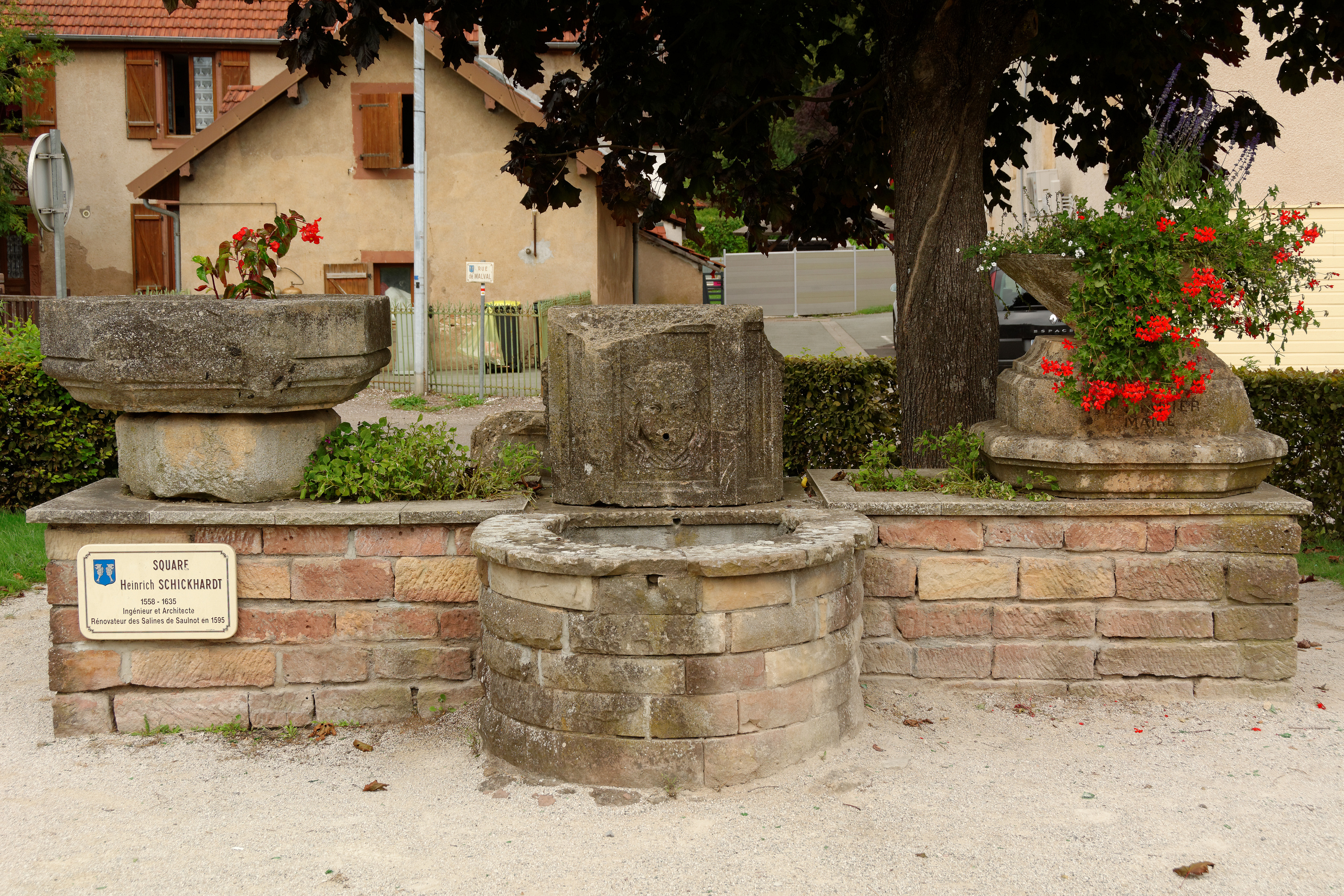
- Square Heinrich Schickhardt.
- Founded: 12th century
- Defunct: 1826 (salt); 1922 (coal)
- Headquarters: Saulnot, France
- Production output: Bituminous coal, halite

The coal mines and saltworks of Saulnot are coal and rock salt mines located in the Keuperian basin in the Haute-Saône department, in the Bourgogne-Franche-Comté region in eastern France. They were operated in the territories of the communes of Saulnot and Corcelles from 1589 to 1921 for coal, and from the 12th century to 1826 for salt (a total of seven centuries). Using locally mined coal to evaporate brine in furnaces designed by Heinrich Schickhardt allowed the company to reduce salt production costs.

At the beginning of the 21st century, there is no trace left of the saltworks, but a square in honor of Heinrich Schickhardt and the salt industry has been laid out in the center of the village of Saulnot. Slag heaps and mine shafts remain in Corcelles.

== Location ==
The coal concession covers an area of 1,485 hectares, spanning the communes of Saulnot, Corcelles, Villers-sur-Saulnot, Échavanne, Crevans-et-la-Chapelle-lès-Granges, and Granges-le-Bourg, in the southeast of the Haute-Saône department, in the Bourgogne-Franche-Comté region.

== Geology ==
The coal and halite deposits are part of the Keuperian coal basin of Haute-Saône. This basin consists of alternating layers of sandstone, variegated marl, and dolomitic gypsum.

== Saltworks ==
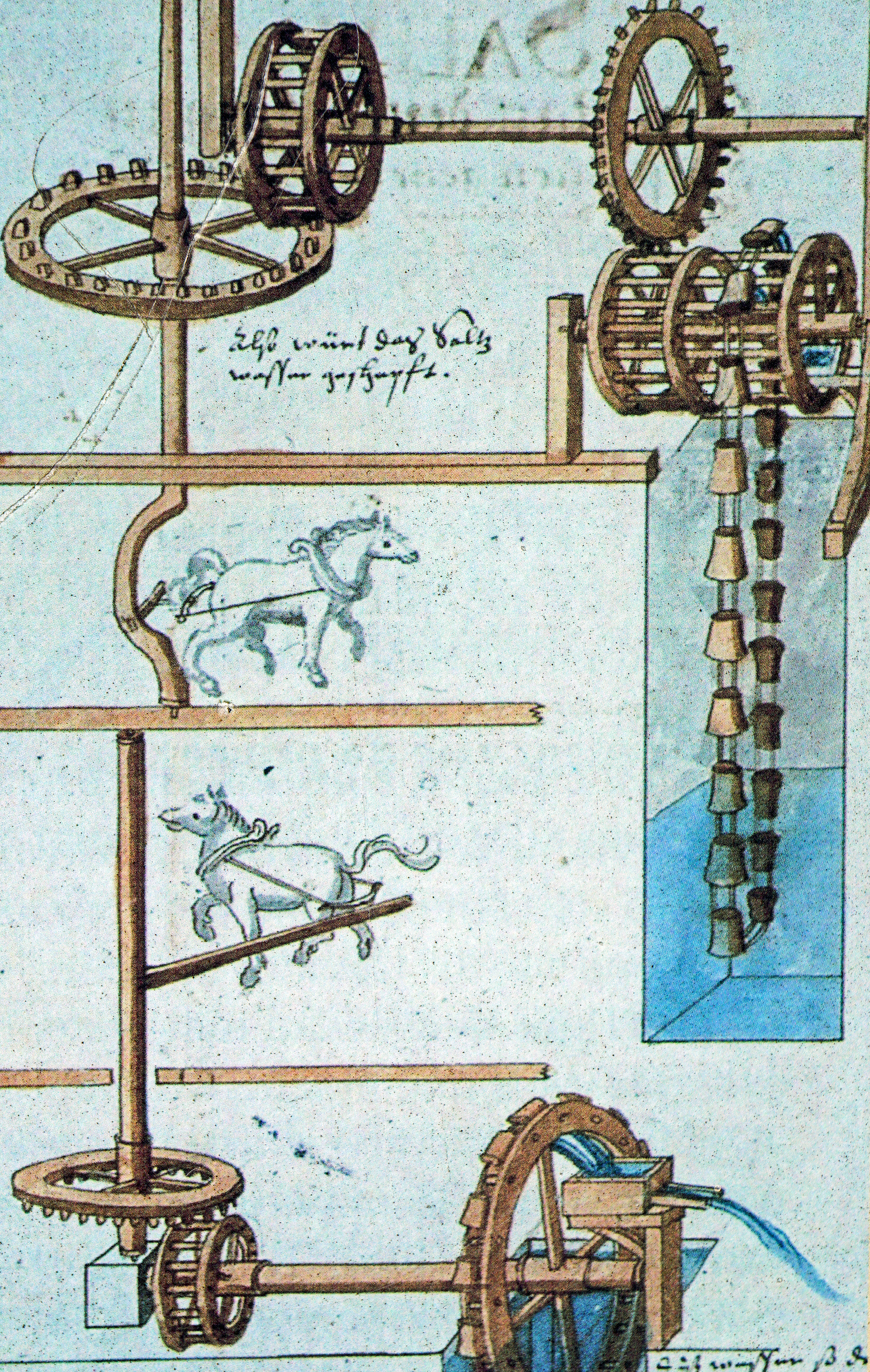
Example of drainage of brine.

Salt production in Saulnot steadily increased along with wood consumption from 1147 onward. At the time, brine was evaporated using wood-fired furnaces to extract halite, which led to the depletion of nearby forests and prompted coal mining from the 16th to the 20th century. This was one of the first sites in Europe to experiment with coal as a fuel for evaporation. The saltworks were supplied by two sources: the large well (located in the village), which fed six boilers, and the small well, which fed three boilers.

In the 13th century, Thierry III granted the saltworks to the Abbey of Lure, which derived significant revenue from salt sales. However, the abbey lost ownership after Thierry’s death around 1282. The profits from salt extraction were then divided between the Counts of Montbéliard and various investors before becoming the exclusive property of the latter in 1367 to compete with the Jura saltworks (owned by the Counts of Burgundy) and to supply neighboring seigneuries in Franche-Comté and Alsace. Graduation and preheating techniques were introduced from the 16th to the 17th century in Germany and the Principality of Montbéliard to save energy, spreading throughout Franche-Comté in the 18th century. In 1424, the large well was abandoned due to fresh water infiltration. In 1550, the saltworks were rebuilt after the 1474 attack by Charles the Bold during the Burgundian Wars. They were partially destroyed again between 1587 and 1588 by Henry I of Guise. In 1592-1593, the new well allowed for increased production, supported by the exploitation of coal enabled by new boilers designed by Heinrich Schickhardt. The buildings were burned by the Comtois in 1639 and rebuilt between 1761 and 1766. In 1749, the site was monitored by seven or eight guard brigades managed by two offices that enforced the gabelle (salt tax) on behalf of the Ferme Générale, which banned salt sales in the seigneury of Granges.

The saltworks declined steadily from 1750 to 1789. On July 23, 1789, during the French Revolution, the buildings were looted and burned along with the archives by peasants from Granges. The concession was taken over by the Compagnie des Salines de l'Est, which permanently ceased operations in 1826. The buildings were purchased by the commune in 1846, twenty years after the brine wells were closed, despite protests from the local population. Before the closure, brine was extracted from two wells, each 15 meters deep, with 16.6 liters of this water yielding 6.6 kg of salt. In 1862, the town hall was built on the former saltworks site. At the beginning of the 21st century, no traces remain of the saltworks, but a square in honor of Heinrich Schickhardt and the salt industry has been established in the center of Saulnot.

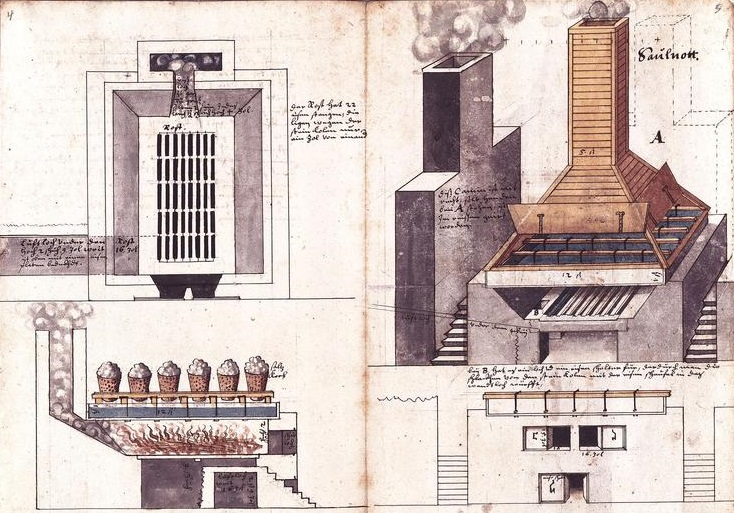
A coal oven of the saltworks (illustration by Heinrich Schickhardt).

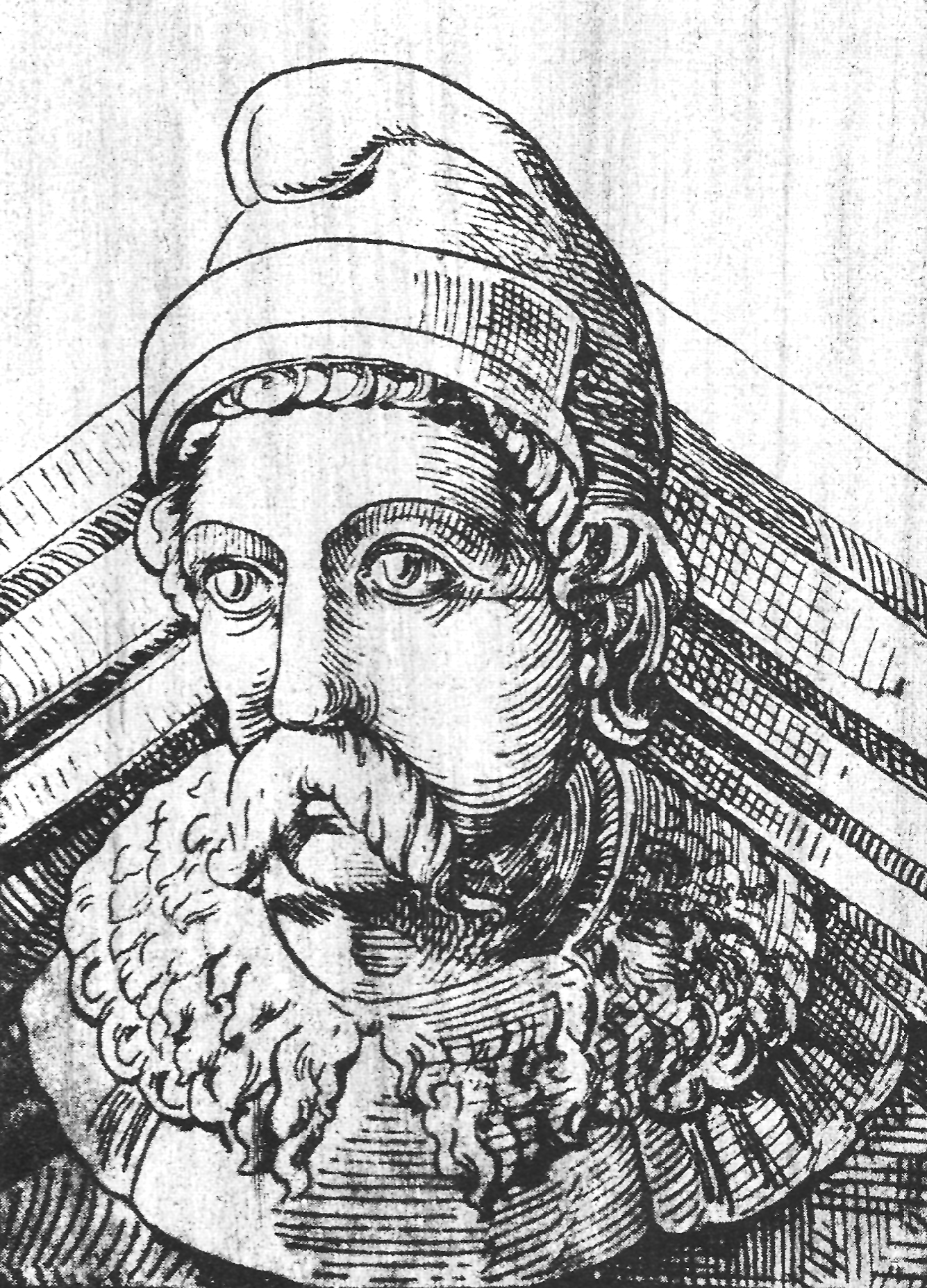
Heinrich Schickhardt.

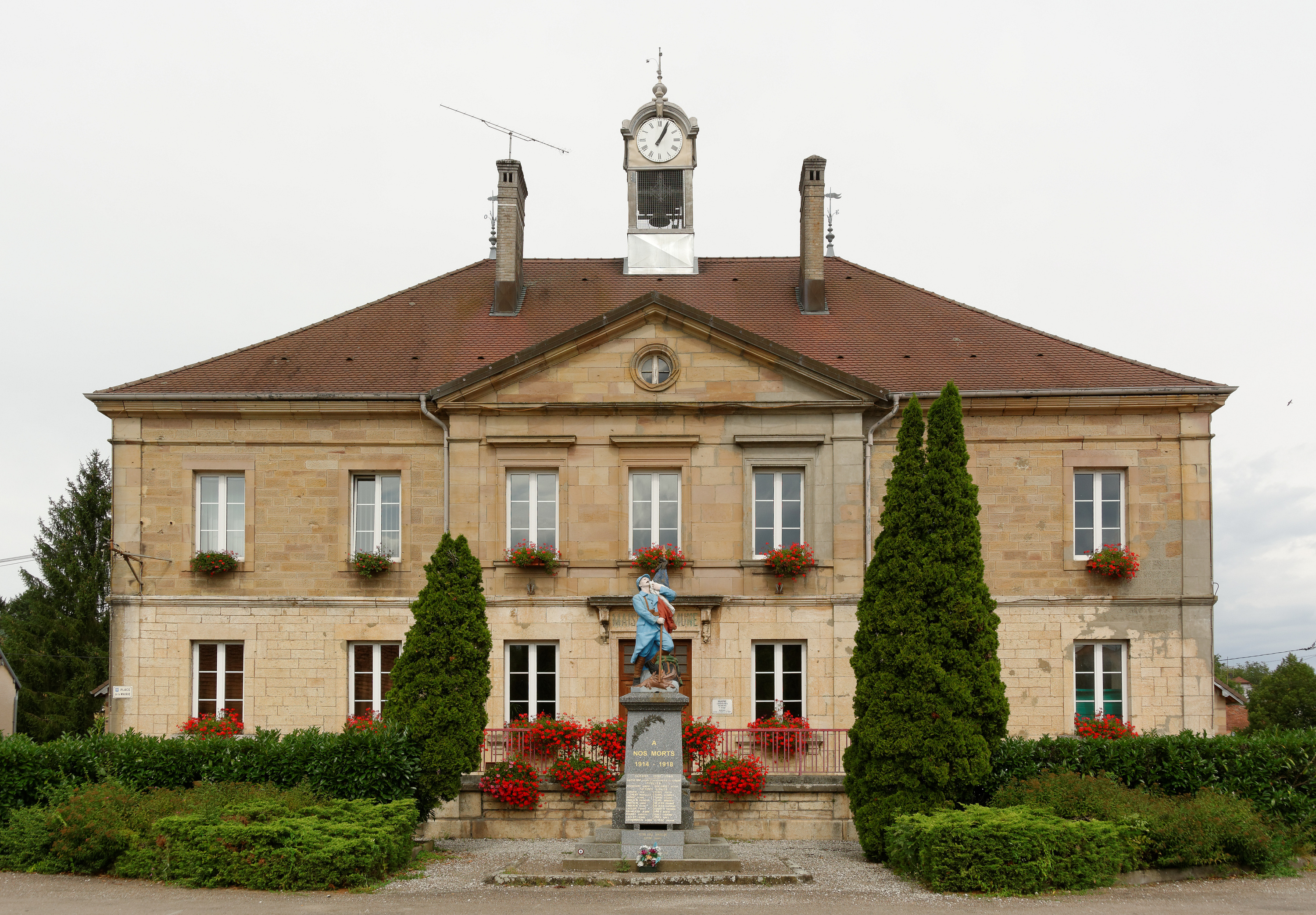
The town hall of Saulnot is built on the site of the saltworks.

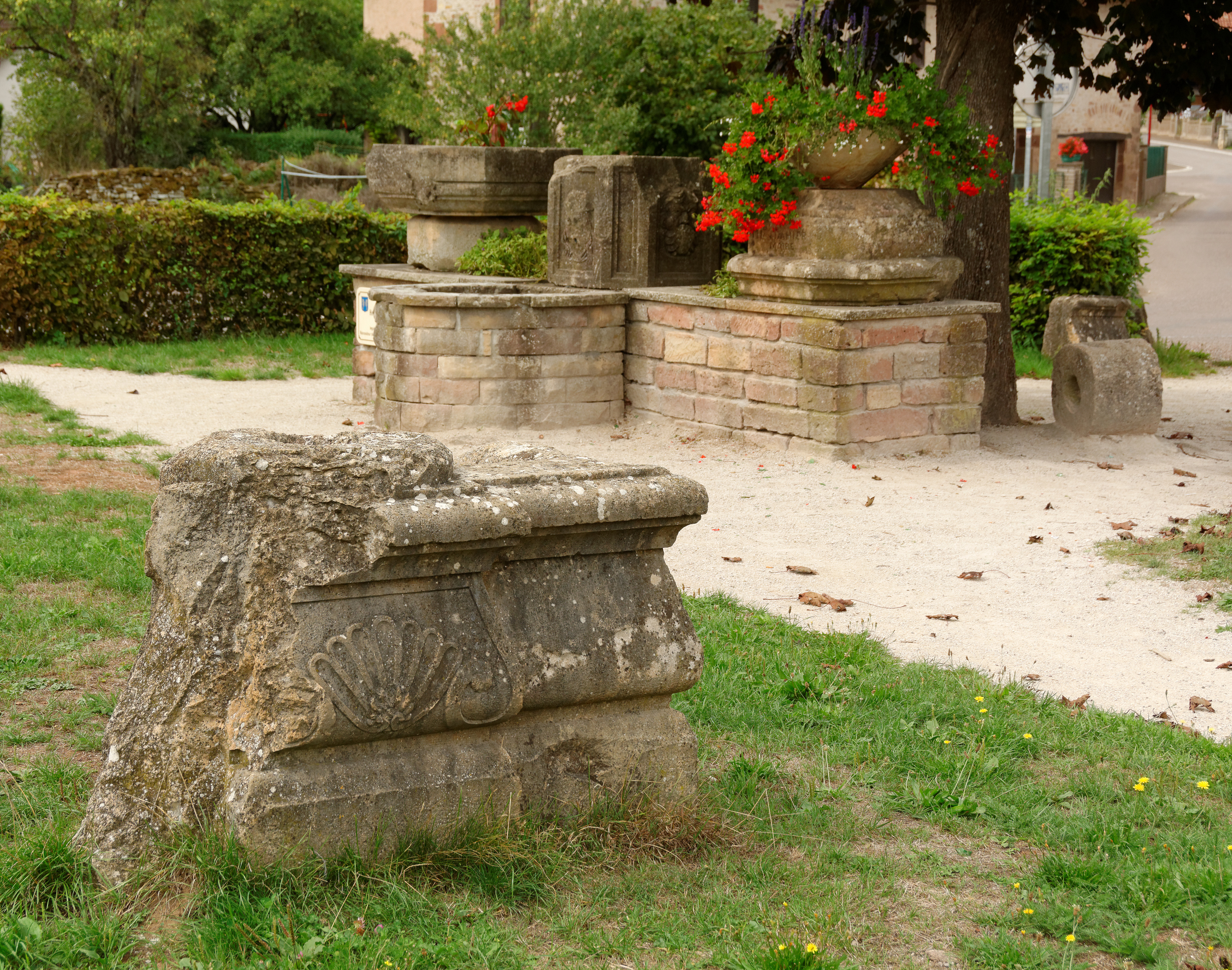
Square Heinrich-Schickhardt.

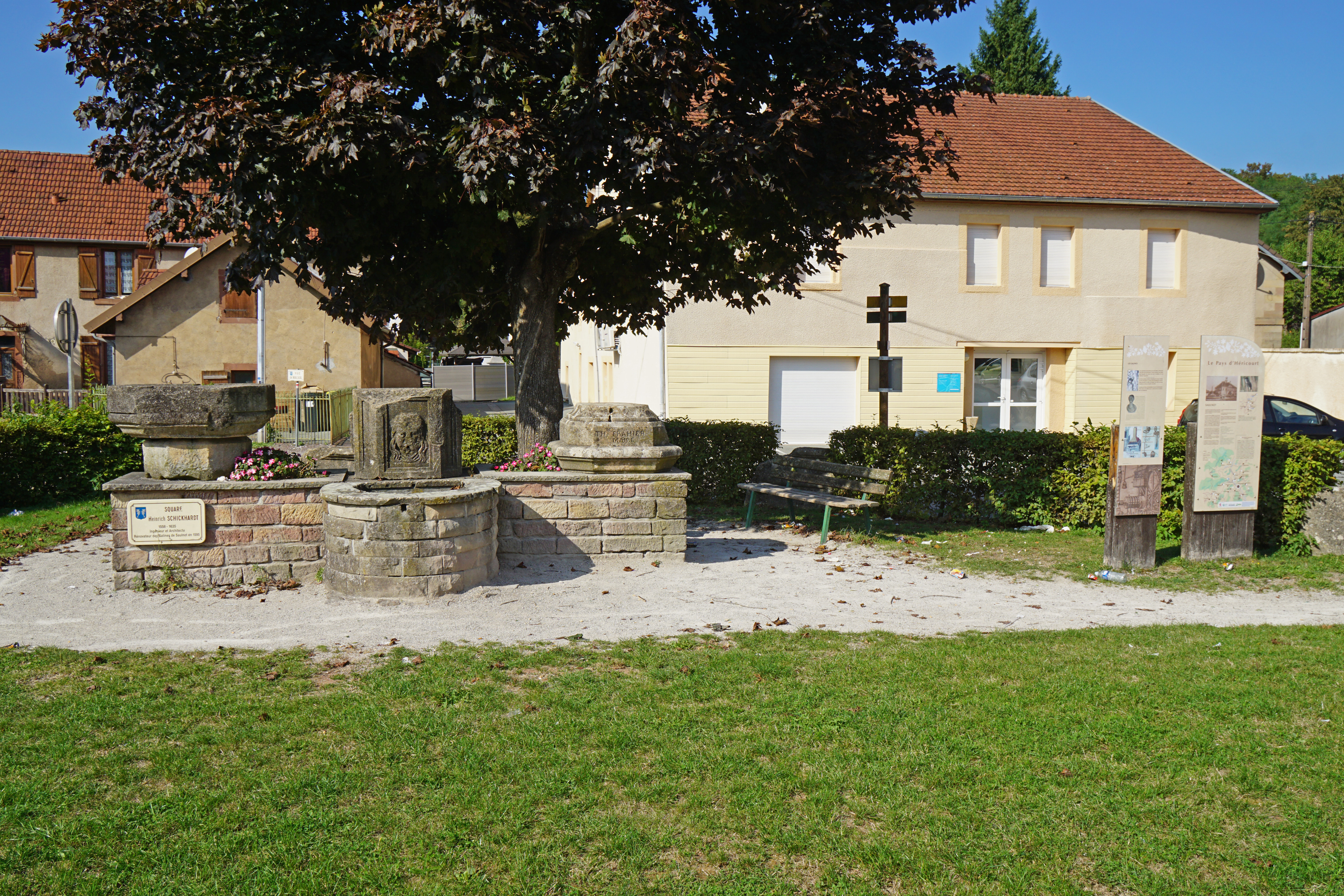
Overview of the square Heinrich-Schickhardt with explanatory panels.

== Coal mines ==
=== History ===
The discovery of coal in the Keuperian basin dates back to the late 16th century. At that time, the Saulnot saltworks (in the seigneury of Granges) used two boilers to evaporate brine—one powered by coal and the other by wood. The miners who extracted coal from the hills were paid in cash and candles.

In 1589, coal was discovered in Corcelles and mining began to reduce the saltworks' wood consumption. By 1594, nineteen miners were working at the Assemont coal mines. However, the coal was of poor quality, producing thick smoke and a bad smell. Accidents already occurred: suffocation from bad air at the Assemont mines in 1615, and the asphyxiation of young workers at the Saulnot mines in 1616. After a period of activity from 1610 to 1628, extraction slowed and ceased in 1635, before resuming in 1654.

In 1714–1715, a new seam was discovered in Saulnot, and a test report was issued for using this fuel to evaporate salt, drawn up by experts from Montbéliard. At the time, workers did not have safety regulations, and the mining operation was poorly organized. It was not until the 1744 ordinance that working conditions were officially regulated. Activity resumed between 1768 and 1772. On March 4, 1770, Jacques Liébiger obtained exclusive rights to extract coal throughout the seigneury of Granges. He was granted the Saulnot concession—2,400 toises in diameter (centered around the two main shafts)—for thirty years.

October 4, 1826, the Corcelles concession, covering an area of 1,485 hectares, was granted to Messrs. Noblot Fils, Méquillet, and others by royal ordinance. Samples taken around 1831 from works located 35 meters underground and 600 meters from the Corcelles church bell tower revealed hard coal. The coke derived from it appeared metallic, blistered, and porous. A shaft was dug near the church of Saulnot in 1832. That same year, the mine employed 25 workers.

The mines closed in 1849. Before that date, up to 1,000 tons of coal were extracted annually, particularly from a 36-meter-deep shaft. The mines were reopened, and the concession was later merged with others by presidential decree on March 14, 1879.

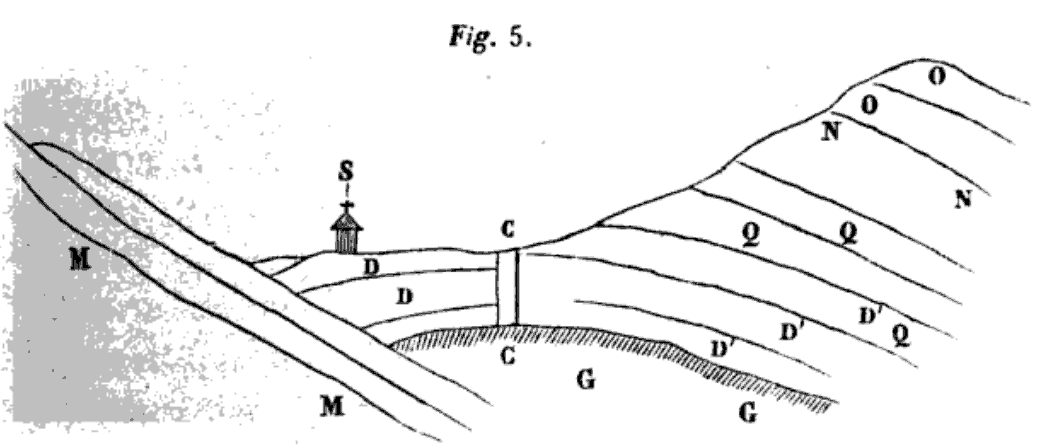
A mine shaft in Saulnot.

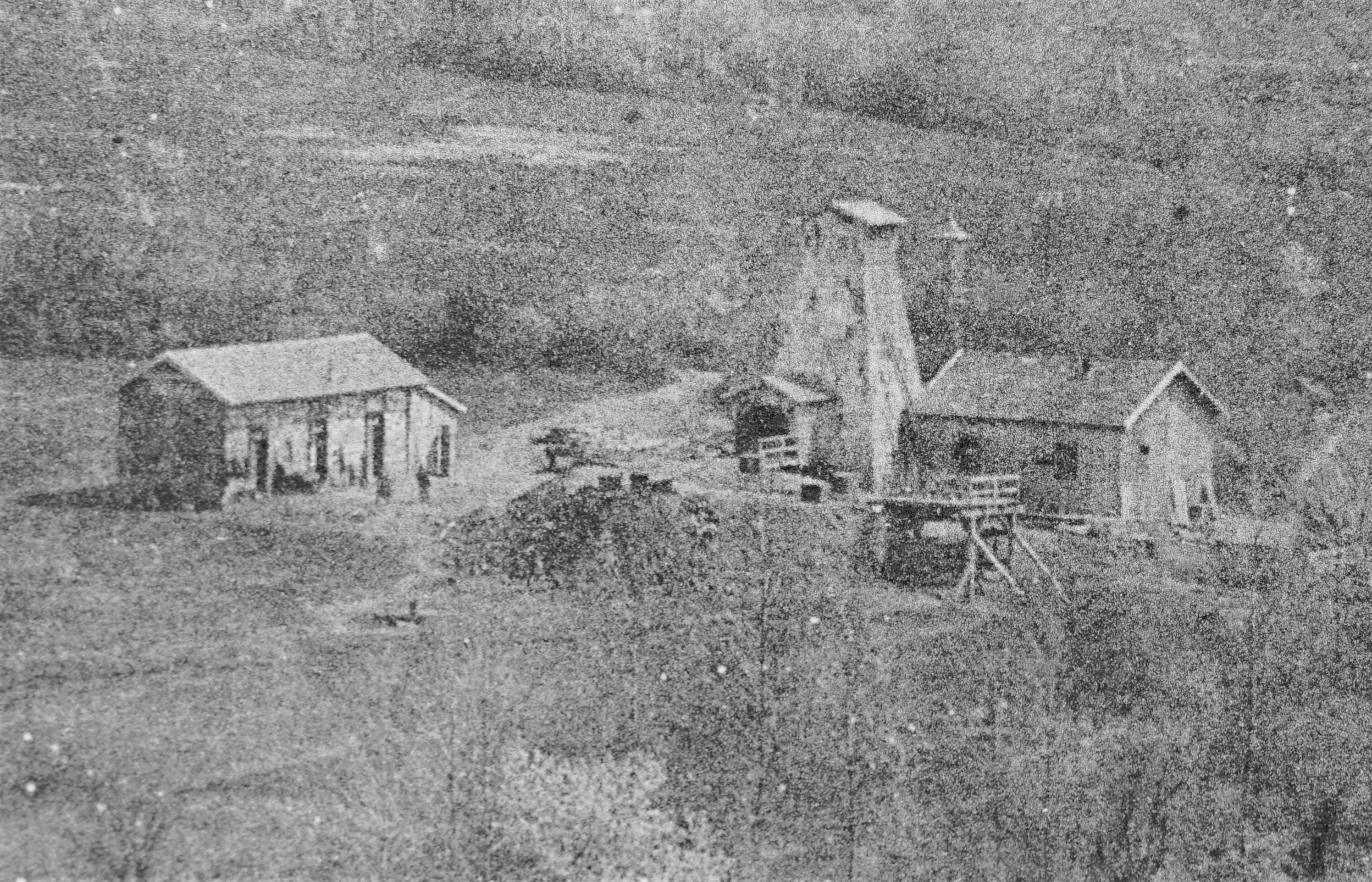
Surface infrastructure of shaft D at the beginning of the 20th century.

At the beginning of the 20th century, mining activity was particularly intense north of Corcelles, with seven shafts dug between 1911 and 1921, of which five were recorded by the Bureau of Geological and Mining Research (BRGM):

- Shafts A and B, used before 1916, were for extracting hard coal, whose extraction was difficult.
- Shaft C was a prospecting shaft.
- Shafts D and E were the only ones active during World War I; the former was 33 meters deep and used for extraction, while the latter was used for ventilation. Both had large spoil heaps compared to other sites within the concession. The coal was transported via the vicinal railways of Haute-Saône to be used at the Gouhenans saltworks until extraction ceased in 1921.

In 1923, the representative of the Gouhenans Mining and Industrial Company, Mr. Gaillard, submitted a request to relinquish the concession. This relinquishment was officially decreed on February 17, 1925.

To cope with shortages caused by the Occupation, new prospecting was launched in several small coal basins that escaped the occupier’s quotas. In 1941, a report by Mr. Foresin concluded that around 8,000 tons of coal could still be extracted at Corcelles via a sloped gallery, but mining activity was not resumed, unlike at the Gémonval and Vy-lès-Lure concessions, which were active from 1942 to 1944.

=== Remains ===
At the beginning of the 21st century, the remains of three mine shafts from the Corcelles coal mines, visible on IGN maps, still exist near the Rhin-Rhône high-speed rail line, along with their spoil heaps. In December 2012, Shaft E was open to a depth of 10.5 meters; it had a regular rectangular section, measuring two meters by three meters. Cavers from Héricourt visited the site on January 4, 2013, and found that the bottom of the shaft was unstable. As a result, the municipality secured the area, but it was not filled in, as the bottom of the shaft was not reached.

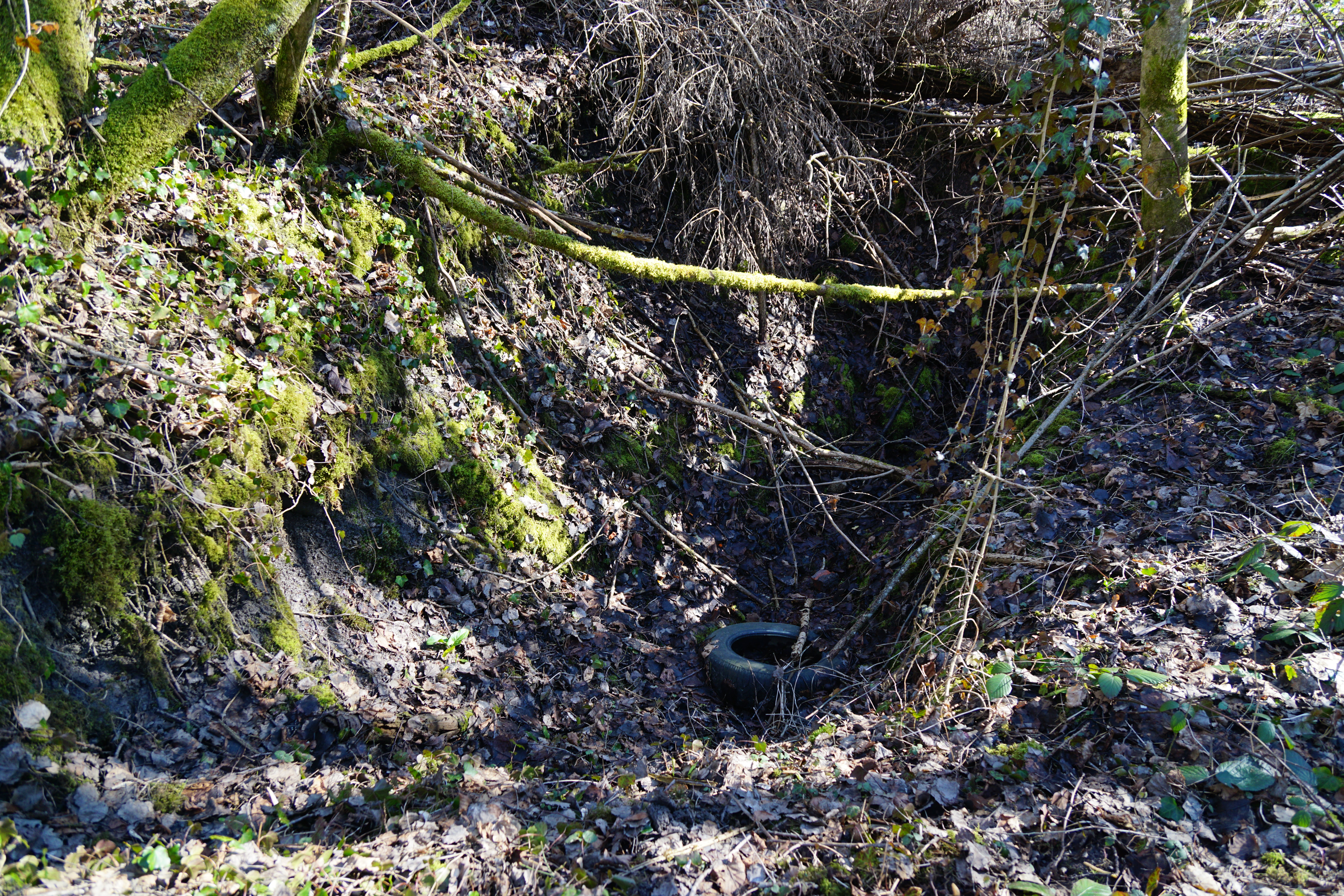
The former D pit in Corcelles.

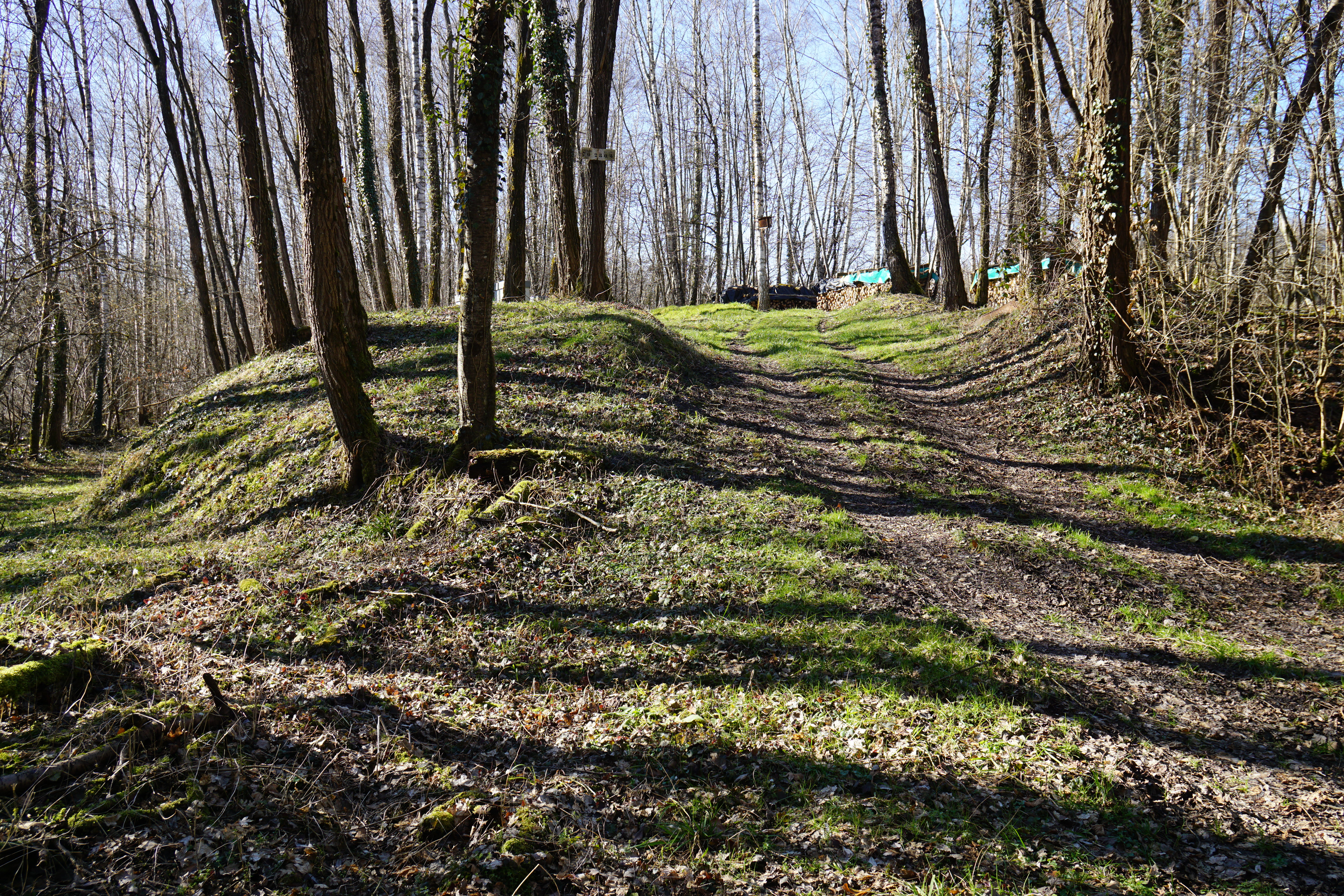
The slag heap of pit D.

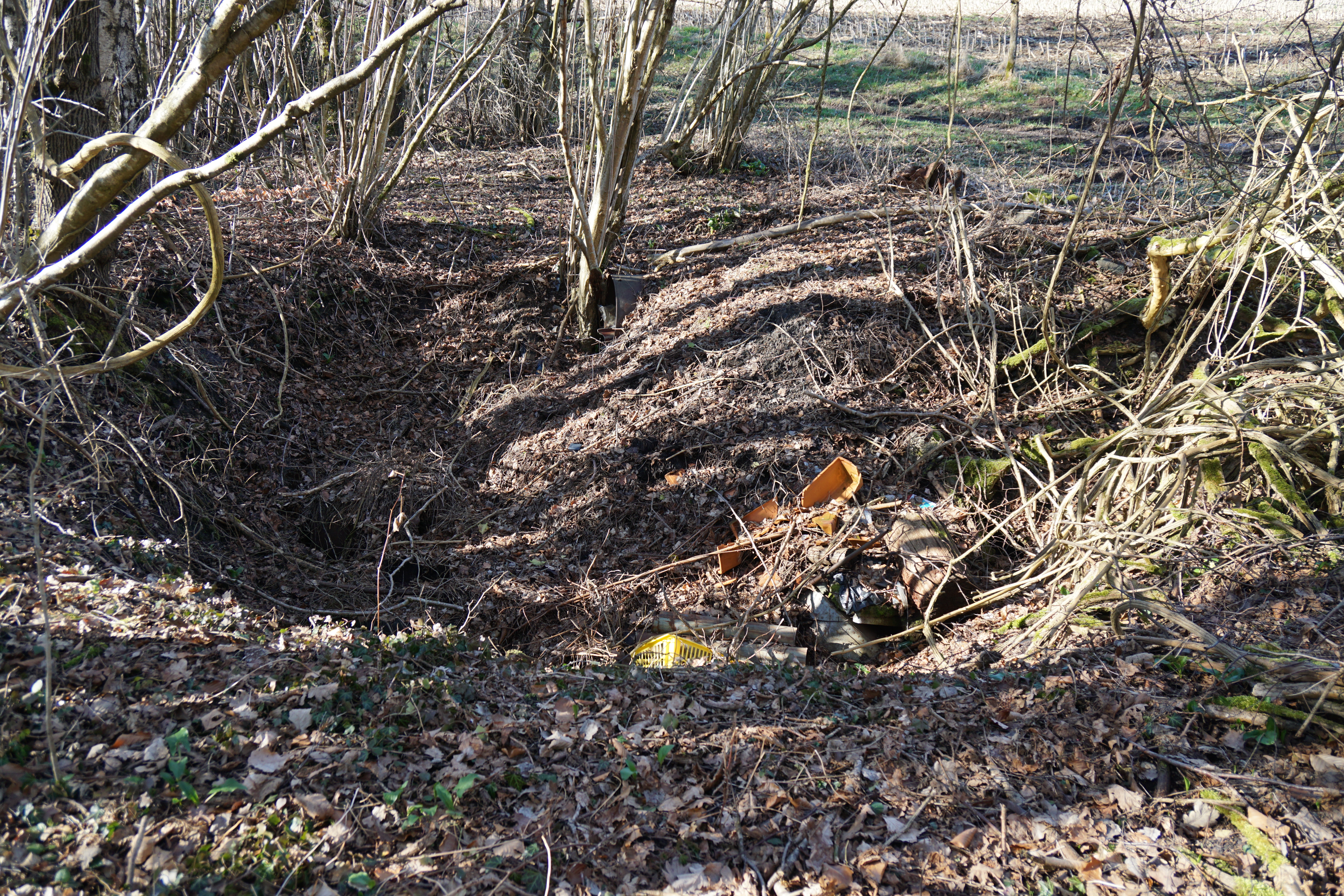
View of pit F.

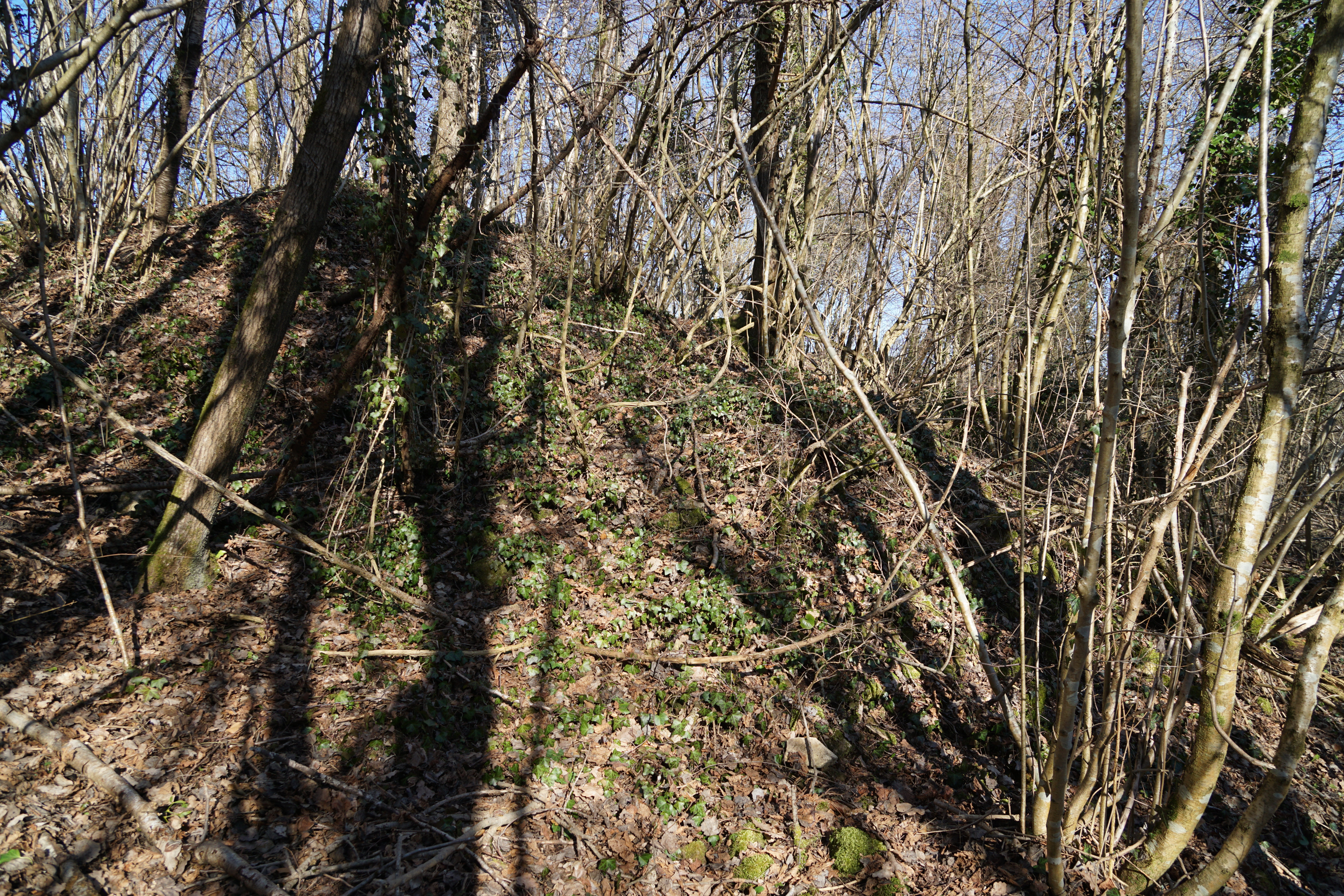
The slag heap of pit F.

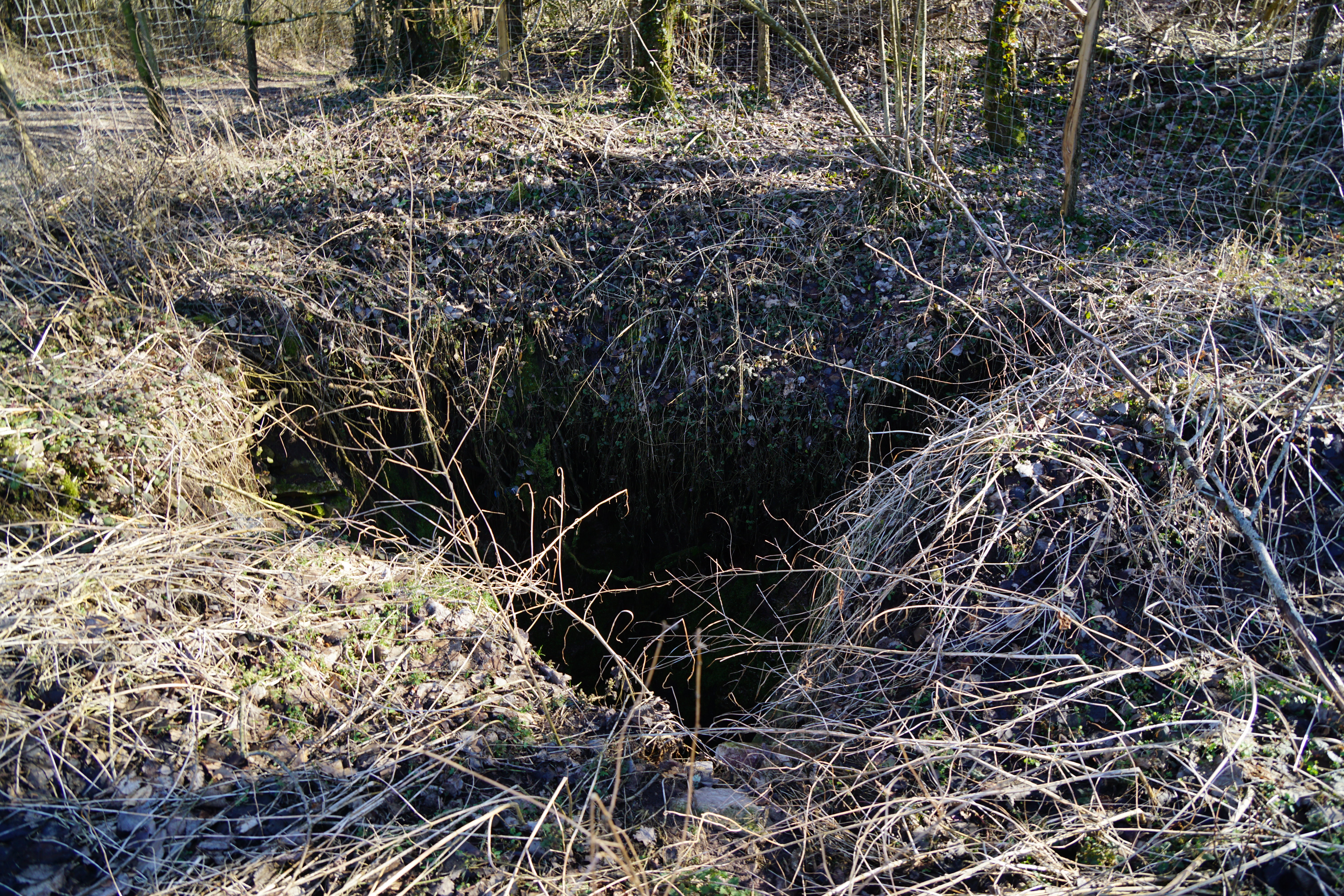
The former open pit (E).

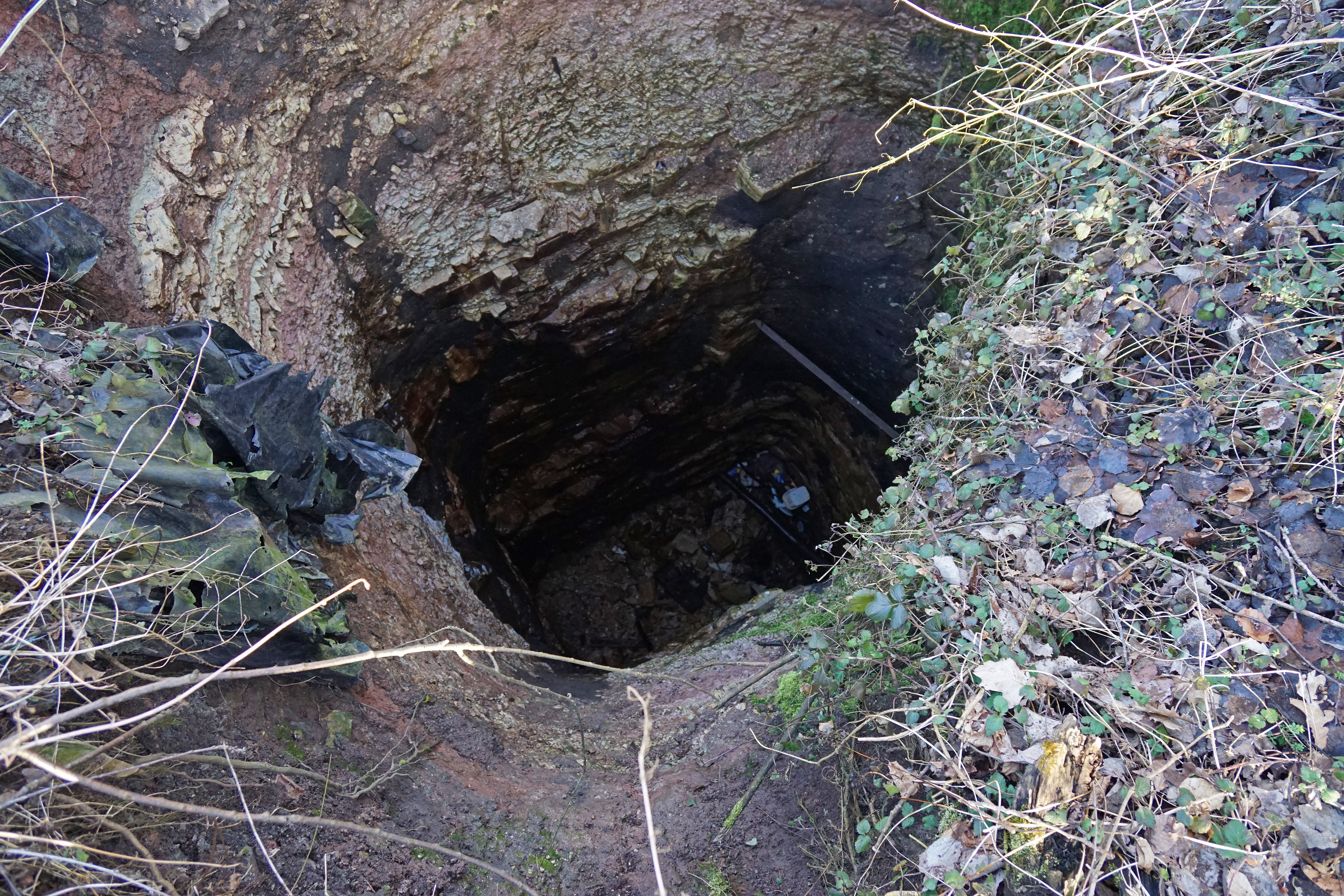
Bird's eye view (pit E).

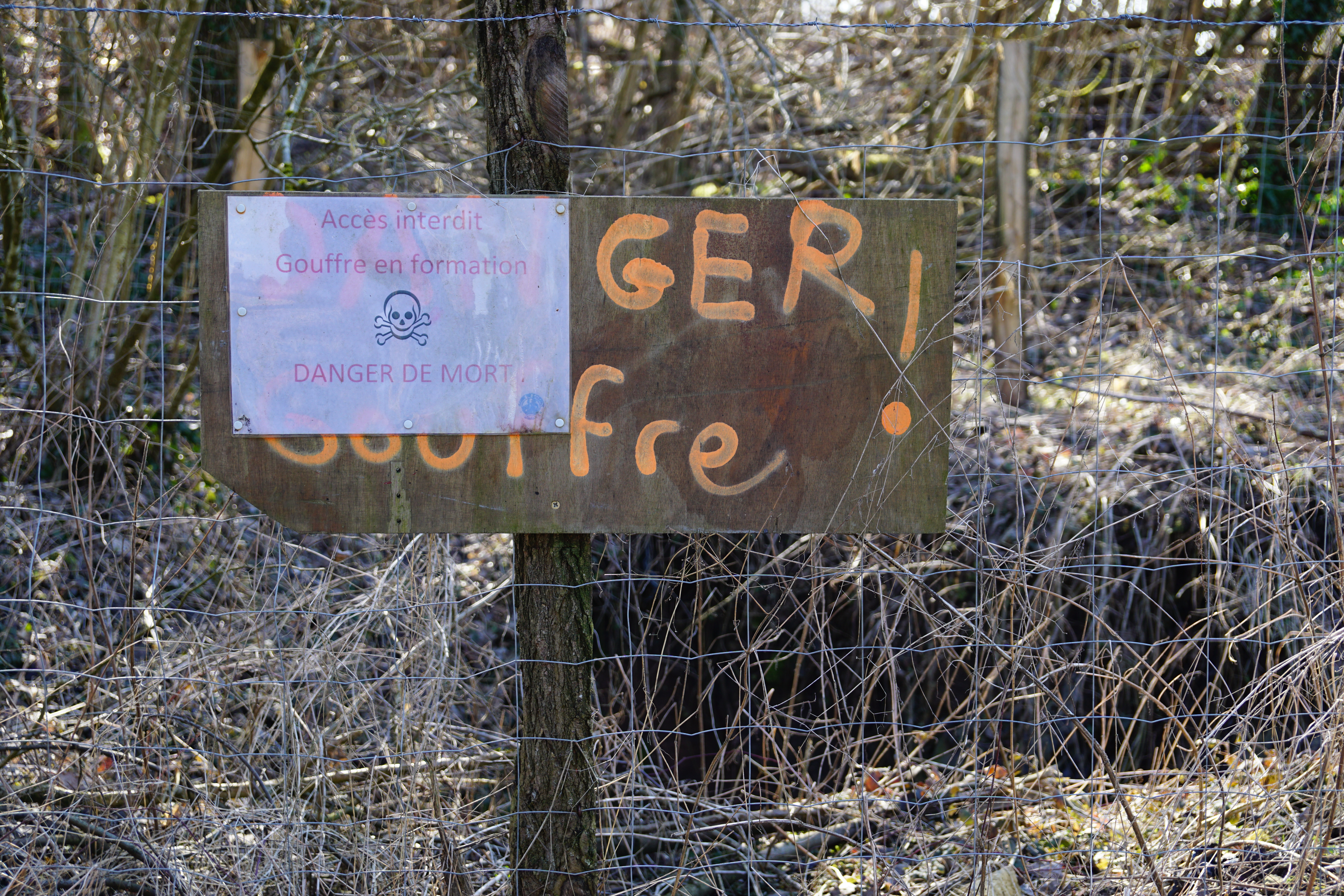
Warning sign (pit E).

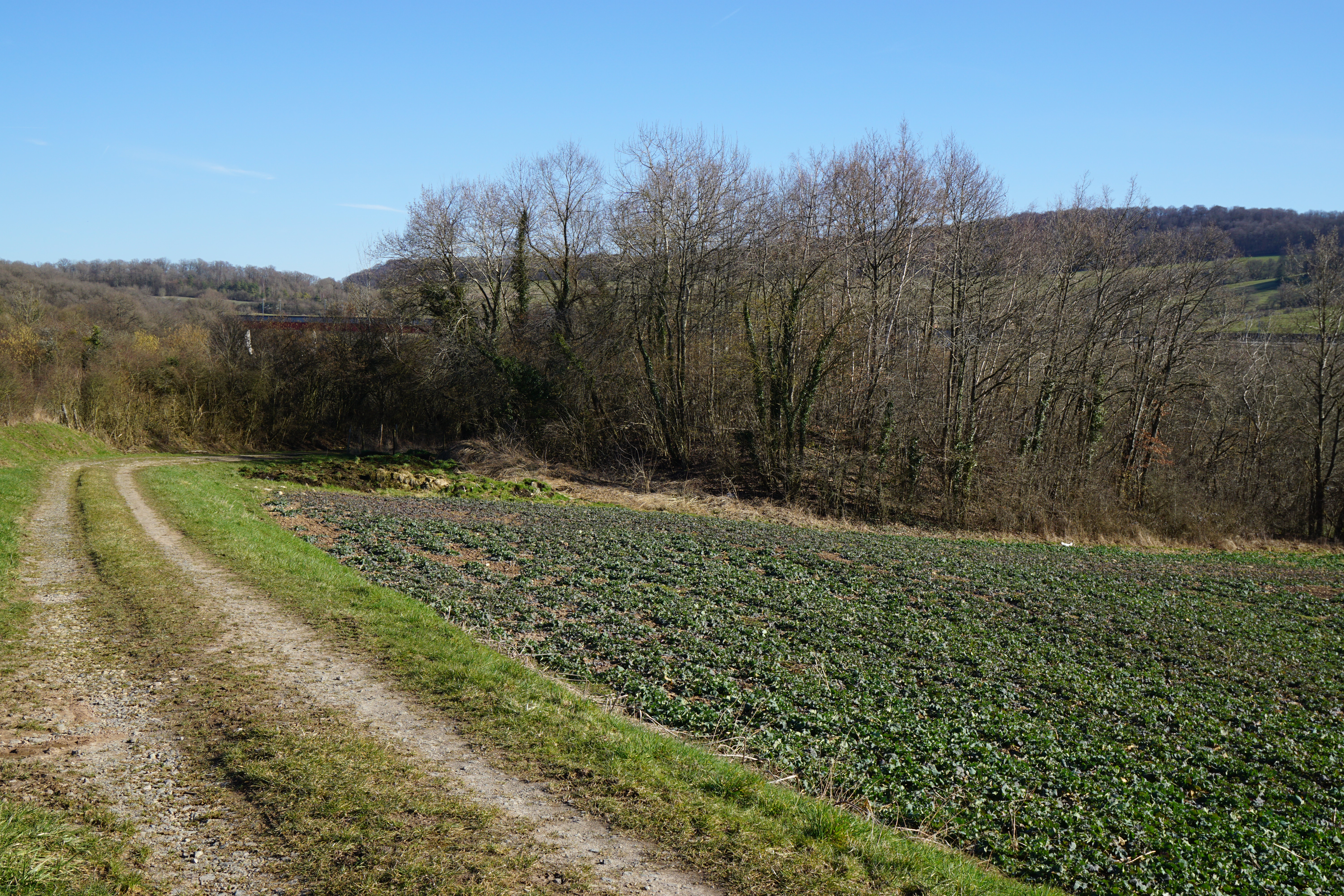
General view with the slag heap (pit E).

=== Production ===
In 1838, 600 tons of lean coal produced from the Corcelles and Gémonval concessions were consumed in the Doubs department.

Between 1911 and 1921, 67,700 tons were extracted at Corcelles, with an average annual production of 6,100 tons.

Evolution of coal mining in the Gémonval basin (including Saulnot and Gouhenans)
	1911	1912	1913	1914	1915	1916	1917	1918	1919	1920	1921
Production (approximate) in thousands of tons	5.7	6.5	7.5	8.75	6	3.1	9.5	10.6	5.2	3.9	0.95

== See also ==
- Saulnot
- Salt mining
- Haute-Saône Keuperian coalfield

== Bibliography ==
- Société d'agriculture, lettres, sciences et arts de la Haute-Saône (1831). Recueil agronomique, industriel et scientifique [Agronomic, industrial and scientific collection] (in French). Vol. 3–4. pp. 345–351.
- Laurens, A (1841). Annuaire départemental du Doubs [Doubs county directory] (in French). pp. 129–131.
- Suchaux, L (1866). La Haute-Saône: dictionnaire historique, topographique et statistique des communes du département [La Haute-Saône: historical, topographical and statistical dictionary of the department's municipalities] (in French).
- Thirria, Édouard (1869). Manuel à l'usage de l'habitant du département de la Haute-Saône [Handbook for people living in the department of Haute-Saône] (in French). pp. 182–186.
- Dormois, R; Ricours, J (1943). Houille triasique sur le versant N.O. du Jura [Triassic coal on the NW slope of the Jura] (PDF) (in French). BRGM.
- BRGM (1998). Ancienne concession de houille de Vy-lès-Lure (70) : Etat des lieux [Former Vy-lès-Lure (70) coal concession: Inventory] (PDF) (in French).
- Benoit, Paul (1999). Le Charbon de Terre en Europe Occidentale Avant L'usage Industriel Du Coke [Coal in Western Europe Before The Industrial Use Of Coke] (in French). Brepols. ISBN 978-2-503-50891-7.
- Koch-Mathian, J.Y (2001). Inventaire des anciennes mines du département de la Haute-Saône [Inventory of the old mines of the department of Haute-Saône] (in French). DRIRE Franche-Comté.
- Coulon, Eric (2004). Bourgs et villages de Haute-Saône [Towns and villages of Haute-Saône]. Sites et villages (in French). Cabédita Editions. ISBN 2-88295-418-2.
- Morin, Denis (2008). "La saline de Melecey-Fallon (Haute-Saône). Traditions et innovations techniques dans la fabrication du sel au XIXe siècle… Quand le bois remplace le charbon de terre" [The Melecey-Fallon saltworks (Haute-Saône). Traditions and technical innovations in salt production in the 19th century... When wood replaced coal]. Sel, eau, forêt. D'hier à aujourd'hui [Salt, water, forest. From yesterday to today] (in French). Besançon: Presses universitaires de Franche-Comté. pp. 479–504. doi:10.4000/books.pufc.25777. ISBN 978-2-84867-230-4.
- Paygnard, Marc (2010). La Haute-Saône guide découverte [Haute-Saône discovery guide] (in French). Éditions Noires Terres.
- Clerget, Yves. Il était une fois... des salines en Franche-Comté [Once upon a time... there were saltworks in Franche-Comté] (PDF) (in French). Service éducatif du Muséum Cuvier Montbéliard & Action culturel du Rectorat. Archived from the original (PDF) on October 7, 2015.
- Debras, Sylvie (2013). Du sel dans nos ballades [Spice up your walks]. En vadrouille (in French). Mille et un chemins. ISBN 979-10-90357-02-0. ISSN 2103-7361.
- Trebuck, S (2013). Étude détaillée des aléas et mouvements de terrain du district minier de Gémonval et Le Vernoy (25) [Detailed study of the hazards and ground movements of the mining district of Gémonval and Le Vernoy (25)] (in French). Géoderis.
