= Fountains of Ruhans =

- French: Fontaines-lavoirs de Ruhans
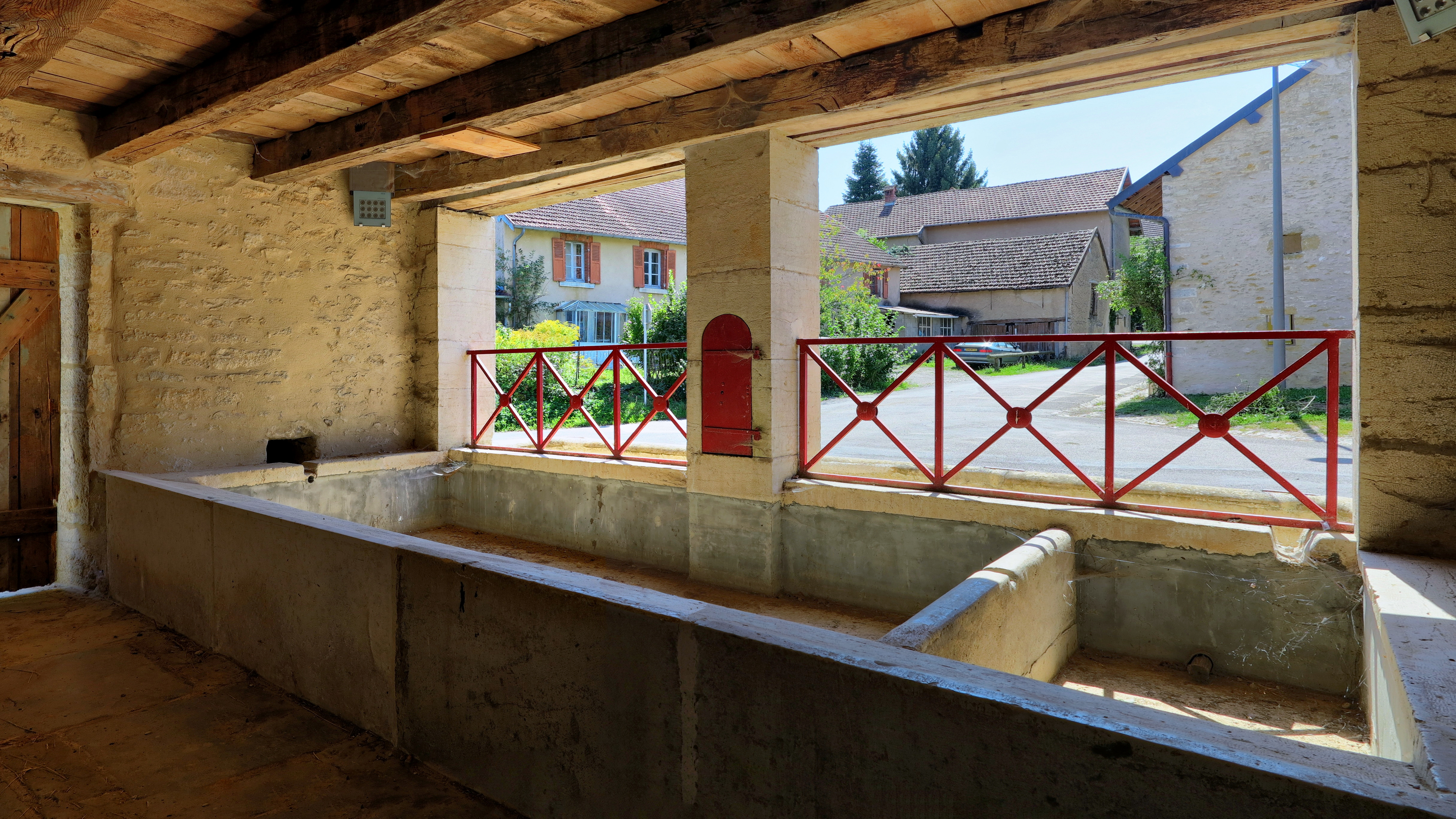
- Fountain of Ruhans (inside)
- 47°27′32″N 6°8′11″E
- Location: Ruhans, Haute-Saône, France
- Type: Washhouse
- Material: Stone
- Completion date: 1864

The fountains of Ruhans are three fountains located in the commune of Ruhans, in France.

== Description ==
The fountain in the center of the village is made up of two wash basins and a drinking trough with a jet stack in the center. It is located on the ground floor of a house owned by the municipality, right next to the town hall.

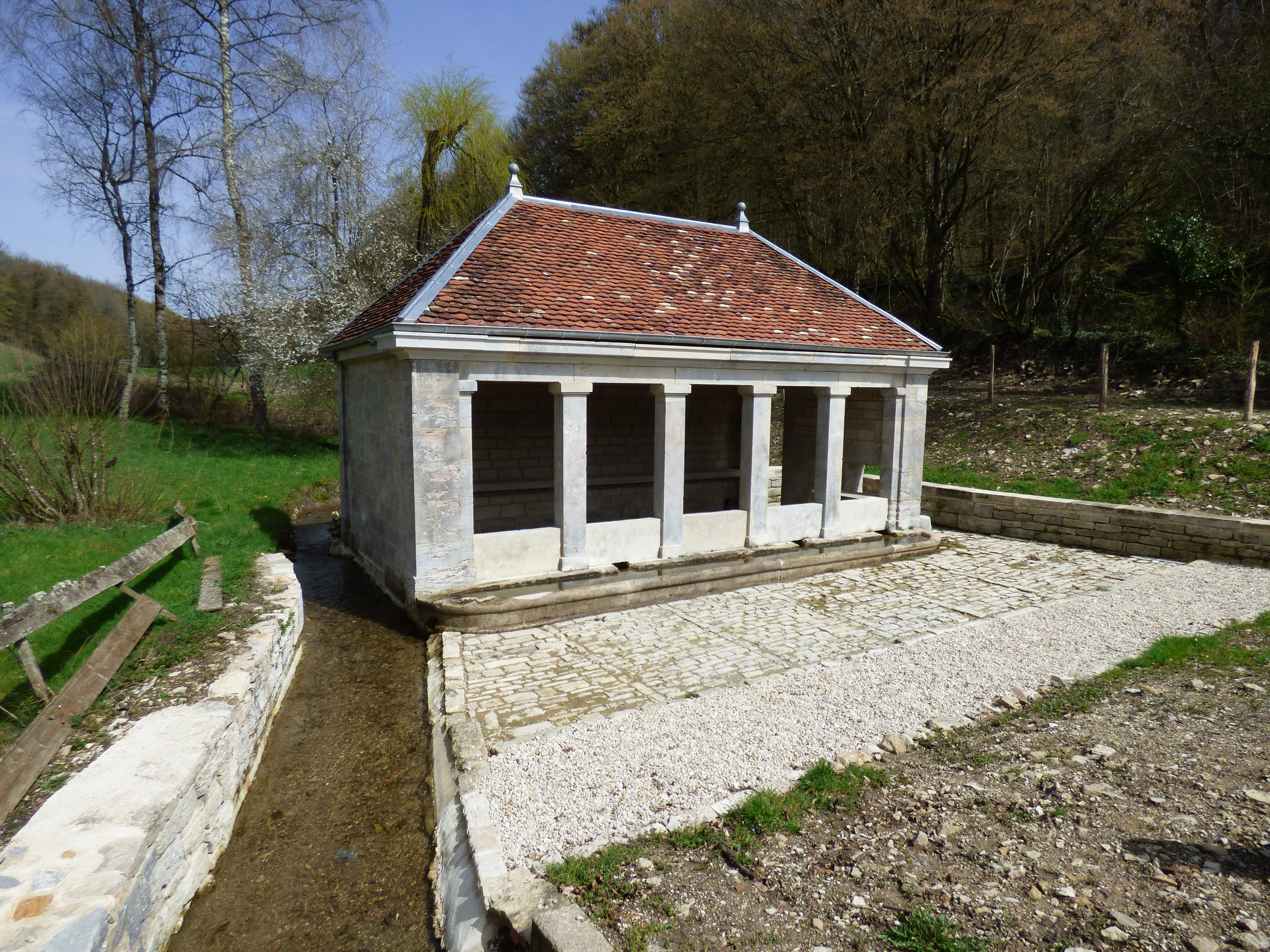
The fountain of Millaudon.

The fountain in the hamlet of Millaudon is fed by the La Quenoche stream. Covered with tiles, it houses a wash house and its southern facade is opened by four pillars. An external stone drinking trough receives the excess water.

Composed of a covered wash house and a stone watering trough, the fountain of La Villedieu-Les-Quenoche has a facade also opened by two cast iron columns.

== Location ==
The set is located in the town of Ruhans, in the French department of Haute-Saône. The fountain in the center is located right next to the town hall of Ruhans. The Millaudon fountain is located in the hamlet of the same name, on the site where the La Quenoche stream intersects the departmental road. The fountain of La Villedieu-Les-Quenoche is located at the entrance of the hamlet of the same name.

== History ==
=== The Ruhans fountain ===
Having no wells at their disposal, the inhabitants of Ruhans have long suffered from difficult access to water. It was in 1831 that the architect Ridoux built cisterns to collect rainwater, cisterns that the architects Lebeuffe and Renahy raised to facilitate drawing in 1843. The building as we know it was only built 1864 by the architect Servas, supplied by a source not far from there, in the territory of Quenoche.

=== The Millaudon fountain ===
Several fountain projects have followed one another but have never been implemented. According to the report by architects Lebeuffe and Renahy, there was only a small pond at the current location of the washhouse. This was built in 1844 with freestone from Le Magnoray or La Malachère.

=== The La Villeudieu-Les-Quenoche fountain ===
The covered washhouse, of rectangular plan by Renahy, replaced in 1858 circular basins built 25 years earlier. It was built with freestone from Andelarrot and La Malachère, while the trough was built with sand stones from Granges-le-Bourg ou Châtillon-sur-Saône.

== Photo gallery ==
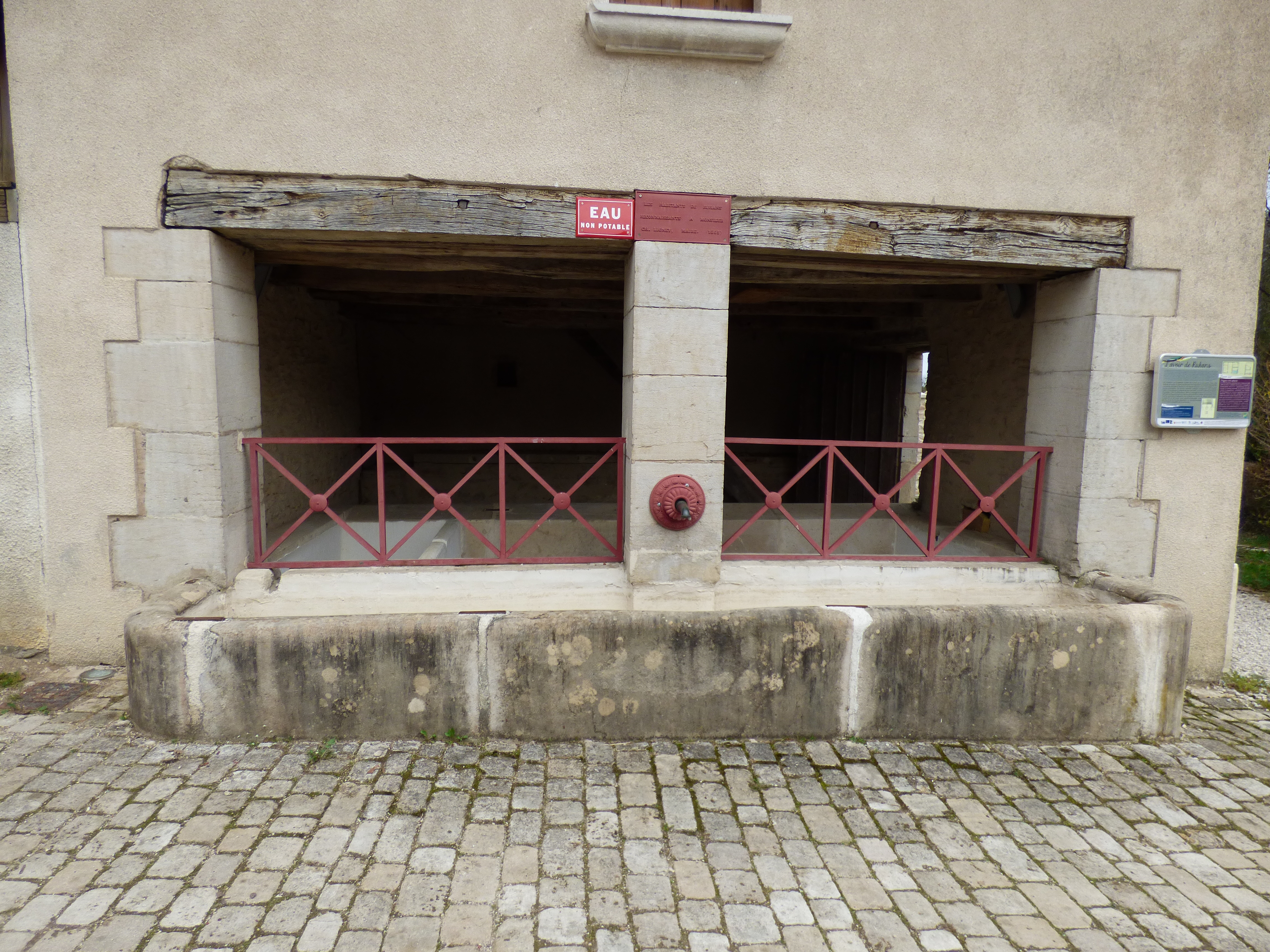
Fountain of Ruhans

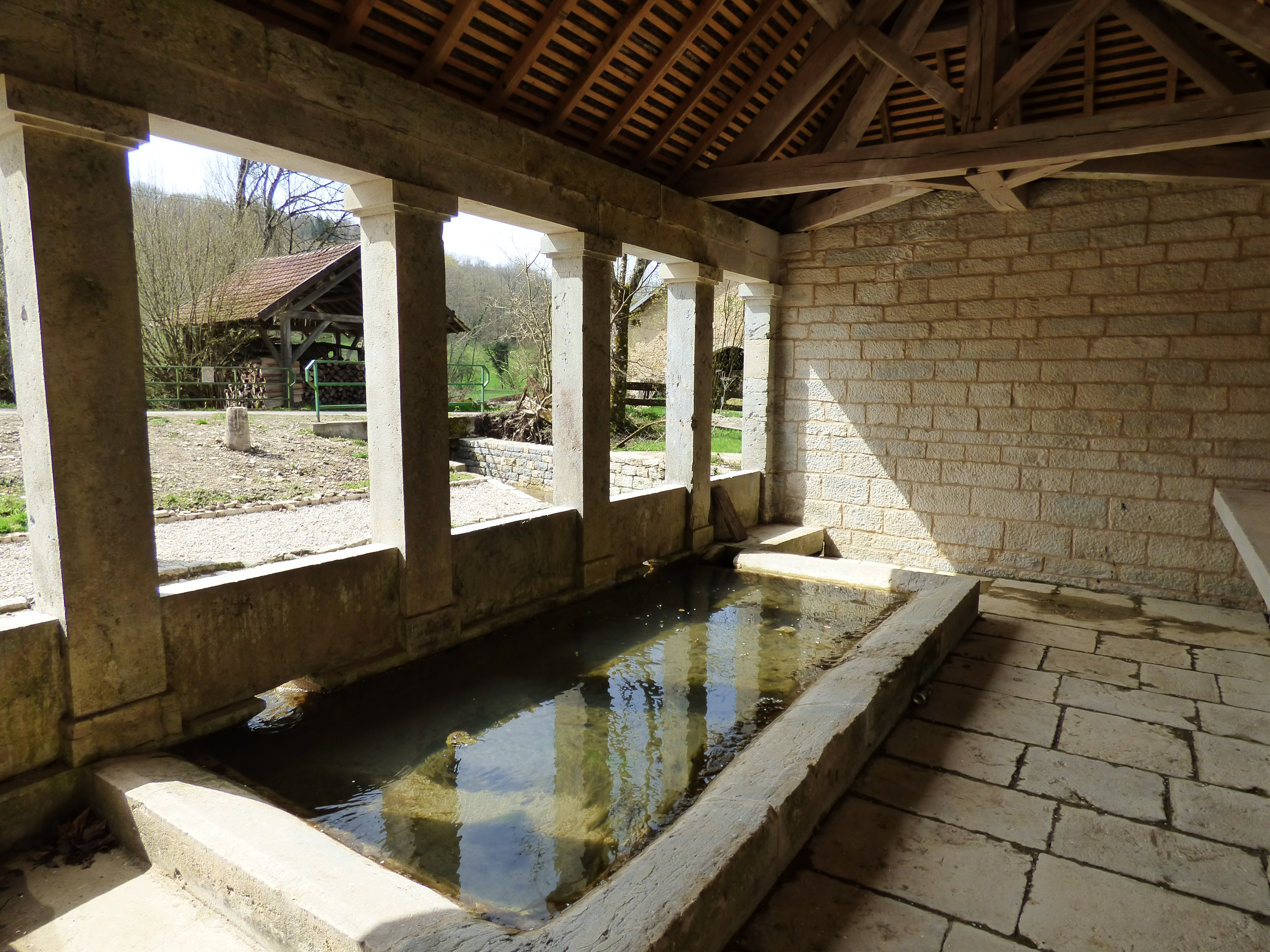
Fountain of Millaudon (inside)

== See also ==
- Fountain
- Lavoir
