= Ruhans =

- Commune
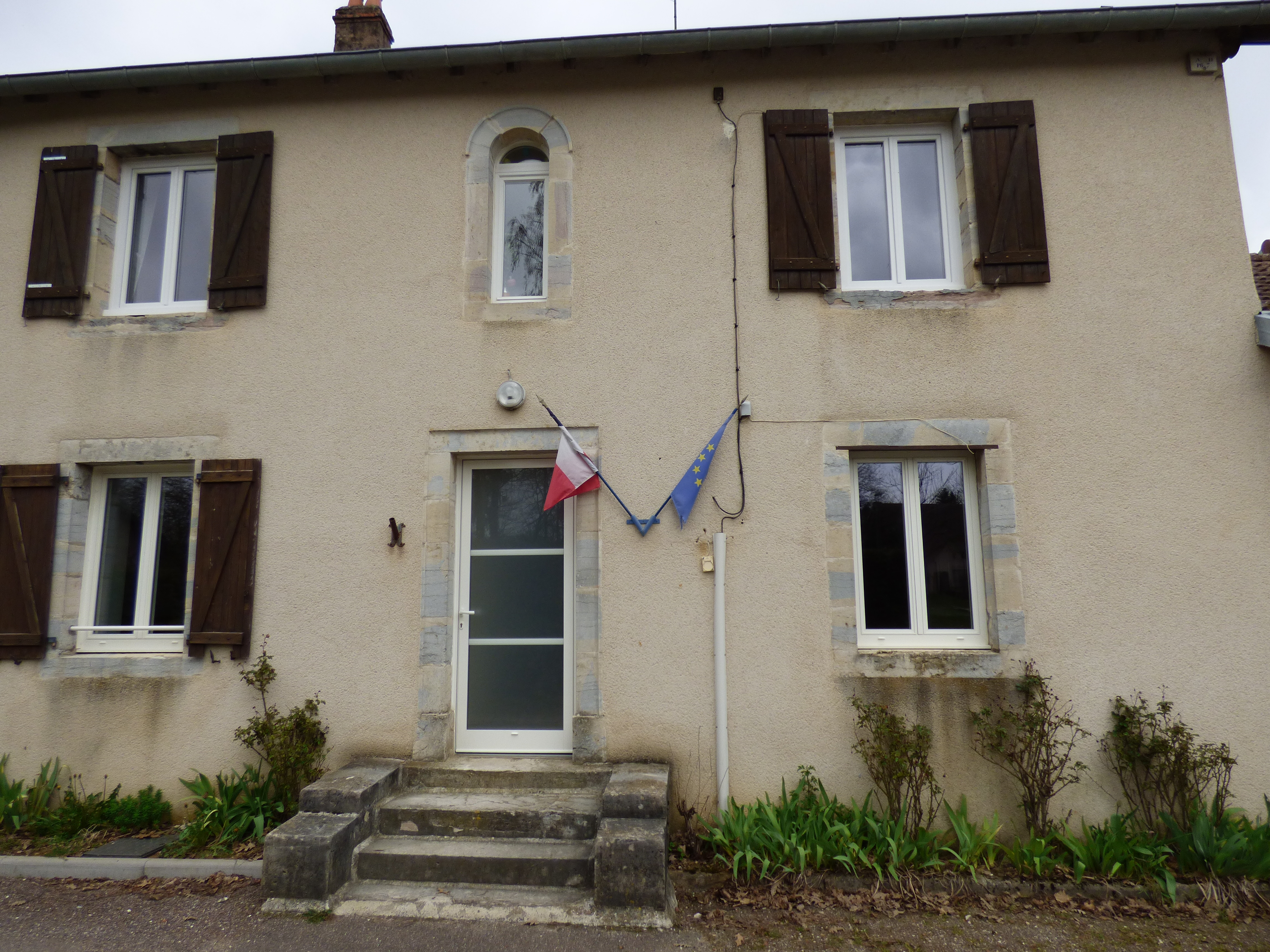
- The town hall in Ruhans
- Location of Ruhans
- Location within France Location within Bourgogne-Franche-Comté
- Coordinates: 47°27′35″N 6°08′12″E
- Country: France
- Region: Bourgogne-Franche-Comté
- Department: Haute-Saône
- Arrondissement: Vesoul
- Canton: Rioz

Government
  - Mayor (2020–2026): Serge Girard
- Area^{1}: 4.95 km^{2} (1.91 sq mi)
- Highest elevation: 362 m (1,188 ft)
- Lowest elevation: 247 m (810 ft)
- Population (2023): 149
  - Density: 30.1/km^{2} (78.0/sq mi)
- Time zone: UTC+01:00 (CET)
  - Summer (DST): UTC+02:00 (CEST)
- INSEE/Postal code: 70456 /70190
- ^{1} French Land Register data, which excludes lakes, ponds, glaciers > 1 km^{2} (0.386 sq mi or 247 acres) and river estuaries.

Ruhans (French pronunciation: [ʁy.ɑ̃]) is a commune in the Haute-Saône department in the region of Bourgogne-Franche-Comté in eastern France.

== See also ==
- Fountains of Ruhans
- Communes of the Haute-Saône department
