= Saulnot =

- Commune
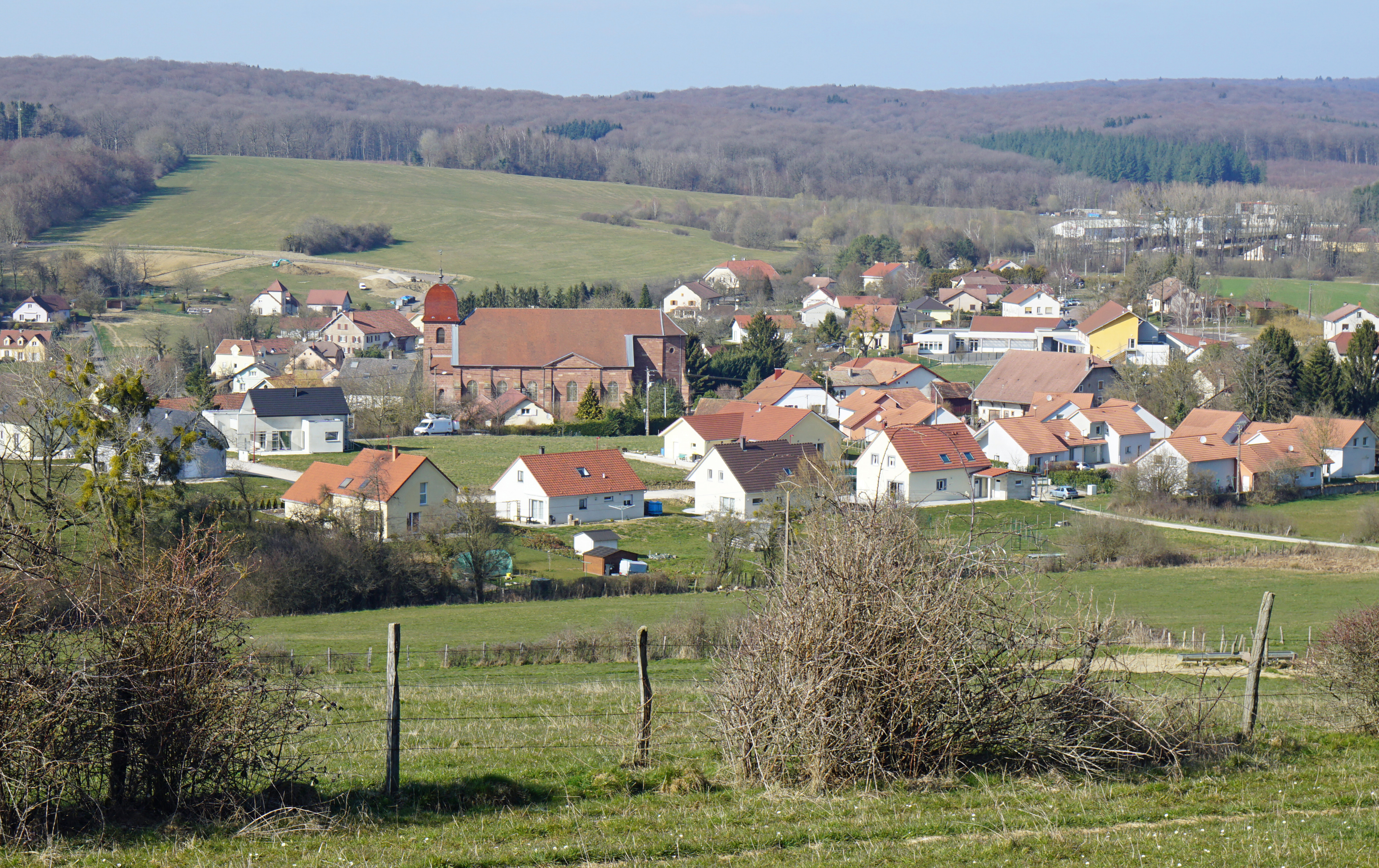
- A general view of Saulnot

- Coat of arms
- Location of Saulnot
- Location within France Location within Bourgogne-Franche-Comté
- Coordinates: 47°33′48″N 6°38′03″E
- Country: France
- Region: Bourgogne-Franche-Comté
- Department: Haute-Saône
- Arrondissement: Lure
- Canton: Héricourt-2
- Intercommunality: CC pays d'Héricourt
- Area^{1}: 26.73 km^{2} (10.32 sq mi)
- Highest elevation: 522 m (1,713 ft)
- Lowest elevation: 324 m (1,063 ft)
- Population (2023): 758
  - Density: 28.4/km^{2} (73.4/sq mi)
- Time zone: UTC+01:00 (CET)
  - Summer (DST): UTC+02:00 (CEST)
- INSEE/Postal code: 70477 /70400
- ^{1} French Land Register data, which excludes lakes, ponds, glaciers > 1 km^{2} (0.386 sq mi or 247 acres) and river estuaries.

Saulnot is a commune in the Haute-Saône department in the region of Bourgogne-Franche-Comté in eastern France. In 1973 it absorbed two former communes: Corcelles and Gonvillars.

Coal mines operated in the village between the 16th century and 1925.

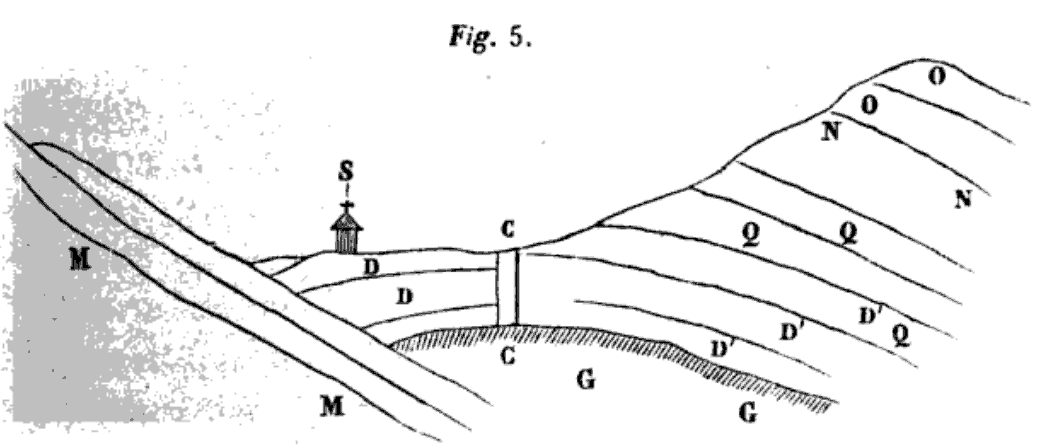
A sectional view of a mine shaft in Saulnot.

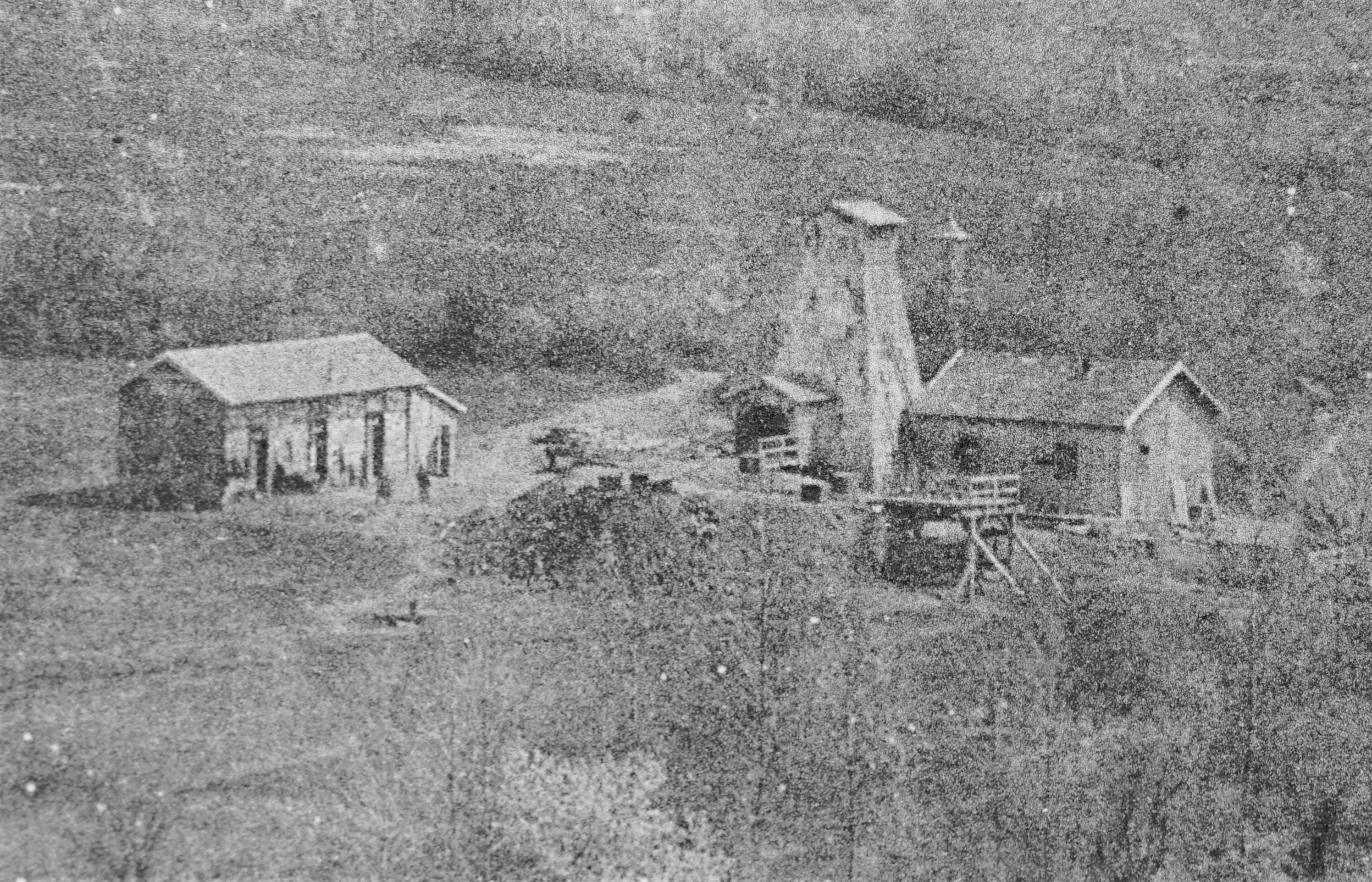
Surface infrastructure of a mine shaft in the start of 20th century.

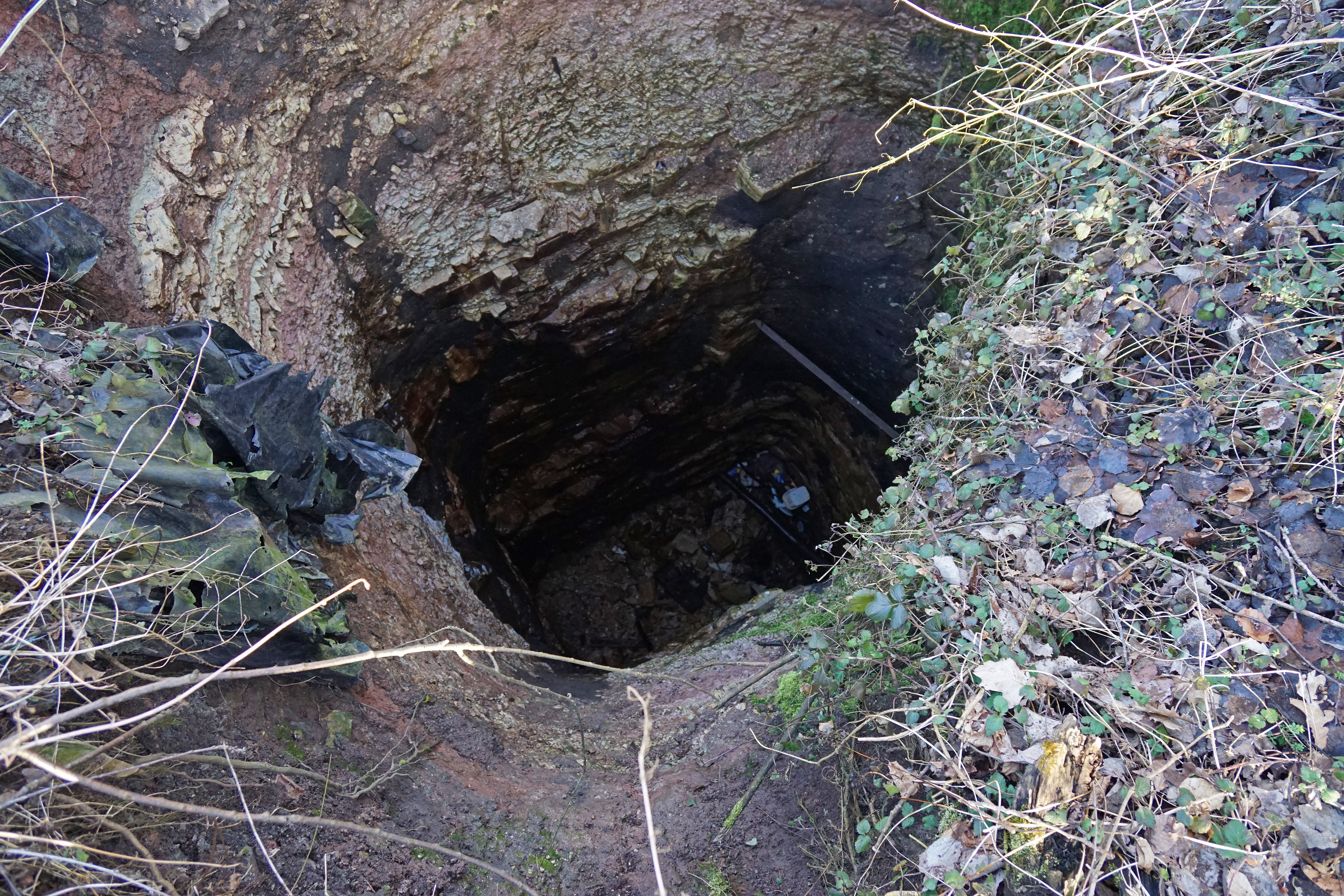
View of an open mine shaft.

== See also ==
- Communes of the Haute-Saône department
- Coal mines and saltworks of Saulnot
- Church of the Beheading of Saint John the Baptist of Saulnot
