= Church of the Beheading of Saint John the Baptist of Saulnot =

Catholic church in Saulnot, France

- Église de la Décollation-de-Saint-Jean-Baptiste
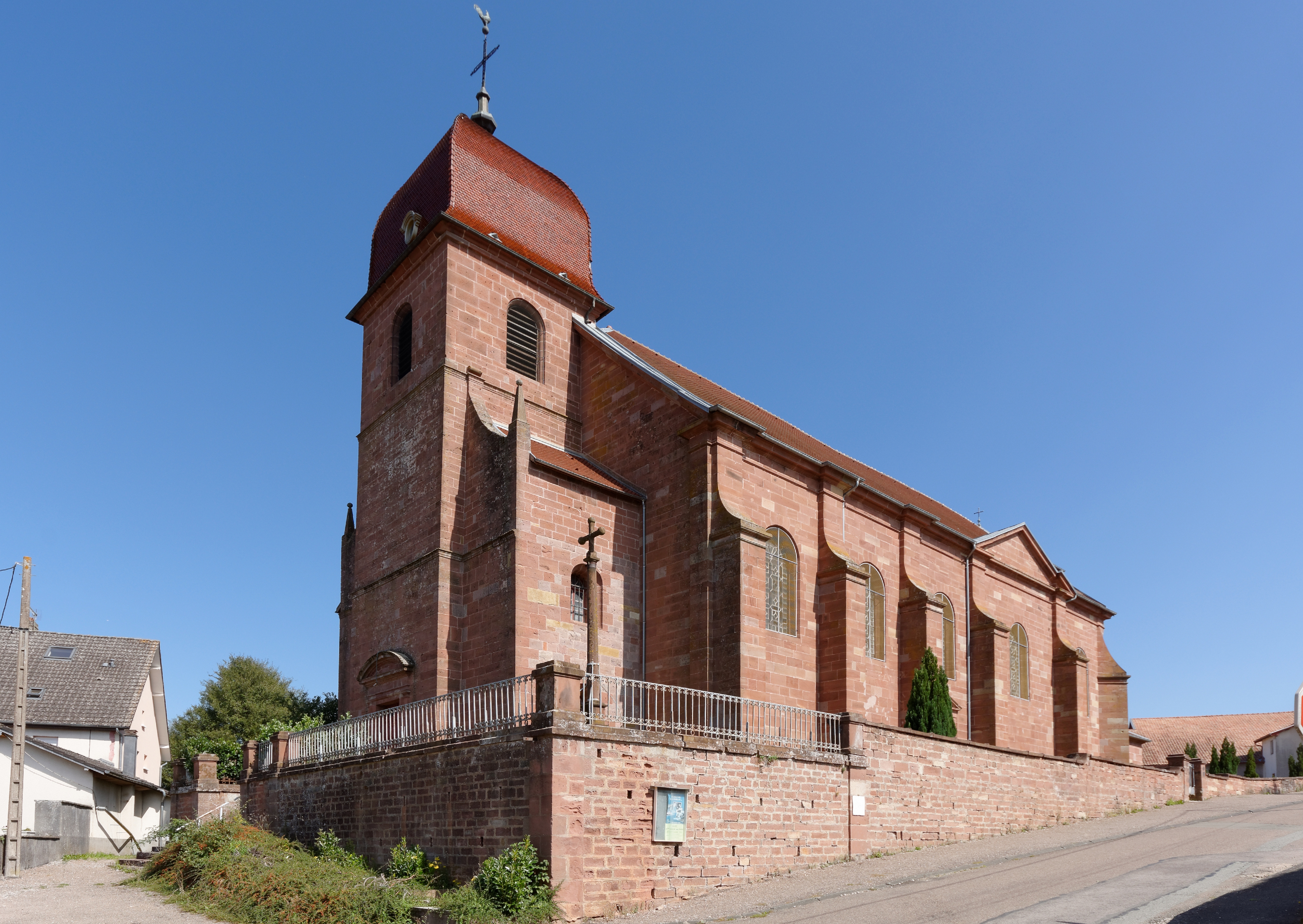

Religion
- Affiliation: Roman Catholic
- Region: Bourgogne-Franche-Comté
- Ecclesiastical or organisational status: Parish church

Location
- Location: Saulnot, Haute-Saône, Bourgogne-Franche-Comté, France
- Municipality: Saulnot
- State: Haute-Saône
- Country: France
- Interactive map of Church of the Beheading of Saint John the Baptist of Saulnot
- Administration: Diocese of Belfort-Montbéliard
- Coordinates: 47.561246°N 6.633620°E

The Church of the Beheading of Saint John the Baptist of Saulnot (Église de la Décollation-de-Saint-Jean-Baptiste) is a Roman Catholic church located in Saulnot, Haute-Saône, France. It is distinguished by its pink hue, derived from the use of Vosges sandstone, and its red Comtois bell tower. The church houses five pieces of furniture listed or classified in the Palissy database.

== Location ==
The church is situated in the commune of Saulnot, in the southeastern part of the Haute-Saône department, within the Bourgogne-Franche-Comté region of France.

It serves as the main church of the Sainte-Lucie parish, which falls under the deanery of Héricourt, part of the Diocese of Belfort-Montbéliard.

== History ==
A parish church is recorded in Saulnot as early as the 12th century. The current structure was rebuilt in 1847, preserving the original bell tower. Prior to the French Revolution, the Abbot of Luxeuil held the right of presentation for the church. It is consecrated to the Beheading of Saint John the Baptist.

In 1832, a shaft for the local coal mines was dug near the church.

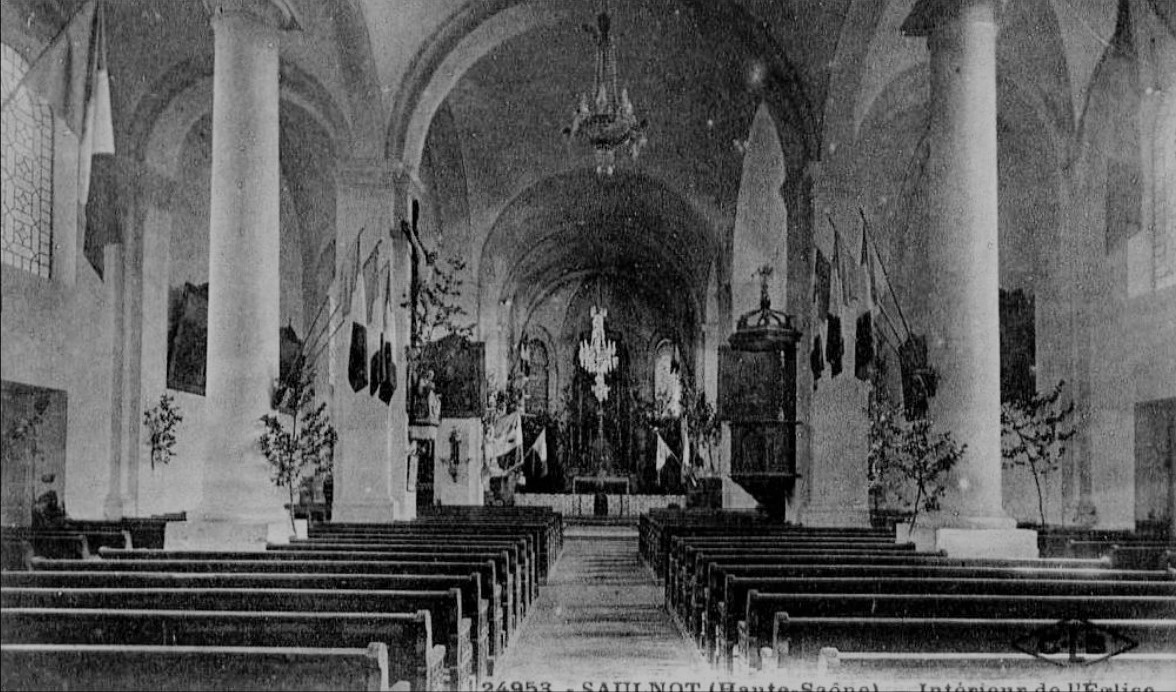
Interior at the beginning of the 20th century

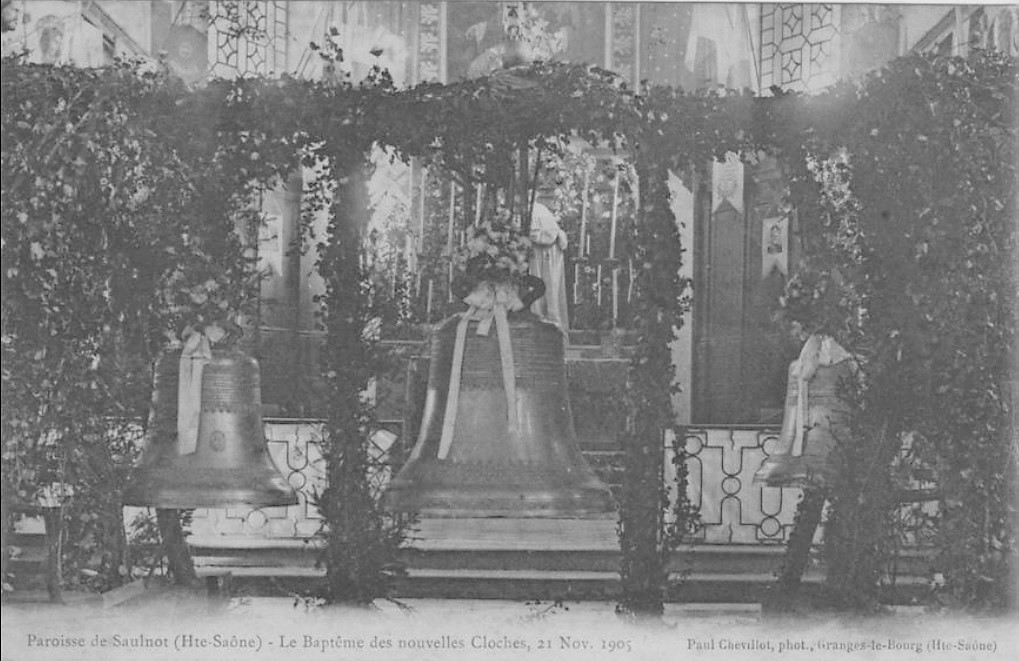
Baptism of new bells in 1905

The church was damaged during bombardments from September to November 1944 and was reconstructed in 1946, retaining its 18th-century Comtois bell tower. At its base lie two tombs, including that of the last lord of Saulnot, Georges Janneot. The church contains a quadrangular holy water font from the 12th and 13th centuries.

== Architecture ==
The church is constructed using fine-grained pink Vosges sandstone, described as "fairly soft and of mediocre quality" in a material strength test. This sandstone was quarried locally by Messrs. Frahier and Bouvet. The same material was used for the Protestant temple in Bussurel.

The structure is further distinguished by its Comtois bell tower, covered with red glazed tiles characteristic of the region.

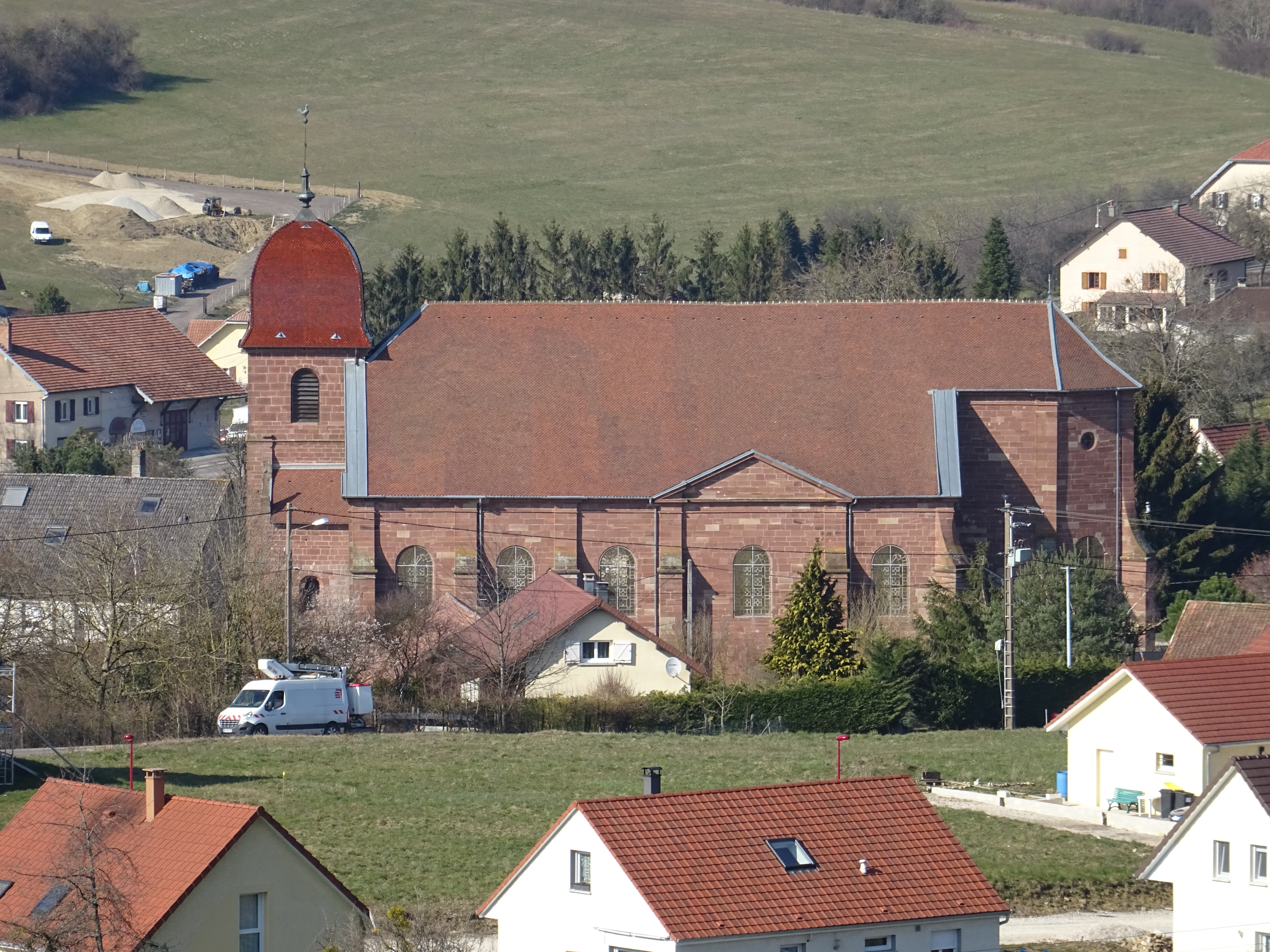

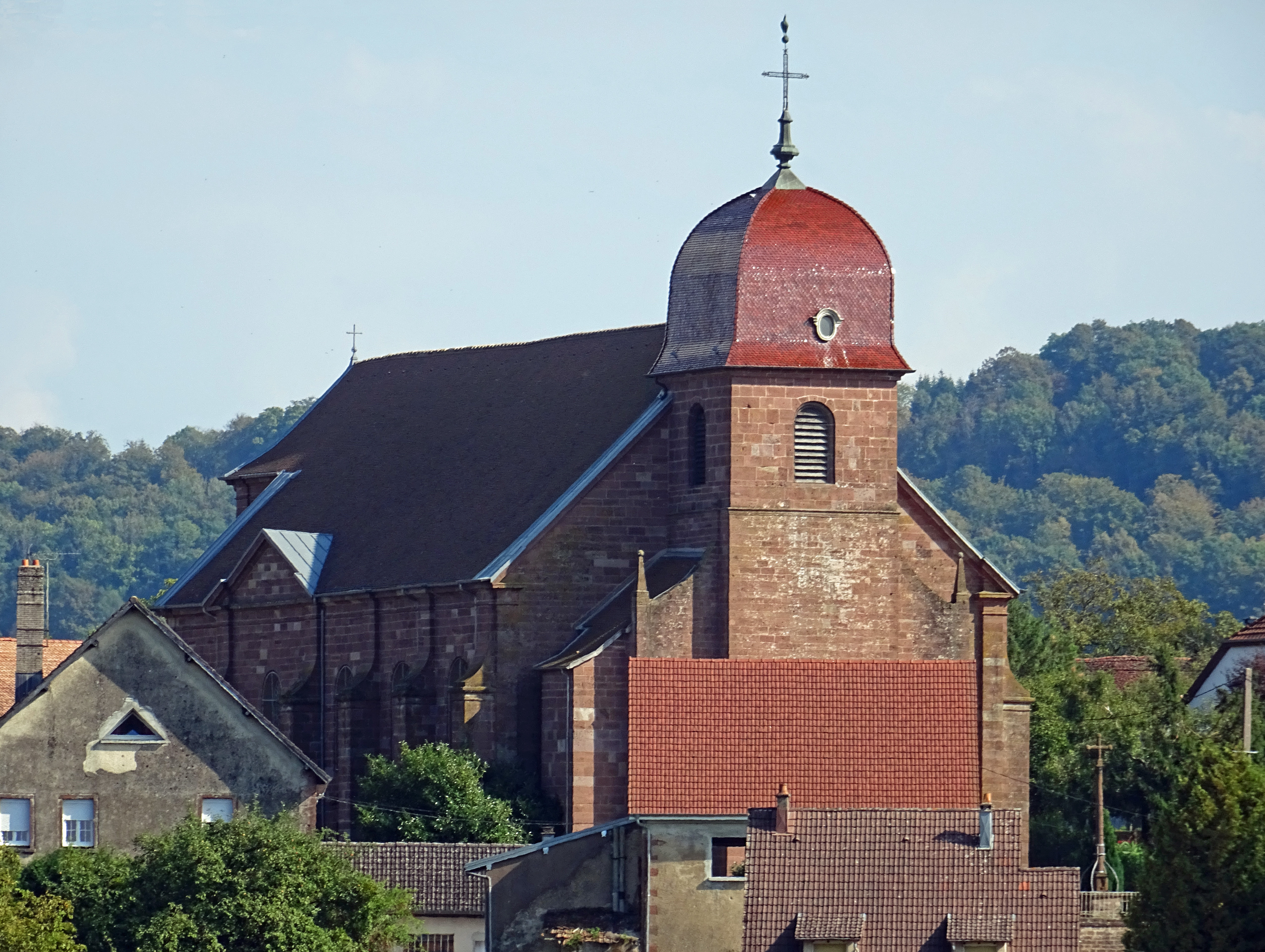

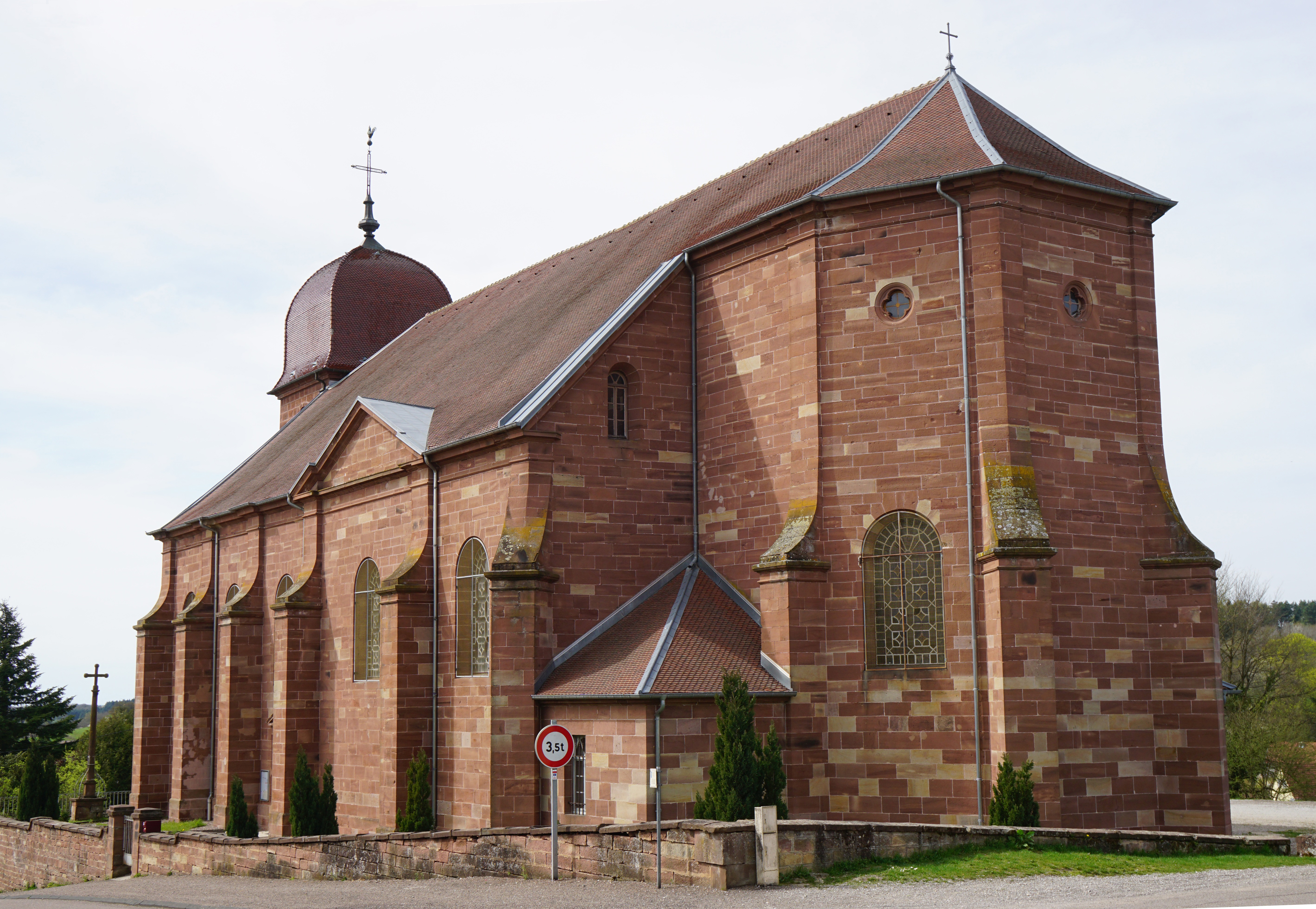

== Protected furnishings ==
The church houses five items listed or classified in the Palissy database:

- A wrought iron chancel railing from the late 18th century, listed on 5 December 2005.
- A gilded silver monstrance from 1768, classified on 7 May 1971.
- A chalice from 1706, classified on 7 May 1971.
- A chalice from 1779, classified on 7 May 1971.
- A gilded silver pyx-chrismatory for the sick from the mid-18th century, classified on 7 May 1971.

== See also ==
- Saulnot
- Bourgogne-Franche-Comté
- Diocese of Belfort-Montbéliard
- Luxeuil Abbey
- Beheading of Saint John the Baptist

== Bibliography ==
- Suchaux, Louis (1866). La Haute-Saône : dictionnaire historique, topographique et statistique des communes du département [Haute-Saône: Historical, Topographic, and Statistical Dictionary of the Department's Communes] (in French). Imprimerie et lithographie de A. Suchaux.
