= Quenoche =

- Commune
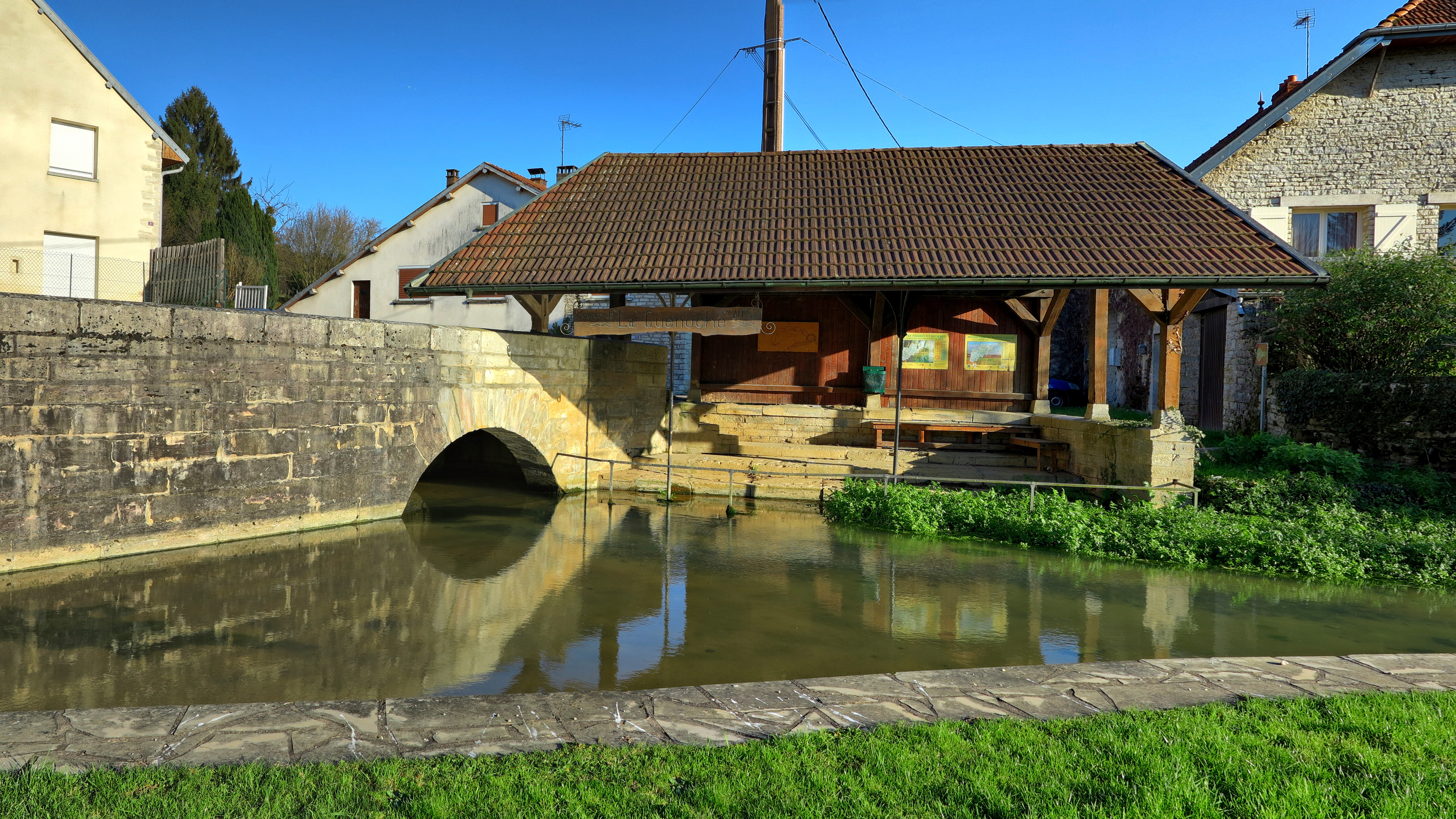
- The wash house in Quenoche
- Location of Quenoche
- Location within France Location within Bourgogne-Franche-Comté
- Coordinates: 47°28′10″N 6°06′18″E
- Country: France
- Region: Bourgogne-Franche-Comté
- Department: Haute-Saône
- Arrondissement: Vesoul
- Canton: Rioz

Government
  - Mayor (2020–2026): Yves Galland
- Area^{1}: 9.71 km^{2} (3.75 sq mi)
- Highest elevation: 380 m (1,250 ft)
- Lowest elevation: 257 m (843 ft)
- Population (2023): 231
  - Density: 23.8/km^{2} (61.6/sq mi)
- Time zone: UTC+01:00 (CET)
  - Summer (DST): UTC+02:00 (CEST)
- INSEE/Postal code: 70431 /70190
- ^{1} French Land Register data, which excludes lakes, ponds, glaciers > 1 km^{2} (0.386 sq mi or 247 acres) and river estuaries.

Quenoche (French pronunciation: [kənɔʃ]) is a commune in the Haute-Saône department in the region of Bourgogne-Franche-Comté in eastern France.

== See also ==
- Communes of the Haute-Saône department
