= Granges-le-Bourg =

- Commune
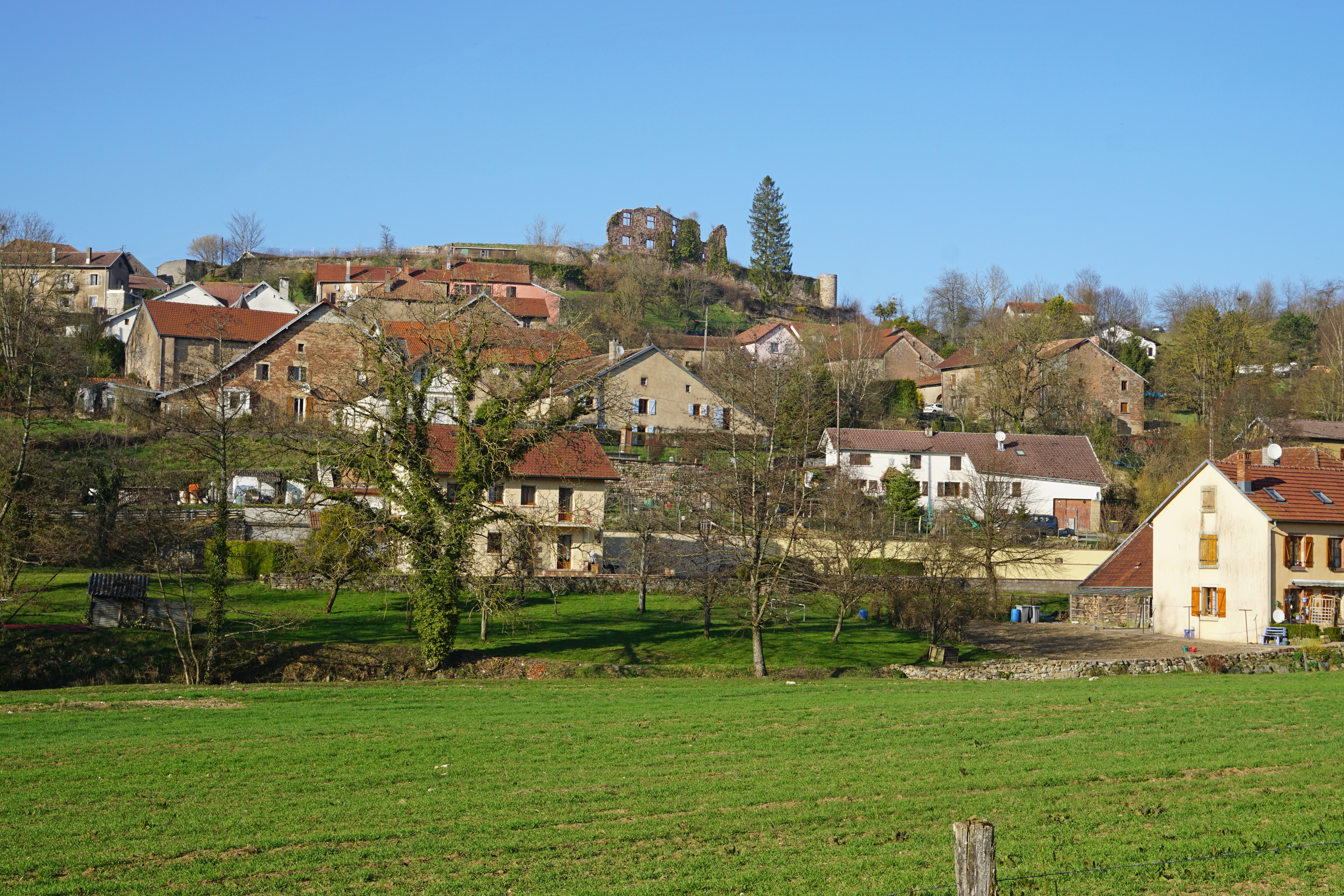
- A general view of Granges-le-Bourg

- Coat of arms
- Location of Granges-le-Bourg
- Location within France Location within Bourgogne-Franche-Comté
- Coordinates: 47°33′56″N 6°35′11″E
- Country: France
- Region: Bourgogne-Franche-Comté
- Department: Haute-Saône
- Arrondissement: Lure
- Canton: Villersexel

Government
  - Mayor (2020–2026): Claude Armbruster
- Area^{1}: 10.35 km^{2} (4.00 sq mi)
- Highest elevation: 453 m (1,486 ft)
- Lowest elevation: 290 m (950 ft)
- Population (2023): 379
  - Density: 36.6/km^{2} (94.8/sq mi)
- Time zone: UTC+01:00 (CET)
  - Summer (DST): UTC+02:00 (CEST)
- INSEE/Postal code: 70277 /70400
- ^{1} French Land Register data, which excludes lakes, ponds, glaciers > 1 km^{2} (0.386 sq mi or 247 acres) and river estuaries.

Granges-le-Bourg (French pronunciation: [ɡʁɑ̃ʒ lə buʁ]) is a commune in the Haute-Saône department in the region of Bourgogne-Franche-Comté in eastern France.

== Population ==
Historical population

Year	Pop.	±% p.a.
1793	344	—
1831	442	+0.66%
1851	567	+1.25%
1872	400	−1.65%
1901	311	−0.86%
1911	251	−2.12%
1921	184	−3.06%
1936	275	+2.72%
1946	174	−4.47%
1954	297	+6.91%

Year	Pop.	±% p.a.
1962	315	+0.74%
1968	287	−1.54%
1975	356	+3.13%
1982	330	−1.08%
1990	306	−0.94%
1999	313	+0.25%
2007	357	+1.66%
2012	383	+1.42%
2017	387	+0.21%
2023	379	−0.35%

Source: EHESS and INSEE (1968-2023)

== See also ==
- Communes of the Haute-Saône department
