= Étobon =

- Commune
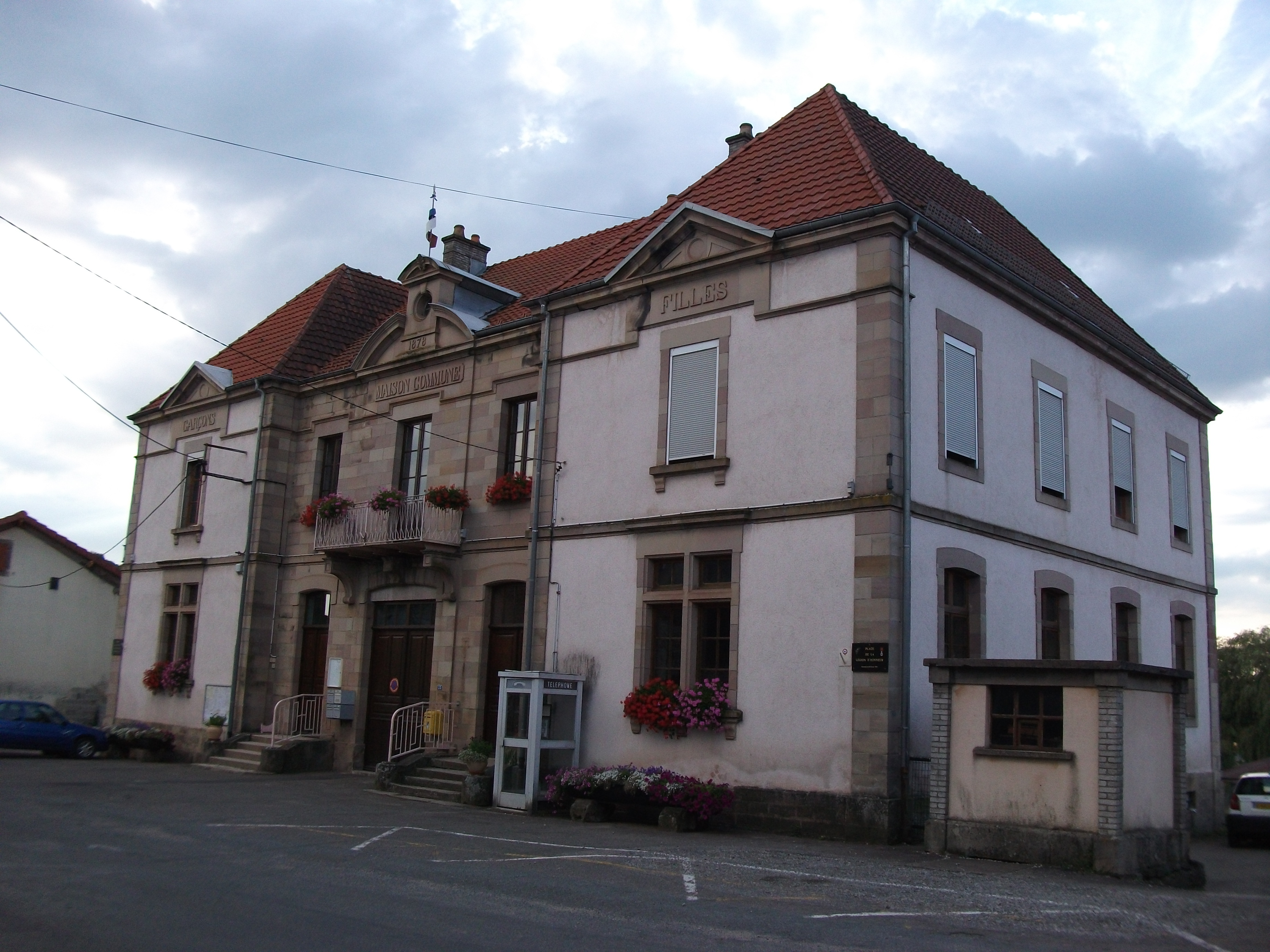
- The town hall in Étobon

- Coat of arms
- Location of Étobon
- Location within France Location within Bourgogne-Franche-Comté
- Coordinates: 47°38′38″N 6°40′37″E
- Country: France
- Region: Bourgogne-Franche-Comté
- Department: Haute-Saône
- Arrondissement: Lure
- Canton: Héricourt-2
- Intercommunality: CC pays d'Héricourt

Government
  - Mayor (2023–2026): André-François Louis
- Area^{1}: 12.26 km^{2} (4.73 sq mi)
- Highest elevation: 585 m (1,919 ft)
- Lowest elevation: 343 m (1,125 ft)
- Population (2023): 273
  - Density: 22.3/km^{2} (57.7/sq mi)
- Time zone: UTC+01:00 (CET)
  - Summer (DST): UTC+02:00 (CEST)
- INSEE/Postal code: 70221 /70400
- ^{1} French Land Register data, which excludes lakes, ponds, glaciers > 1 km^{2} (0.386 sq mi or 247 acres) and river estuaries.

Étobon (French pronunciation: [etɔbɔ̃]) is a commune in the Haute-Saône department in the region of Bourgogne-Franche-Comté in eastern France.

== History ==
=== Crash of 1933 ===
On this last day of October, the pilot Gaston Lafannechère was assisted by the mechanic Bloquet and the radio operator Camille Suply. The plane of the Air France company, which had hardly more than 1,500 flight hours, was, it seems, heavily loaded on departure from Basel. While it only carried two passengers in the comfortable cabin with eight adjustable back seats, heavy packages had been loaded, apparently not very securely stowed. According to Henri Colin, whose father was a P.T.T. In Lure at the time, L'Etoile d'Argent also carried mail bags that his father urgently took by taxi after the accident, for delivery by the normal route. Finally, the plane was still carrying five boxes containing 239 kg of gold (i.e. 4,302,000 francs at the time) and four chamois that the Basel Zoological Garden sent to London (one injured was completed on site, the others fled).

Regarding the general meteorological situation that reigned that day, it seems that the Paris region was well cleared which made the end of the trip safe. On the other hand, the east of France had to be covered, as often happens at this time of the year, with a thick layer of fog. Finally, let's not forget the altitude of Etobon Hill which is 575 meters. Knowing all these data, one can imagine the large three-engined aircraft rising with difficulty in the freezing fog, not managing to get out of the opaque layer, its ascending capacities gradually disappearing, and worse, the propellers probably transformed into "sleeves of pickaxe "as the experienced pilots say, getting carried away without dragging the plane which finally collapses into the trees ... In the accident of October 31, 1933, two occupants of the cabin were killed: the radio Camille Suply and a passenger, Dr. Werner Spoeri (pharmacist in Einsideln in Switzerland writes Michel Bregnard).

=== Second World War ===
The village of Étobon has been a transit point for a large number of Indian prisoners of war who, after taking advantage of the Allied bombing of their camp on the heights of Épinal on 11 May 1944 to escape, sought to reach the Swiss border in the Porrentruy region. 500 Indian prisoners of war managed to find refuge in Switzerland, making this the largest prisoner of war escape of the entire Second World War. This episode is narrated in the book ‘The Great Épinal Escape’ by British historian Ghee Bowman. Jules Perret, the blacksmith of Étobon, is mentioned several times in this book for his assistance to fugitives who crossed the commune's boundaries. Unfortunately, his son was among those shot in September 1944.

On 27 September 1944, 39 men from Étobon were shot by German troops from the 30th Waffen Grenadier Division of the SS against the Protestant temple of Chenebier, a village near Etobon, and 27 others taken prisoner in retaliation for the death of a German general killed on 9 September by the French Resistance in the nearby forest between Belverne and Lyoffans. The town received the Croix de Guerre 1939-1945 after the Second World War and the Legion of Honour in 1949.

== See also ==
- Communes of the Haute-Saône department
