= Vyans-le-Val =

- Commune
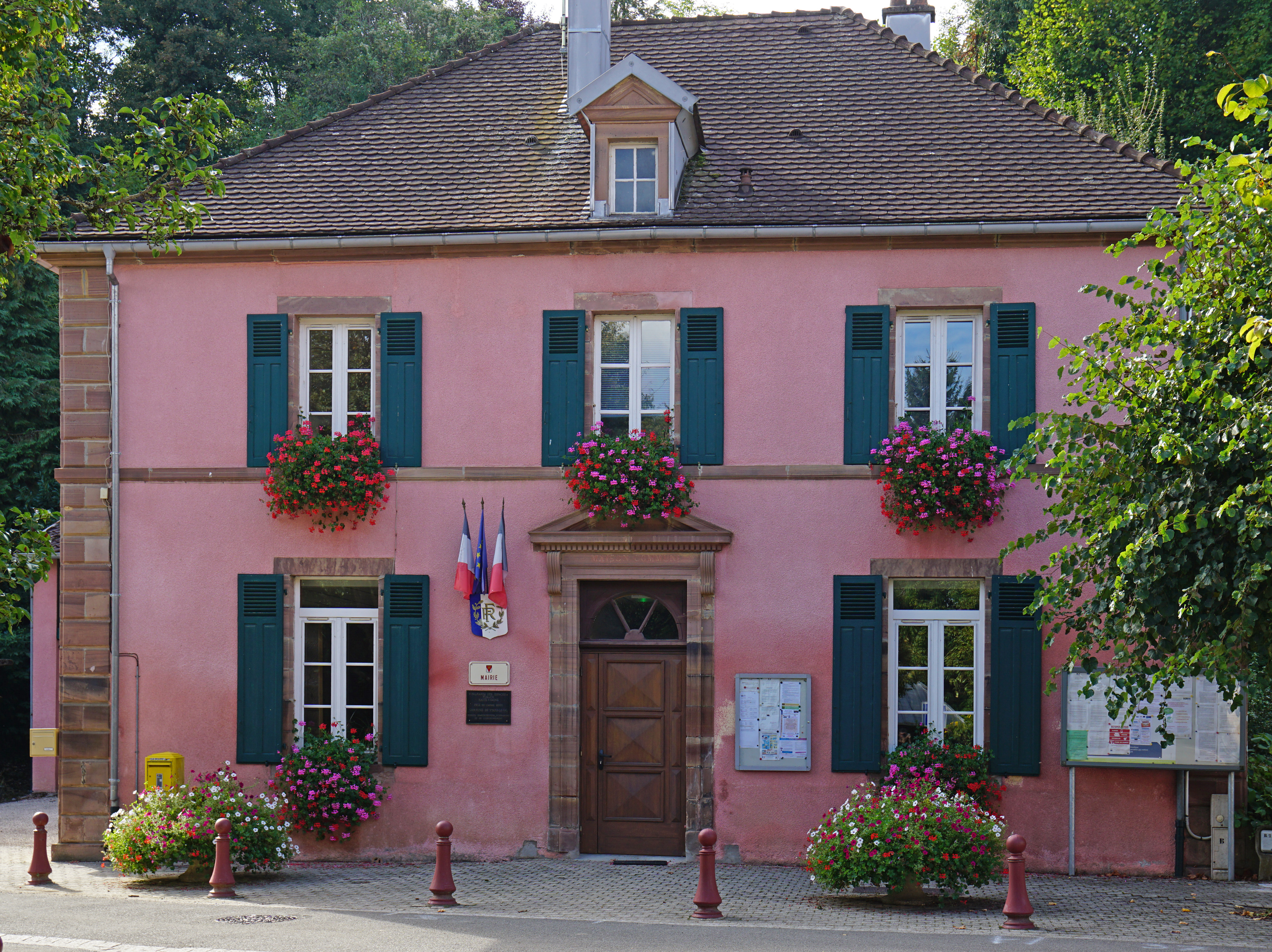
- The town hall in Vyans-le-Val

- Coat of arms
- Location of Vyans-le-Val
- Location within France Location within Bourgogne-Franche-Comté
- Coordinates: 47°33′03″N 6°46′05″E
- Country: France
- Region: Bourgogne-Franche-Comté
- Department: Haute-Saône
- Arrondissement: Lure
- Canton: Héricourt-2
- Intercommunality: Pays d'Héricourt

Government
  - Mayor (2020–2026): Yves Ligier
- Area^{1}: 3.32 km^{2} (1.28 sq mi)
- Highest elevation: 463 m (1,519 ft)
- Lowest elevation: 339 m (1,112 ft)
- Population (2023): 420
  - Density: 130/km^{2} (330/sq mi)
- Time zone: UTC+01:00 (CET)
  - Summer (DST): UTC+02:00 (CEST)
- INSEE/Postal code: 70579 /70400
- ^{1} French Land Register data, which excludes lakes, ponds, glaciers > 1 km^{2} (0.386 sq mi or 247 acres) and river estuaries.

Vyans-le-Val (French pronunciation: [vjɑ̃ lə val]) is a commune in the Haute-Saône department in the region of Bourgogne-Franche-Comté in eastern France.

It is located on a tributary of the river Lizaine, five km south of Hericourt and two km west of Bussurel, close to the Haute-Saône / Doubs border.

The village church is a Lutheran Protestant church, part of the United Protestant Church of France.

== Population ==
Historical population
Year	Pop.	±% p.a.
1968	239	—
1975	311	+3.83%
1982	384	+3.06%
1990	400	+0.51%
1999	419	+0.52%
2007	438	+0.56%
2012	423	−0.69%
2017	453	+1.38%
2023	420	−1.25%
Source: INSEE

== See also ==
- Communes of the Haute-Saône department
