= Dormoy =

Dormoy (French pronunciation: [dɔʁmwa]) is a French surname. Notable people with the surname include:

- Pierre Jacques Dormoy (1825–1892), French Protestant engineer and inventor
- Étienne Dormoy (1885–1959), French aeronautical engineer and aircraft designer
- Marx Dormoy (1888–1941), French socialist politician.
- Marcelle Dormoy (1895–1976), French fashion designer active 1910s to 1950

== See also ==
- Dormoy Bathtub, a racing aeroplane invented by Etienne Dormoy in the 1920s
- Marx Dormoy (Paris Métro), a station of the Paris Métro named after the politician
