= Tavey =

- Part of Héricourt
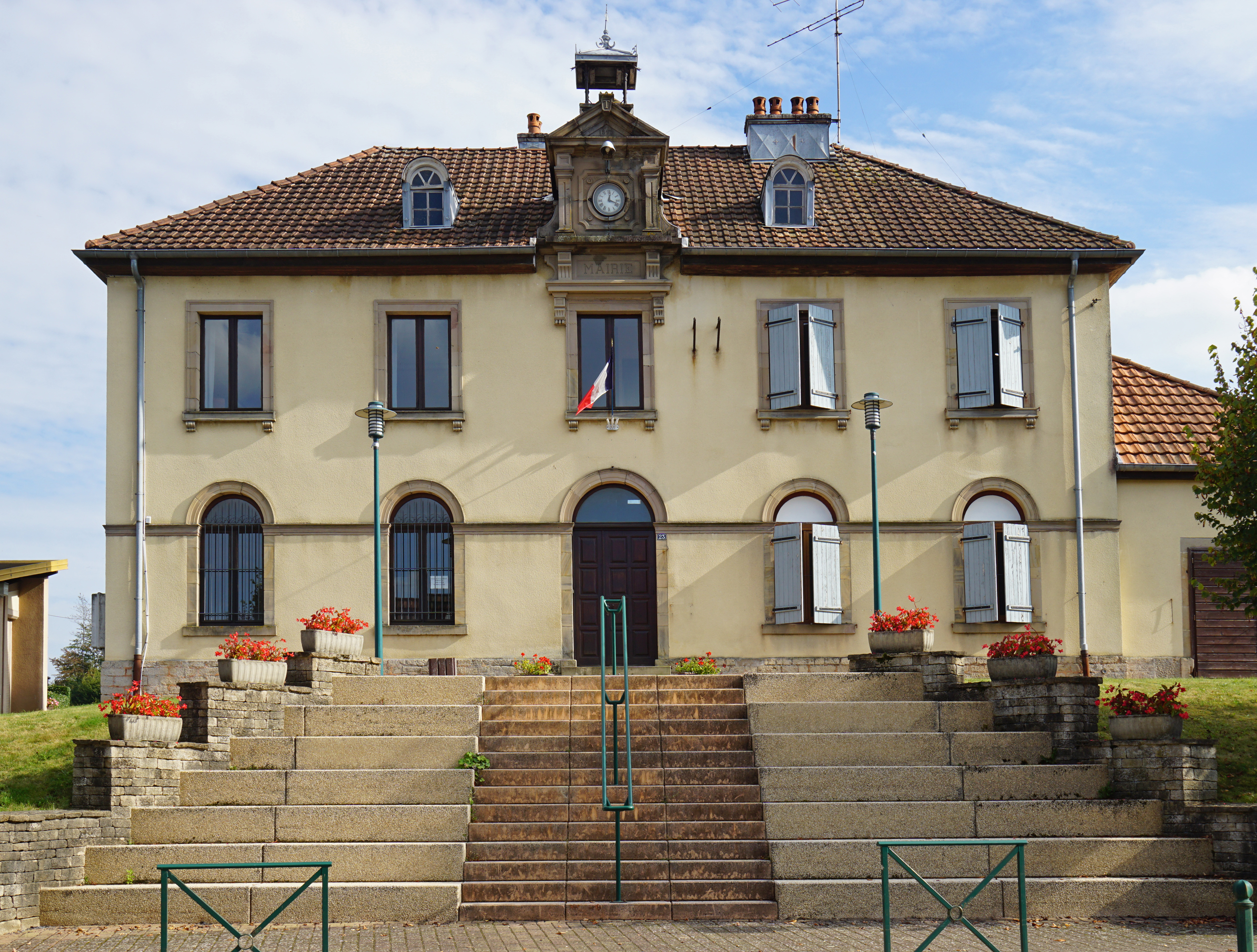
- The town hall in Tavey

- Coat of arms
- Location of Tavey
- Location within France Location within Bourgogne-Franche-Comté
- Coordinates: 47°34′01″N 6°44′36″E
- Country: France
- Region: Bourgogne-Franche-Comté
- Department: Haute-Saône
- Arrondissement: Lure
- Canton: Héricourt-2
- Commune: Héricourt
- Area^{1}: 2.96 km^{2} (1.14 sq mi)
- Highest elevation: 448 m (1,470 ft)
- Lowest elevation: 336 m (1,102 ft)
- Population (2022): 507
  - Density: 171/km^{2} (444/sq mi)
- Time zone: UTC+01:00 (CET)
  - Summer (DST): UTC+02:00 (CEST)
- Postal code: 70400
- ^{1} French Land Register data, which excludes lakes, ponds, glaciers > 1 km^{2} (0.386 sq mi or 247 acres) and river estuaries.

Tavey (French pronunciation: [tavɛ]) is a former commune in the Haute-Saône department in the region of Bourgogne-Franche-Comté in eastern France. On 1 January 2019, it was merged into the commune Héricourt.

== See also ==
- Communes of the Haute-Saône department
