= Communauté de communes du pays d'Héricourt =

Federation of municipalities in France

Portes de la Creuse en Marche
- Communauté de communes
- Interactive map of Portes de la Creuse en Marche
- Coordinates: 47°35′N 06°43′E
- Country: France
- Region: Bourgogne-Franche-Comté
- Department: Doubs, Haute-Saône
- No. of communes: {{{nbcomm}}}
- Established: 2000
- Area: 163.6 km^{2} (63.2 sq mi)
- Population (2019): 21,078
  - Density: 128.8/km^{2} (333.7/sq mi)
- Website: www.cc-pays-hericourt.fr

The Communauté de communes du pays d'Héricourt is a communauté de communes, an intercommunal structure, in the Haute-Saône and Doubs departments, in the Bourgogne-Franche-Comté region of France. Since January 2019, it consists of 23 communes. It has its administrative offices at Héricourt. Its area is 163.6 km^{2}, and its population was 21,078 in 2019.

== Presidents ==
- Jean-Michel Villaumé, from 2000 to 2007.
- Fernand Burkhalter, since 2007, re-elected in 2014 and 2020.

== Composition ==
The communauté de communes consists of the following 23 communes, of which three (Aibre, Laire and Le Vernoy) in the Doubs department:

1. Aibre
2. Belverne
3. Brevilliers
4. Chagey
5. Châlonvillars
6. Champey
7. Chavanne
8. Chenebier
9. Coisevaux
10. Courmont
11. Couthenans
12. Échenans-sous-Mont-Vaudois
13. Étobon
14. Héricourt
15. Laire
16. Luze
17. Mandrevillars
18. Saulnot
19. Trémoins
20. Verlans
21. Le Vernoy
22. Villers-sur-Saulnot
23. Vyans-le-Val
