= Courmont, Haute-Saône =

Courmont
- Commune
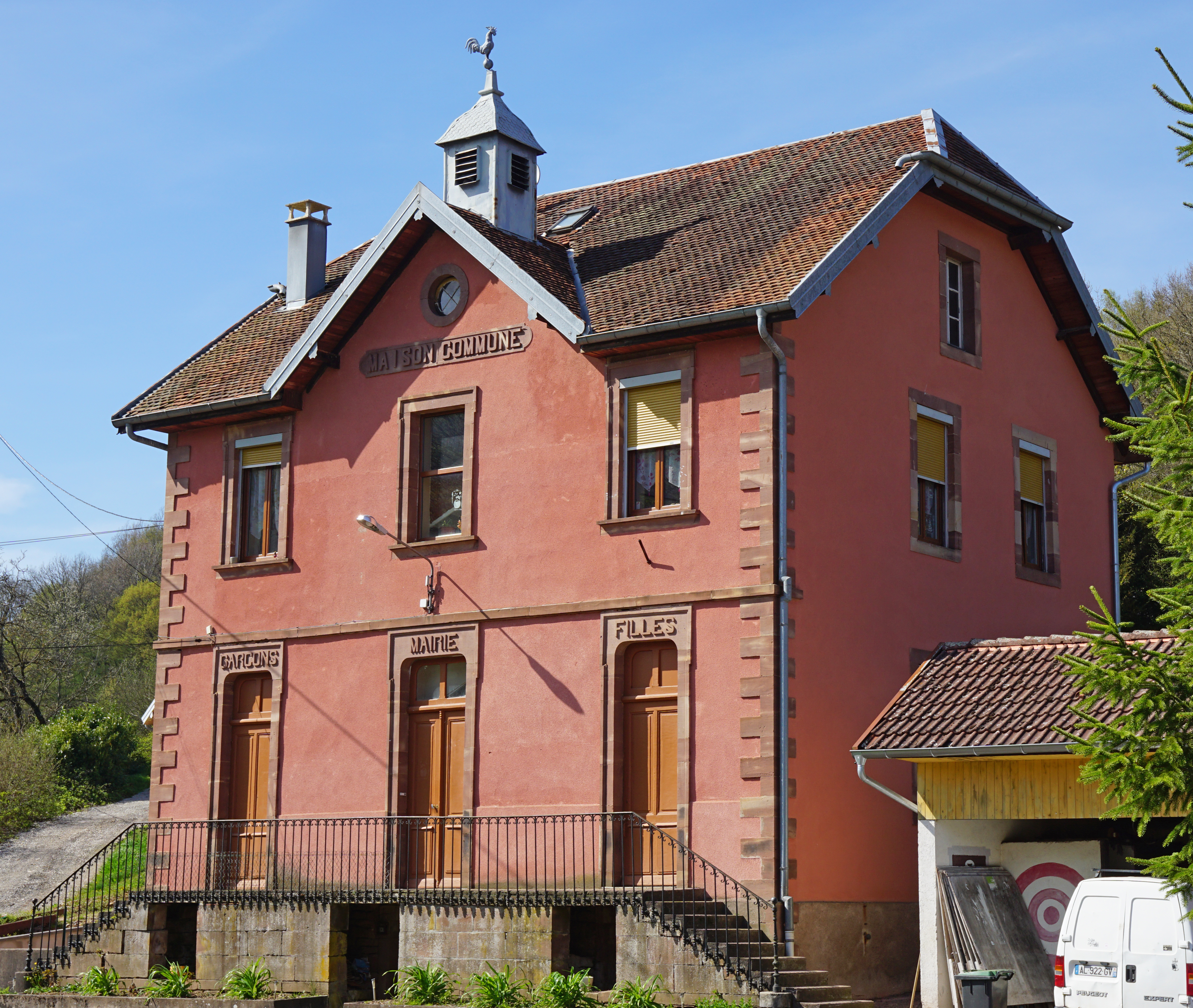
- The town hall in Courmont

- Coat of arms
- Location of Courmont
- Location within France Location within Bourgogne-Franche-Comté
- Coordinates: 47°36′45″N 6°37′41″E
- Country: France
- Region: Bourgogne-Franche-Comté
- Department: Haute-Saône
- Arrondissement: Lure
- Canton: Héricourt-2
- Intercommunality: CC pays d'Héricourt

Government
  - Mayor (2020–2026): Hugues Villani
- Area^{1}: 6.39 km^{2} (2.47 sq mi)
- Highest elevation: 547 m (1,795 ft)
- Lowest elevation: 320 m (1,050 ft)
- Population (2023): 119
  - Density: 18.6/km^{2} (48.2/sq mi)
- Time zone: UTC+01:00 (CET)
  - Summer (DST): UTC+02:00 (CEST)
- INSEE/Postal code: 70182 /70400
- ^{1} French Land Register data, which excludes lakes, ponds, glaciers > 1 km^{2} (0.386 sq mi or 247 acres) and river estuaries.

Courmont (French pronunciation: [kuʁmɔ̃]) is a commune in the Haute-Saône department in the region of Bourgogne-Franche-Comté in eastern France. As of 2023, the population of the commune was 119.

== See also ==
- Communes of the Haute-Saône department
