= Villers-sur-Saulnot =

- Commune
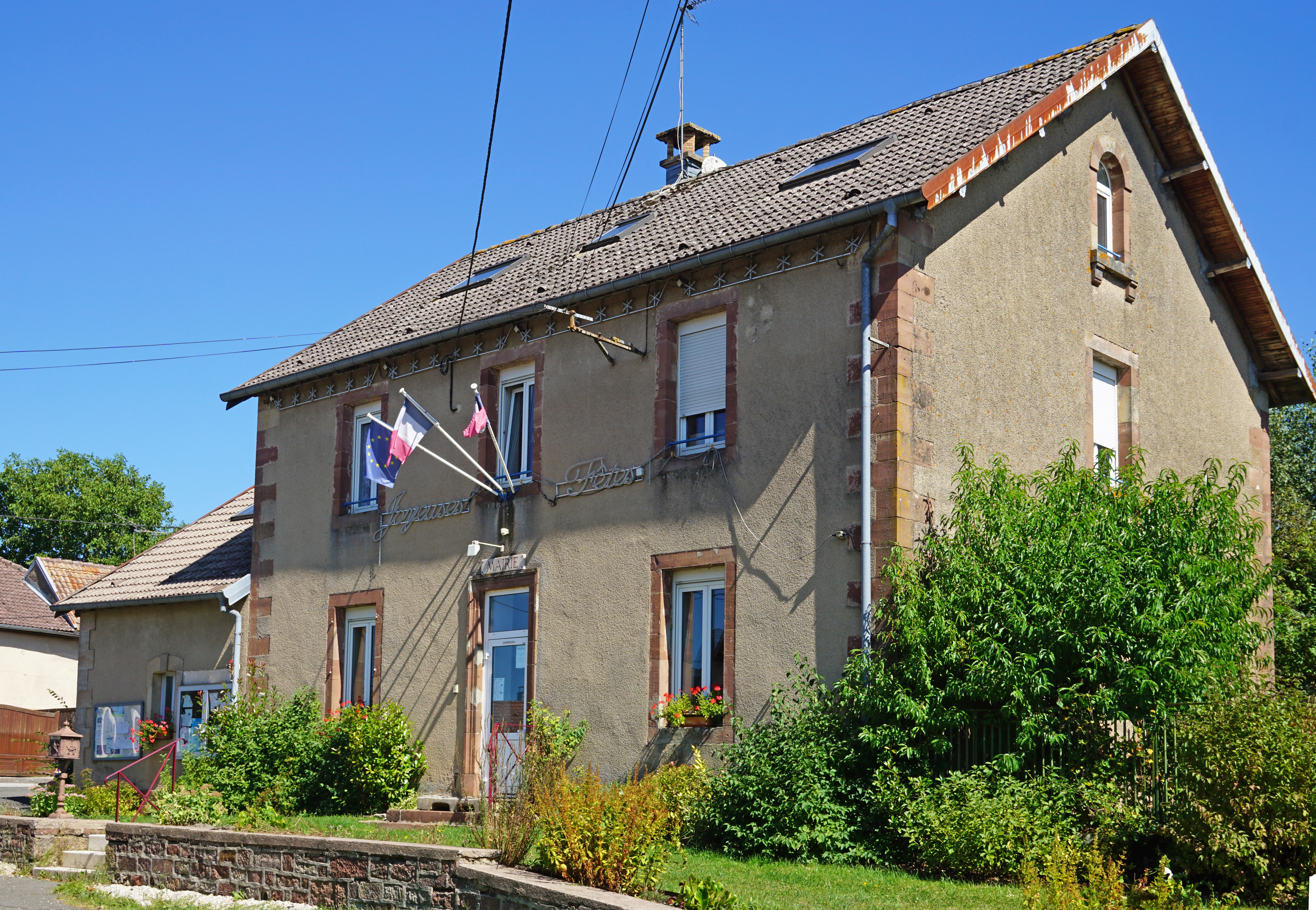
- The town hall in Villers-sur-Saulnot
- Location of Villers-sur-Saulnot
- Location within France Location within Bourgogne-Franche-Comté
- Coordinates: 47°33′00″N 6°38′53″E
- Country: France
- Region: Bourgogne-Franche-Comté
- Department: Haute-Saône
- Arrondissement: Lure
- Canton: Héricourt-2
- Intercommunality: CC pays d'Héricourt
- Area^{1}: 2.37 km^{2} (0.92 sq mi)
- Highest elevation: 500 m (1,600 ft)
- Lowest elevation: 365 m (1,198 ft)
- Population (2023): 124
  - Density: 52.3/km^{2} (136/sq mi)
- Time zone: UTC+01:00 (CET)
  - Summer (DST): UTC+02:00 (CEST)
- INSEE/Postal code: 70567 /70400
- ^{1} French Land Register data, which excludes lakes, ponds, glaciers > 1 km^{2} (0.386 sq mi or 247 acres) and river estuaries.

Villers-sur-Saulnot is a commune in the Haute-Saône department in the region of Bourgogne-Franche-Comté in eastern France.

== See also ==
- Communes of the Haute-Saône department
