= Châlonvillars =

- Commune
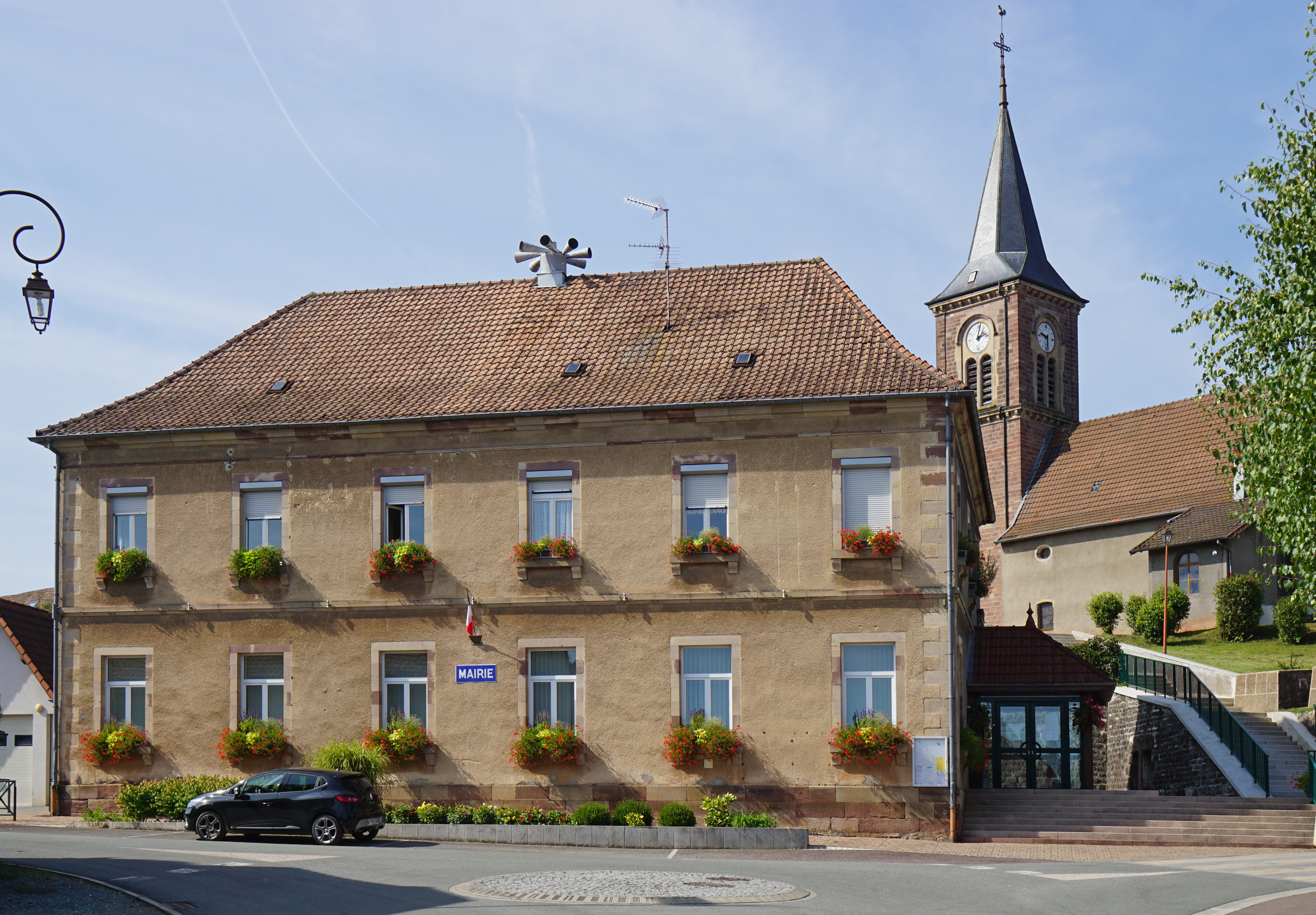
- The town hall in Châlonvillars

- Coat of arms
- Location of Châlonvillars
- Location within France Location within Bourgogne-Franche-Comté
- Coordinates: 47°38′23″N 6°47′13″E
- Country: France
- Region: Bourgogne-Franche-Comté
- Department: Haute-Saône
- Arrondissement: Lure
- Canton: Héricourt-1
- Intercommunality: CC pays d'Héricourt

Government
  - Mayor (2020–2026): Jean-Claude Kubler
- Area^{1}: 7.60 km^{2} (2.93 sq mi)
- Highest elevation: 493 m (1,617 ft)
- Lowest elevation: 363 m (1,191 ft)
- Population (2023): 1,264
  - Density: 166/km^{2} (431/sq mi)
- Time zone: UTC+01:00 (CET)
  - Summer (DST): UTC+02:00 (CEST)
- INSEE/Postal code: 70117 /70400
- ^{1} French Land Register data, which excludes lakes, ponds, glaciers > 1 km^{2} (0.386 sq mi or 247 acres) and river estuaries.

Châlonvillars (French pronunciation: [ʃalɔ̃vilaʁ]) is a commune in the Haute-Saône department in the region of Bourgogne-Franche-Comté in eastern France. Between 1973 and 1989, it was united with Mandrevillars in the commune Châlonvillars-Mandrevillars.

== See also ==
- Communes of the Haute-Saône department
