= Aibre =

- Commune
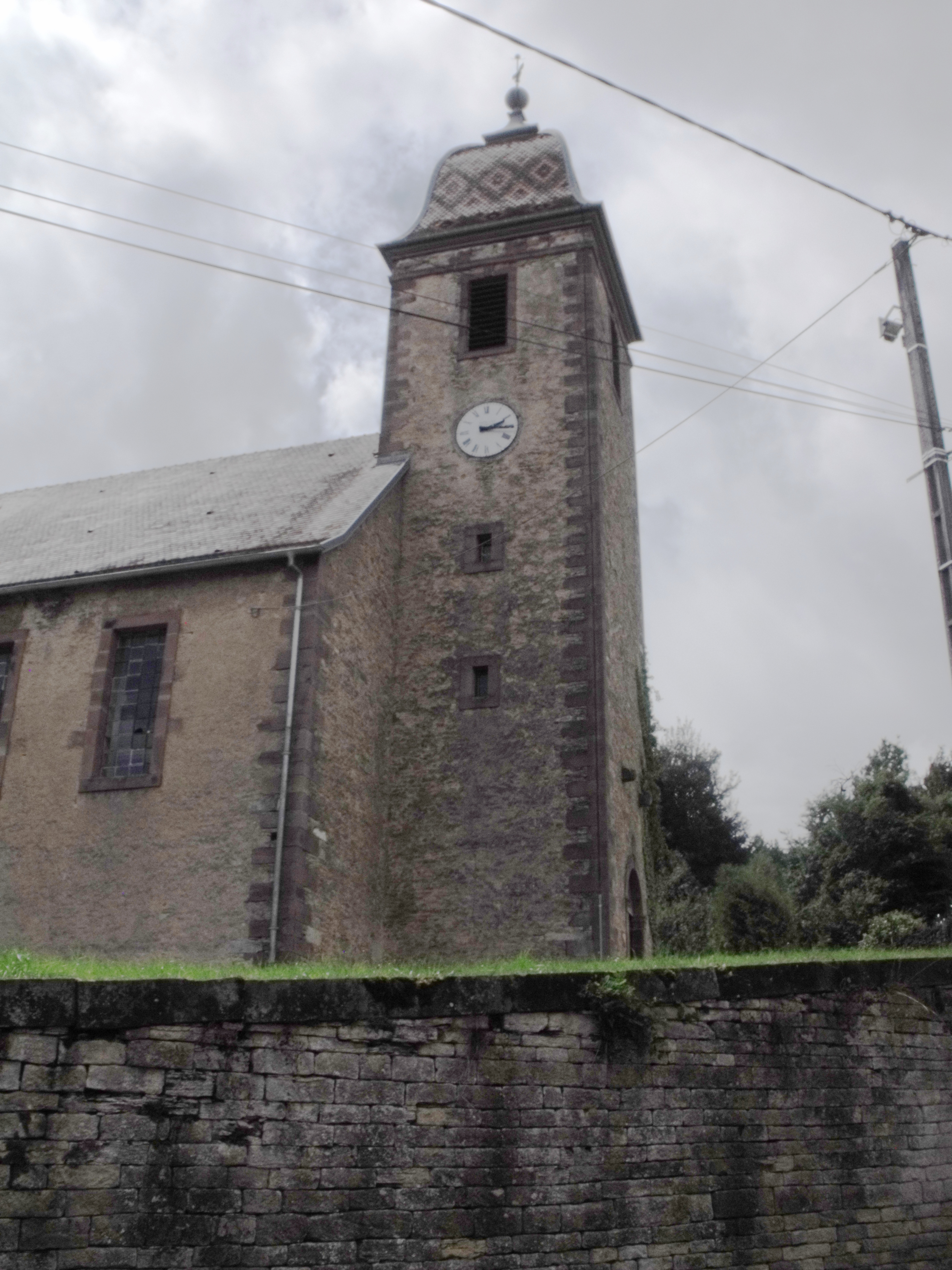
- The temple in Aibre

- Coat of arms
- Location of Aibre
- Location within France Location within Bourgogne-Franche-Comté
- Coordinates: 47°33′07″N 6°41′51″E
- Country: France
- Region: Bourgogne-Franche-Comté
- Department: Doubs
- Arrondissement: Montbéliard
- Canton: Bavans
- Intercommunality: Pays d'Héricourt

Government
  - Mayor (2020–2026): Pascal Boulade
- Area^{1}: 4.5 km^{2} (1.7 sq mi)
- Highest elevation: 473 m (1,552 ft)
- Lowest elevation: 348 m (1,142 ft)
- Population (2023): 434
  - Density: 96/km^{2} (250/sq mi)
- Time zone: UTC+01:00 (CET)
  - Summer (DST): UTC+02:00 (CEST)
- INSEE/Postal code: 25008 /25750
- ^{1} French Land Register data, which excludes lakes, ponds, glaciers > 1 km^{2} (0.386 sq mi or 247 acres) and river estuaries.

Aibre (French pronunciation: [ɛbʁ]) is a commune in the Doubs department in the Bourgogne-Franche-Comté region in eastern France.

== Population ==
Historical population
Year	Pop.	±% p.a.
1968	221	—
1975	258	+2.24%
1982	522	+10.59%
1990	504	−0.44%
1999	455	−1.13%
2007	456	+0.03%
2012	466	+0.43%
2017	473	+0.30%
2023	434	−1.42%
Source: INSEE

== See also ==
- Communes of the Doubs department
