= Mandrevillars =

- Commune
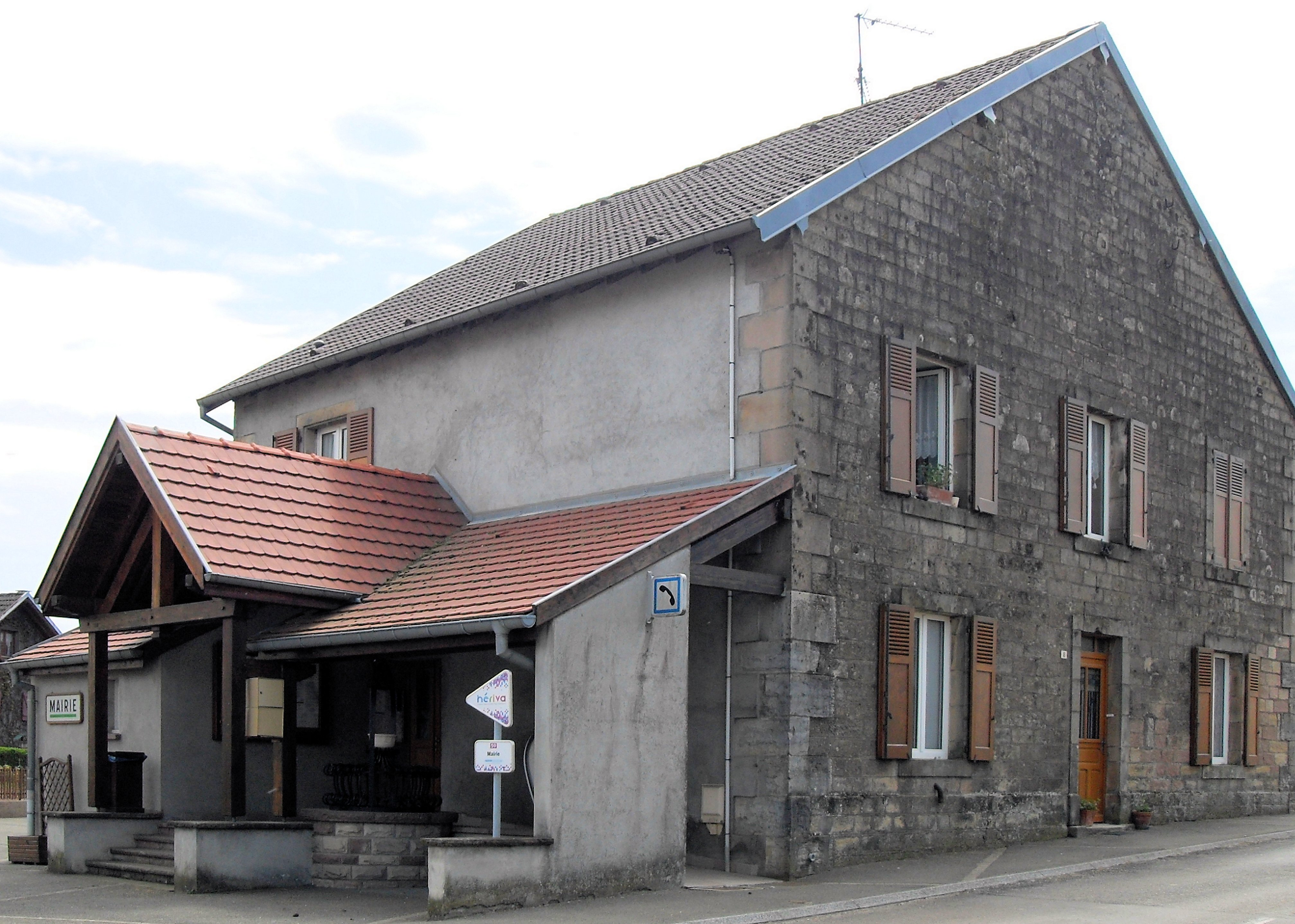
- The town hall in Mandrevillars

- Coat of arms
- Location of Mandrevillars
- Location within France Location within Bourgogne-Franche-Comté
- Coordinates: 47°36′50″N 6°46′43″E
- Country: France
- Region: Bourgogne-Franche-Comté
- Department: Haute-Saône
- Arrondissement: Lure
- Canton: Héricourt-1
- Intercommunality: CC pays d'Héricourt
- Area^{1}: 3.03 km^{2} (1.17 sq mi)
- Highest elevation: 443 m (1,453 ft)
- Lowest elevation: 360 m (1,180 ft)
- Population (2023): 344
  - Density: 114/km^{2} (294/sq mi)
- Time zone: UTC+01:00 (CET)
  - Summer (DST): UTC+02:00 (CEST)
- INSEE/Postal code: 70330 /70400
- ^{1} French Land Register data, which excludes lakes, ponds, glaciers > 1 km^{2} (0.386 sq mi or 247 acres) and river estuaries.

Mandrevillars is a commune in the Haute-Saône department in the region of Bourgogne-Franche-Comté in eastern France. Between 1973 and 1989, it was united with Châlonvillars in the commune Châlonvillars-Mandrevillars.

== See also ==
- Communes of the Haute-Saône department
