= Laire =

- Commune
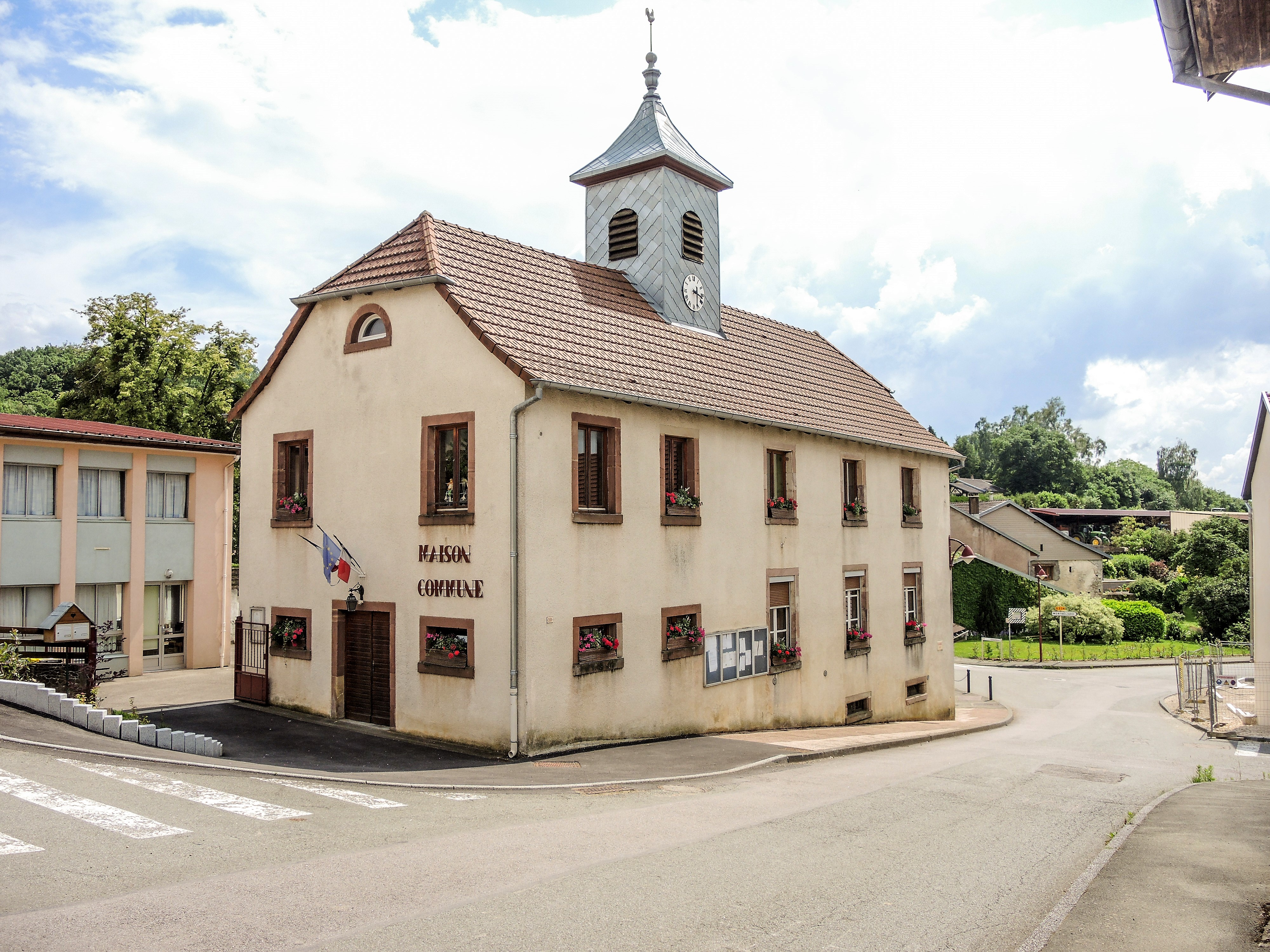
- The town hall in Laire

- Coat of arms
- Location of Laire
- Location within France Location within Bourgogne-Franche-Comté
- Coordinates: 47°33′05″N 6°44′00″E
- Country: France
- Region: Bourgogne-Franche-Comté
- Department: Doubs
- Arrondissement: Montbéliard
- Canton: Bavans
- Intercommunality: CC pays d'Héricourt

Government
  - Mayor (2020–2026): André-Marie Depoutot
- Area^{1}: 3.17 km^{2} (1.22 sq mi)
- Highest elevation: 462 m (1,516 ft)
- Lowest elevation: 356 m (1,168 ft)
- Population (2023): 405
  - Density: 128/km^{2} (331/sq mi)
- Time zone: UTC+01:00 (CET)
  - Summer (DST): UTC+02:00 (CEST)
- INSEE/Postal code: 25322 /25550
- ^{1} French Land Register data, which excludes lakes, ponds, glaciers > 1 km^{2} (0.386 sq mi or 247 acres) and river estuaries.

Laire (French pronunciation: [lɛʁ]) is a commune in the Doubs department in the Bourgogne-Franche-Comté region in eastern France.

== Geography ==
The commune is located 10 km (6.2 mi) from Montbéliard.

== History ==
The name of the commune was originally spelled Layr and appears for the first time in 1231 in a charter of Thierry (Theodoric) III, Count of Montbéliard

== Population ==
Historical population
| Year | Pop. | ±% p.a. |
|---|---|---|
| 1968 | 119 | — |
| 1975 | 175 | +5.66% |
| 1982 | 271 | +6.45% |
| 1990 | 243 | −1.35% |
| 1999 | 314 | +2.89% |
| 2007 | 389 | +2.71% |
| 2012 | 388 | −0.05% |
| 2017 | 400 | +0.61% |
| 2023 | 405 | +0.21% |
Source: INSEE

The inhabitants of Laire are called Niauds in French.

== Trivia ==
- Laire is a live action role playing game ("LAIRE" - Live Action Interactive Role-playing Explorers) located in Sparta, New Jersey, USA. The name is featured in the movie Role Models. France has its own history in medieval history and lore.

== See also ==
- Communes of the Doubs department
