= Couthenans =

- Commune
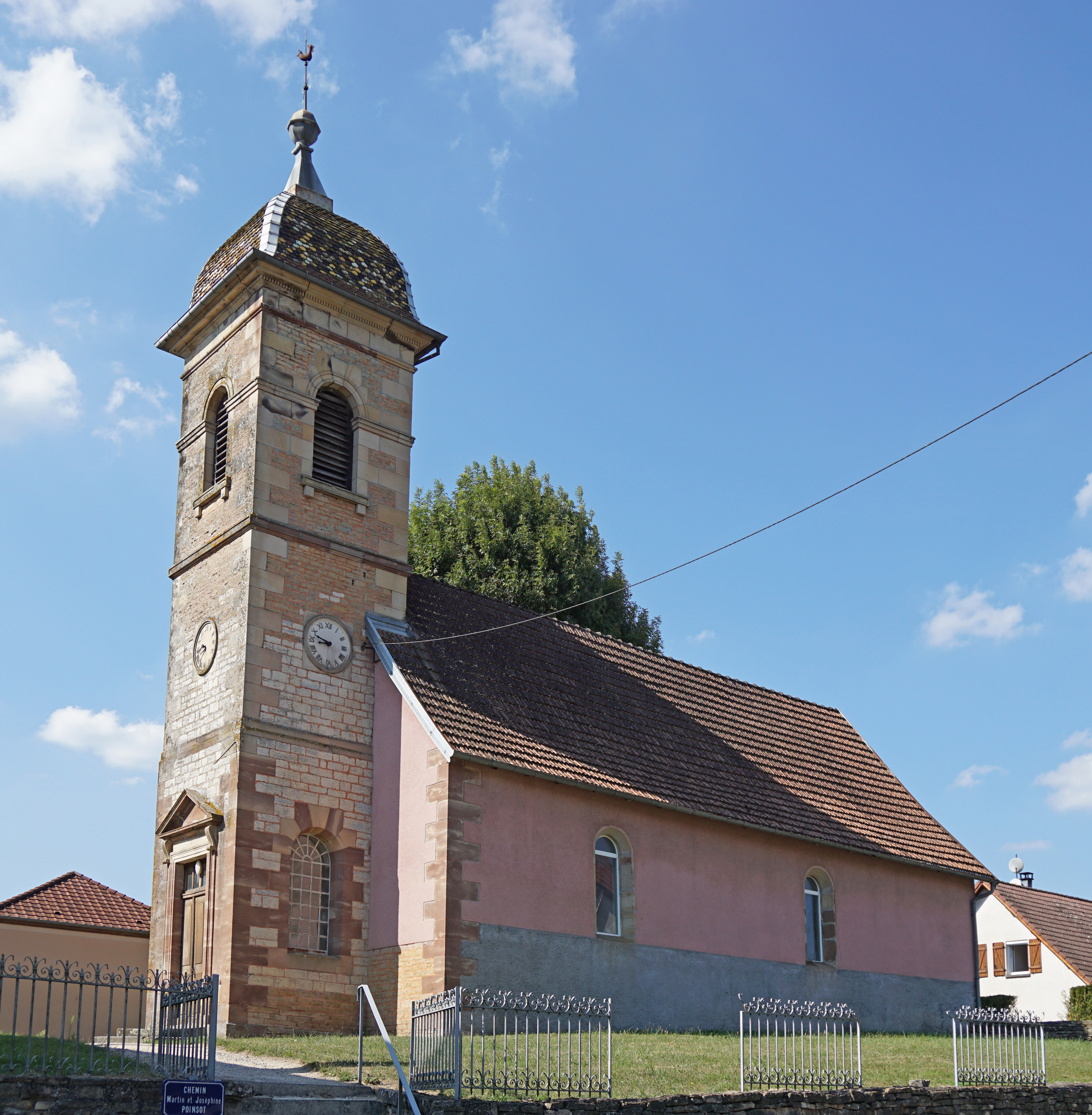
- The church in Couthenans
- Location of Couthenans
- Location within France Location within Bourgogne-Franche-Comté
- Coordinates: 47°35′29″N 6°43′34″E
- Country: France
- Region: Bourgogne-Franche-Comté
- Department: Haute-Saône
- Arrondissement: Lure
- Canton: Héricourt-2
- Intercommunality: CC pays d'Héricourt

Government
  - Mayor (2020–2026): Jean-Pierre Jeanroy
- Area^{1}: 1.64 km^{2} (0.63 sq mi)
- Highest elevation: 480 m (1,570 ft)
- Lowest elevation: 331 m (1,086 ft)
- Population (2023): 716
  - Density: 437/km^{2} (1,130/sq mi)
- Time zone: UTC+01:00 (CET)
  - Summer (DST): UTC+02:00 (CEST)
- INSEE/Postal code: 70184 /70400
- ^{1} French Land Register data, which excludes lakes, ponds, glaciers > 1 km^{2} (0.386 sq mi or 247 acres) and river estuaries.

Couthenans (French pronunciation: [kutnɑ̃]) is a commune in the Haute-Saône department in the region of Bourgogne-Franche-Comté in eastern France.

== People ==
Couthenans is the birthplace of:

- Pierre Jacques Dormoy (1825 - 1892) a Protestant engineer, inventor, industry captain, the creator of the Dormoy foundries as well as a political and economic personality in Bordeaux.

== See also ==
- Communes of the Haute-Saône department
