= Chavanne =

- Commune
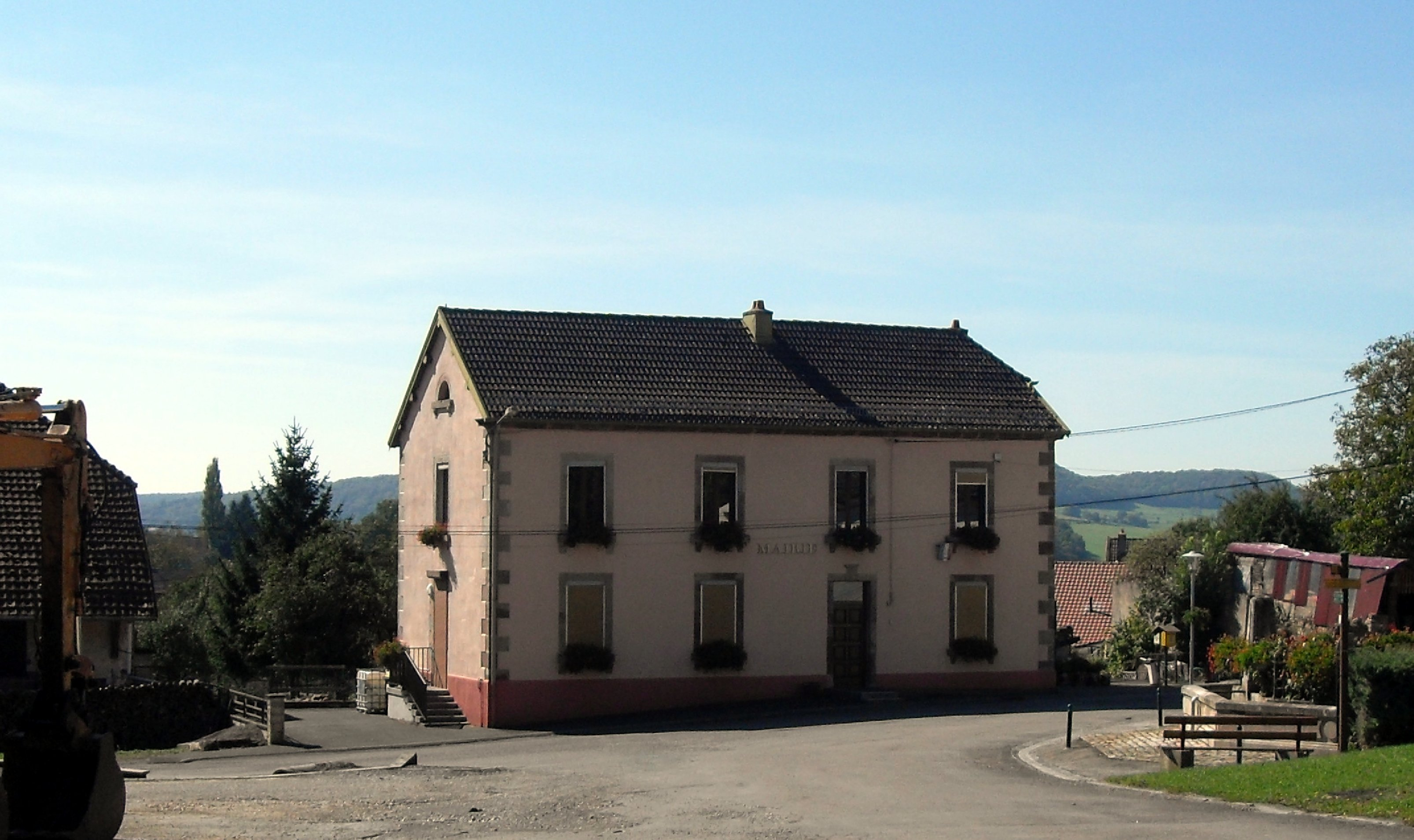
- The town hall in Chavanne
- Location of Chavanne
- Location within France Location within Bourgogne-Franche-Comté
- Coordinates: 47°33′31″N 6°39′30″E
- Country: France
- Region: Bourgogne-Franche-Comté
- Department: Haute-Saône
- Arrondissement: Lure
- Canton: Héricourt-2
- Intercommunality: CC pays d'Héricourt

Government
  - Mayor (2020–2026): Jean-Pierre Mathey
- Area^{1}: 2.32 km^{2} (0.90 sq mi)
- Highest elevation: 512 m (1,680 ft)
- Lowest elevation: 373 m (1,224 ft)
- Population (2023): 213
  - Density: 91.8/km^{2} (238/sq mi)
- Time zone: UTC+01:00 (CET)
  - Summer (DST): UTC+02:00 (CEST)
- INSEE/Postal code: 70147 /70400
- ^{1} French Land Register data, which excludes lakes, ponds, glaciers > 1 km^{2} (0.386 sq mi or 247 acres) and river estuaries.

Chavanne (French pronunciation: [ʃavan]) is a commune in the Haute-Saône department in the region of Bourgogne-Franche-Comté in eastern France.

== See also ==
- Communes of the Haute-Saône department
