= Verlans =

- Commune
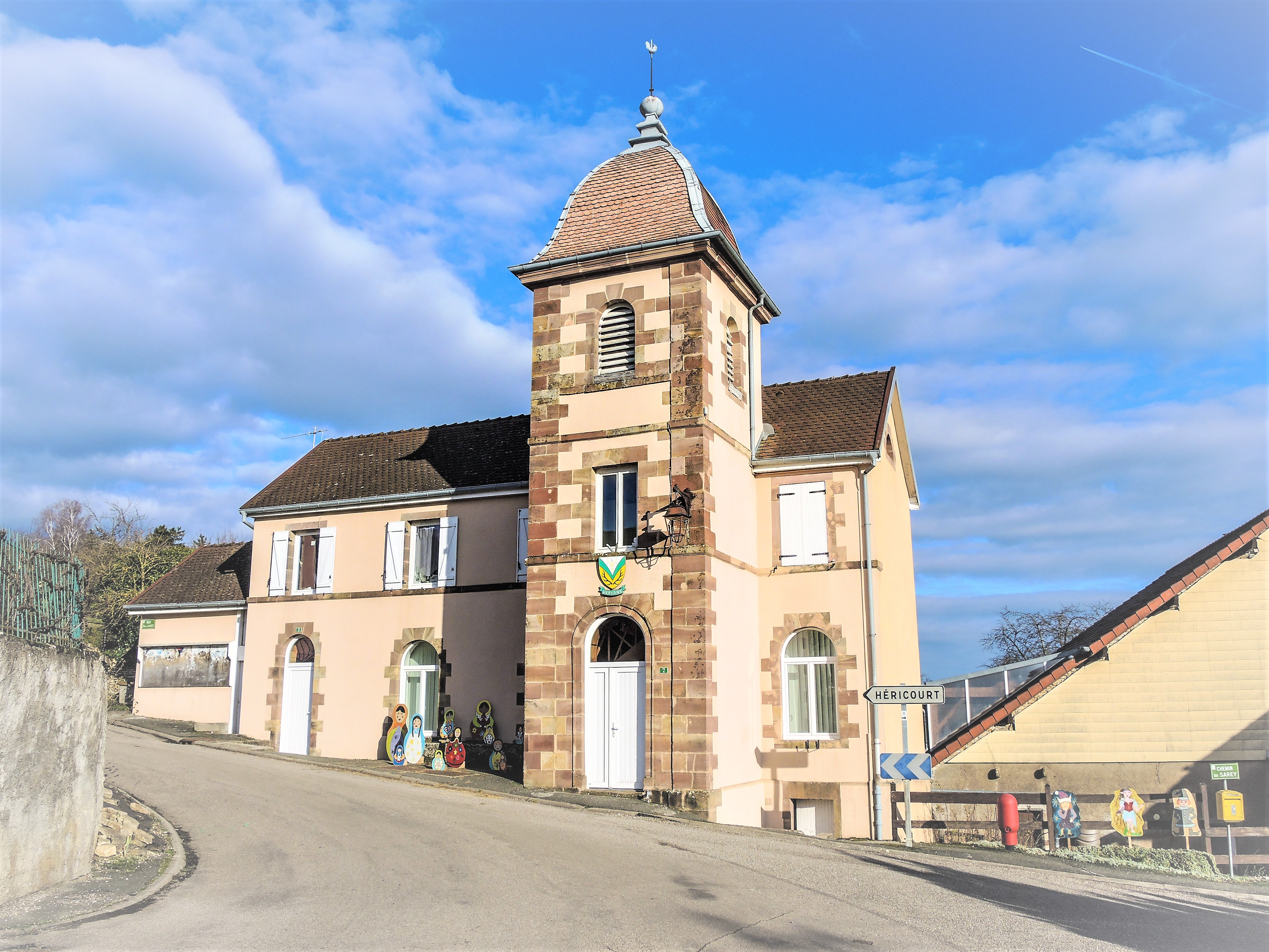
- The town hall in Verlans

- Coat of arms
- Location of Verlans
- Location within France Location within Bourgogne-Franche-Comté
- Coordinates: 47°34′21″N 6°43′18″E
- Country: France
- Region: Bourgogne-Franche-Comté
- Department: Haute-Saône
- Arrondissement: Lure
- Canton: Héricourt-2
- Intercommunality: CC pays d'Héricourt

Government
  - Mayor (2020–2026): Luc Boullée
- Area^{1}: 1.64 km^{2} (0.63 sq mi)
- Highest elevation: 481 m (1,578 ft)
- Lowest elevation: 345 m (1,132 ft)
- Population (2023): 166
  - Density: 101/km^{2} (262/sq mi)
- Time zone: UTC+01:00 (CET)
  - Summer (DST): UTC+02:00 (CEST)
- INSEE/Postal code: 70547 /70400
- ^{1} French Land Register data, which excludes lakes, ponds, glaciers > 1 km^{2} (0.386 sq mi or 247 acres) and river estuaries.

Verlans (French pronunciation: [vɛʁlɑ̃]) is a commune in the Haute-Saône department in the region of Bourgogne-Franche-Comté in eastern France.

== See also ==
- Communes of the Haute-Saône department
