= Trémoins =

- Commune
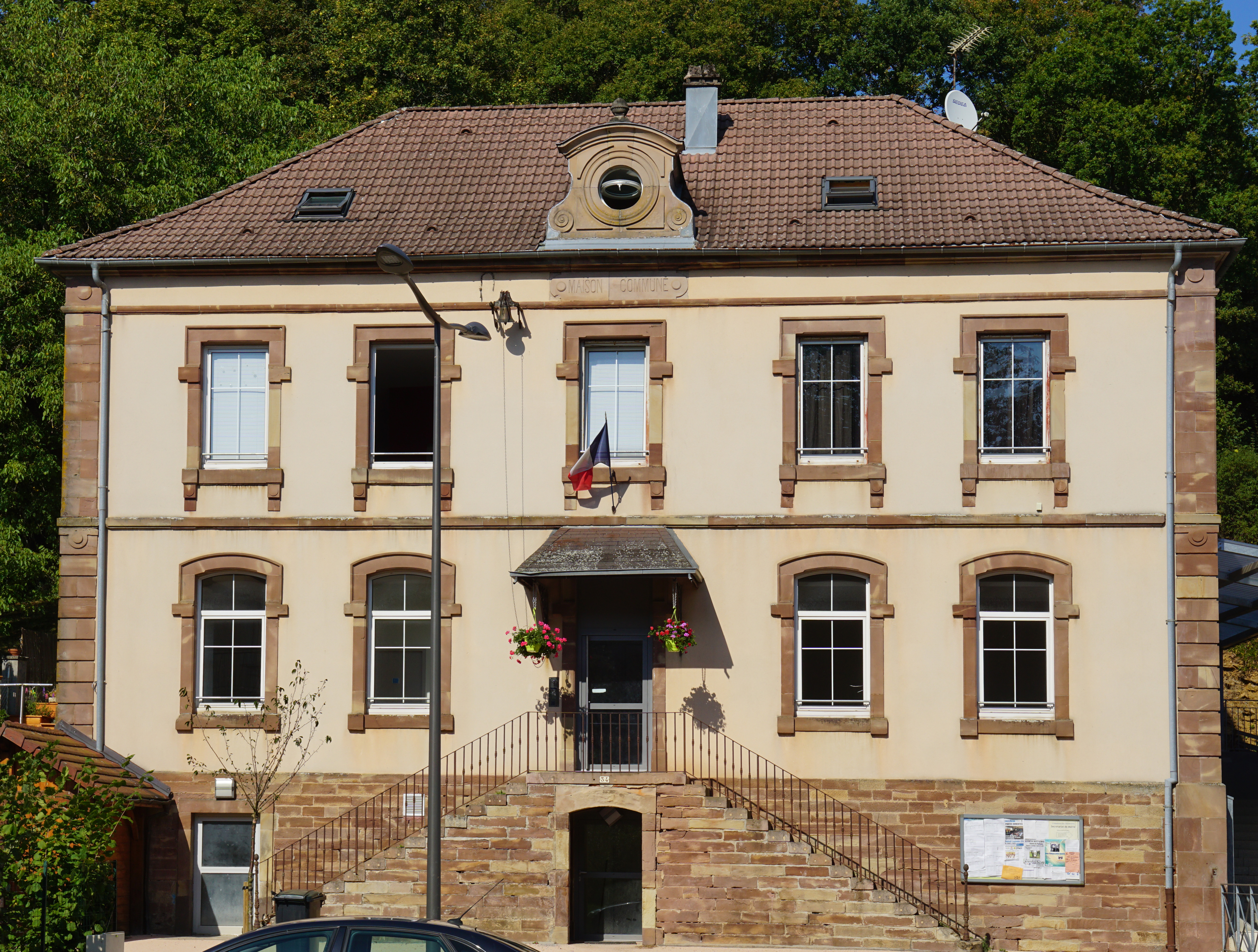
- The town hall in Trémoins
- Location of Trémoins
- Location within France Location within Bourgogne-Franche-Comté
- Coordinates: 47°33′45″N 6°42′20″E
- Country: France
- Region: Bourgogne-Franche-Comté
- Department: Haute-Saône
- Arrondissement: Lure
- Canton: Héricourt-2
- Intercommunality: CC pays d'Héricourt
- Area^{1}: 4.03 km^{2} (1.56 sq mi)
- Highest elevation: 491 m (1,611 ft)
- Lowest elevation: 352 m (1,155 ft)
- Population (2023): 385
  - Density: 95.5/km^{2} (247/sq mi)
- Time zone: UTC+01:00 (CET)
  - Summer (DST): UTC+02:00 (CEST)
- INSEE/Postal code: 70506 /70400
- ^{1} French Land Register data, which excludes lakes, ponds, glaciers > 1 km^{2} (0.386 sq mi or 247 acres) and river estuaries.

Trémoins is a commune in the Haute-Saône department in the region of Bourgogne-Franche-Comté in eastern France.

== See also ==
- Communes of the Haute-Saône department
