= Belverne =

- Commune
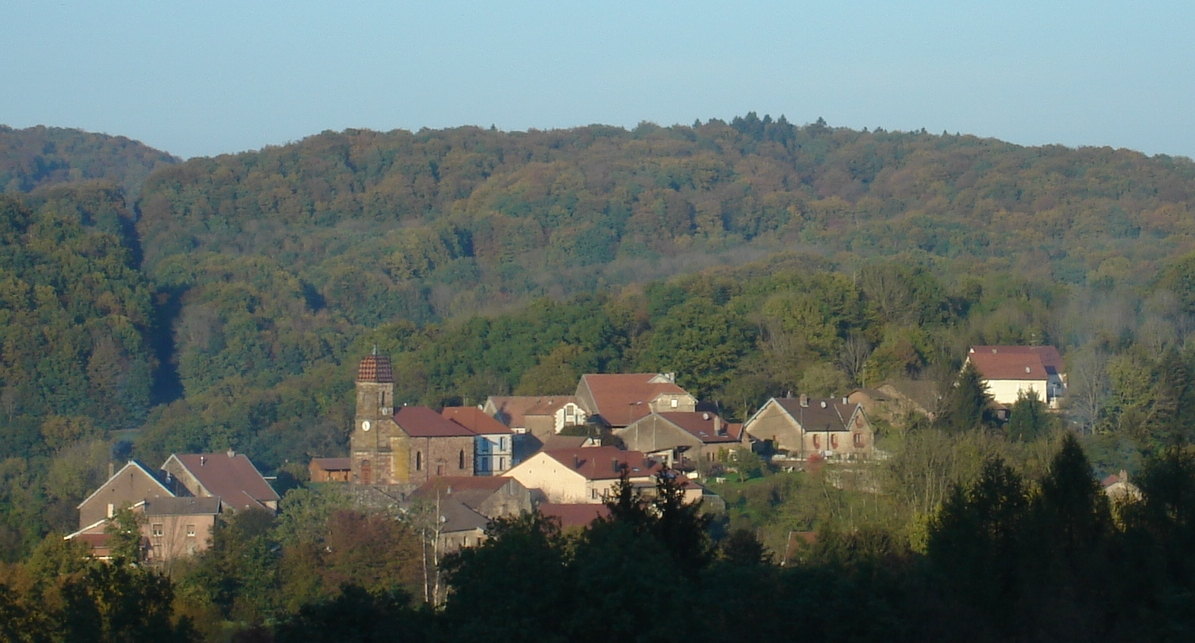
- A general view of Belverne

- Coat of arms
- Location of Belverne
- Location within France Location within Bourgogne-Franche-Comté
- Coordinates: 47°37′54″N 6°39′05″E
- Country: France
- Region: Bourgogne-Franche-Comté
- Department: Haute-Saône
- Arrondissement: Lure
- Canton: Héricourt-2
- Intercommunality: CC pays d'Héricourt

Government
  - Mayor (2021–2026): Roger Hasenfratz
- Area^{1}: 6.15 km^{2} (2.37 sq mi)
- Highest elevation: 500 m (1,600 ft)
- Lowest elevation: 322 m (1,056 ft)
- Population (2023): 134
  - Density: 21.8/km^{2} (56.4/sq mi)
- Time zone: UTC+01:00 (CET)
  - Summer (DST): UTC+02:00 (CEST)
- INSEE/Postal code: 70064 /70400
- ^{1} French Land Register data, which excludes lakes, ponds, glaciers > 1 km^{2} (0.386 sq mi or 247 acres) and river estuaries.

Belverne (French pronunciation: [bɛlvɛʁn]) is a commune in the Haute-Saône department in the region of Bourgogne-Franche-Comté in eastern France.

== See also ==
- Communes of the Haute-Saône department
