= Canton of Héricourt-2 =

Coordinates: 47.57°N 6.76°E

The canton of Héricourt-2 is an administrative division of the Haute-Saône department, northeastern France. It was created at the French canton reorganisation, which came into effect in March 2015. Its seat is found in Héricourt.

It consists of the following communes:

1. Belverne
2. Champey
3. Chavanne
4. Chenebier
5. Coisevaux
6. Courmont
7. Couthenans
8. Étobon
9. Héricourt (partly)
10. Saulnot
11. Trémoins
12. Verlans
13. Villers-sur-Saulnot
14. Vyans-le-Val
