= Chenebier =

- Commune
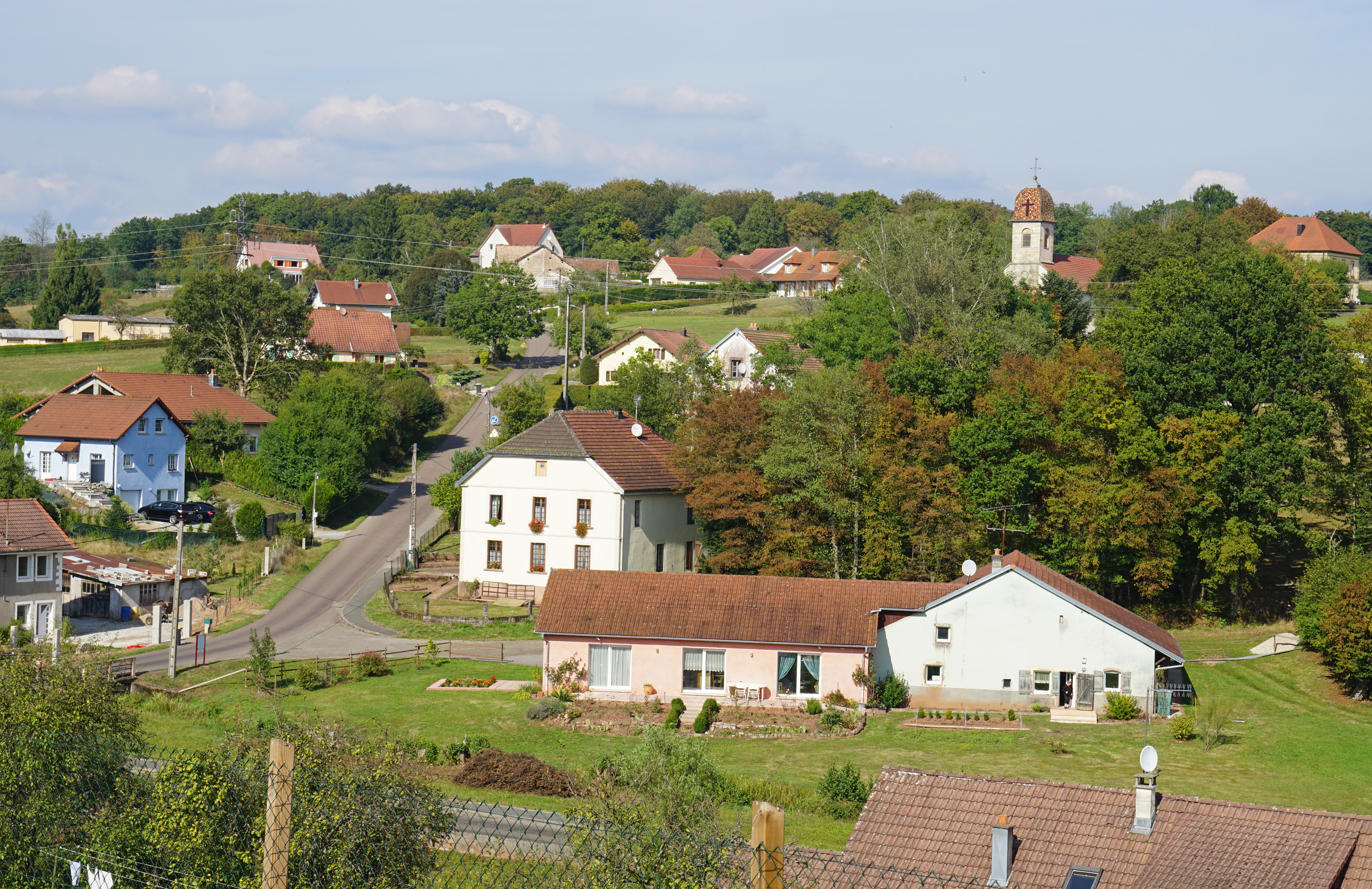
- A general view of Chenebier

- Coat of arms
- Location of Chenebier
- Location within France Location within Bourgogne-Franche-Comté
- Coordinates: 47°38′32″N 6°43′10″E
- Country: France
- Region: Bourgogne-Franche-Comté
- Department: Haute-Saône
- Arrondissement: Lure
- Canton: Héricourt-2
- Intercommunality: CC pays d'Héricourt

Government
  - Mayor (2020–2026): Francis Abry
- Area^{1}: 9.05 km^{2} (3.49 sq mi)
- Highest elevation: 472 m (1,549 ft)
- Lowest elevation: 346 m (1,135 ft)
- Population (2023): 701
  - Density: 77.5/km^{2} (201/sq mi)
- Time zone: UTC+01:00 (CET)
  - Summer (DST): UTC+02:00 (CEST)
- INSEE/Postal code: 70149 /70400
- ^{1} French Land Register data, which excludes lakes, ponds, glaciers > 1 km^{2} (0.386 sq mi or 247 acres) and river estuaries.

Chenebier (French pronunciation: [ʃənbje]) is a commune in the Haute-Saône department in the region of Bourgogne-Franche-Comté in eastern France.

Around 739 inhabitants live there; they are called "Chenaillots" and "Chenaillottes". Chenebier is surrounded by other villages such as Chagey, Echavanne and Etobon. The closest town is Belfort (department of Territoire de Belfort) and is located 10 kilometers away (North-West). The village lies at some 381 meters elevation and is close to the Ballon des Vosges Natural Park. The mayor is Francis Abry.

== See also ==
- Communes of the Haute-Saône department
