= Héricourt, Haute-Saône =

Héricourt
- Commune
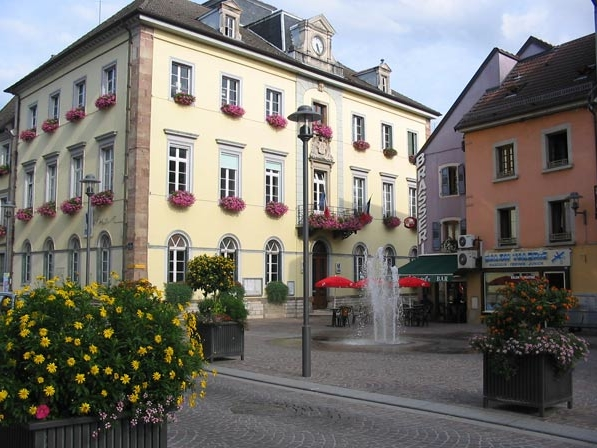
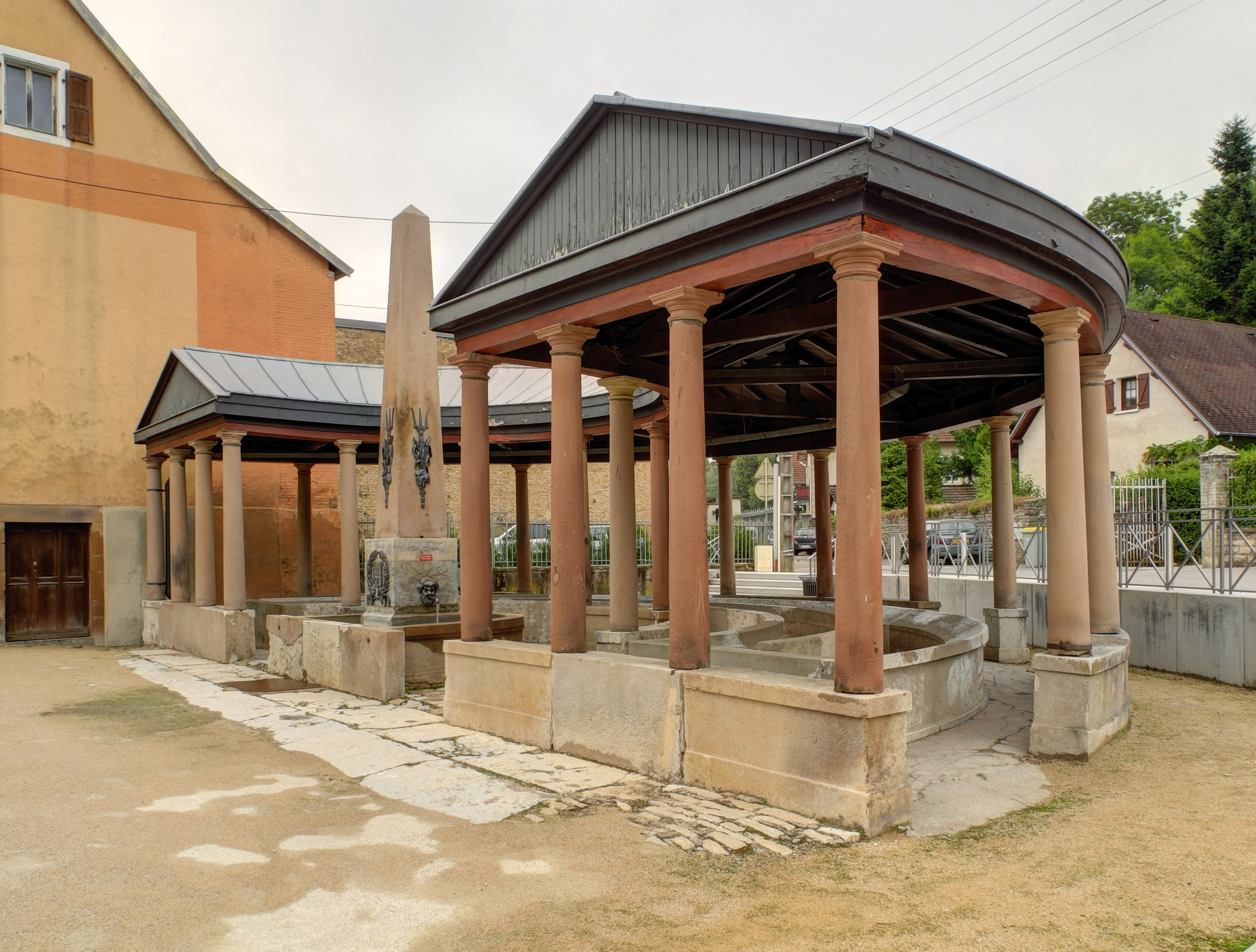
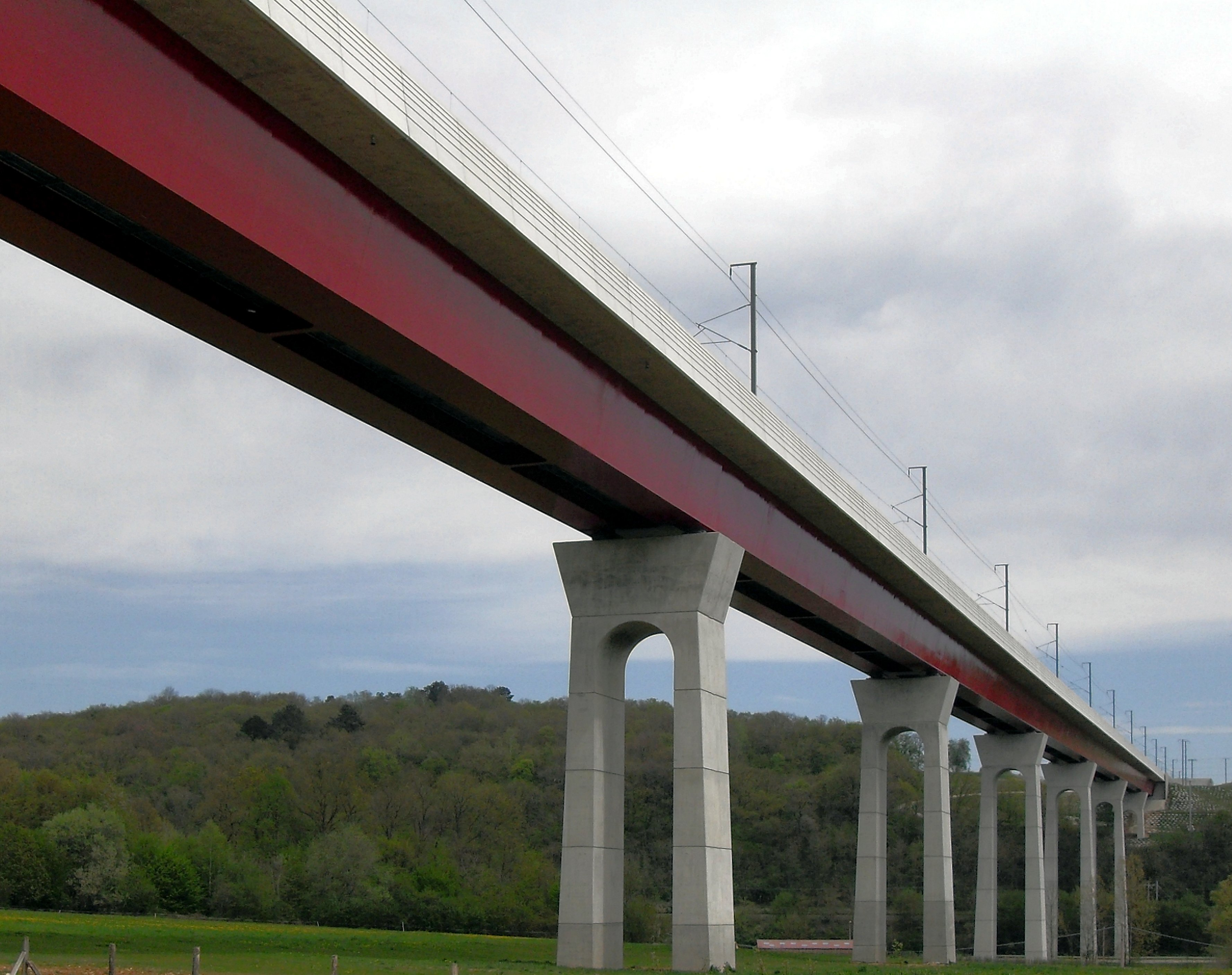
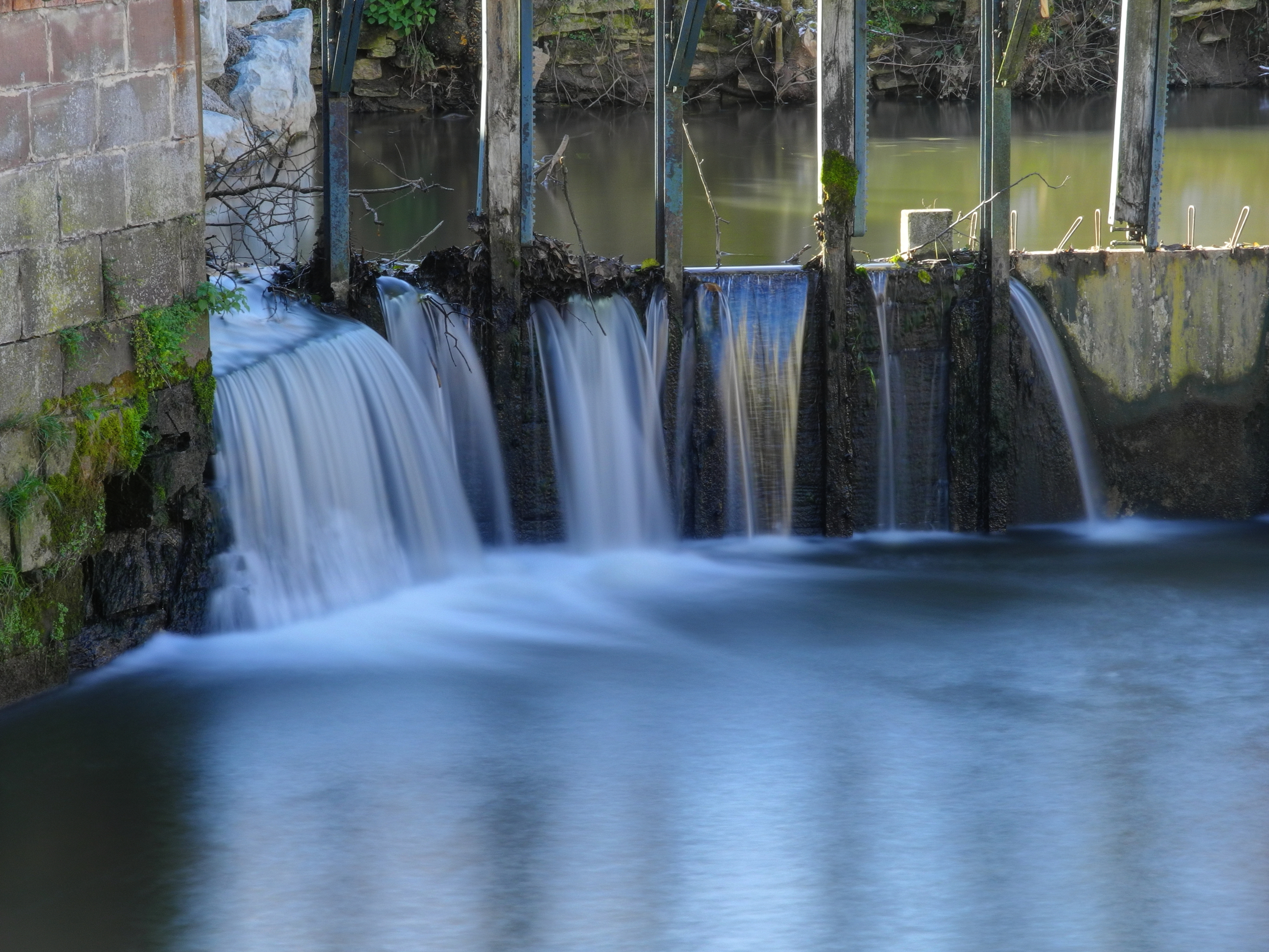

- Coat of arms
- Location of Héricourt
- Location within France Location within Bourgogne-Franche-Comté
- Coordinates: 47°34′42″N 6°45′44″E
- Country: France
- Region: Bourgogne-Franche-Comté
- Department: Haute-Saône
- Arrondissement: Lure
- Canton: Héricourt-1 and 2
- Intercommunality: CC du pays d'Héricourt

Government
  - Mayor (2020–2026): Fernand Burkhalter
- Area^{1}: 21.04 km^{2} (8.12 sq mi)
- Highest elevation: 541 m (1,775 ft)
- Lowest elevation: 320 m (1,050 ft)
- Population (2023): 10,621
  - Density: 504.8/km^{2} (1,307/sq mi)
- Time zone: UTC+01:00 (CET)
  - Summer (DST): UTC+02:00 (CEST)
- INSEE/Postal code: 70285 /70400
- ^{1} French Land Register data, which excludes lakes, ponds, glaciers > 1 km^{2} (0.386 sq mi or 247 acres) and river estuaries.

Héricourt (French pronunciation: [eʁikuʁ]) is a commune in the Haute-Saône department in the region of Bourgogne-Franche-Comté in eastern France. Héricourt is the second most populated commune in the department after Vesoul. The town is part of the functional area of Montbéliard, but is also close to Belfort.

Héricourt is linked to the little villages of Brévilliers, Chagey, Champey, Chenebier, Coisevaux, Couthenans, Echenans sous Mont-Vaudois, Etobon, Luze, Mandrevillars, Saulnot, Trémoins, Verlans, Villers-sur-Saulnot, Vyans-le-Val and they form the Communauté de communes du pays d'Héricourt. On 1 January 2019, the former commune Tavey was merged into Héricourt.

== Population ==
Historical population
Year	Pop.	±% p.a.
1968	8,237	—
1975	8,853	+1.04%
1982	10,374	+2.29%
1990	10,079	−0.36%
1999	10,463	+0.42%
2007	10,860	+0.47%
2012	10,669	−0.35%
2017	10,601	−0.13%
2023	10,621	+0.03%
Source: INSEE

== Culture and Heritage ==
=== Monuments ===
- The "Grosse tour" is the only tower which remains, a vestige of the medieval castle. In the courtyard, one can still access the old well, and the storeroom has been converted into a receiving room.
- The Lutheran church of Saint-Christophe is quite important to the history of Héricourt because it shows the passing of the Wurtemberg's Dukes, just as in Montbéliard.
- The Minal Museum was named after Emile Minal, a man who lived in the city and who had accumulated many works of art. When he died, his wife donated his collection of art to the city. The Museum hosts many temporary expositions
- The factory's chimney remains to remind us of the ancient industry of weaving.
- The fountain of "Savourot" is quite particular because of his half-circle shape. More recently, the city has decided to raze to the ground the house which obstructed the view to the fountain.
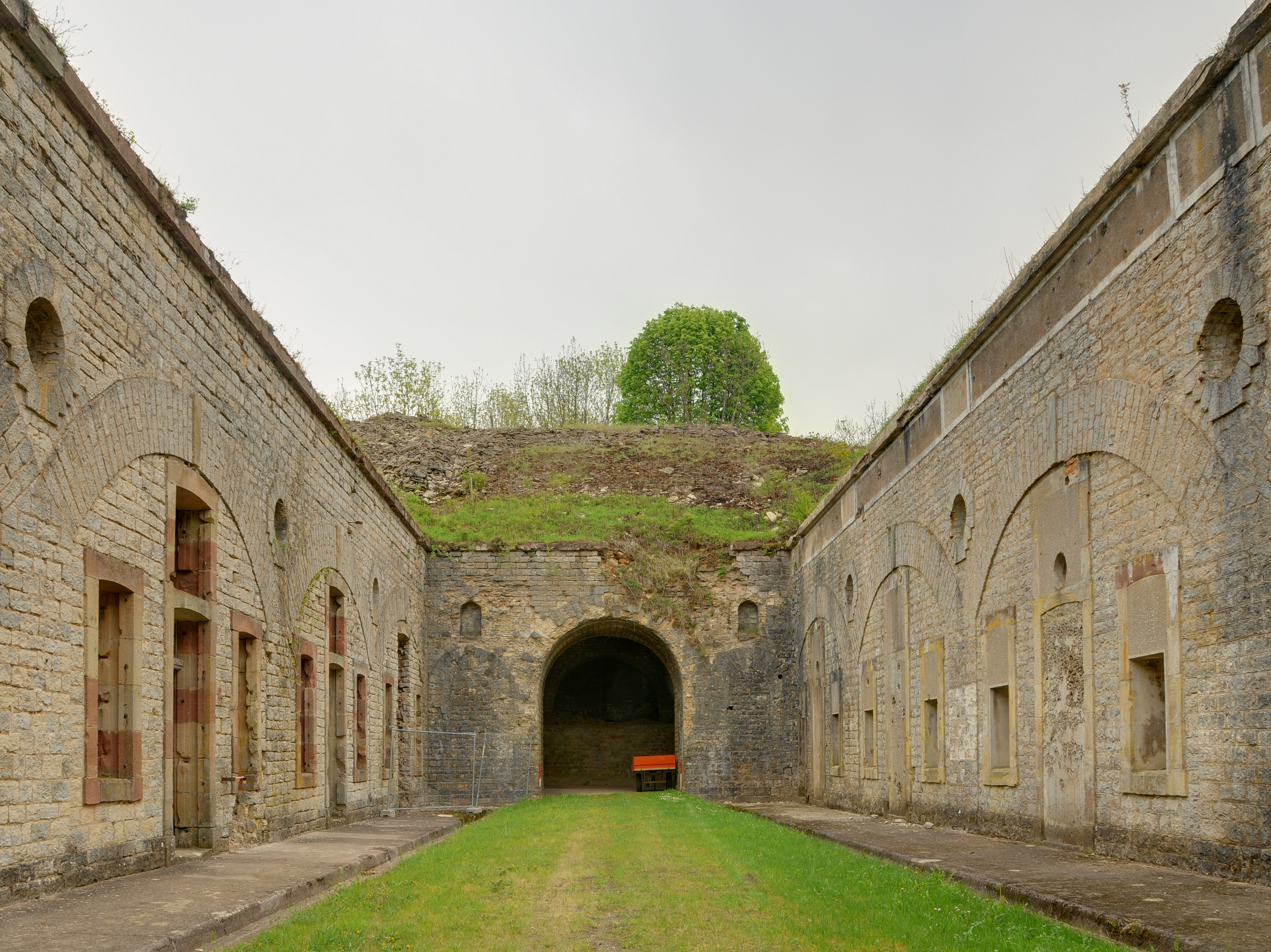
Fort du Mont Vaudois

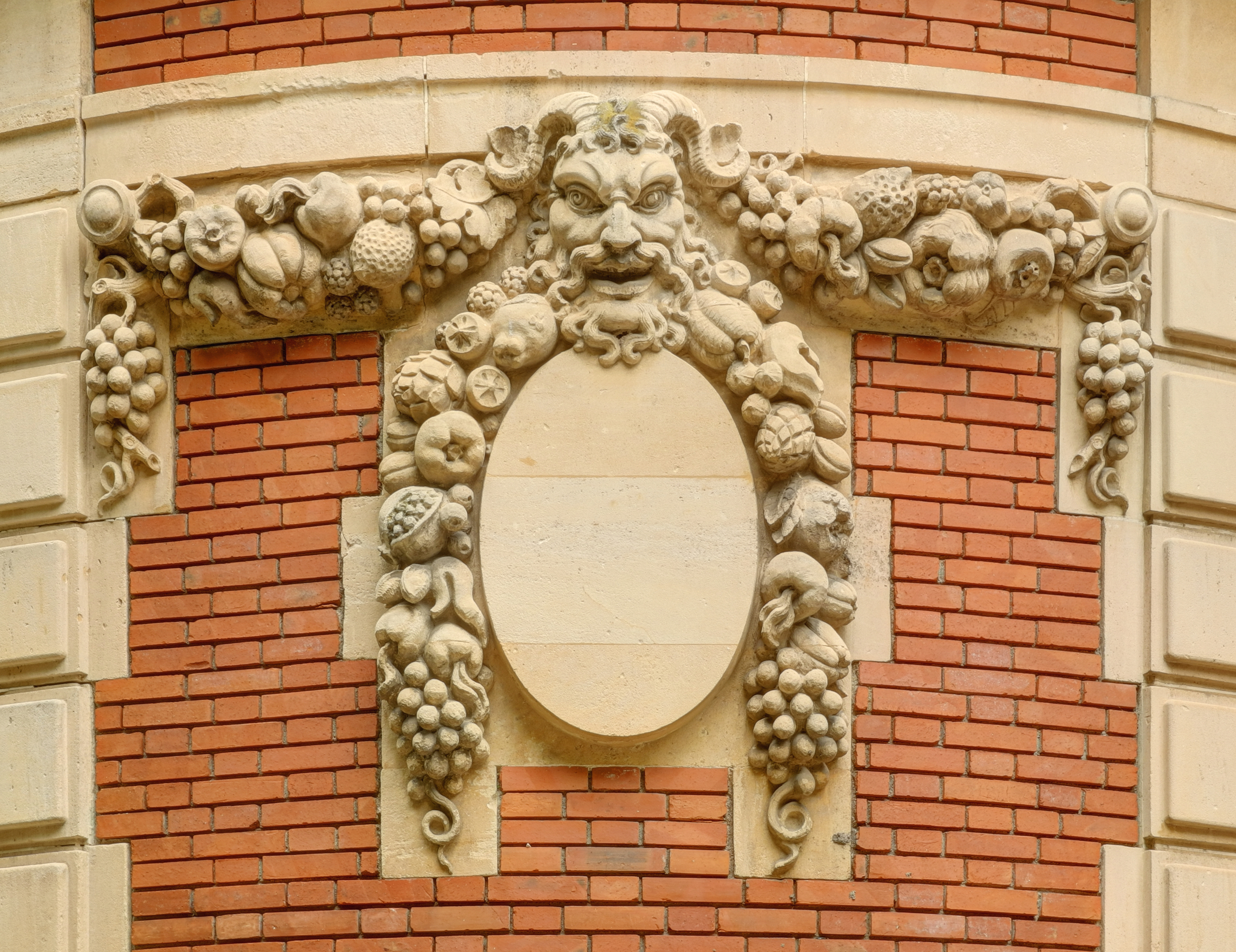
Minal Museum

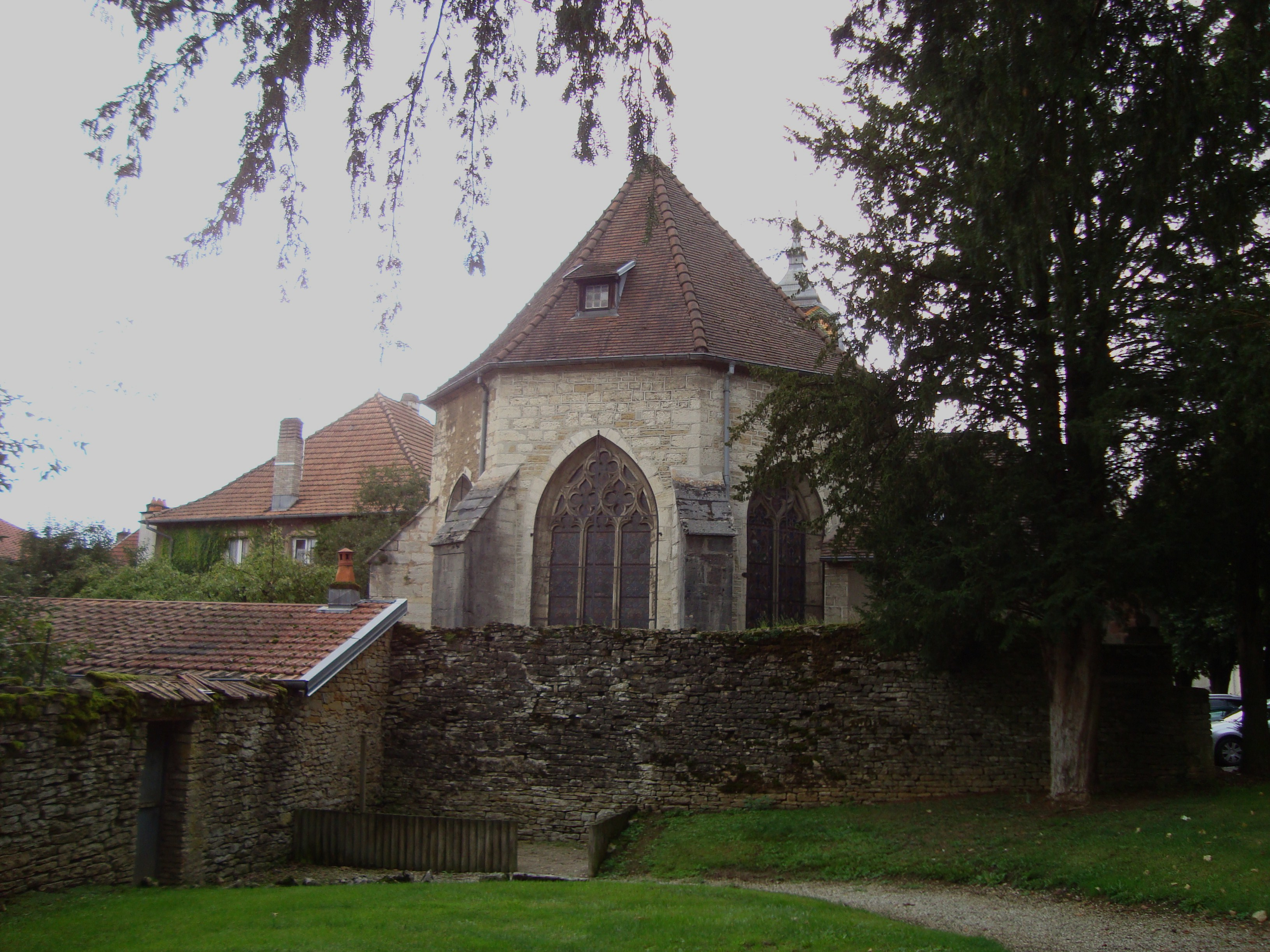
Lutheran church Saint-Christophe

== See also ==
- Communes of the Haute-Saône department
