= Pierre Jacques Dormoy =

French engineer, inventor and industry captain

Pierre Jacques Dormoy (November 25, 1825, in Couthenans, Haute-Saône, France – July 30, 1892, in Bordeaux, Gironde) was a French engineer, inventor, industry captain, the creator of the Dormoy foundries as well as a political and economic personality in Bordeaux. His political activities in Bordeaux were instrumental in arousing the political vocation of his son, Albert Dormoy, an MP for the Gironde département.

== Biography ==
=== Family ===
Jacques Pierre Dormoy was born in Couthenans on November 25, 1825, into a Protestant family. He was one of the twelve children of Pierre Dormoy Louis (1787-1860) and Suzanne Marguerite Dormoy (1794-1870). He married Jeanne Elisabeth Geraud (1835-1892), who gave him a son, Albert Dormoy.

=== Studies ===
Jacques Pierre Dormoy obtained an engineering degree from the Chalon-sur-Saône School of Arts and Crafts at the age of 20 after three years of study (1842-1845).

=== Professional career ===
==== The engineer ====
After several years as a “skilful engineer and designer” in some of the major construction firms in Paris (he was a foreman first at Gouin, where his skills made quite an impression, then at the Tronchon metalworking firm), he became in 1856 a foreman of cars and wagons ("chef de la carrosserie”) to the newly established Compagnie des chemins de fer du Midi (Midi Railway Company) in Bordeaux.

==== The industry Captain ====
A few years later, in 1862, he founded the Dormoy foundry, a bronze foundry specializing in both industrial products and works of art which was flourishing after some initial difficulties.

==== The inventor ====
Jacques Pierre Dormoy was the inventor in 1853 of a "glazing system", the co-inventor in 1854, with Antoine Abraham Champeaux, of a "circular rolling mill" for producing tires for rail vehicles., in 1857, with Guillaume de Saint-Christophe, a lubrication mode called "hydrostatic lubrication" ("boîte Dormoy"). and, in 1859, with Théophile Dubois, a car cover system called "mixed covering."

=== Political, municipal and cultural commitment ===
==== The Republican ====
A member of the Republican Party in Bordeaux, he was described as "a sincere Republican and as firm as moderate."

==== The administrator ====
He was councillor and deputy mayor of Bordeaux for 20 years, from 1871 to 1892, mainly for publics works (under Mayor Albert Brandenburg – 1878-1884 –, he was deputy in charge of military affairs and fires).

==== The philanthropist ====
He also chaired the Bordeaux Voltaire Circle and founded in 1867 the Friends of Basic Education Society.

He was also one of the first members of the Society of Arts et Métiers Alumni.

=== Last moments ===
Suffering from a serious disease for two years, he died on July 30, 1892, at Bordeaux

He was buried in the Protestant cemetery of Bordeaux.

The management of the foundry was taken over by his son, Albert Dormoy, in 1894.

=== Awards ===
He was a Knight of the Order of Academic Palms.

=== Tribute ===
The municipality of Bordeaux honoured him by giving his name to a square of the town: "place Pierre Jacques Dormoy".

== Bibliography ==
- Guillaume, Sylvie; Lachaise, Bernard (1998). Dictionnaire des parlementaires d'Aquitaine sous la Troisième République (in French). Talence, France: Presses universitaires de Bordeaux. ISBN 2-86781-231-3. OCLC 41448746.
- Charles Verrier, Notice nécrologique de Pierre Dormoy, in Bulletin administratif no 8, août 1892, p. 495-500 (read online)
