= Stained glass windows of Chartres Cathedral =

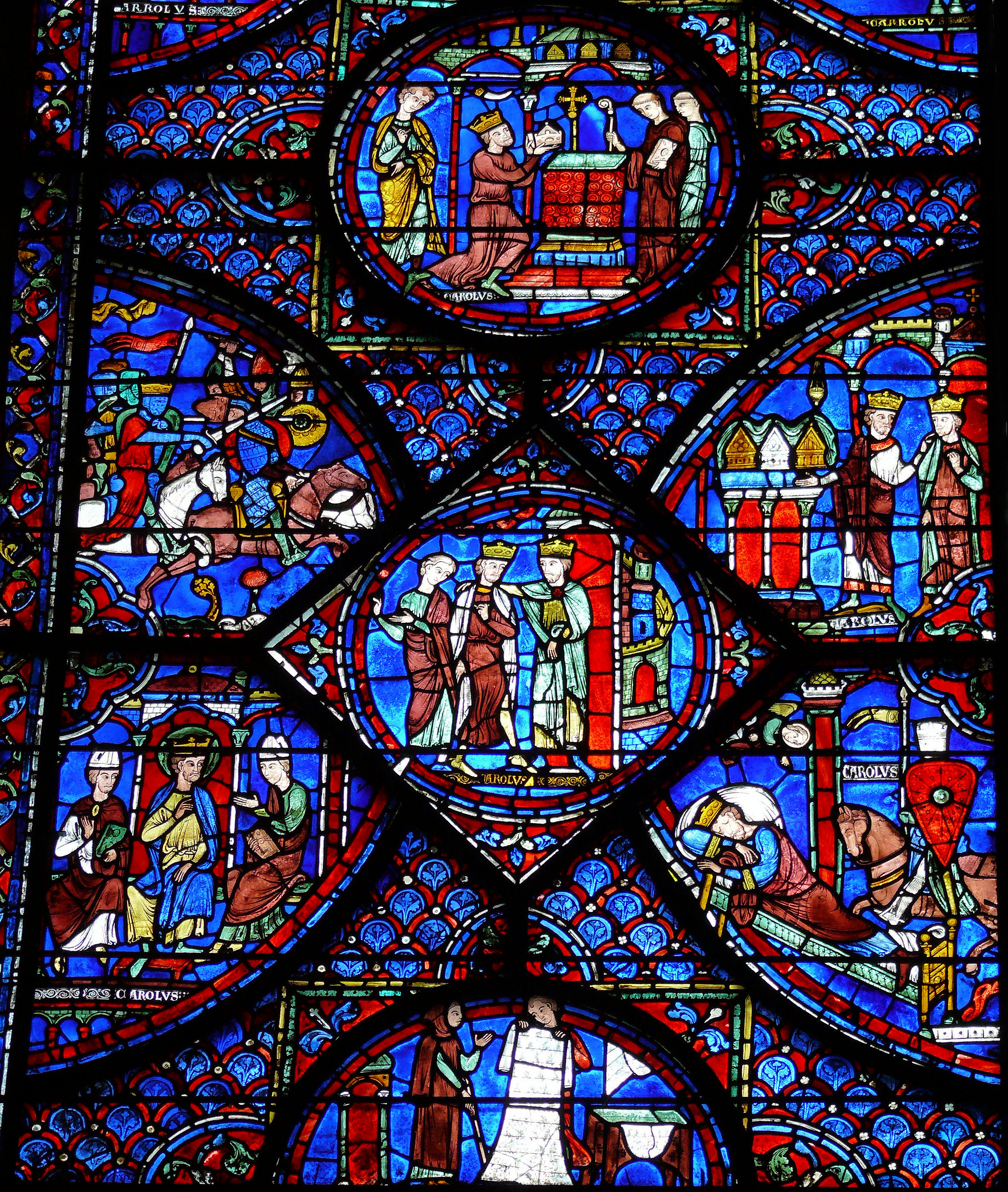
Life of Charlemagne (detail of bay 7)

The stained glass windows of Chartres Cathedral are known to be one of the best-preserved, and most complete set of medieval stained glass, notably celebrated for their colours, especially their cobalt blue. They cover 2600 square metres in total and consist of 167 windows illustrating biblical scenes, the lives of the saints and scenes from the life of trade guilds of the period.

Some windows survive from an earlier Chartres Cathedral, such as the three lancets on the west front (1145–1155, contemporary with those made for Abbot Suger at the Basilica of Saint-Denis) and the lancet south of the choir known as 'Notre-Dame de la Belle Verrière', famed for its Chartres blue (1180). However, most of the windows were probably made between 1205 and 1240 for the present church, taking in the Fourth Crusade (bringing a large number of important relics to Chartres) and the Albigensian Crusade, as well as the reigns of Philip II Augustus (1180–1223) and Louis VIII (1223–1226), with the building's consecration finally occurring in 1260 under Louis IX (1226–1270).

Some of the windows were made later, such as those in the Vendôme Chapel (1400–1425) and some in the transepts (20th century), whilst some damaged 13th-century windows were restored from the 15th century onwards. The destruction of Reims Cathedral and its stained glass in 1914 caused shock across France and led to all Chartres' windows being taken out and stored throughout both world wars. Conservation and removal of pollution has been ongoing since 1972. Preliminary studies were carried out by the Laboratoire de recherche des monuments historiques.

== Windows ==
Plan of the windows

Since the late 10th century all churches across Europe had been built in a common Romanesque style, with thick walls supported by massive external buttresses and often with barrel vaulted naves. This limited the number of windows, leading to a play of light and shade which builders compensated for by adding internal frescoes in bright colours. In northern France buildings in this style would still be quite dark, with semi-circular arches not allowing large windows. The lateral forces on the walls were very important and higher vaults inevitably meant a thicker wall to support and reinforce them. By contrast, lancet windows and ogive crossings allowed the forces to be spread across multiple points, meaning the walls no longer had to support the structures' whole weight and could have far more openings for windows. Thus far more light was allowed into the structure for the glass-painters and their colours to work with, though nothing could now be seen of the exterior from the interior.

This architectural advance ran in parallel with theological developments in the 12th century, dominated by the clergy. Genesis 1.1-5 evoked darkness and light, as elaborated by Abbot Suger alongside his reasons for rebuilding the choir of the church at Saint-Denis Abbey. When his contemporaries assisting in the choir's consecration in 1144, they were astonished by the amount of light entering the building. In his "On the Construction of the Church of St Denis", Suger justified the bright side chapels "thanks to which the whole church shines with wondrous light, uninterrupted by sparkling windows which radiate their beauty into the interior". This new art (known at the time as Opus Francigenum and only named Gothic architecture in the 17th century) spread from the Kingdom of France right across Europe. To quote Louis Grodecki, it was in the Abbey Church of St Denis "that Gothic architecture first emerges as a consistent way of building, fruitful in its solutions of independent ogives, arcus singulariter voluti as the abbot called them. (Note: …cum necdum principales arcus singulariter voluti voltarum cumulo cohaererent…) The works at St Denis also included the first-ever rose window in its west façade.

In around 827 Louis the Pious had given St Denis Abbey a Greek manuscript of the works of Pseudo-Dionysius the Areopagite, which he had himself received from Michael II, Emperor of Byzantium. This manuscript and John Scotus Eriugena's interpretation of it was the origin for the whole mystical Free Spirit current in medieval theology, which strongly influenced Suger, an exact contemporary of Hugues de Saint-Victor, the most notable master in Paris at the time. He was comforted by his vision of the world, written in 1125 in his commentaries on Pseudo-Denis' Celestial Hierarchies. Georges Duby wrote "Hugues de Saint-Denis proclaimed that each sensed image is a sign or "sacrament" of invisible things, those things which the soul will discover when it is freed from its bodily envelope". He laid out three stages in this progression from the visible to the invisible:

- Cogito: exploring the perceivable world by studying abstract thought
- Meditatio: the soul looking upon itself introspectively
- Contemplatio: intuition of truth

The first affirmation Suger made is work was "God is light", quoting from the First Epistle of John 1,5 ("The news that we have learned from him and are announcing to you is that God is light and that in him there is nothing of darkness"). He backed up this identification of God with light with other texts from the Old and New Testaments and argued that such a truth had to be made manifest in a cathedral, since in such a church a bishop taught his Christian flock, a foretaste of the heavenly Jerusalem described in Revelations 21, 11-14 ("Its lustre was like that of a most precious stone, of jaspar stone transparent like crystal"). Entering by the cathedral's west door and moving towards the choir and high altar to receive communion, the faithful had to be able to go through the different stages described by Hugues de Saint-Victor.

Using the language of colour and changing harmonies according to the time of day, the stained glass windows formed a doxological liturgy, a canticle whose words were the images, a metaphor first used by Pope Honorius III in his 1219 letter to Stephen Langton - "That the happy church at Canterbury may thus sing a new song to the Lord". Stained glass windows were also linked with theological questions about baptism and the eucharist, two sacraments violently affected by heresies but firmly doctrinally defended by Eudes de Sully and the Fourth Lateran Council. Augustine of Hippo's City of God had already written that heretics would escape eternal damnation if they had received baptism and communion. Sacraments were often at the centre of stained glass windows, such as the windows on the lives of St Martin, St Paul and St Sylvester at Chartres, the third of these showing that saint's baptism of Constantine the Great. The Chartres windows on the lives of the Apostles also showed them baptising new disciples. However, such windows could only obliquely refer to the fierce debates about the problem of real presence and the moment of transubstantiation - the central medallions of the Chartres windows on the life of St Lubin (bay 45) show the stages in the wine's transformation into the blood of Christ. Other windows referred to other rites under debate in the late 12th century - confession, the hierarchy of church power, marriage, extreme unction, finding relics and translating relics.

Some windows referred to political theology such as the status of princes and kings and the balance of temporal and spiritual power. At a time when the kings of France were defending their hereditary right to rule, Chartres' windows of the Tree of Jesse showed the continuous line from the Kings of Judah to Christ via the Virgin Mary, whilst the windows on the life of Thomas Becket showed the recent clash in England between temporal and spiritual power. The windows on the life of St Sylvester were placed symmetrically with those on the life of Charlemagne - the former show Constantine as a bloodthirsty tyrant who later summoned St Sylvester to hear his repentance and heal him of leprosy, hearing his preaching and submitting to him after baptism, whilst those of Charlemagne show a royal figure that the Church could support (indeed, one that had been canonised on 29 December 1165 by Antipope Paschal III, though that canonisation was not recognised by the mainstream Church). These windows were probably chosen by Reginald of Bar, Bishop of Chartres and cousin of Philip II Augustus, who portrayed himself as the new Charlemagne, taking up the theme Suger had chosen for Saint-Denis to flatter Louis VI of France.

== Schemes ==
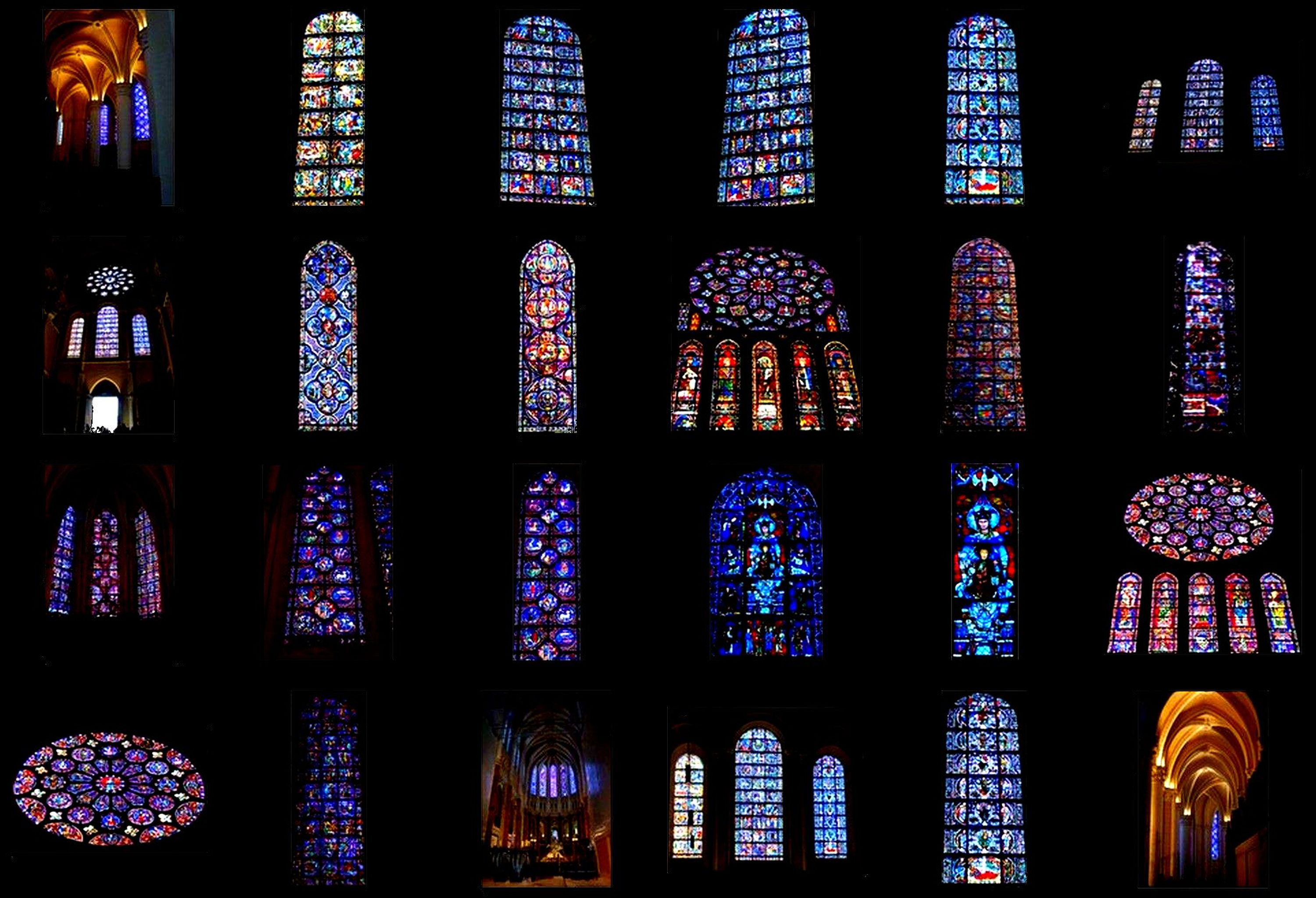
The windows as an ensemble

Understanding and interpreting the windows can be difficult in an era out of contact with medieval theology, teachings and sermons commenting on the Gothic cathedrals' stained glass windows. However, the presence of the famous 12th-century School of Chartres suggests that the precise placing of the windows had meaning for their designers. As taken up in the design of other Gothic churches, Suger's arguments showed how all four senses of scripture were present:

1. Literal (the product of linguistic understanding of the statement)
2. Allegorical or typological (stating one thing by saying another)
3. Tropological or Moral (stages that the human spirit had to go through in order to ascend towards God; concerning the present)
4. Anagogic (giving an idea of final realities which would become visible at the end of time; concerning the future)

The windows can be grouped in several different ways. One is between the lower levels with their narrative windows on the lives of Jesus, the Virgin Mary, the saints and the prophets, and the upper level with saints, major figures and prophets, showing the glory of the Christian Church. The narrative windows generally read from bottom to top and left to right, making connections between scenes, though the window of the Typological Passion (bay 37) is read from top to bottom. The scenes in a single window can be grouped together in squares, four-leaf flowers or lobes.

Another is reading from east (site of sunrise and reminiscent of Genesis 1) to west (site of sunset, reminiscent of Christ's death and resurrection as well as the Last Judgement) and north (with its scenes from the Bible and Christ's life) to south (announcing redemption and the Kingdom of God after Christ's second coming), two readings which can be combined across the cruciform plan of the cathedral. A rose window of the Last Judgement is placed above the main west door, whilst the north one centred on the Madonna and Child recalls the Incarnation leading to Redemption and the south one of Christ Triumphant surrounded by the 24 Elders of the Apocalypse announces Christ's second coming and the Kingdom of God.

Another interpretation divides the windows by their location in the nave, transepts and choir, with each of the three linked to a period in the history of revelation. This is more difficult to do at Chartres than in other churches. However, at this period Chartres Cathedral had hundreds of relics, not only the Virgin Mary's veil but also relics of Saints, Peter, Thomas, Catherine, Margaret and others - as it was impossible to show them all to the public the windows became a reminder of the diocese's relic collection for the faithful and pilgrims.

== Technique and workshops ==
Window glass had been made in France since the 5th century, with the oldest surviving figured glass from the country being the Wissembourg Christ. Recent restoration of the windows at Chartres has questioned Louis Grodecki's assertions that they were produced by two main workshops, one making the Good Samaritan window and the other making the Life of St Lubin window.

Stylistic analysis has revealed up to five different glass-painters who worked on the Good Samaritan window, including secondary glass-painters and a principal glass-painter, though it has also shown that a secondary glass-painter on one window might be a master glass-painter on another. This emphasis on individuals not workshops can be seen more clearly in 14th century stained glass and was probably to increase the speed of production.

Analysis of the glasses has shown they were originally the same colour and corroded identically, meaning that all the glass-painters used the same glass. The one exception is the Life of Saint Eustace window, whose glass has a different colour and has corroded differently, giving credence to Grodecki's conclusion that it was produced by an outside artist commissioned by the cathedral and bringing his own stock of glass with him.

The monk Theophilus Presbyter described glass-production in minute detail early in the 12th century in his treatise Schedula diversum artium - the glass-painter was to trace the composition of a window on a panel of bleached wood, before cutting the glass sections on it and finally painting and assembling them.

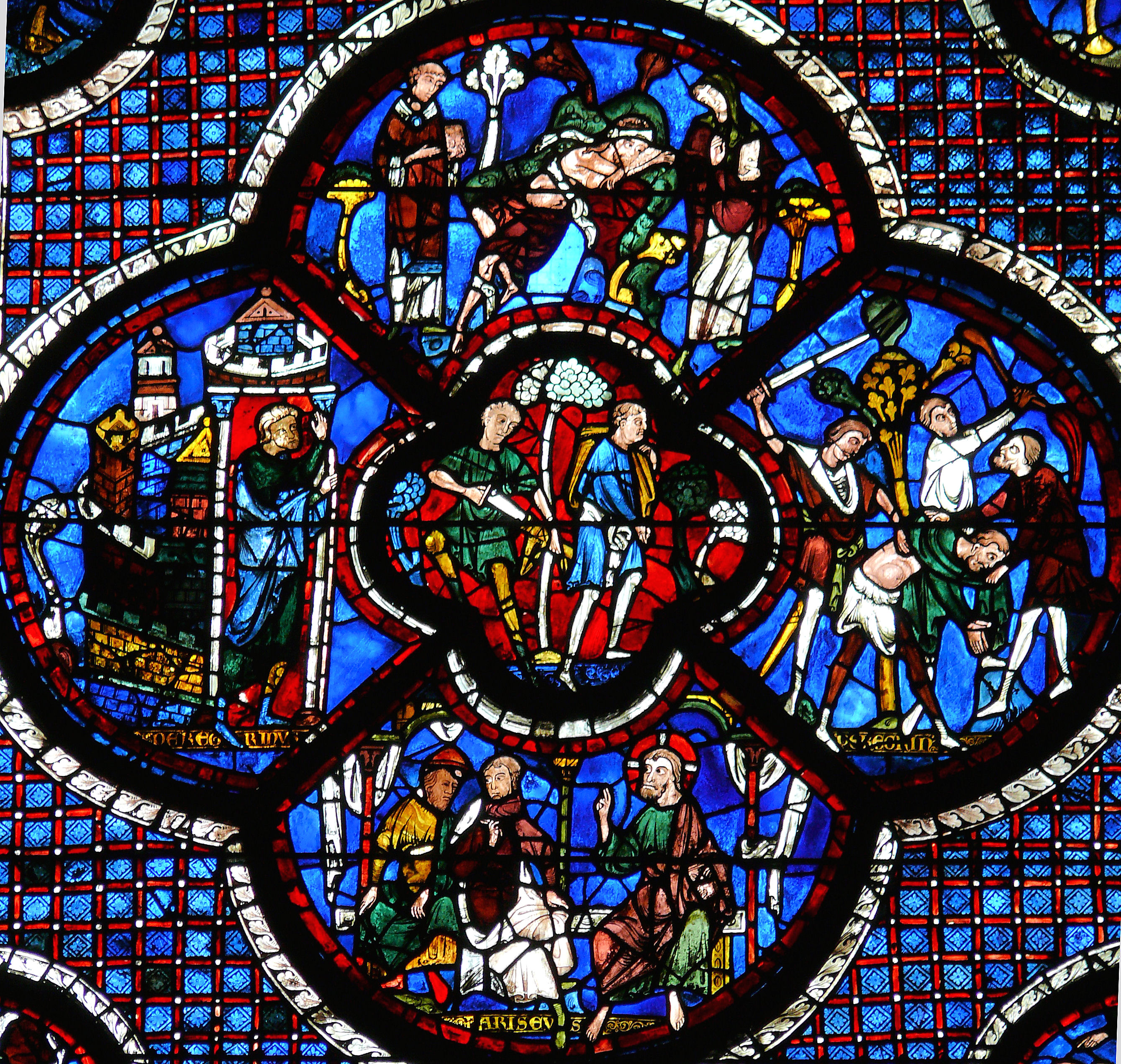
Bay 44
Parable of the Good Samaritan

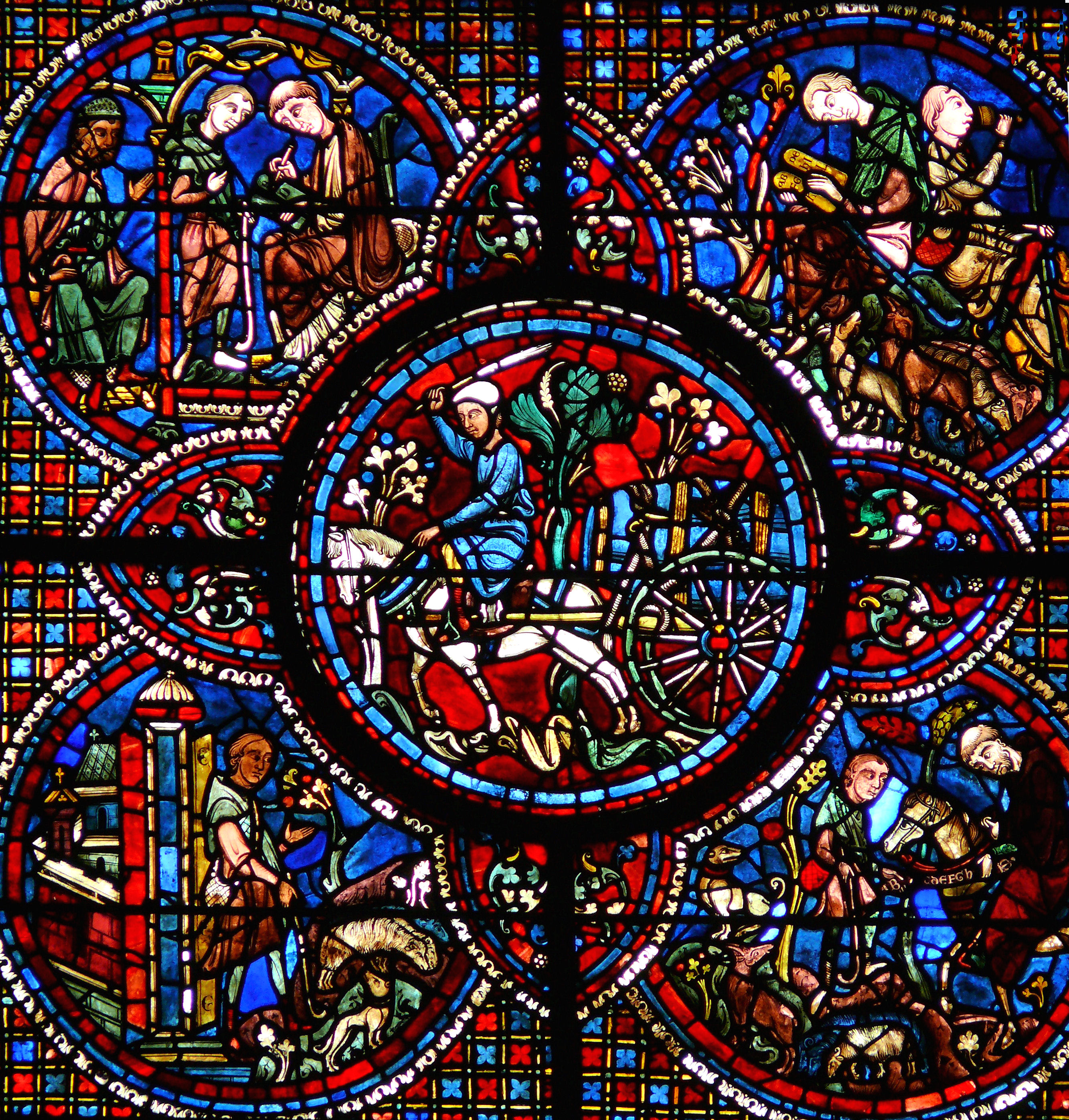
Bay 45
Life of Saint Lubin

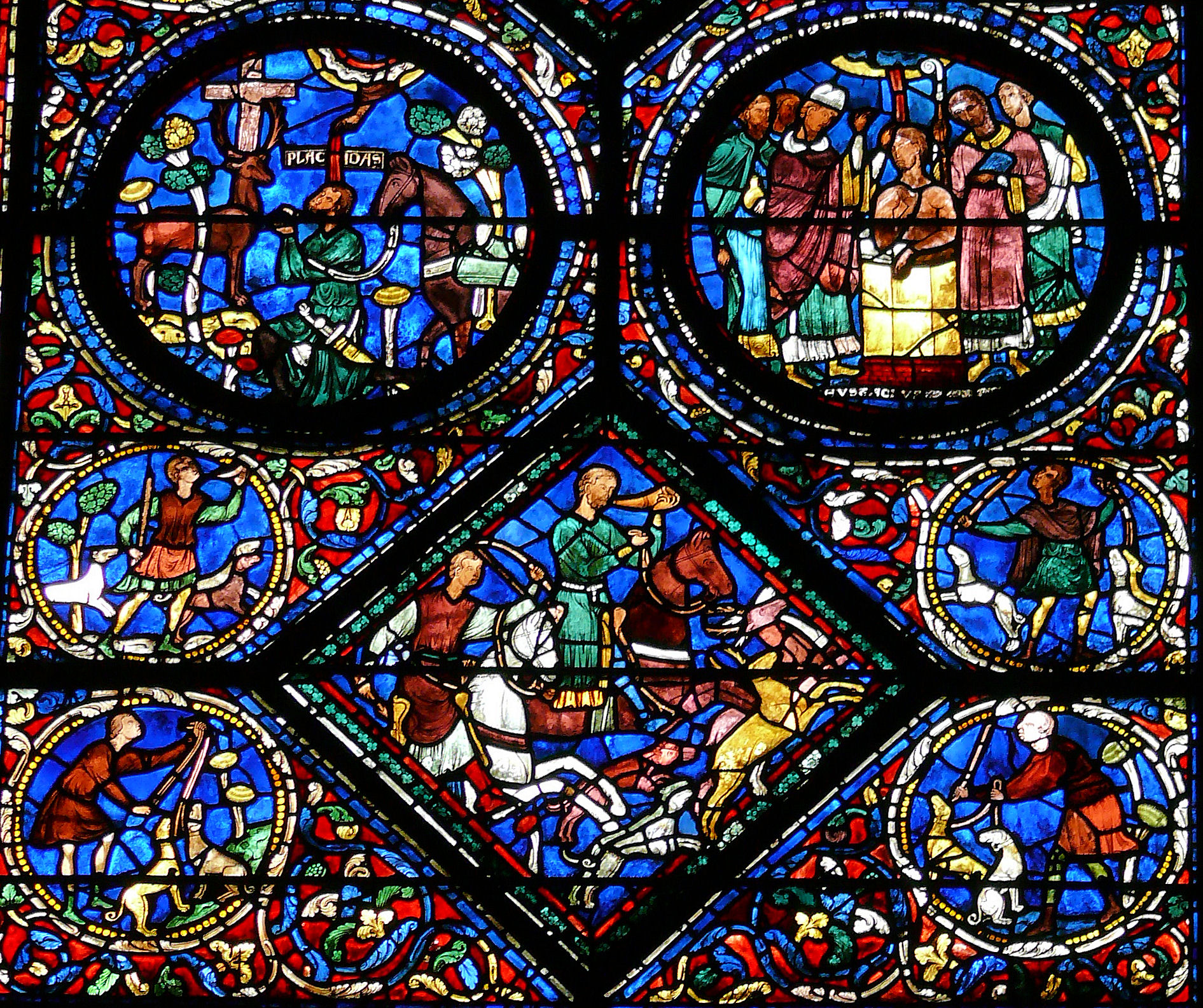
Bay 43
Life of Saint Eustace

== Bay numbering ==
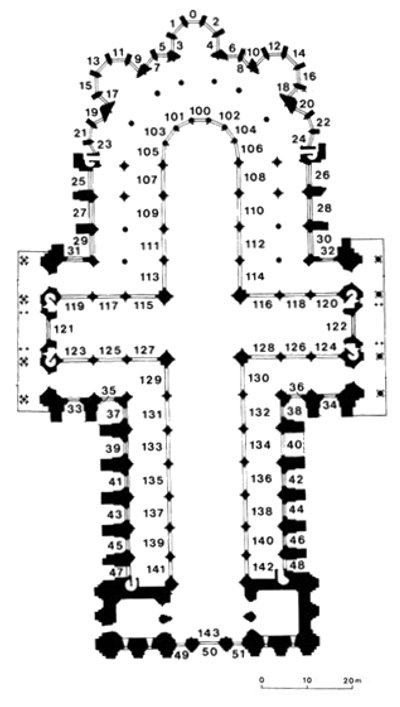
Plan of the bays

The bays' numbers were set in the Corpus vitrearum, running from 0 to 99 on the lower level, starting at the chevet and going as far as the nave facade. 0 is the bay on the axis of the apse or the axis of the chapel. The odd numbers are bays on the north side and the even numbers the bays on the south side. The upper level windows run from 100 to 199 on the same principals - bay 100 is the bay on the axis of the choir.

The best view of the lower windows' details is from the aisle and ambulatory. Starting at the centre of the nave in front of the west rose window, the windows are described in an anti-clockwise circuit, running through the south side of the nave, the south transept, the ambulatory, the north transept and finally the north side of the nave.

The upper windows are best seen from the opposite side of the aisle to the window viewed, but as they are taller than the lower windows they are harder to view. The circuit is clockwise, from the north side of the nave, the south transept, the choir, the apse, the north transept and finally the south side of the nave. Those in the nave and transepts are made up of two lancets and an eight-lobe rose window, whilst those in the choir are made up of two facing lancets below a rose and those in the apse are made up of single lancets. One has to cross the choir to see the windows behind the high altar.

== Rose windows ==
=== West ===
This consists of three lancets (bays 49–51) below a large rose-window (141), the latter formed of a 12-lobe eye and 12 sections each made up of 2 medallions, along with twelve smaller circles separated by quatrefoils. Together they form a large Christological canvas devoted to the Incarnation of the Logos as Jesus Christ, running from his Old Testament human roots (the Tree of Jesse), through his incarnation (nativity) and sacrifice (Passion), ending with redemption for those who have faith in him (the Last Judgement in the main west rose window).

The three lancets date to the mid 12th century, making them the oldest stained-glass in the cathedral. This section of the cathedral was built after a fire in 1135 and is the only part to survive the 1195 fire. The central lancet shows Christ's nativity and life and is flanked by two slightly smaller lancets of his Passion and his human and Davidic roots with a Tree of Jesse, (Note: Jesse begat King David. Matthew 1,6) the earliest surviving representation of this motif in stained glass, dating to 1145. It post-dates Suger's Stirps Jessein the stained glass of the chevet of Saint-Denis, named after the first words of the responsorial hymn by Fulbert of Chartres for the Feast of the Virgin Mary (Note: In full - Stirps Jesse virgam produxit, virgaque florem Et super hanc florem requiescit Spiritus almus Virgo Dei genitrix virga est, Flos filius ejus.)., but the latter has been heavily restored.

The rose window was made sixty years later, in 1215, after the 1195 fire, with the new cathedral's nave higher. Its centre shows Christ the Judge showing his windows, angels and the four beasts from the Book of Revelation. Above are Abraham and the Elect, whilst below are souls being weighed and the twelve apostles.

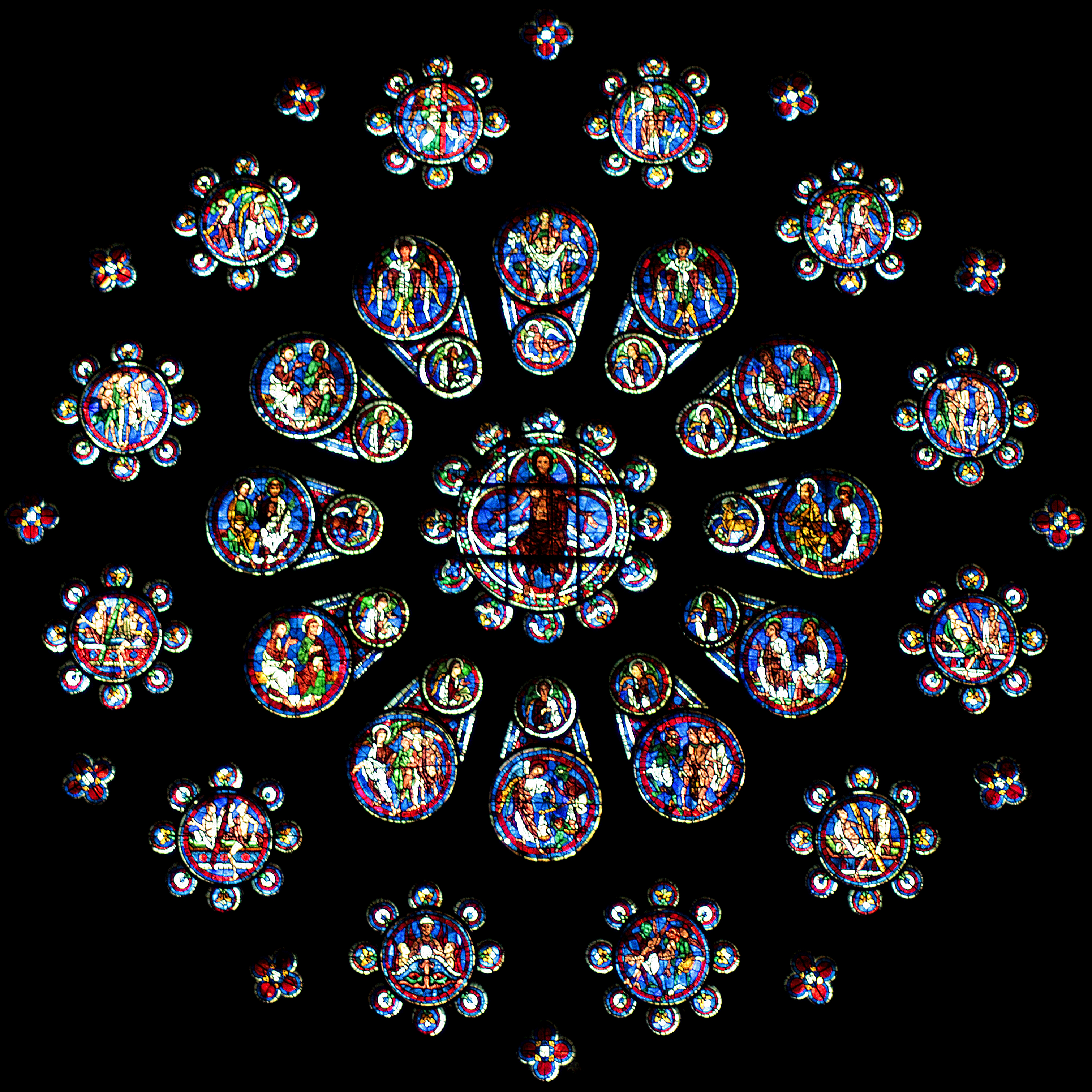

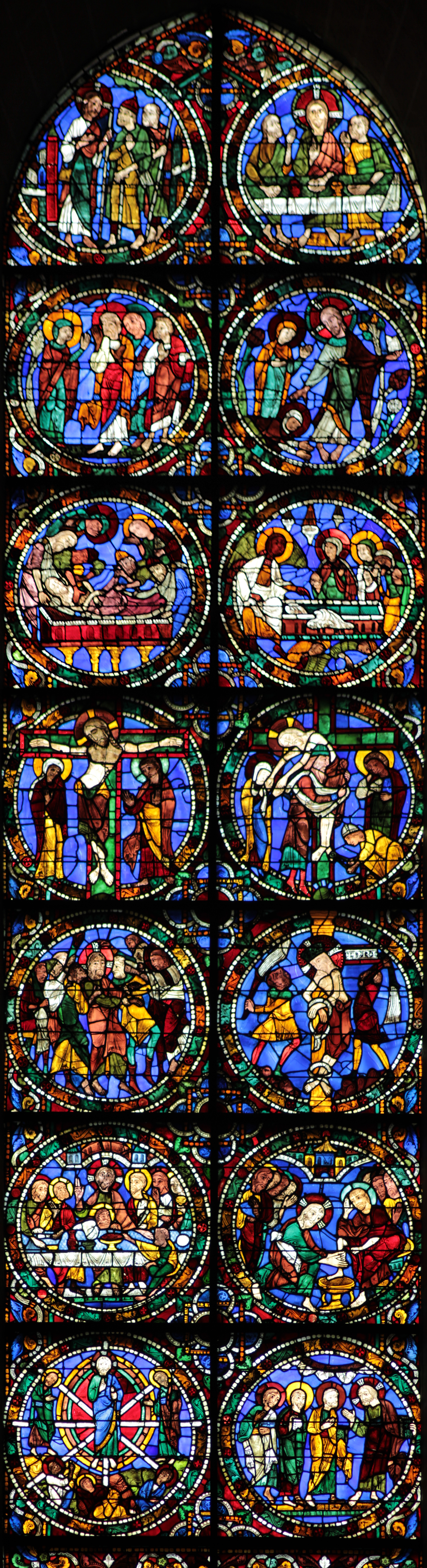

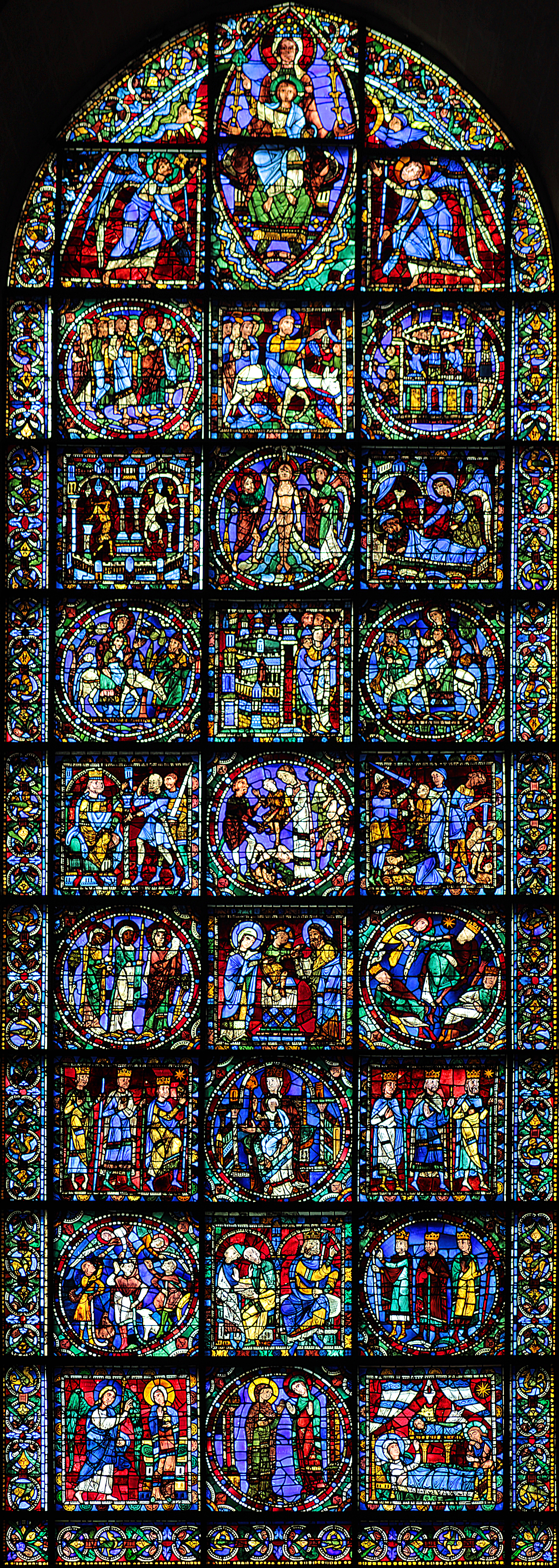

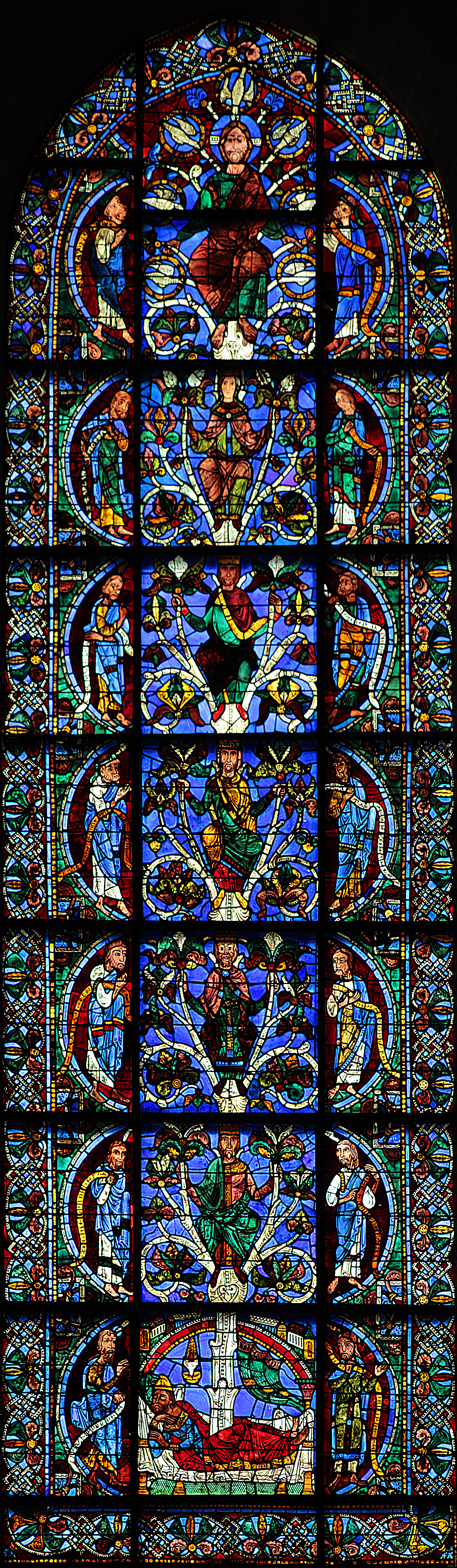

Click on images to enlarge

=== South (bay 122) ===
Offered by the Dreux Bretagne family, which included Pierre Mauclerc, it was made between 1221 and 1230. It is made up of five lancets below a large rose window formed of a twelve-lobe eye, then twelve sections made up of medallions, then twelve circles, then twelve quatrefoils and finally twelve semi-circles bearing medallions

Bay number	Name	Donors	Dates	Base Palissy	Wikimedia Commons
122	Dreux Bretagne Family Window	Pierre Mauclerc, Alix de Thouars	1221-1230	Base Palissy: PM28000814, Ministère français de la Culture. (in French)	Media related to Bay 122 at Wikimedia Commons

==== Lancets ====
The central lancet shows the Madonna holding the Christ Child in her arms, flanked symmetrically by the four evangelists (left to right Luke, Matthew, John and Mark) sitting on the shoulders of the major Old Testament prophets (left to right Jeremiah, Isaiah, Ezekiel and Daniel), recalling a famous image by Bernard of Chartres, master and chancellor of the School of Chartres, handed down by John of Salisbury in colophon 400 of his Metalogicon - "Bernard of Chartres said that we are like dwarves perched on the shoulders of giants, and we can see better and further than them not because our sight is more piercing or our size is larger, but because we are raised into the air and carried up into the air thanks to their gigantic height". (Note: Dicebat Bernardus Carnotensis nos esse quasi nanos, gigantium humeris incidentes, ut possimus, plura eis et remotiora videre, non utique proprii visus acumine, aut eminentia corporis, sed quia in altum subvehimur et extollimur magnitudine gigantea.)

Below the Virgin Mary are figures of Pierre of Dreux or Pierre Mauclerc and Alix of Thouars, along with the coats of arms of the counts of Dreux on the left (to the left below Jeremiah) and representations their daughter Yolande of Brittany (below Ezekiel) and their eldest son Jean le Roux (born in 1217).

==== Rose window ====
This illustrates the first vision in the Book of Revelation (4, 1-11) of a figure with a face of jaspar and sardonyx sitting on throne in heaven, surrounded by a rainbow like emerald, twenty-four elders in white robes and golden crowns and four living creatures, with seven lamps before the throne. At the window's centre is Christ in Majesty, whilst running clockwise from bottom left the first circle shows the four living creatures of a lion, a bull, a man and an eagle, also seen as symbols of the Four Evangelists. The other windows show censing angels. The next two circles show the twenty-four elders, with quatrefoils with the Dreux family coat of arms between these two circles.

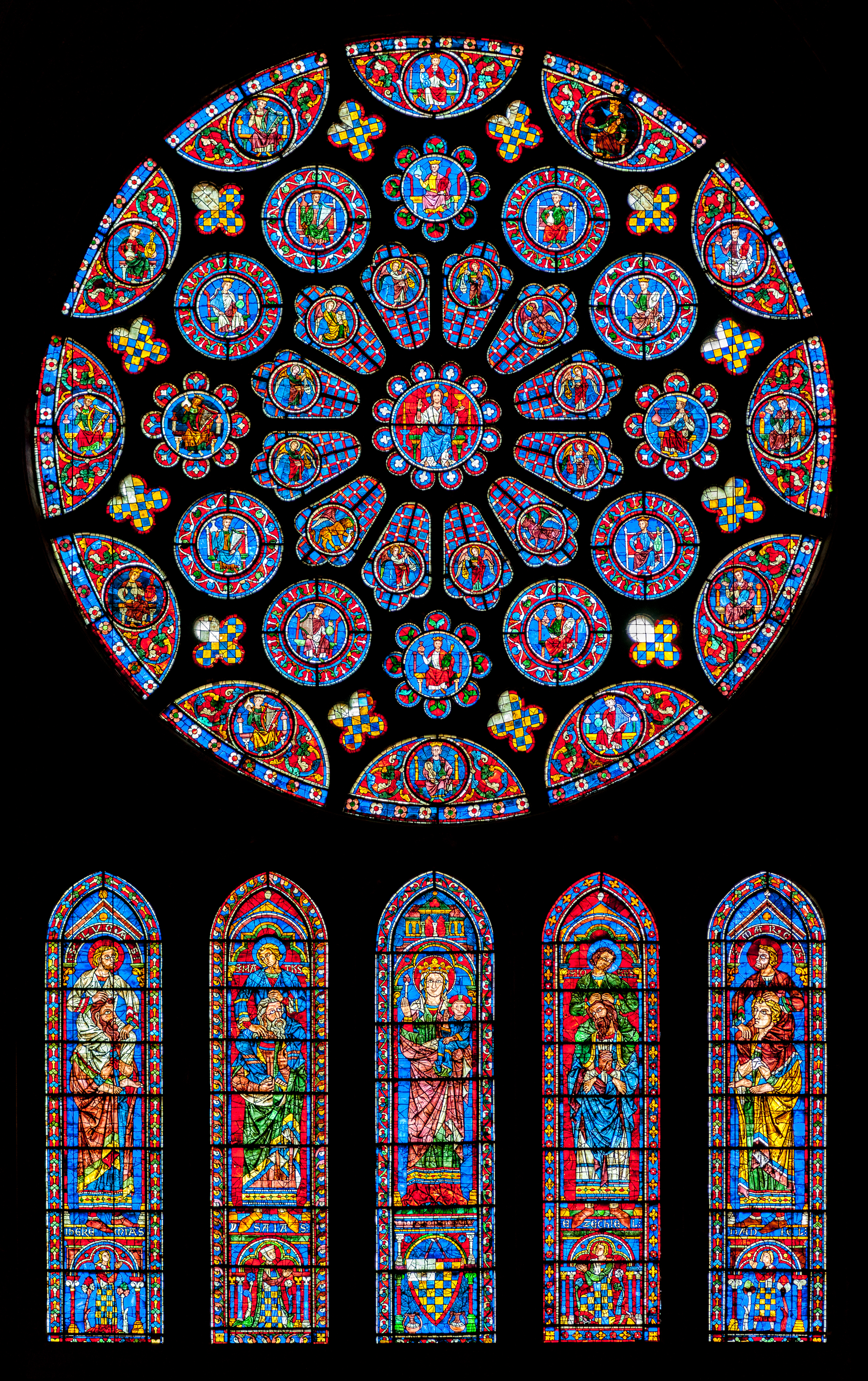
Bay 122
Rose window and lancets of the south transept

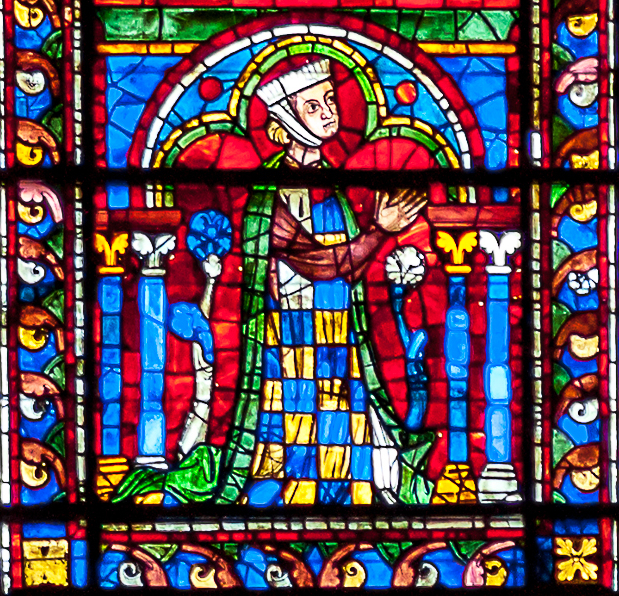
Bay 122, lancet
Alix of Touars

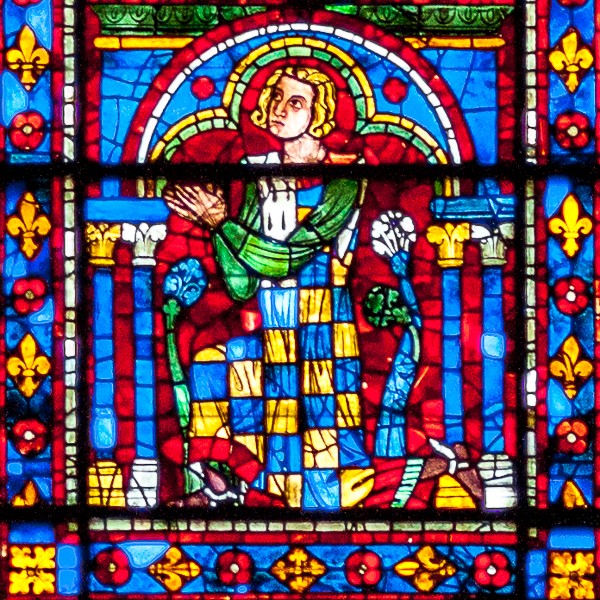
Bay 122, lancet
Pierre Mauclerc

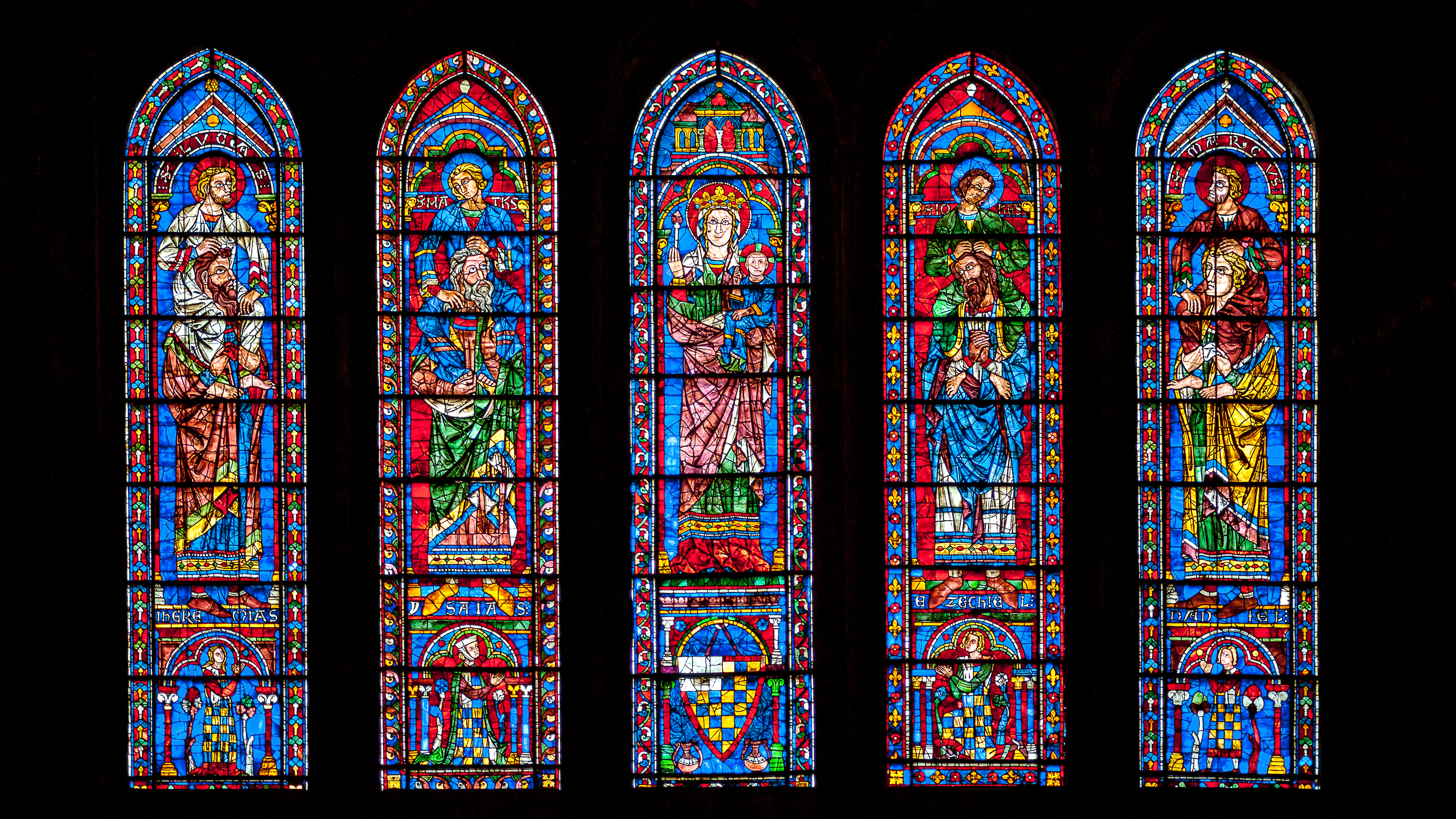
Bay 122
Lancets of the main facade of the south transept

=== North (Bay 121) ===
It is also known as the "House of France Window", since it was funded by Louis IX of France and his mother Blanche of Castile in 1230. It is made up of five lancets below a large rose window, whose lower corners are framed on each side by four small lancets. The rose is made up of a twelve-lobe central eye, then twelve medallion sections, then twelve square, then twelve quatrefoils and finally twelve semi-circular medallions.

Bay Number	Name	Donors	Dates	Base Palissy	Wikimedia Commons
121	House of France Window	Saint Louis and Blanche of Castile	1230	Base Palissy: IM28000460, Ministère français de la Culture. (in French)	Media related to Bay 121 at Wikimedia Commons

==== Lancets ====
The leftmost lancet shows the king-priest Melchizedek above Nebuchadnezzar, the latter adoring an idol. The next lancet shows King David holding a harp above Saul throwing himself on his own sword, the latter symbolising the sin of anger, whilst the following lancet shows the Virgin Mary in the arms of Saint Anne, with the French royal coat of arms below. The fourth lancet shows King Solomon above Jeroboam, the latter adoring a golden calf, whilst the final lancet shows the high priest Aaron above Pharaoh and his army drowning in the Red Sea.

==== Rose ====
At the centre is a Madonna and Child, surrounded by concentric circles. The inner one shows four doves (symbolising the gifts of the Holy Spirit), censing angels, candle-bearing angels and cherubim. The second circle is made of lozenges showing the lineage of the Kings of Judah from the Gospel of Matthew. (Note: David begat Solomon by Bathsheba; Solomon begat Roboam; Roboam begat Abia; Abia begat Asa; Asa begat Josaphat; Josaphat begat Joram; Joram begat Ozias; Ozias begat Joatham; Joatham begat Achaz; Achaz begat Ézéchias; Ézéchias begat Manassé... Matthew 1,6-10) The third and final circle shows the twelve minor prophets of the Old Testament. Between the second and third circles are quatrefoils with the coat of arms of the kingdom of France.

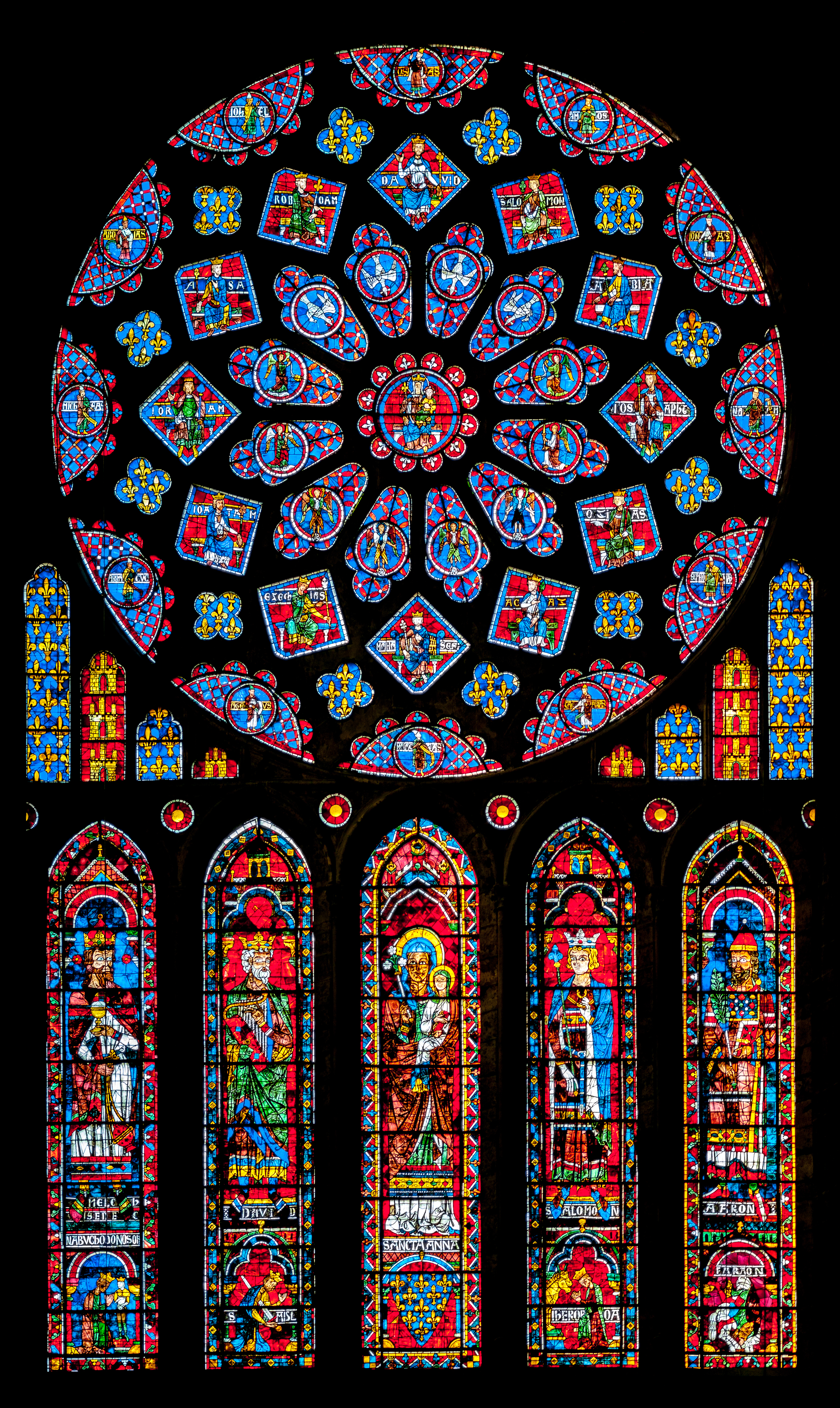
Bay 121
North transept facade

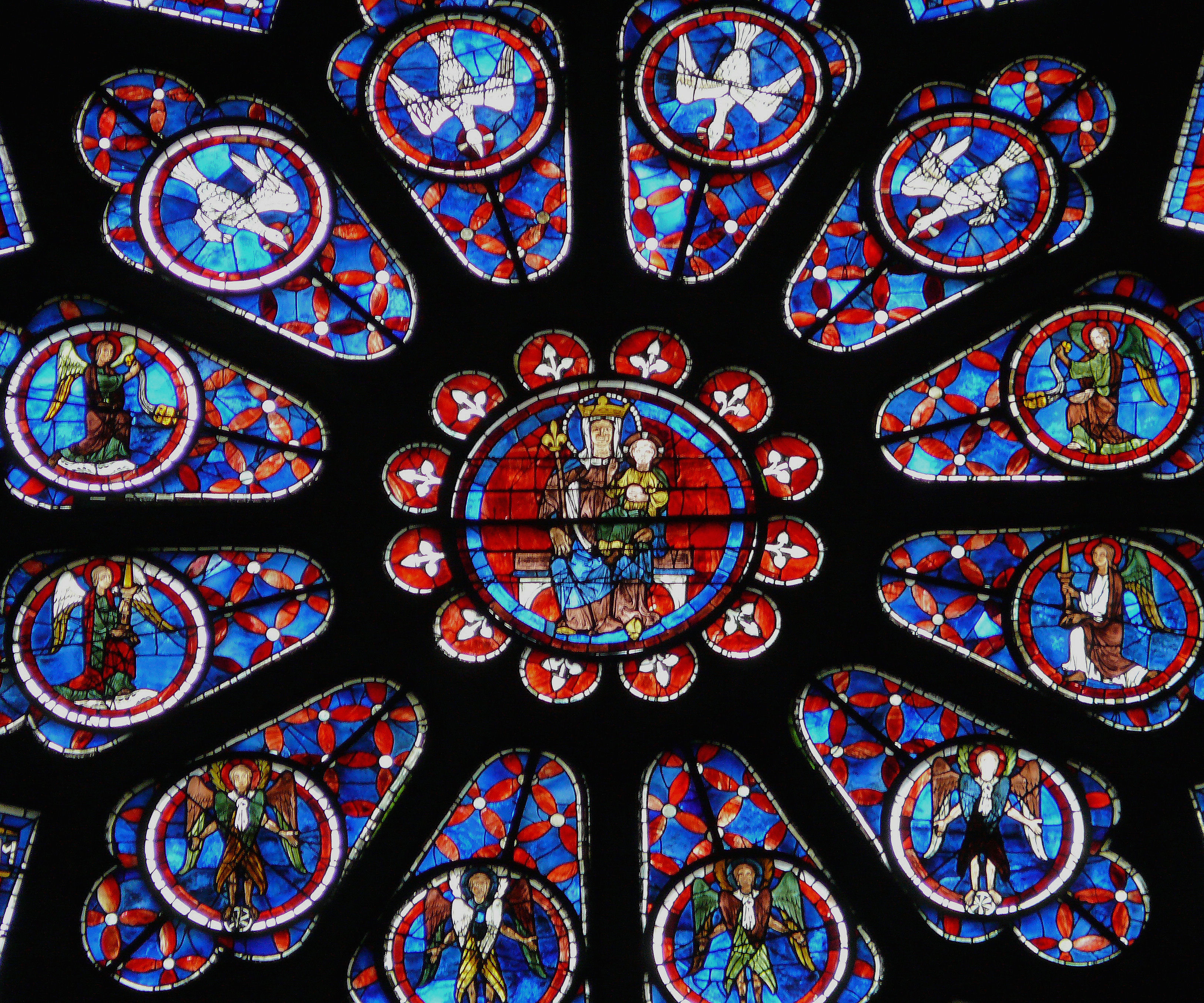
Bay 121
Rose (detail)

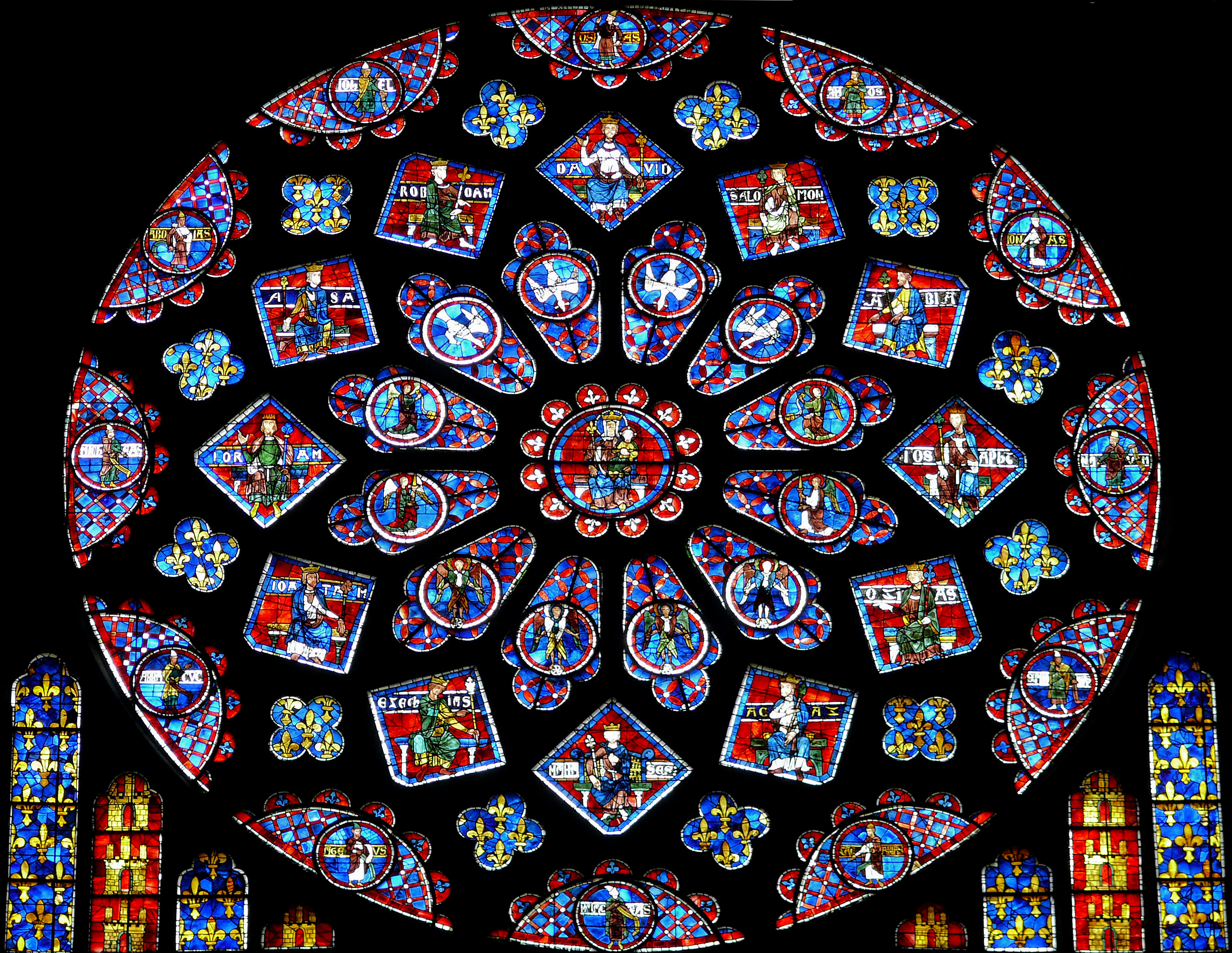
Bay 121
Rose

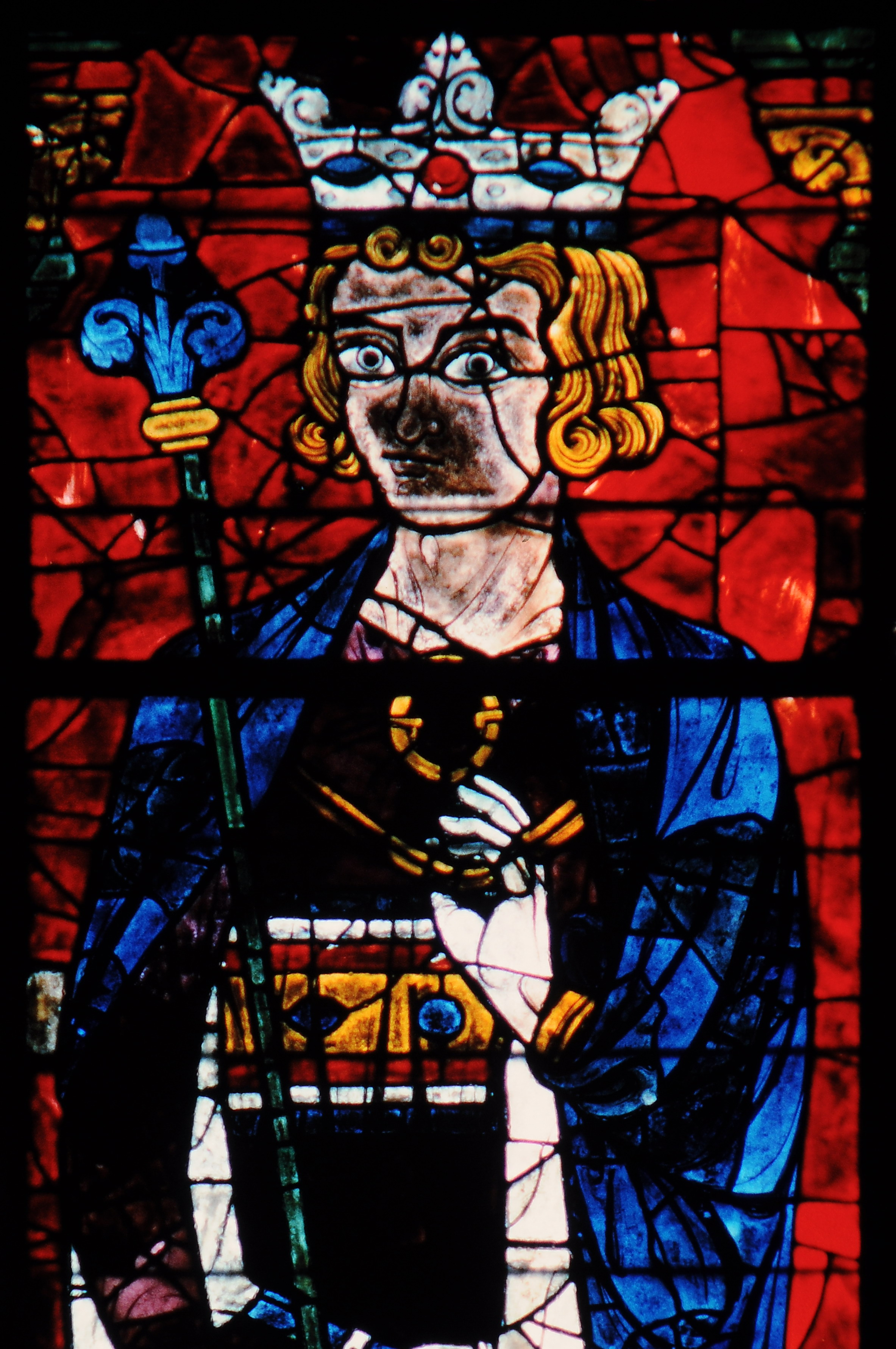
Bay 121, lancet
Solomon

== Lower windows ==
There are 52 lower windows (0 to 51). At the north and south ends of the ambulatory, six of them are made up of two lancets each under a rose window, bringing the total number of windows up to 64.

=== Story windows ===
Unlike the upper windows showing large full-length images of major figures, the lower windows are meant to be seen close-up. Made up of successive panels, generally reading bottom to top and left to right, they show narratives from the Bible, the apocrypha and lives of the saints, many also appearing in the Golden Legend, written fifty years after the windows were made. They are sometimes known as "legendaries" ("légendaires" in French), meaning "things which must be read". They formed a true visual catechism and preachers would instruct pilgrims to look at these illustrations.

=== South of the nave ===
Nave - south side

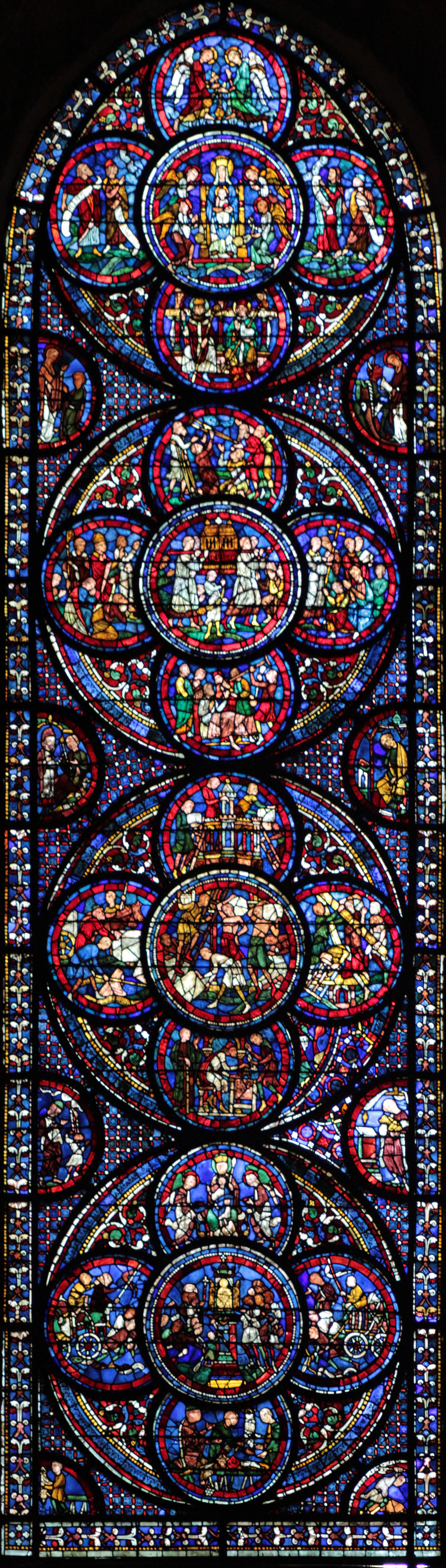
Bay 38
Miracles of Our Lady

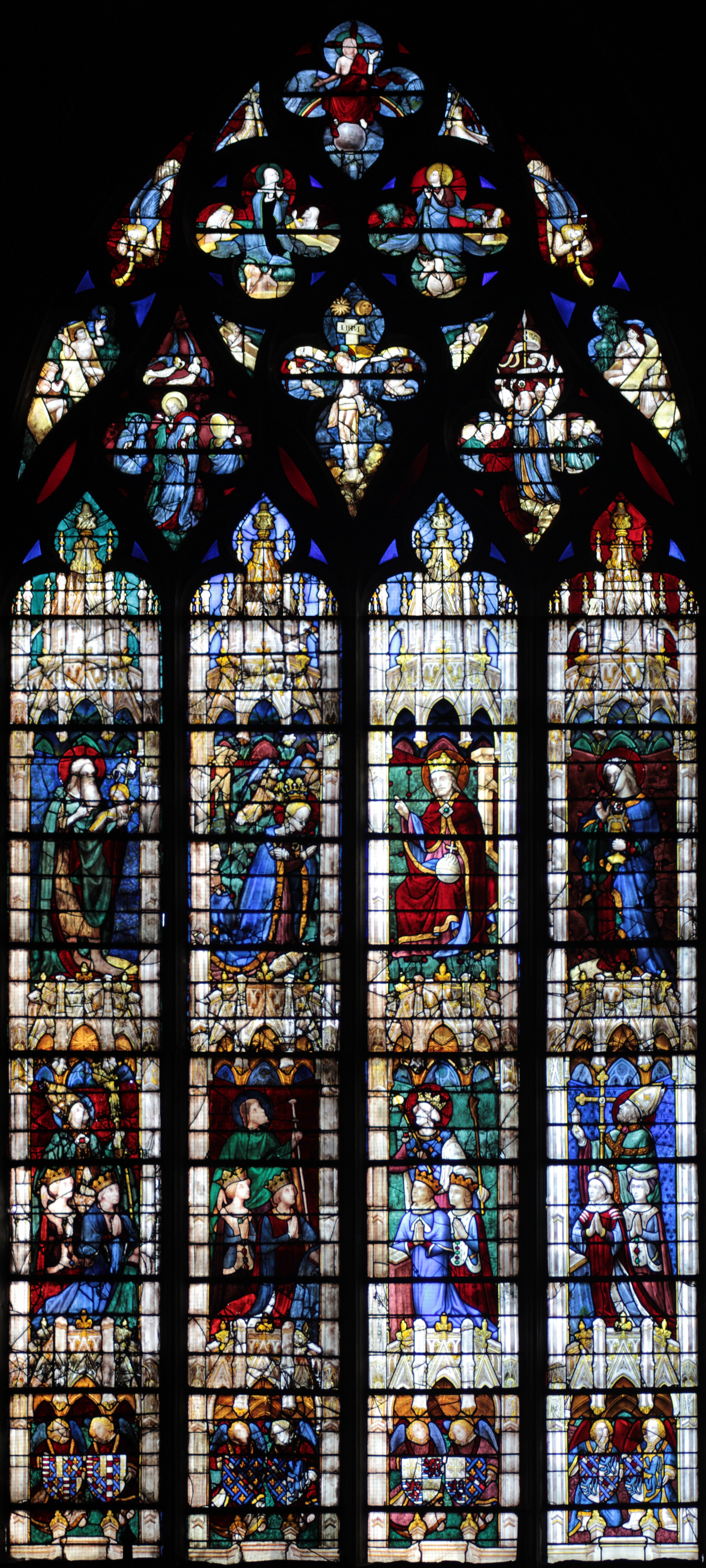
Bay 40
Vendôme Chapel

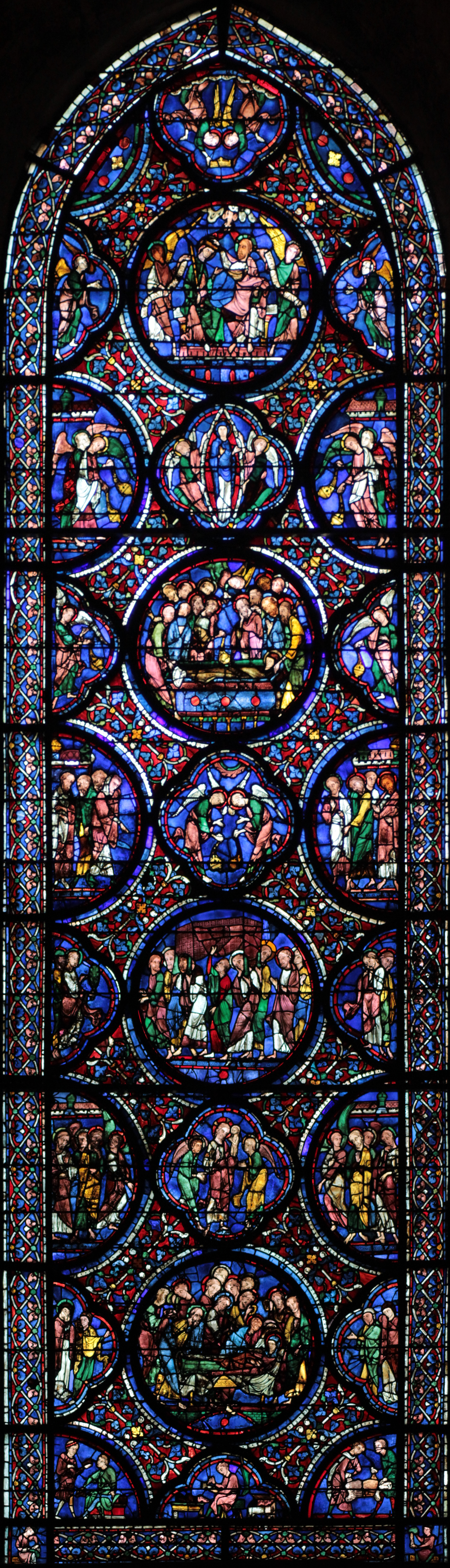
Bay 42
Death, Burial and Assumption of the Virgin

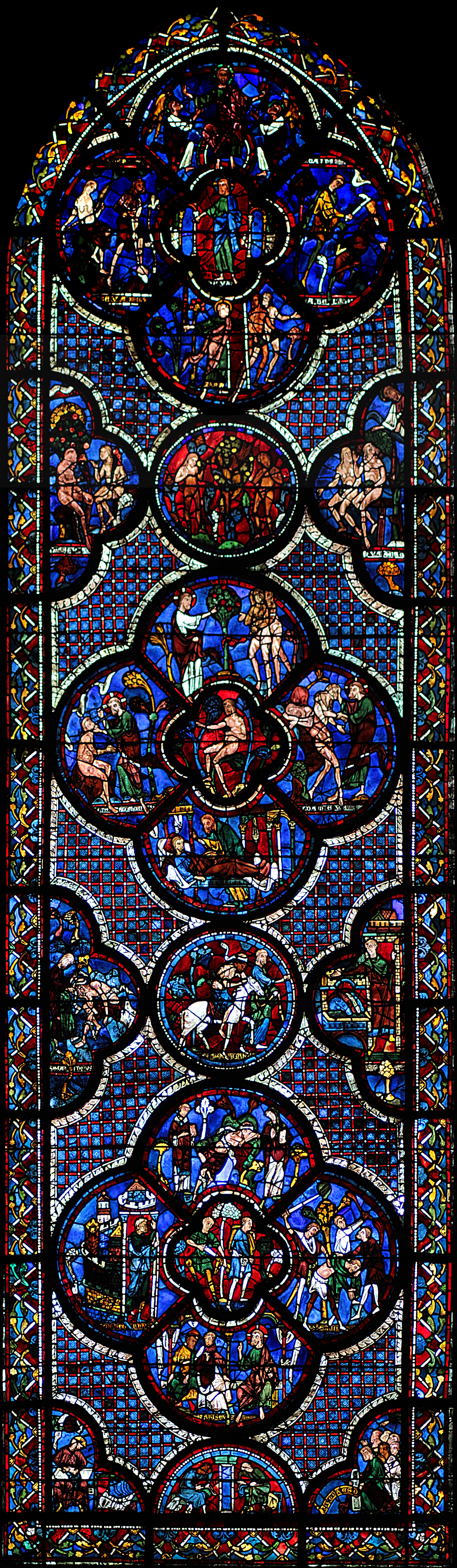
Bay 44
Parable of the Good Samaritan

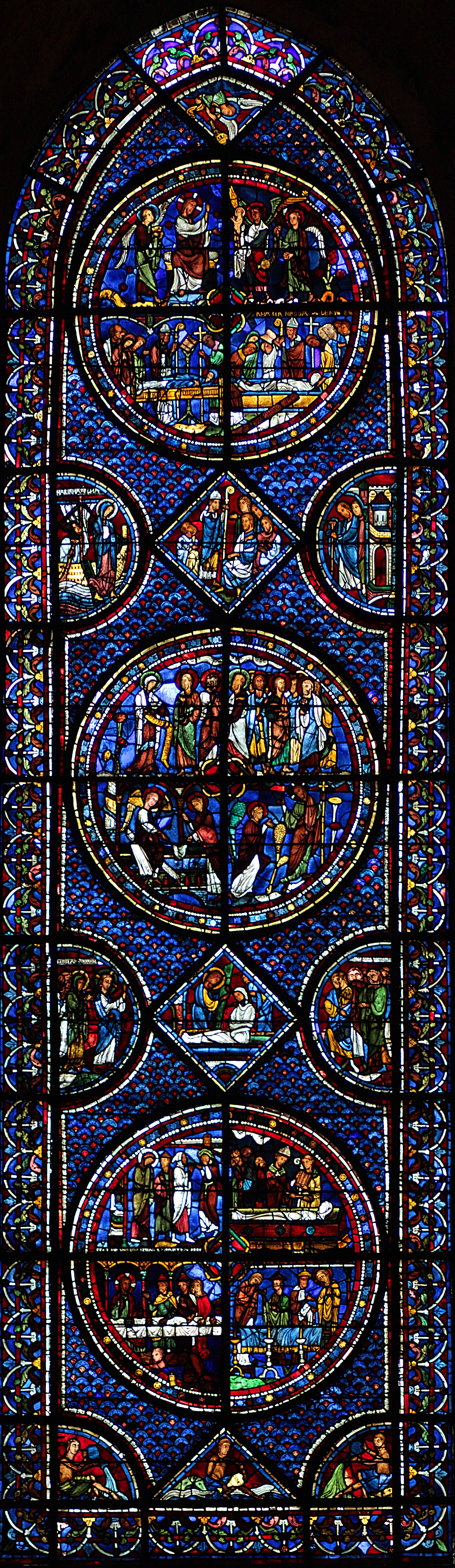
Bay 46
Life of St Mary Magdalene

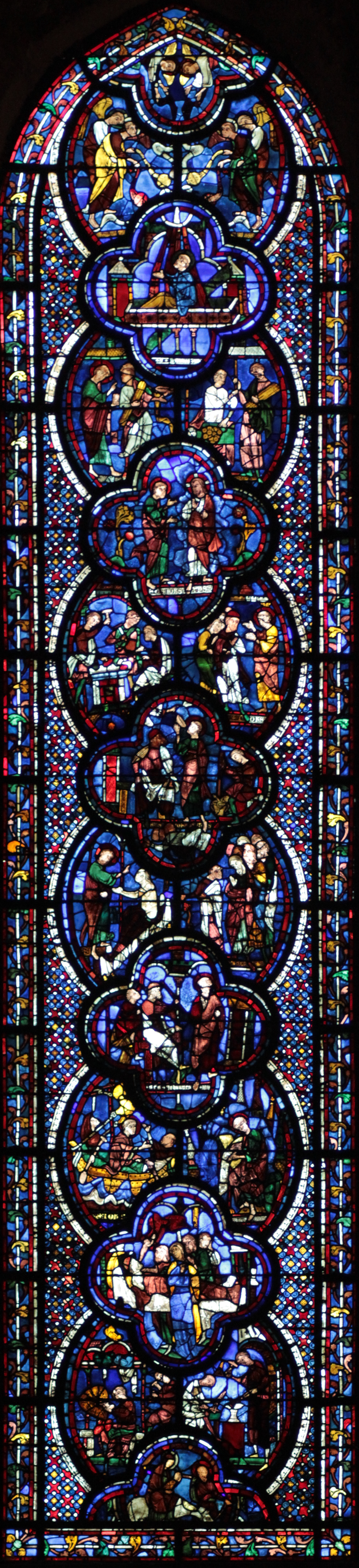
Bay 48
St John the Evangelist Window

48 - Life of St John the Evangelist

Draws on the 2nd century traditional legends on the saint's miracles and death, later compiled into Jacobus de Voragine's Golden Legend. Armourers guild, 1205–1215.

46 - Life of St Mary Magdalene

Combines tales of Mary Magdalene's preaching, the evangelisation of Provence and the legend of her death. Water-carriers guild, 1205–1215.

44 - Parable of the Good Samaritan

Placed in parallel with the Fall from the Book of Genesis. Shoemakers guild, 1205–1215.

42 - Death and Assumption of the Virgin

Shows the apostles at the Death, the miracles associated with his burial and her Assumption. Shoemakers guild, 1205–1215.

40 - Vendôme Family

In the 15th century Flamboyant Gothic style in contrast to the 13th-century Primitive Gothic of the rest of the nave, the bay shows (left to right) the donor, his sister, their father and the donor's brother, kneeling with their spouses. The tympanum is a Last Judgement scene.

Donor Louis, Count of Vendôme, 1417.

38 - Miracles of Our Lady

Shows pilgrimage to Chartres, the cathedral's construction and some of the miracles of Our Lady of Chartres. The lower circle underlines the appeal to the pilgrims' generosity to fund the project. Butchers guild, 1205–1215.

=== South transept ===
The south transept is made up of three bays, each consisting of a lancet. Two face west and one east due to the presence of the double ambulatory.

Funded by American architects, bay 32 dates to 1954, whilst bay 34 is made up of late 15th and early 16th century fragments and bay 36 is 12th–13th century but is not in its original position.

South Transept Windows

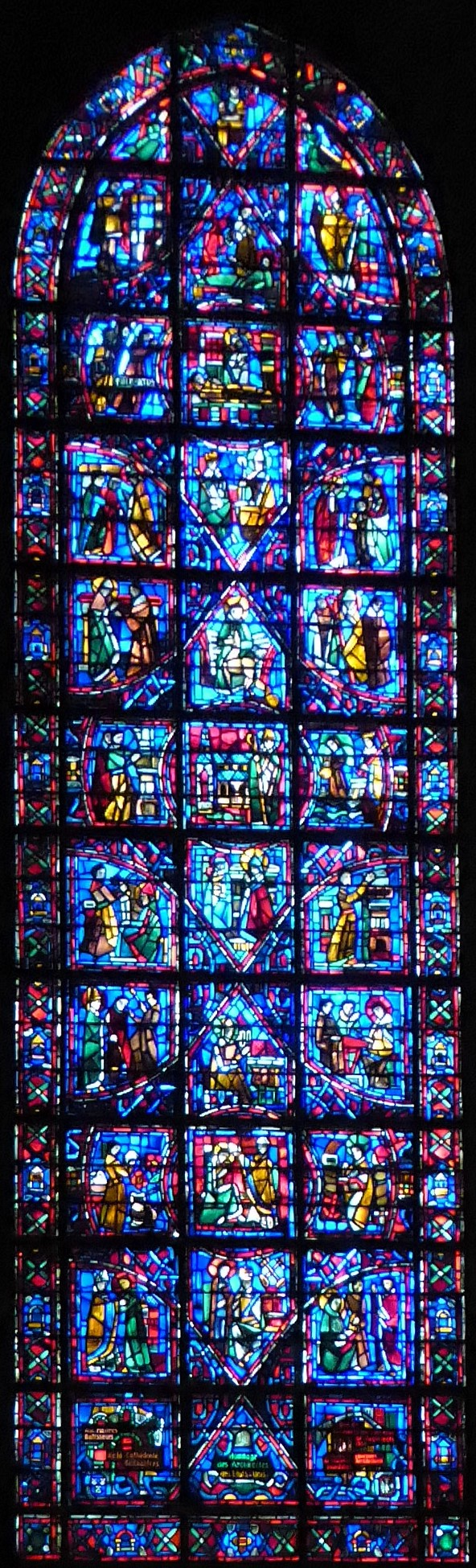
Bay 32
Life of Saint Fulbert

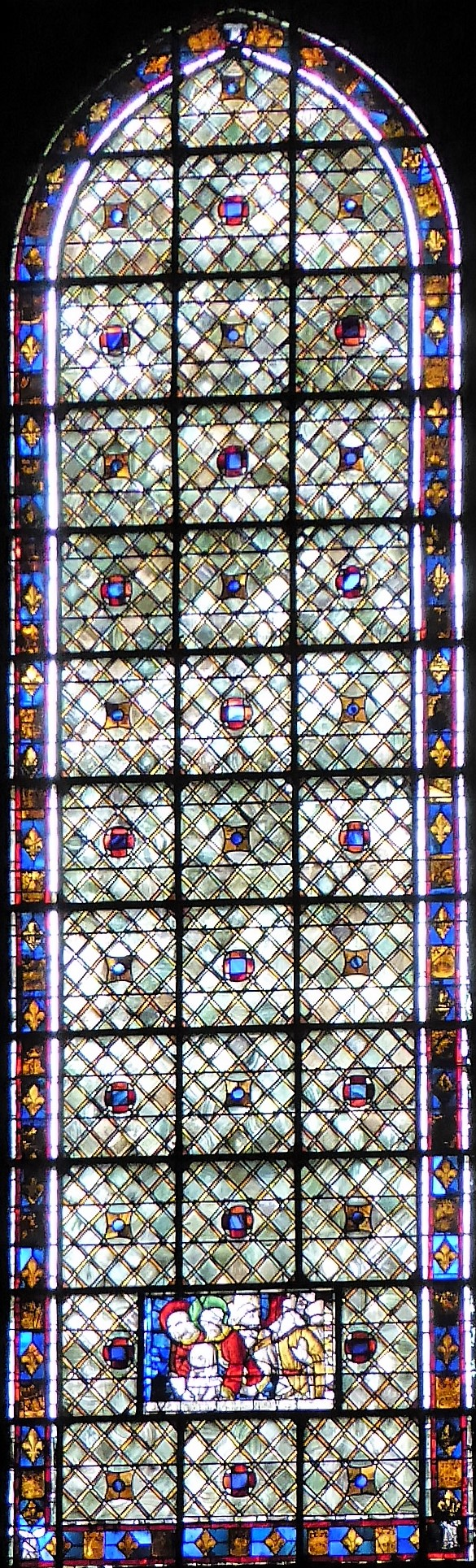
Bay 34
Fragments of a Resurrection of Lazarus, grisaille

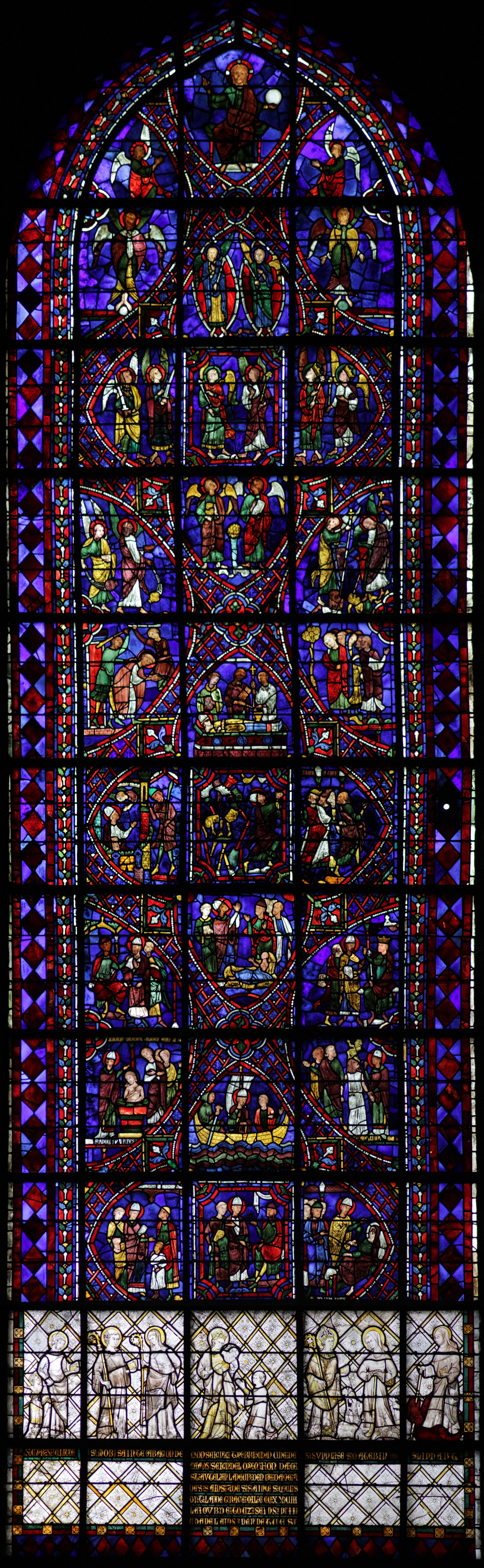
Bay 36
Life of Saint Apollinarius

Bay	Title	Donors	Dates	Base Palissy	Wikimedia Commons
36	Life of Saint Apollinarius	Thierry, a canon	1205-1215; 1328 panels added to base, heavily restored by Gaudin in 1908, then by others in 1909	Base Palissy: PM28000810, Ministère français de la Culture. (in French); Base Palissy: IM28000468, Ministère français de la Culture. (in French)	Media related to Bay 36 at Wikimedia Commons
34	Fragments of a Resurrection of Lazarus; Grisaille with a border of crowns and fleurs de lys	"Donated around 1840 by Monsieur Dugué, a landowner at Mainvilliers who had acquired the window in Paris" (translation of an inscription on the window	Late 15th or early 16th century 1924 grisaille by C. Lorin	Base Palissy: PM28000807, Ministère français de la Culture. (in French); Base Palissy: IM28000466, Ministère français de la Culture. (in French)	Media related to Bay 34 at Wikimedia Commons
32	Life of Saint Fulbert	American architects	1954, designed by F. Lorin	Base Palissy: PM28000807, Ministère français de la Culture. (in French)	Media related to Bay 32 at Wikimedia Commons

=== Ambulatory ===
==== South ambulatory (30-26) ====
Chartres' windows are celebrated for their cobalt blue, known as "Chartres blue" or "Romanesque blue", which first emerged in the workshops at Saint-Denis Basilica in the 1140s and was also used at Le Mans Cathedral. With a sodium base coloured with cobalt, it is the more resistant than reds and greens of the same era.

"Notre-Dame de la Belle-Verrière", one of 75 representations of the Virgin Mary in Chartres Cathedral, owes its fame to this exceptional cobalt blue. It was almost lost in the 1194 fire, with only its central panel of the Madonna and Child and the three windows over the main door surviving.

South Ambulatory

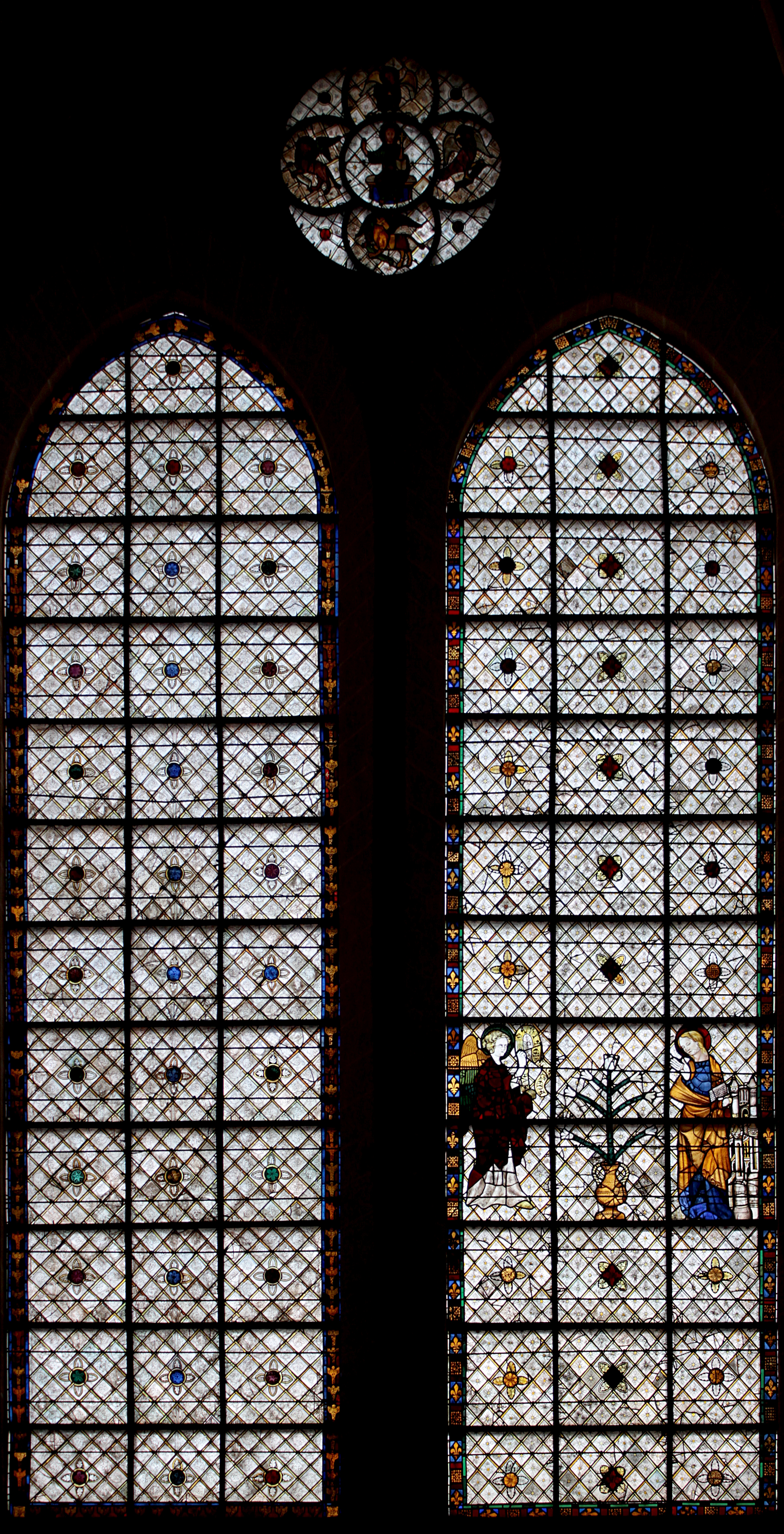
Bay 26
Annunciation

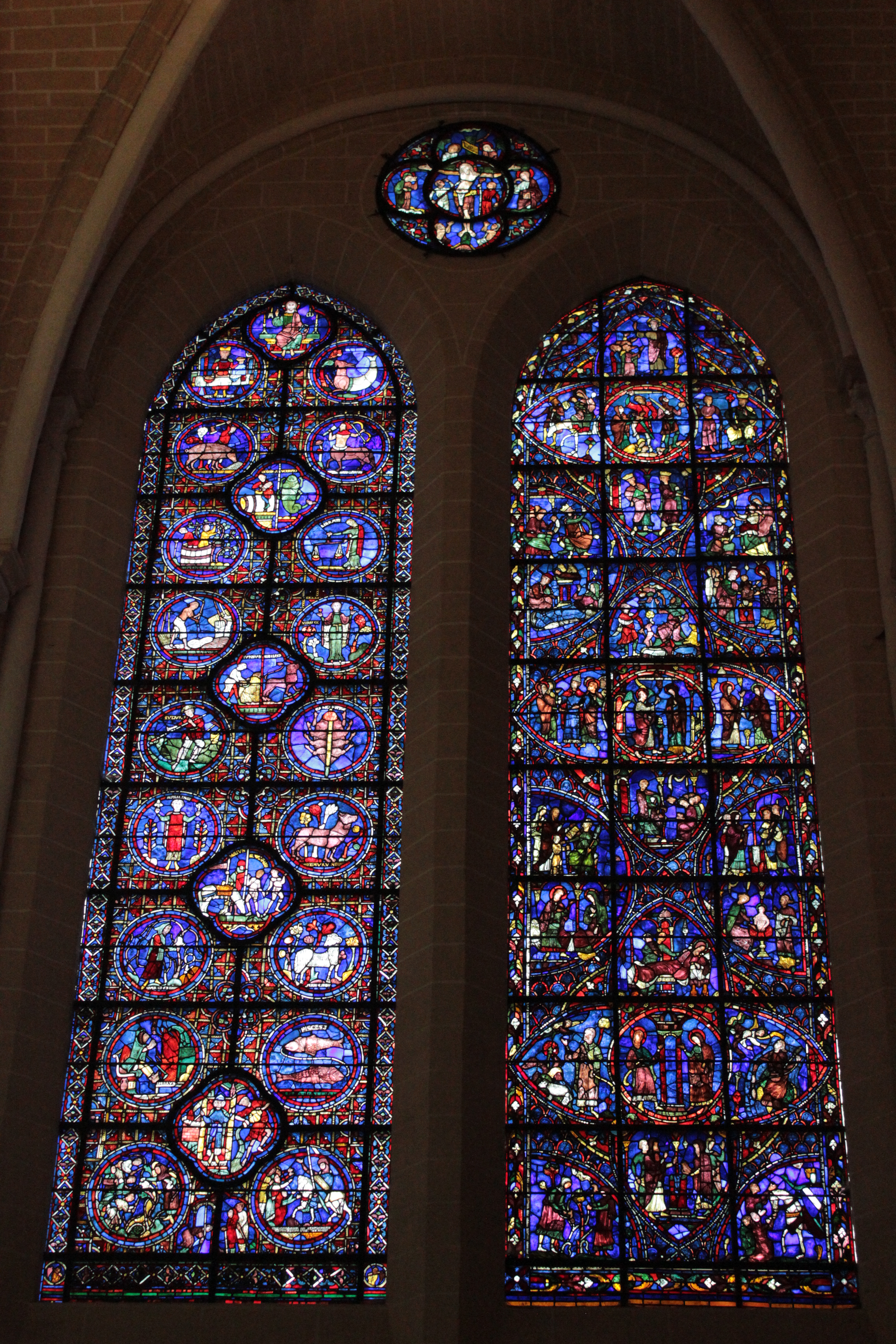
Bay 28
Zodiac and Life of the Virgin

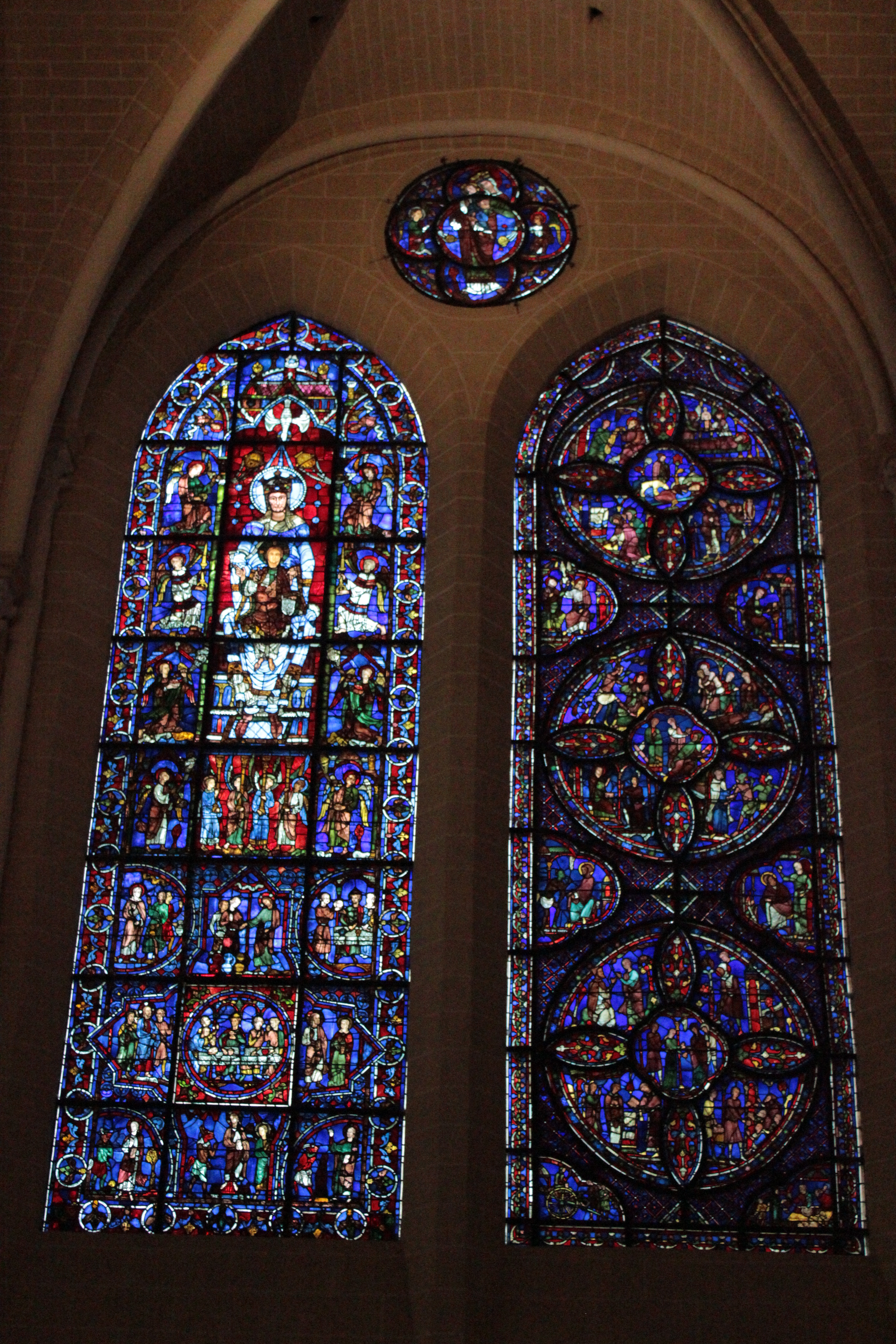
Bay 30
Notre-Dame de la Belle-Verrière and Lives of Saint Anthony and Saint Paul

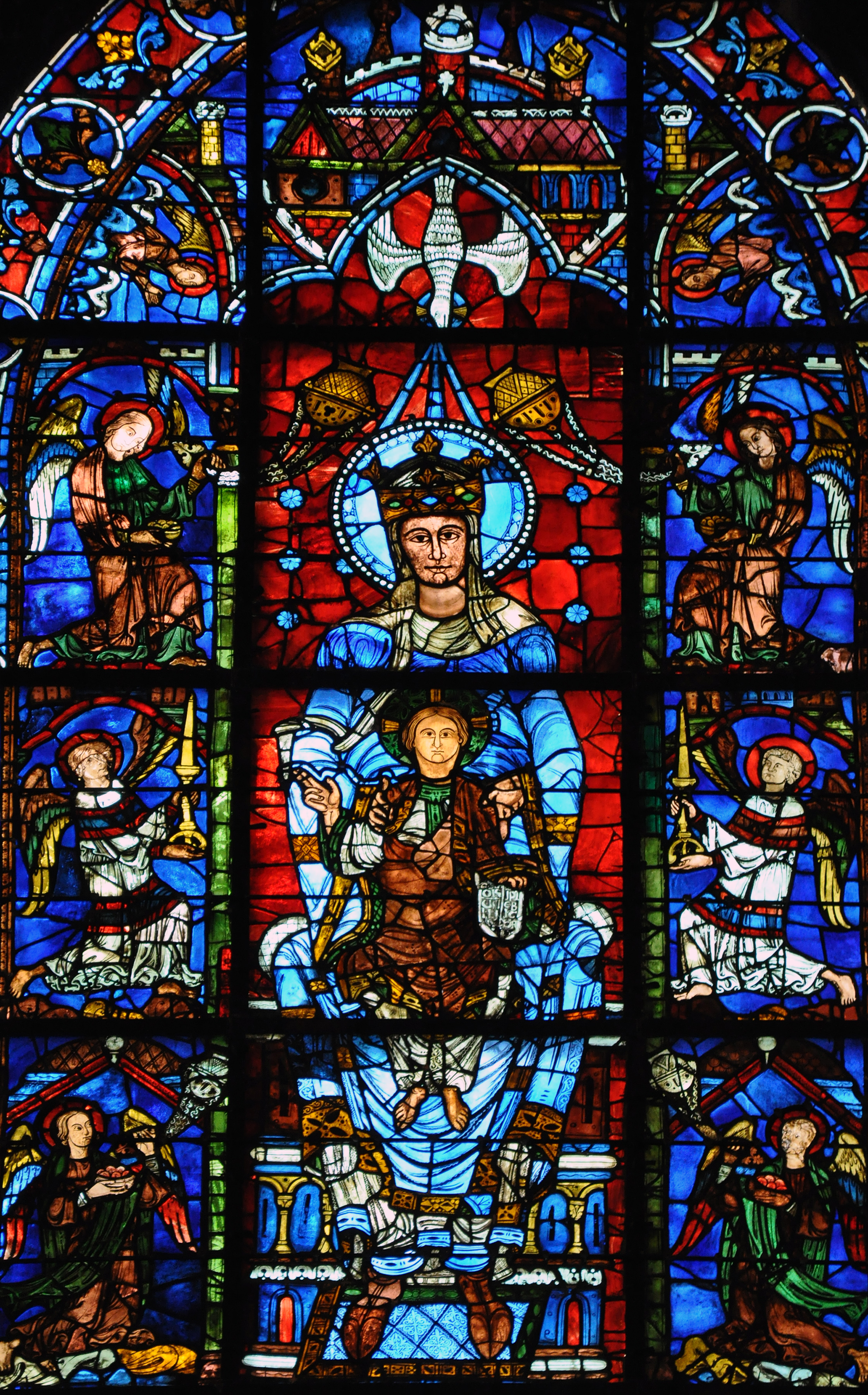
Bay 30
Notre-Dame de la Belle Verrière, detail

	South Ambulatory				
30	2 lancets Left: Notre-Dame de la Belle-Verrière; Right: Life of Saint Anthony and Saint Paul; Oculus: Nursing Virgin	- Les poissonniers	1180; 1215–1220; Restored in the 20th century by Gaudin and Michel Petit	Base Palissy: IM28000465, Ministère français de la Culture. (in French)	Media related to Bay 30 (left) at Wikimedia Commons; Media related to Bay 30 (right) at Wikimedia Commons
28	2 lancettes À gauche: Zodiaque et Travaux des mois A droite: Vie de la Vierge; Oculus: Christ bénissant, Alpha et Omega	Theobald VI, count of Chartres; Les vignerons	1217–1220; Restored in the 20th century by Gaudin and Jean Mauret	Base Palissy: IM28000515, Ministère français de la Culture. (in French)	Media related to Zodiac at Wikimedia Commons; Media related to Bay 28 (right) at Wikimedia Commons
26	Verrière de l'Annonciation: 2 lancettes en grisaille Oculus: le Christ bénissant et trônant	-	13th century Restored in the 20th century by C. Lorin and Gaudin	Base Palissy: PM28000821, Ministère français de la Culture. (in French)	Media related to Bay 26 at Wikimedia Commons

==== All Saints Chapel (24-20) ====
All Saints' Chapel

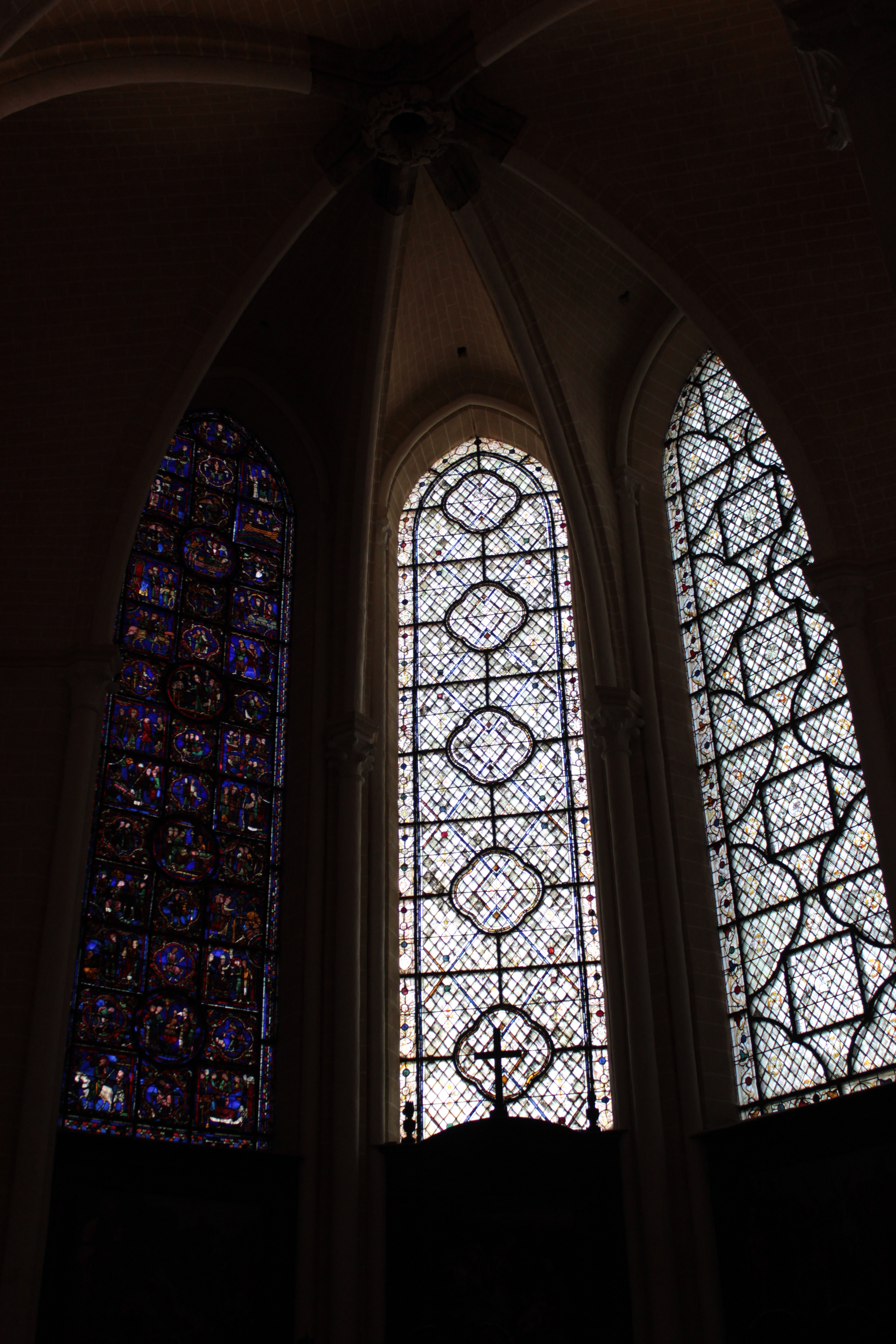
All Saints Chapel
Bays 20, 22 and 24 (left to right)

Bay	Location or title	Donors	Dates	Base Palissy	Wikimedia Commons
	All Saints Chapel				Media related to All Saints Chapel at Wikimedia Commons
24	Grisaille	-	16th century with 13th century elements Heavily restored in 1961 by Lorin	Base Palissy: PM28000820, Ministère français de la Culture. (in French)	Media related to Bay 24 at Wikimedia Commons
22	Grisaille	-	16th century with 13th century elements Heavily restored in 1961 by Lorin	Base Palissy: PM28000820, Ministère français de la Culture. (in French)	Media related to Bay 22 at Wikimedia Commons
20	Life of Saint Martin	Curriers	1215–1225	Base Palissy: IM28000392, Ministère français de la Culture. (in French)	Media related to Bay 20 at Wikimedia Commons

==== Confessors' Chapel (18-10) ====
Confessors' Chapel

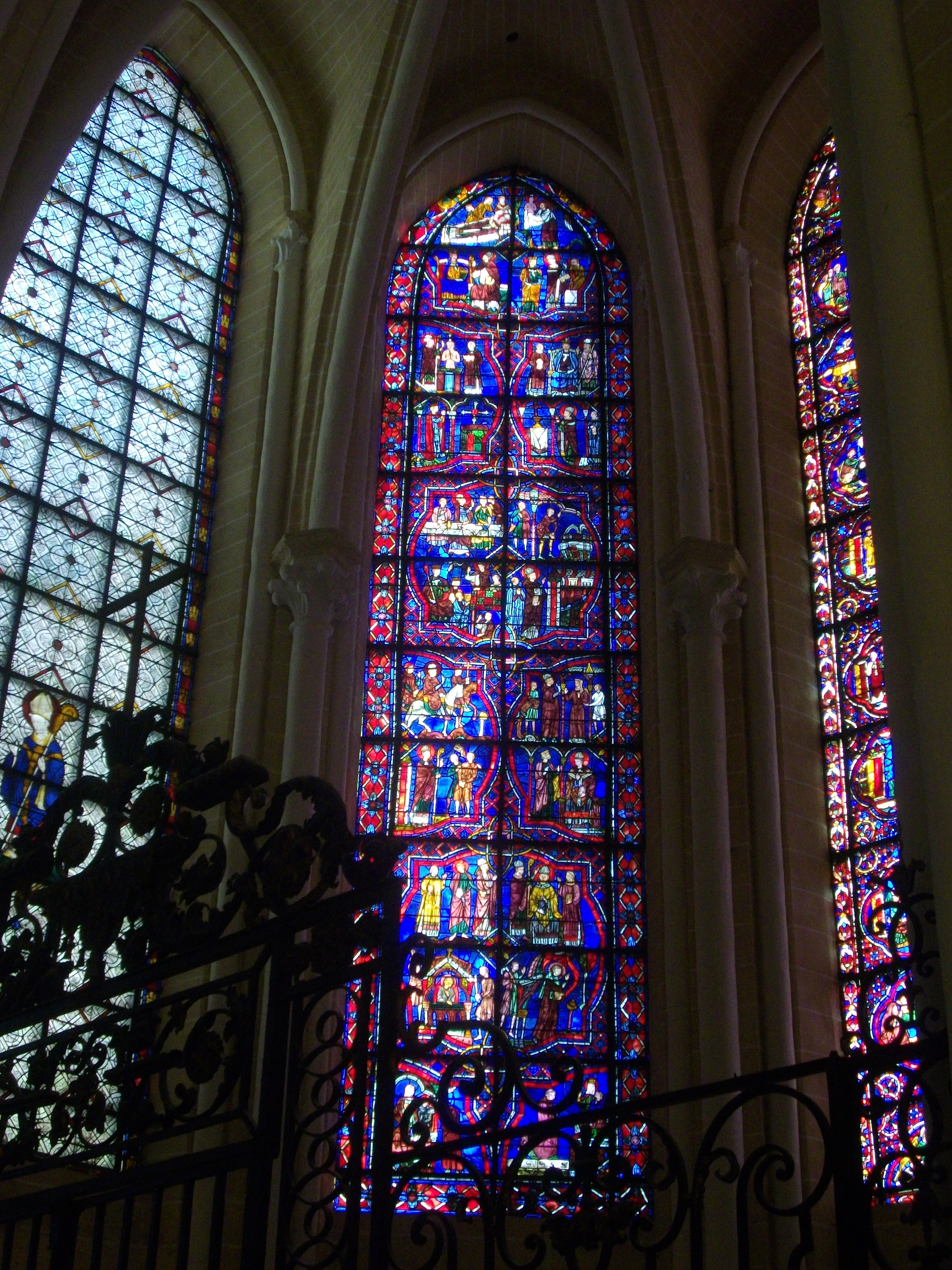
Bays 10 and 12
Grisaille and Saint Remigius

Bay 12
Saint Remigius

Bay 14
Saint Nicholas

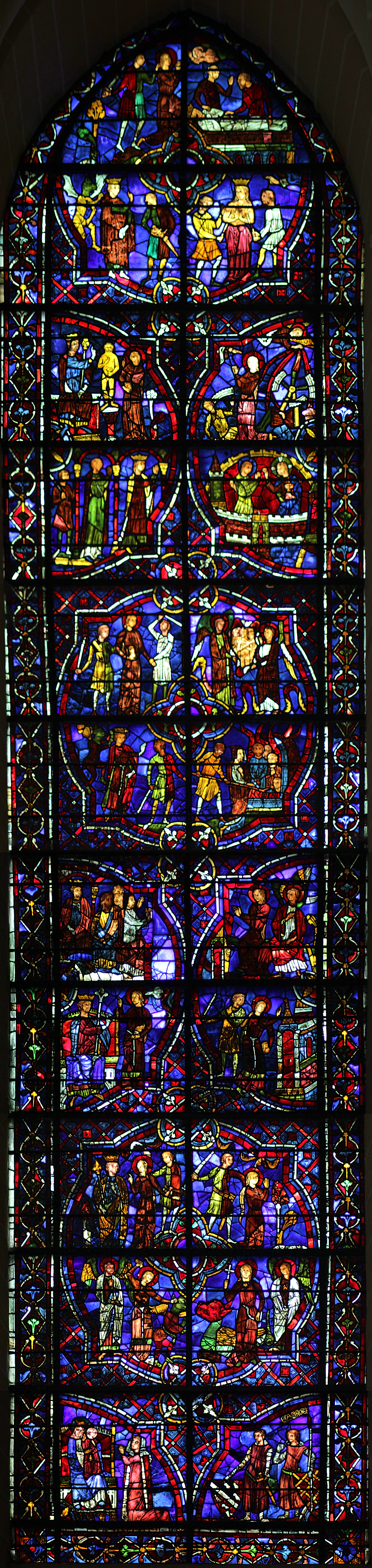
Bay 16
Saint Margaret and Saint Catherine

Bay 18
Saint Thomas Becket

Bay	Location or title	Donors	Dates	Base Palissy	Wikimedia Commons
	Confessors' Chapel (apsidal or radiating chapel)				Media related to Confessors' Chapel at Wikimedia Commons
18	Life of Saint Thomas Becket	Tanners	1215–1225; Restored by Gaudin in 1921, restored again by Lorin in 1996	Base Palissy: IM28000393, Ministère français de la Culture. (in French)	Media related to Bay 18 at Wikimedia Commons
16	Life of Saint Margaret; Life of Saint Catherine	-	1210–1225	Base Palissy: PM28000818, Ministère français de la Culture. (in French)	Media related to Bay 16 at Wikimedia Commons
14	Life and Miracles of Saint Nicholas	-	1215–1225; 5 lower panels destroyed in 1791, replaced by Lorin in 1924	Base Palissy: IM28000470, Ministère français de la Culture. (in French)	Media related to Bay 14 at Wikimedia Commons
12	Life of Saint Remigius	-	1210–1225	Base Palissy: PM28000818, Ministère français de la Culture. (in French)	Media related to Bay 12 at Wikimedia Commons
10	Grisaille	-	13th century Restored in 1417 by Jean Périer with addition of Saint Nicholas Resurrecting Three Children	Base Palissy: IM28000518, Ministère français de la Culture. (in French)	Media related to Bay 10 at Wikimedia Commons

==== Entrance to the Saint Piatus Chapel (8-6) ====
Entrance to the Saint Piatus Chapel

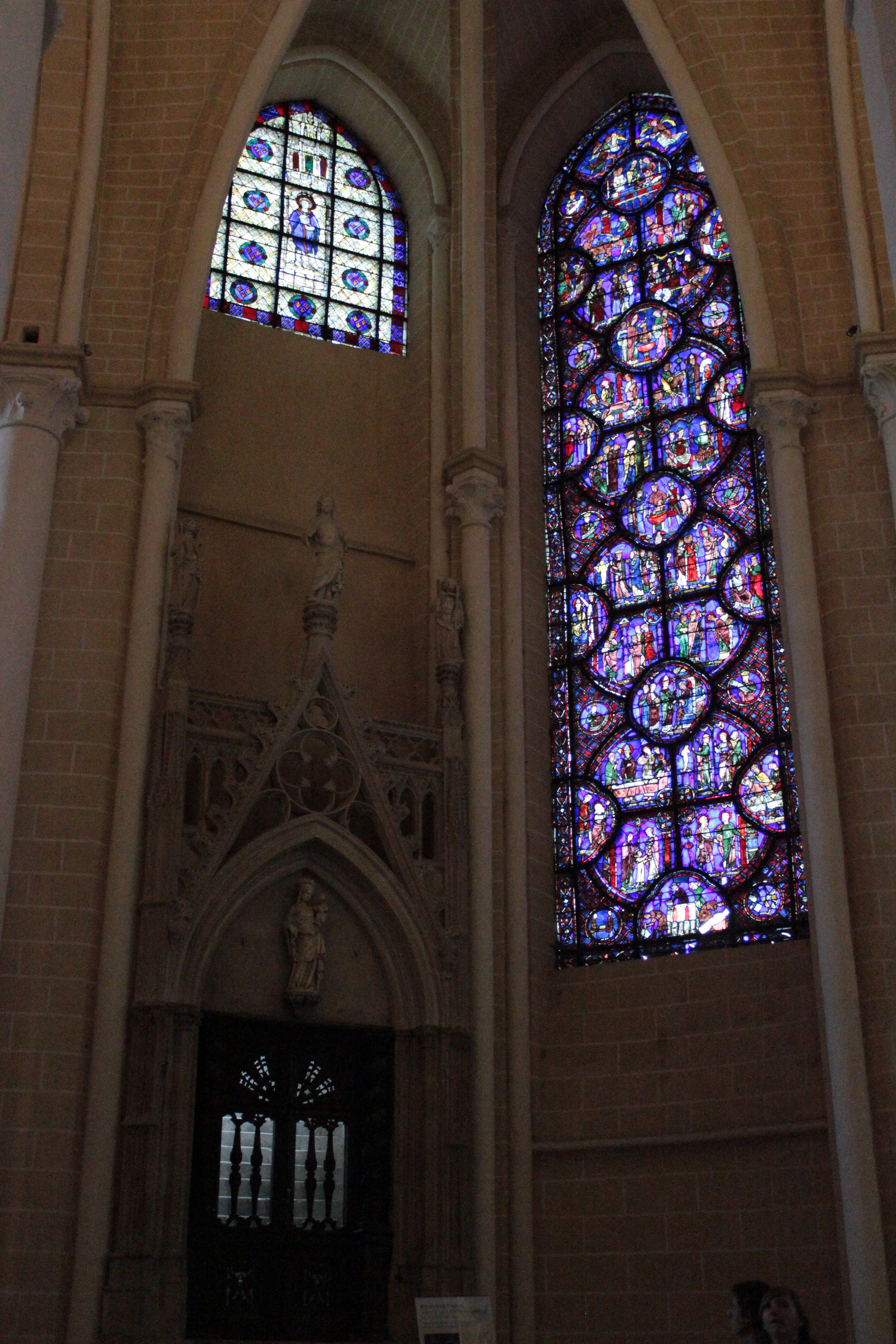
Bays 6 and 8
Entrance to the Saint Piatus Chapel

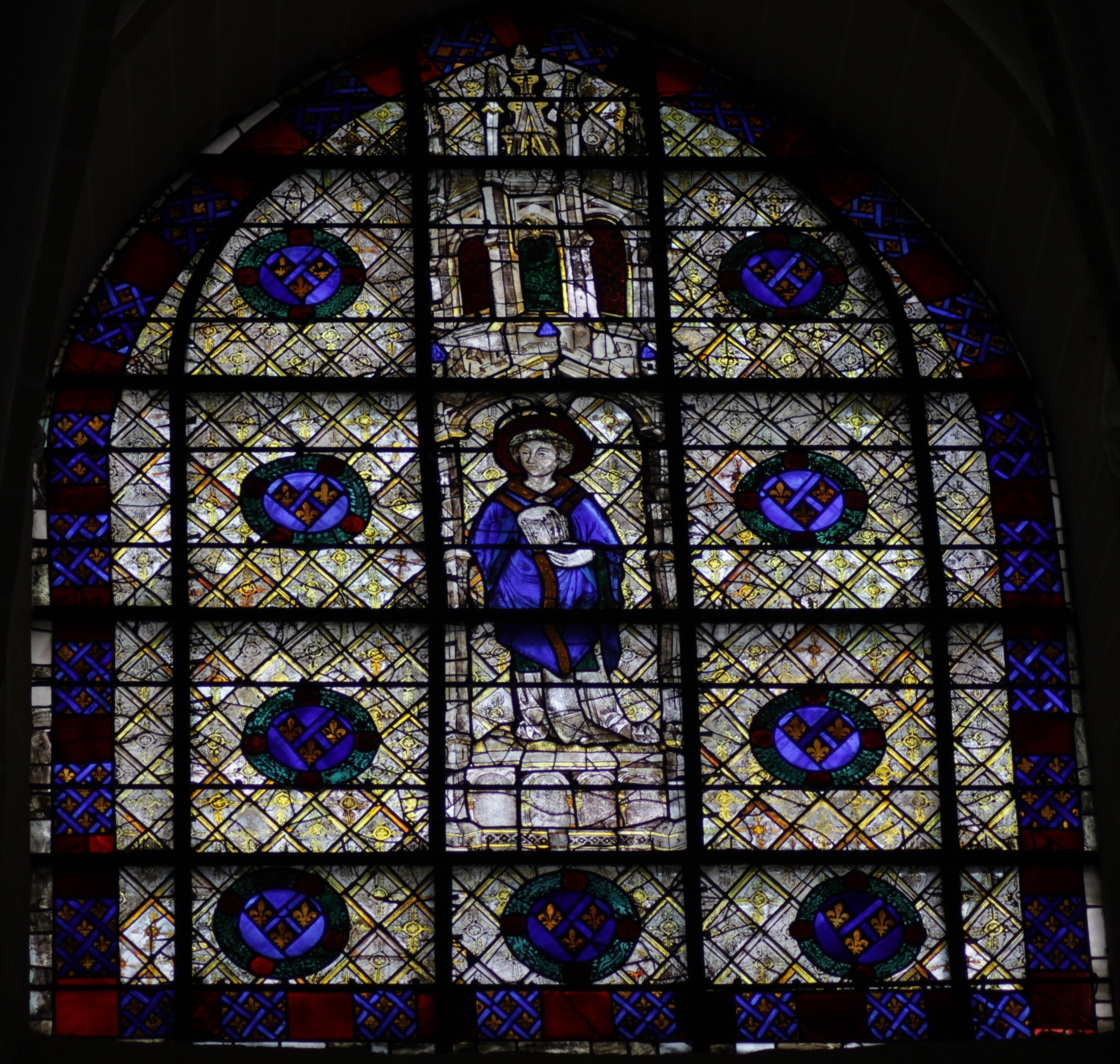
Bay 6
Grisaille: Saint Piatus Holding a Book, standing on a plinth and under a canopy

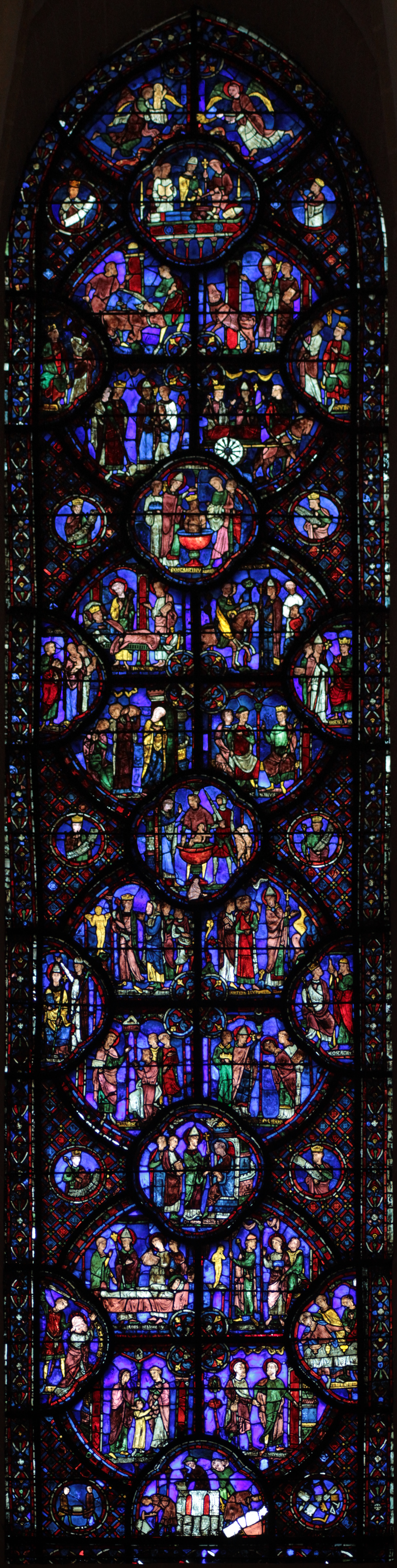
Bay 8
Saint-Sylvester

Bay	Location or title	Donors	Dates	Base Palissy	Wikimedia Commons
8	Life of Saint Sylvester	Masons and stone-cutters	1210–1225; Restored by Gaudin in 1921, restored again in 1999	Base Palissy: IM28000519, Ministère français de la Culture. (in French)	Media related to Bay 8 at Wikimedia Commons
6	Grisaille: saint Piatus	John II of France	1350–1360; Restored by Gaudin in 1921	Base Palissy: PM28000819, Ministère français de la Culture. (in French)	Media related to Bay 6 at Wikimedia Commons

==== Chapel of the Apostles (4-3) ====
Chapel of the Apostles

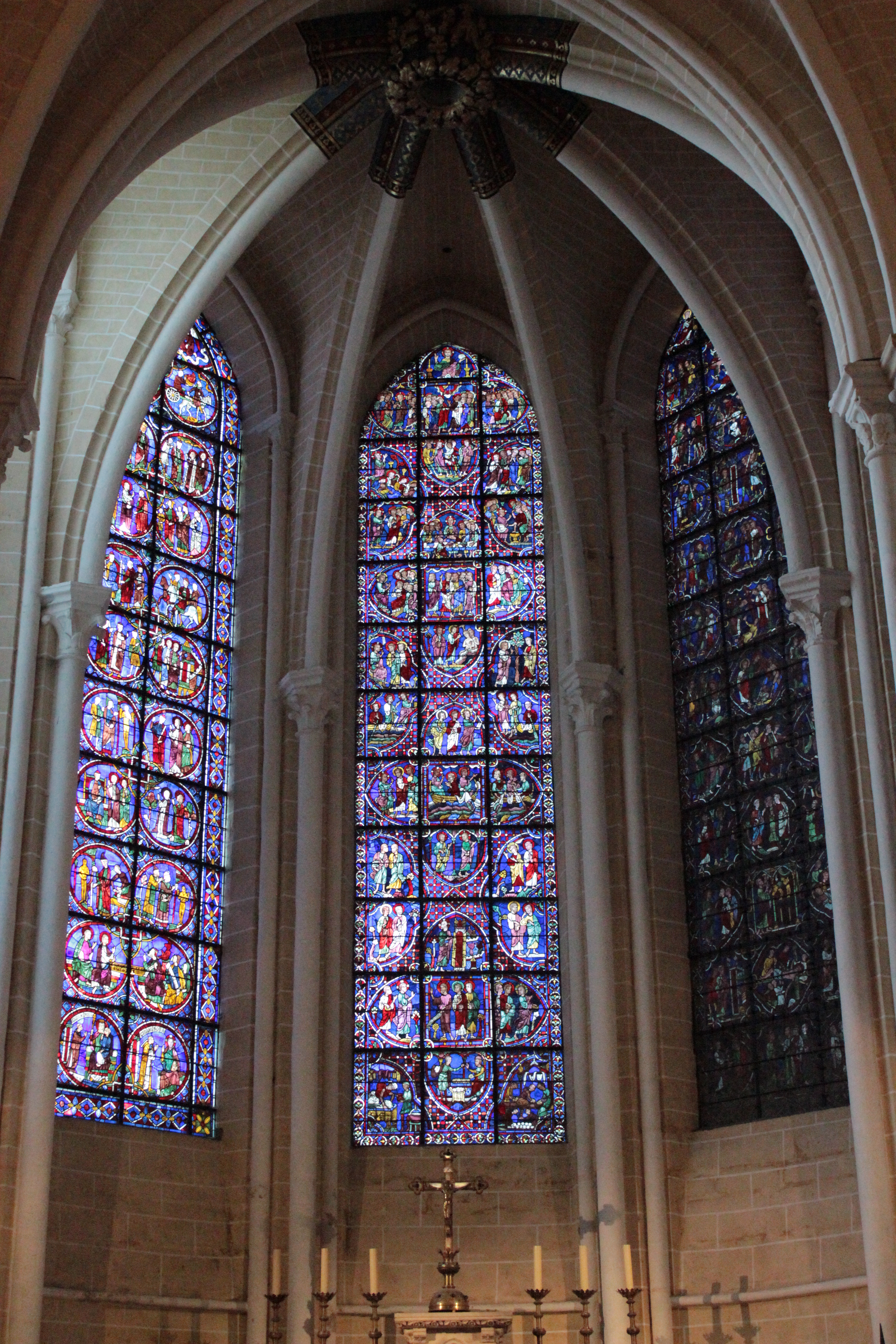
Bays 1, 0, and 2

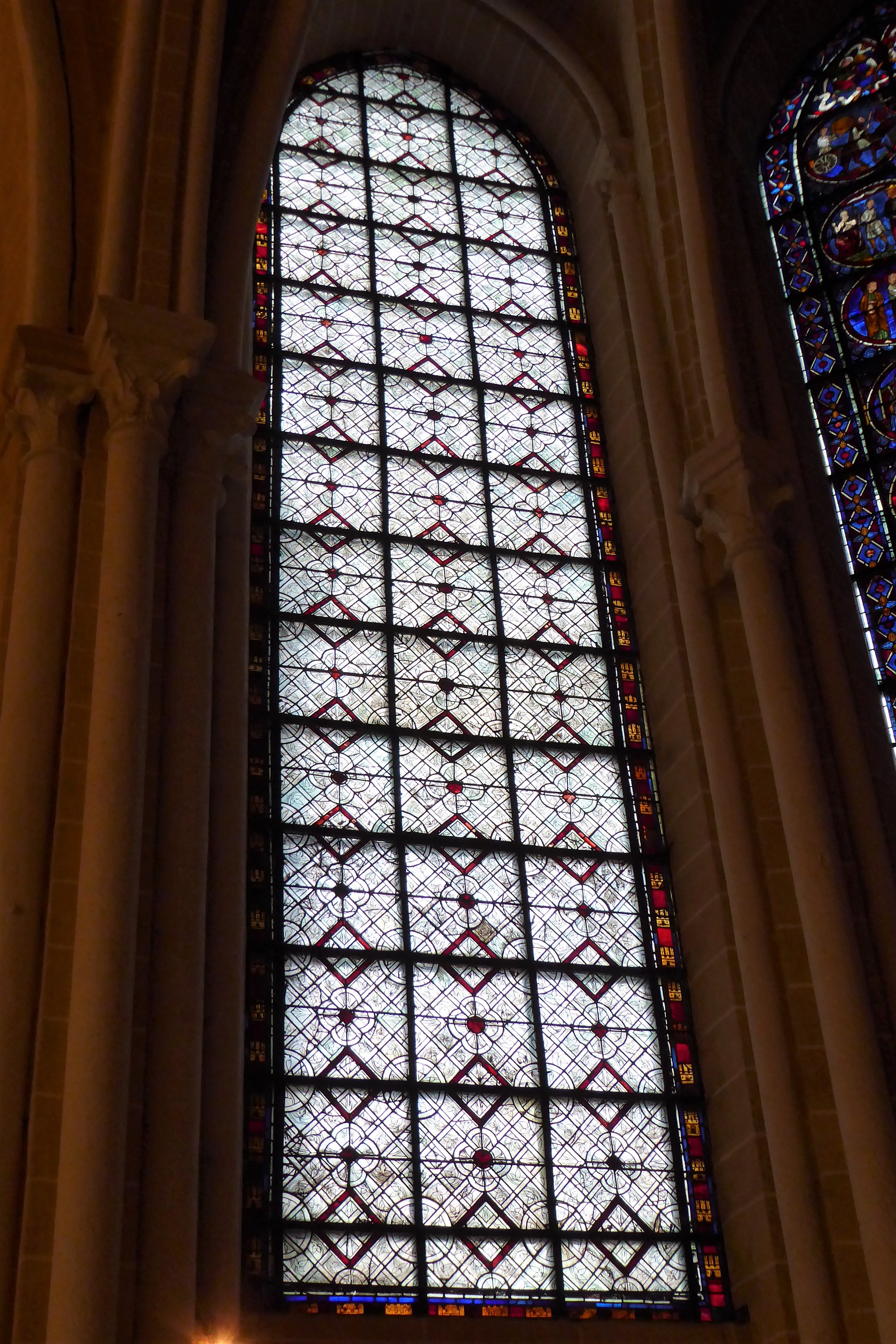
Bay 3
Grisaille

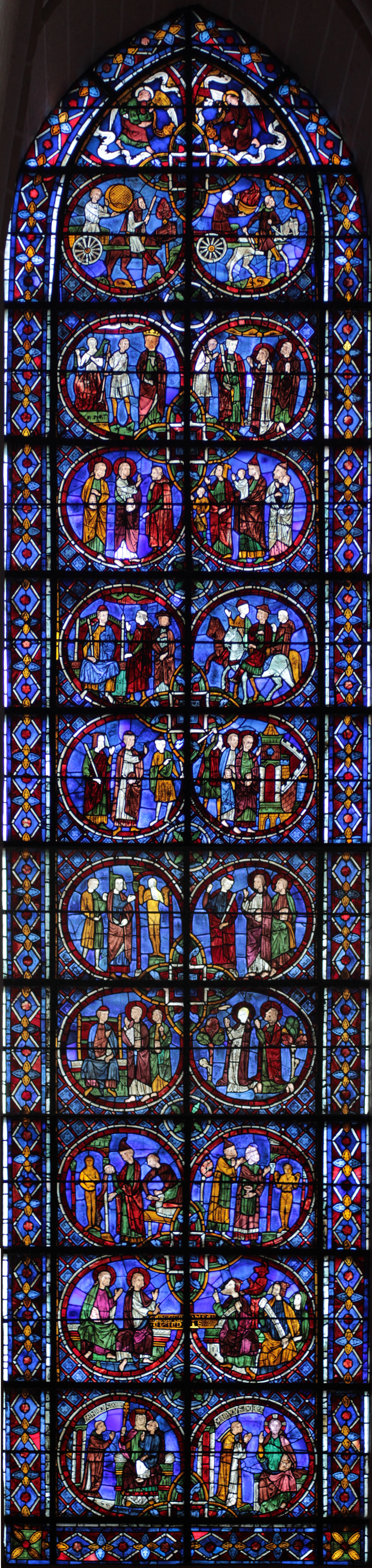
Bay 1
Saint Simon and Saint Jude

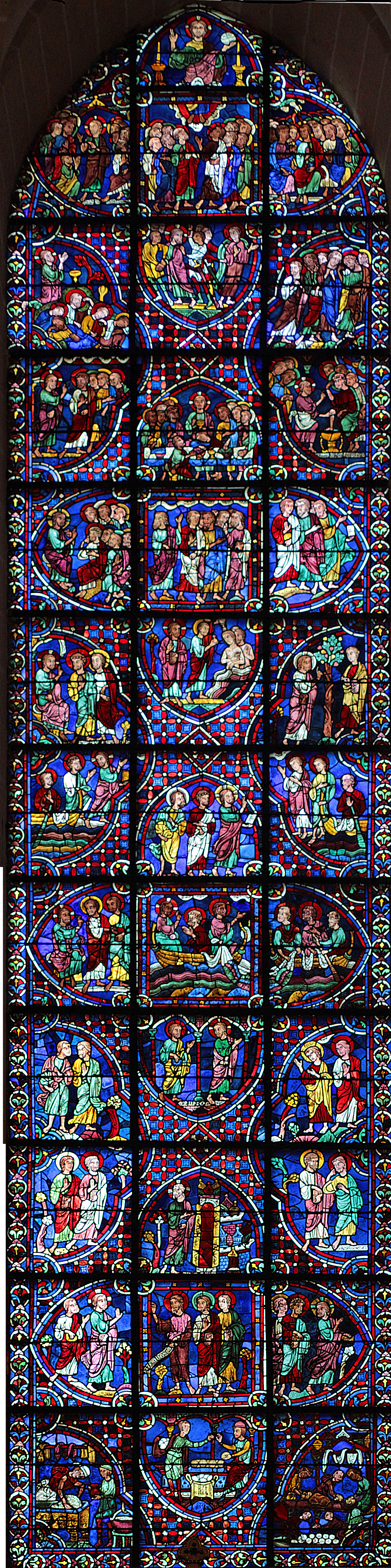
Bay 0
Lives of the Apostles

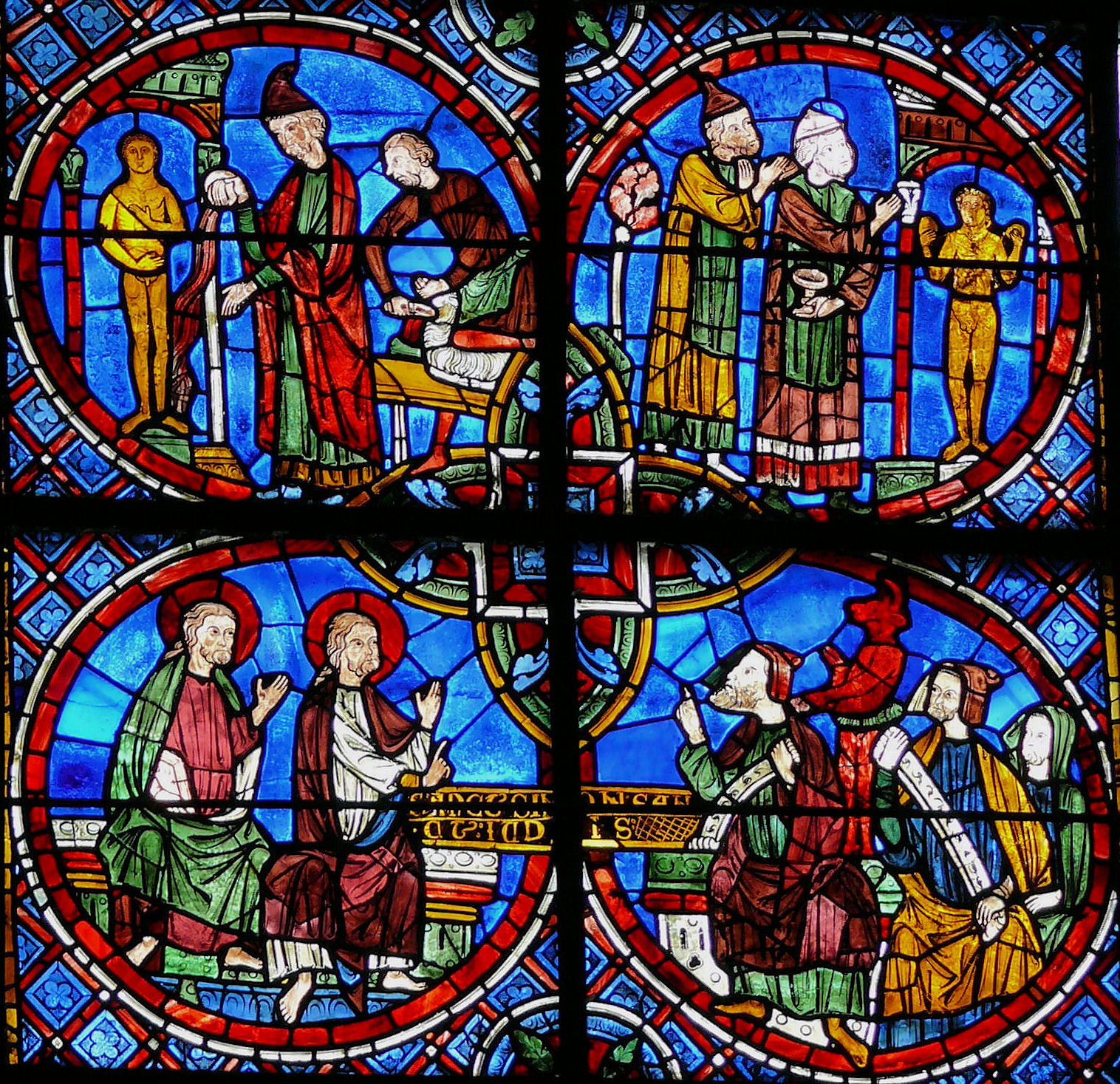
Bay 1
Lives of Saint Simon and Saint Jude

Bay	Title	Donors	Dates	Base Palissy	Wikimedia Commons
4	Life of Saint Paul	-	1210–1225; Restored in 1872 by Coffetier, restored again in 1999	Base Palissy: IM28000517, Ministère français de la Culture. (in French)	Media related to Bay 4 at Wikimedia Commons
2	Life of Saint Andrew	-	1210–1225; Restored in 1872 by Coffetier, restored again in 1998–1999 by Petit	Base Palissy: IM28000398, Ministère français de la Culture. (in French)	Media related to Bay 2 at Wikimedia Commons
0	Histoire des Apôtres	Bakers	1210–1225; Restored in 1872 by Coffetier, restored again in 1921 by Lorin, restored again in 1994–1995	Base Palissy: IM28000390, Ministère français de la Culture. (in French)	Media related to Bay 0 at Wikimedia Commons
1	Lives of Saint Simon and Saint Jude	Henri Noblet, canon	1220–1225; Restored in 1921 by Lorin, restored again in 2000–2001 by Petit	Base Palissy: IM28000399, Ministère français de la Culture. (in French)	Media related to Bay 1 at Wikimedia Commons
3	Grisaille	-	13th century Restored in the 20th century by C. Lorin and Gaudin	Base Palissy: PM28000821, Ministère français de la Culture. (in French)	

The chapel at the east end of most cathedrals is dedicated to the Virgin Mary and thus known as a Lady Chapel, but Chartres Cathedral is itself dedicated to the Virgin Mary and so its east-end chapel is dedicated to the apostles and their evangelisation. It was in this chapel that Pope Innocent III launched the Albigensian Crusade in 1208, mentioning the mission of the apostles and underlining that bishops were their successors.

==== Side Chapel (5-7) ====
Side Chapel (Bays 5 and 7)

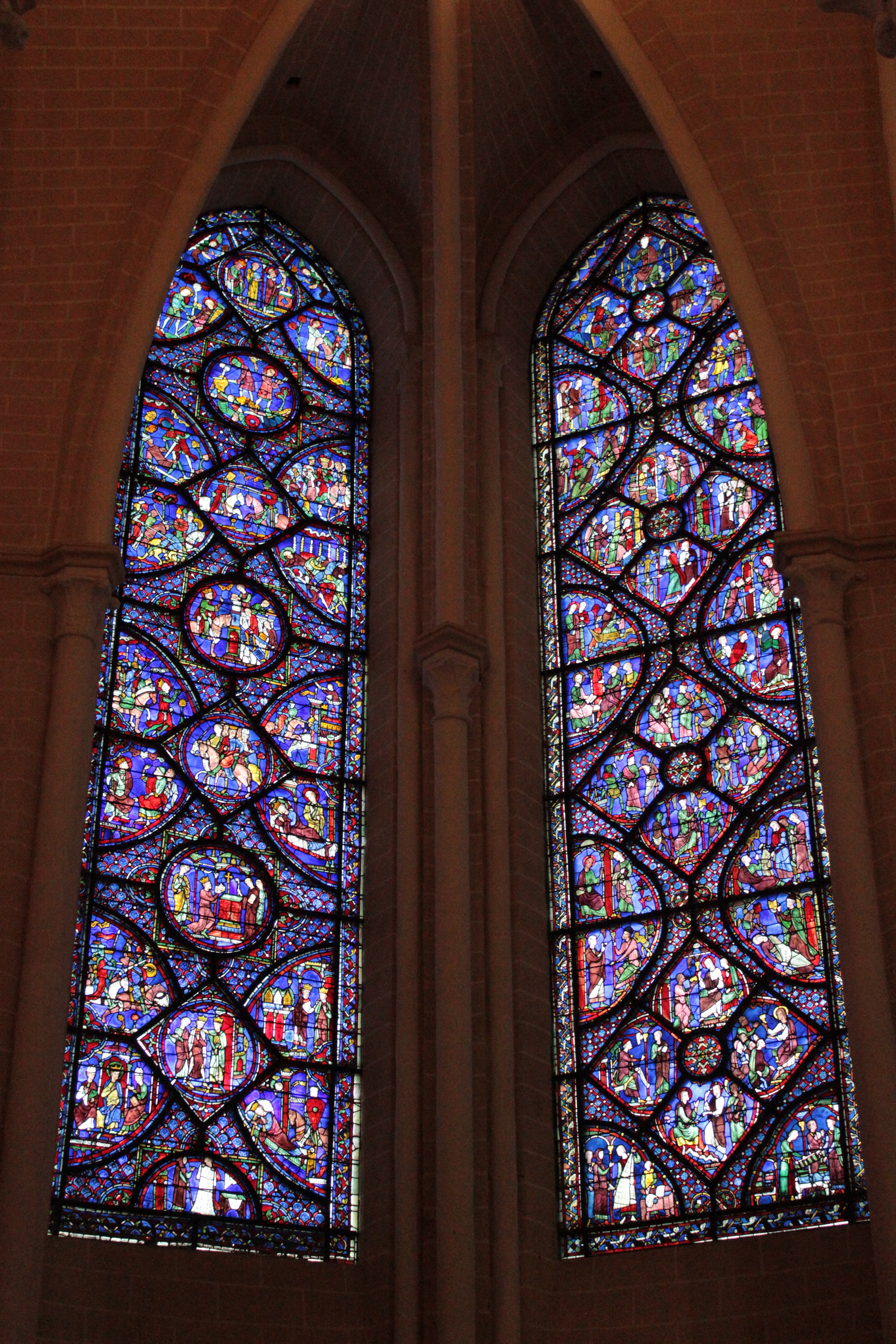
Bays 7 and 5

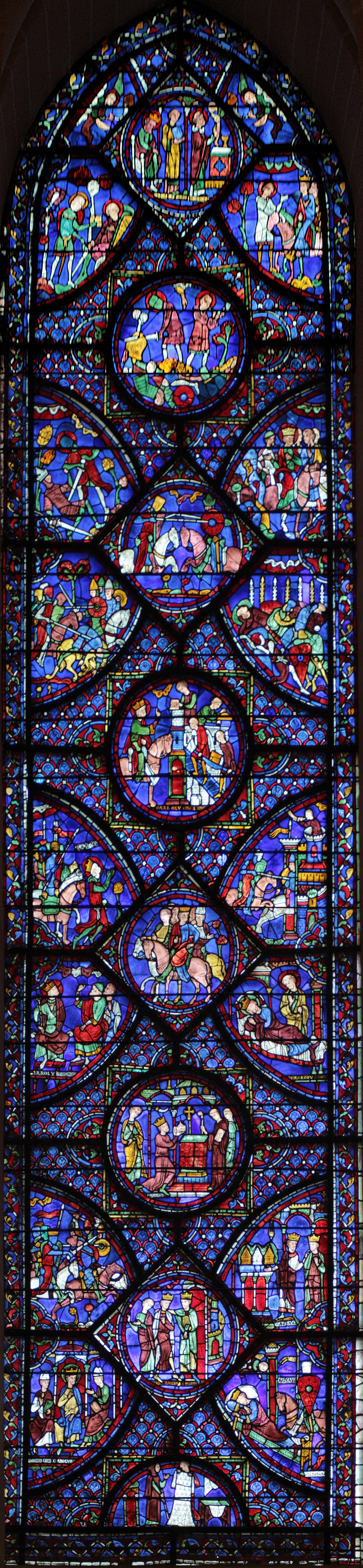
Bay 7
Charlemagne

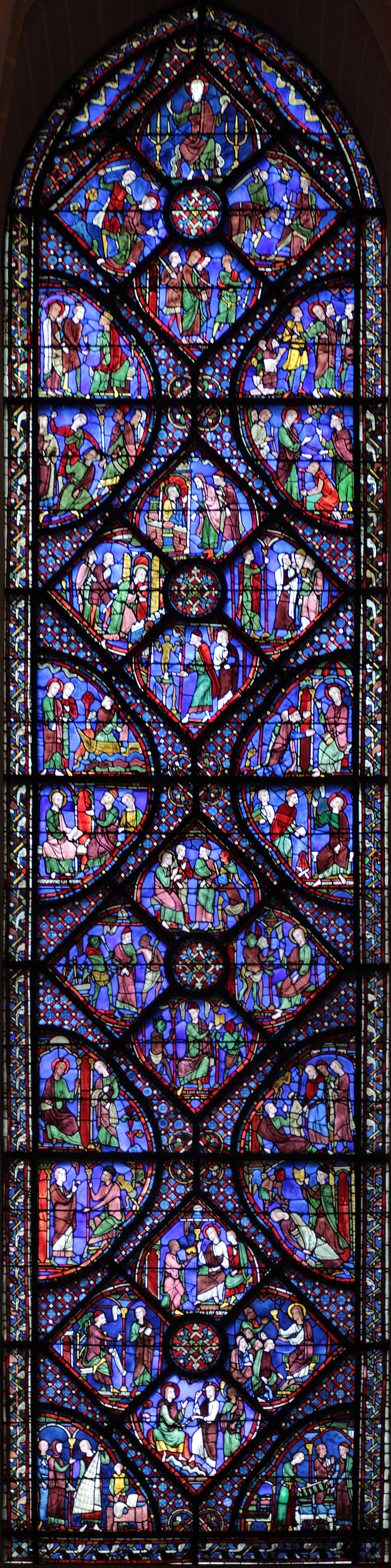
Bay 5
Saint James the Great

Bay	Location or title	Donors	Dates	Base Palissy	Wikimedia Commons
	Side Chapel (bays 5 and 7)				
5	Life of Saint James the Great	Furriers and drapers	1210–1225; Restored in 1921 by Lorin, restored again in 1994-1995 by the Avice-France Vitrail workshop	Base Palissy: IM28000391, Ministère français de la Culture. (in French)	Media related to Bay 5 at Wikimedia Commons
7	Life of Charlemagne	Furriers	1225; Restored by Lorin in 1921, restored again in 1999	Base Palissy: IM28000516, Ministère français de la Culture. (in French)	Media related to Bay 7 at Wikimedia Commons

==== Martyrs' Chapel (9-17) ====
Martyrs' Chapel

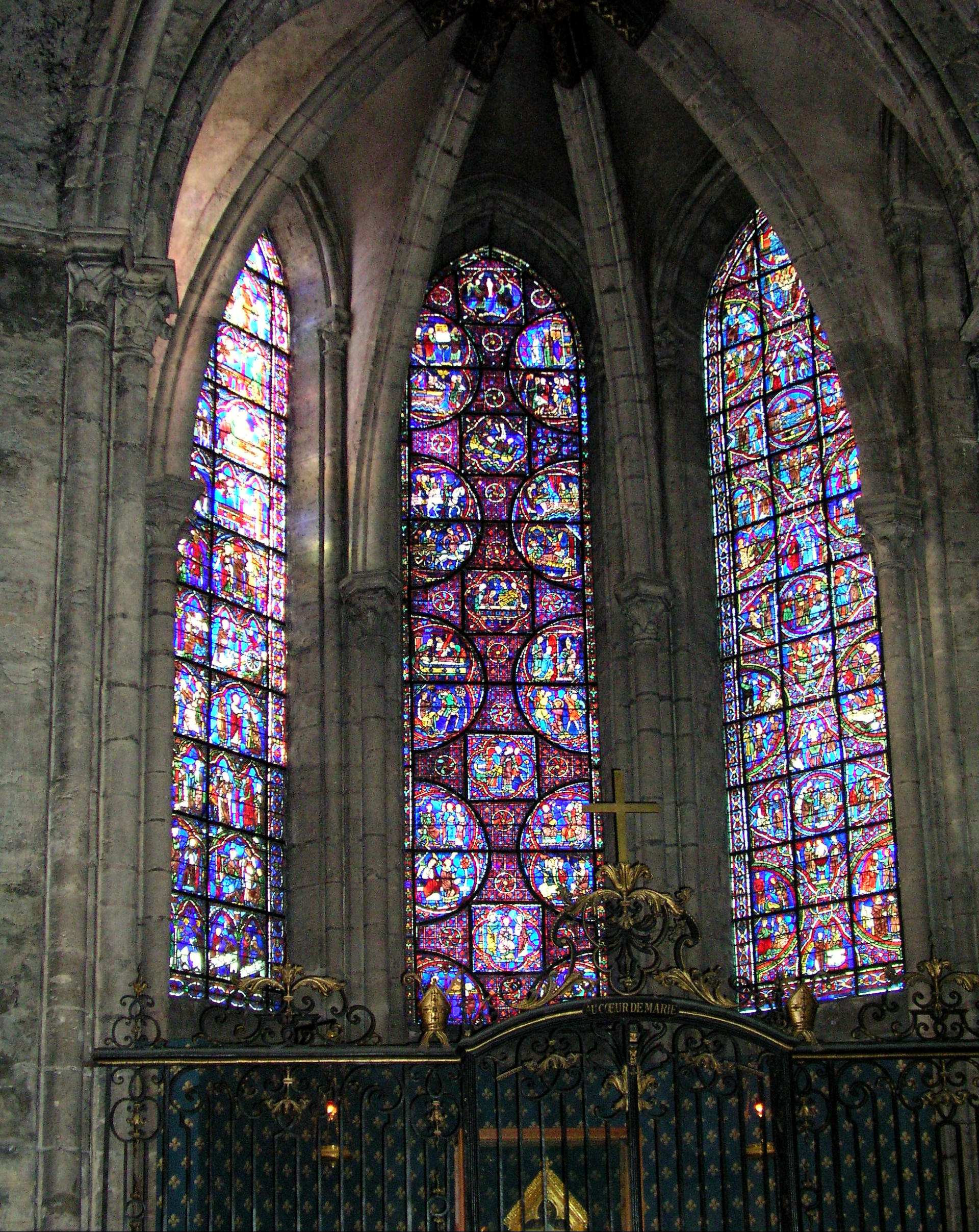
Martyrs' Chapel
Bays 15, 13, & 11

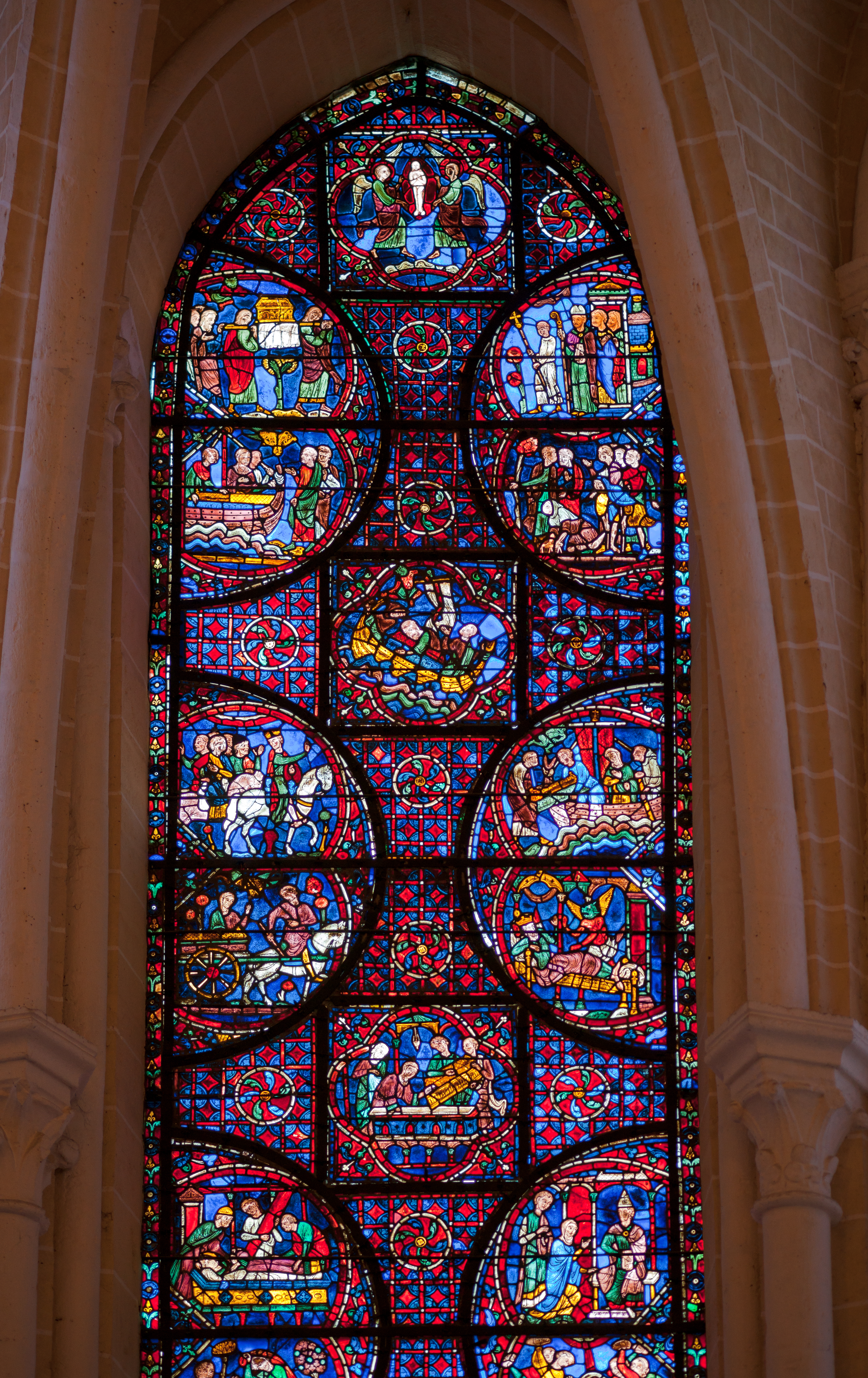
Life of Saint Stephen
Bay 13

Bay	Location or title	Donors	Dates	Base Palissy	Wikimedia Commons
	Martyrs' Chapel (apsidal or radiating chapel)				Media related to Martyrs' Chapel at Wikimedia Commons
9	Life of Saint Theodore and Saint Vincent	-	1210–1225	Base Palissy: PM28000818, Ministère français de la Culture. (in French)	Media related to Bay 9 at Wikimedia Commons
11	Life of Saint Pantaleon	Nicolas Li (or Le) Sesne	1220–1225; Restored in 1921 by Lorin, restored again in 2000-2001 by Avice-France Vitrail	Base Palissy: IM28000396, Ministère français de la Culture. (in French)	Media related to Bay 11 at Wikimedia Commons
13	Life of Saint Stephen	Shoemakers	1220–1225; Restored in the 15th century (lower border suppressed), restored again in 1922 by Lorin, restored again in 1999-2000 by Avice-France Vitrail	Base Palissy: IM28000394, Ministère français de la Culture. (in French)	Media related to Bay 13 at Wikimedia Commons
15	Life of Saint Chéron	Stone-cutters and sculptors	1220–1225; Restored in the 17th century, one panel restored in 1915, whole bay restored in 1922 by Lorin and again in 1998-1999 by Petit	Base Palissy: IM28000395, Ministère français de la Culture. (in French)	Media related to Bay 15 at Wikimedia Commons
17	Life of Saint Savinian and Saint Potentian	-	1210–1225	Base Palissy: PM28000818, Ministère français de la Culture. (in French)	Media related to Bay 17 at Wikimedia Commons

==== Side-chapel (19-23) ====
Side-Chapel (Bays 19, 21 and 23)

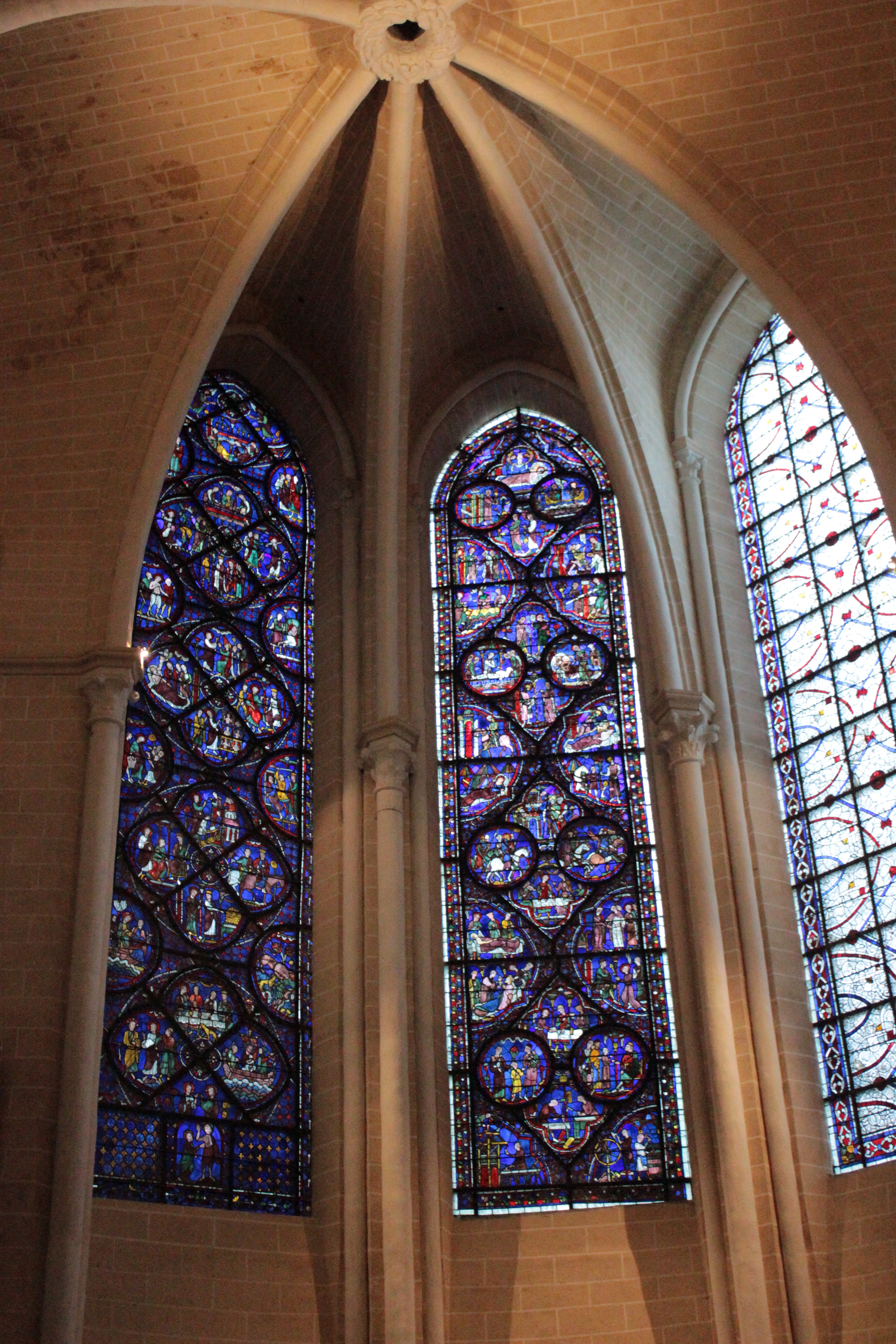
Side Chapel:
Bays 23, 21 and 19 (left to right)

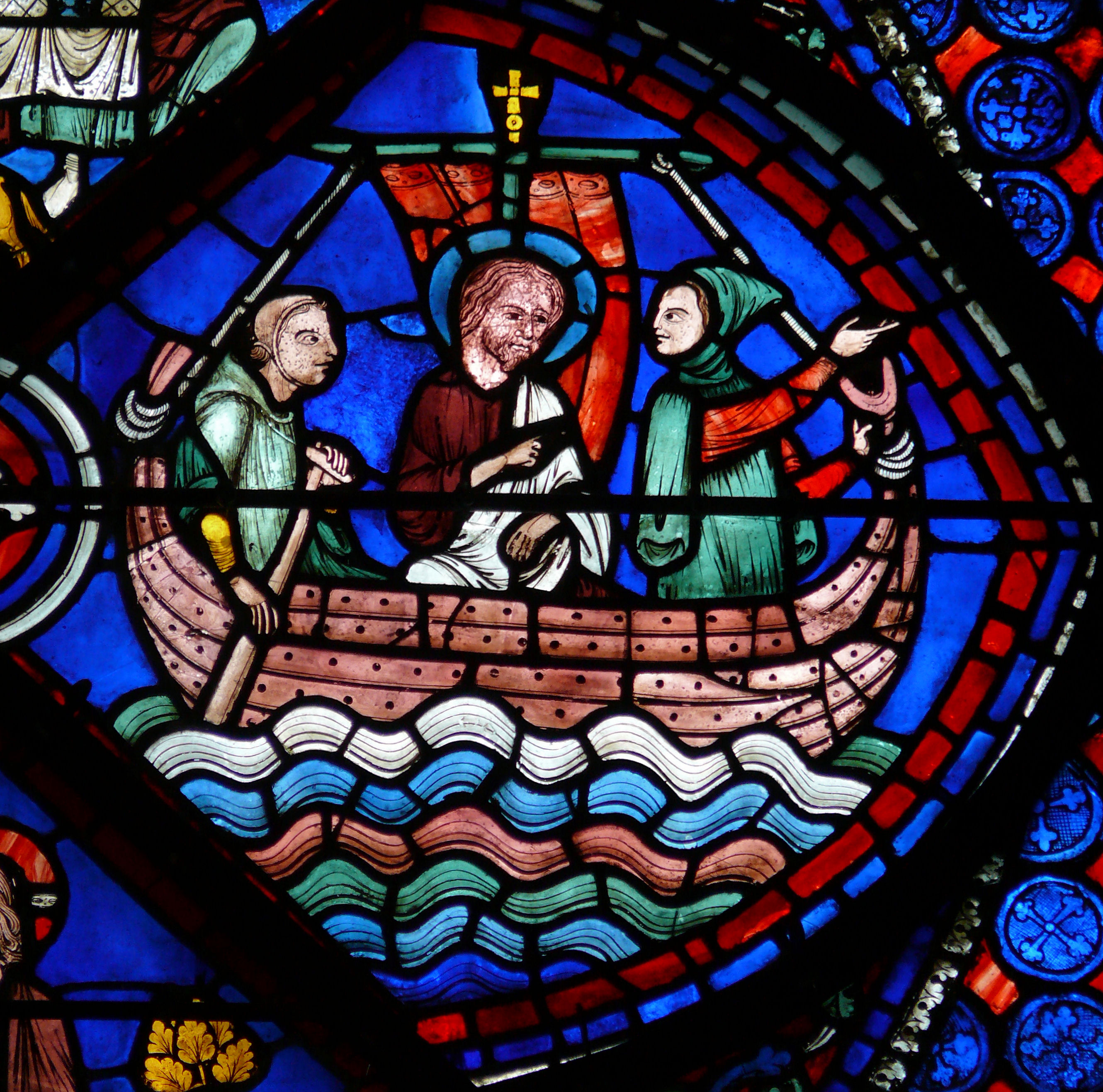
Bay 23
Life of Saint Thomas the Apostle

Bay	Location or title	Donors	Dates	Base Palissy	Wikimedia Commons
19	Grisaille	-	circa 1240; Restored in the 20th century by C.Lorin and Gaudin	Base Palissy: PM28000821, Ministère français de la Culture. (in French)	Media related to Bay 19 at Wikimedia Commons
21	Life of Saint Julian the Hospitaller	-	1210-1225; Restored late 19th century-early 20th century by Lorin and Gaudin	Base Palissy: PM28000818, Ministère français de la Culture. (in French)	Media related to Bay 21 at Wikimedia Commons
23	Life of Saint Thomas the Apostle	-	1210–1240; Restored late 19th century-early 20th century by Lorin and Gaudin	Base Palissy: PM28000818, Ministère français de la Culture. (in French)	Media related to Bay 23 at Wikimedia Commons

==== North Ambulatory (25-29) ====
North Ambulatory

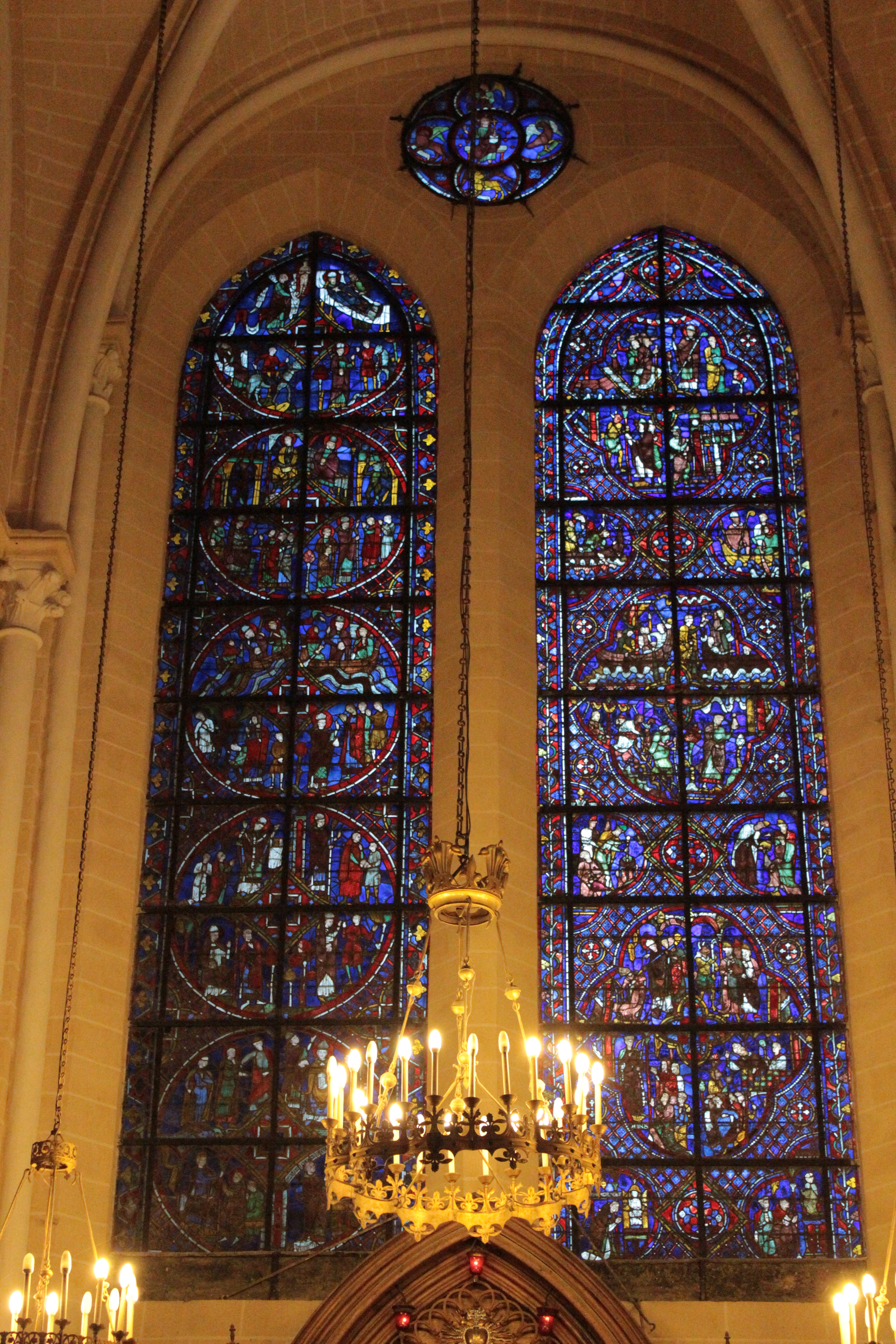
Our Lady of the Pillar Chapel
Bay 29

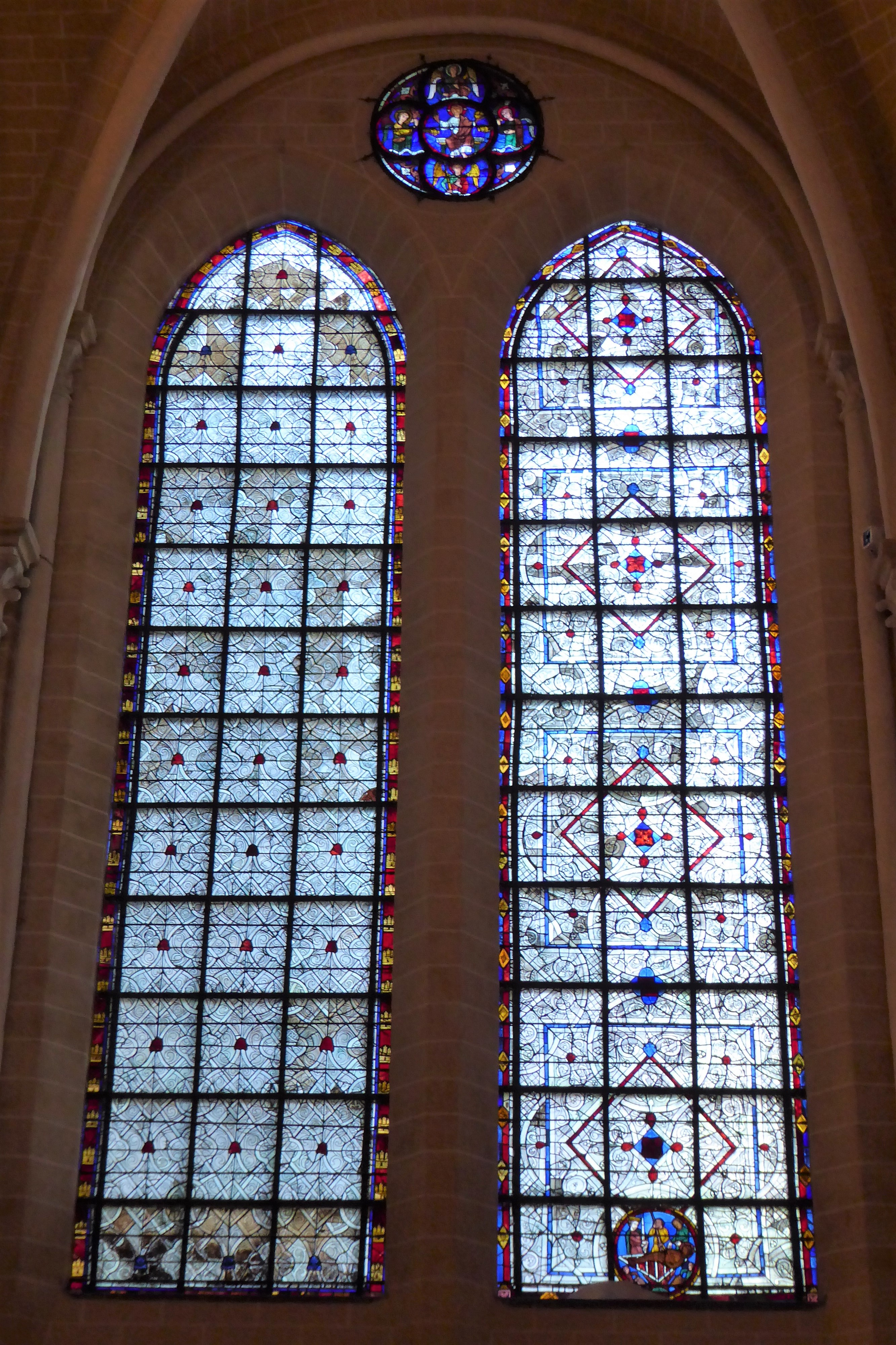
Bay 25
Decorative grisaille

Bay	Site or name	Donors	Dates	Base Palissy	Wikimedia Commons
25	2 grisaille lancets below an oculus of Christ Enthroned Blessing	-	1230–1250; Restored early in the 20th century by C. Lorin and Gaudin	Base Palissy: PM28000821, Ministère français de la Culture. (in French)	Media related to Bay 25 at Wikimedia Commons
27	2 grisaille lancets below an oculus of Christ Enthroned Blessing	-	1230–1250; Restored early in the 20th century by C. Lorin and Gaudin	Base Palissy: PM28000821, Ministère français de la Culture. (in French)	Media related to Bay 27 at Wikimedia Commons
	Our Lady of the Pillar Chapel				Media related to Our Lady of the Pillar Chapel at Wikimedia Commons
29	2 lancets Left: Life of Saint Germanus of Auxerre; Right: Miracles of Saint Nicolas; Oculus: Christ Blessing with a tetramorph.	Le chanoine Geoffroy Chardonel; Étienne Chardonel, canon	1225–1235; Both lancets restored in 1919 by Lorin, left lancet restored in 1925, whole bay restored in 1999 by Avice-France Vitrail (Le Mans)	Base Palissy: IM28000521, Ministère français de la Culture. (in French)	Media related to Bay 29 at Wikimedia Commons

=== North transept ===
In the north part of the transepts bay 31 dates from 1971 and bay 33 includes fragments of 12th- and 13th-century panels remounted with modern elements in 1964.

North Transept

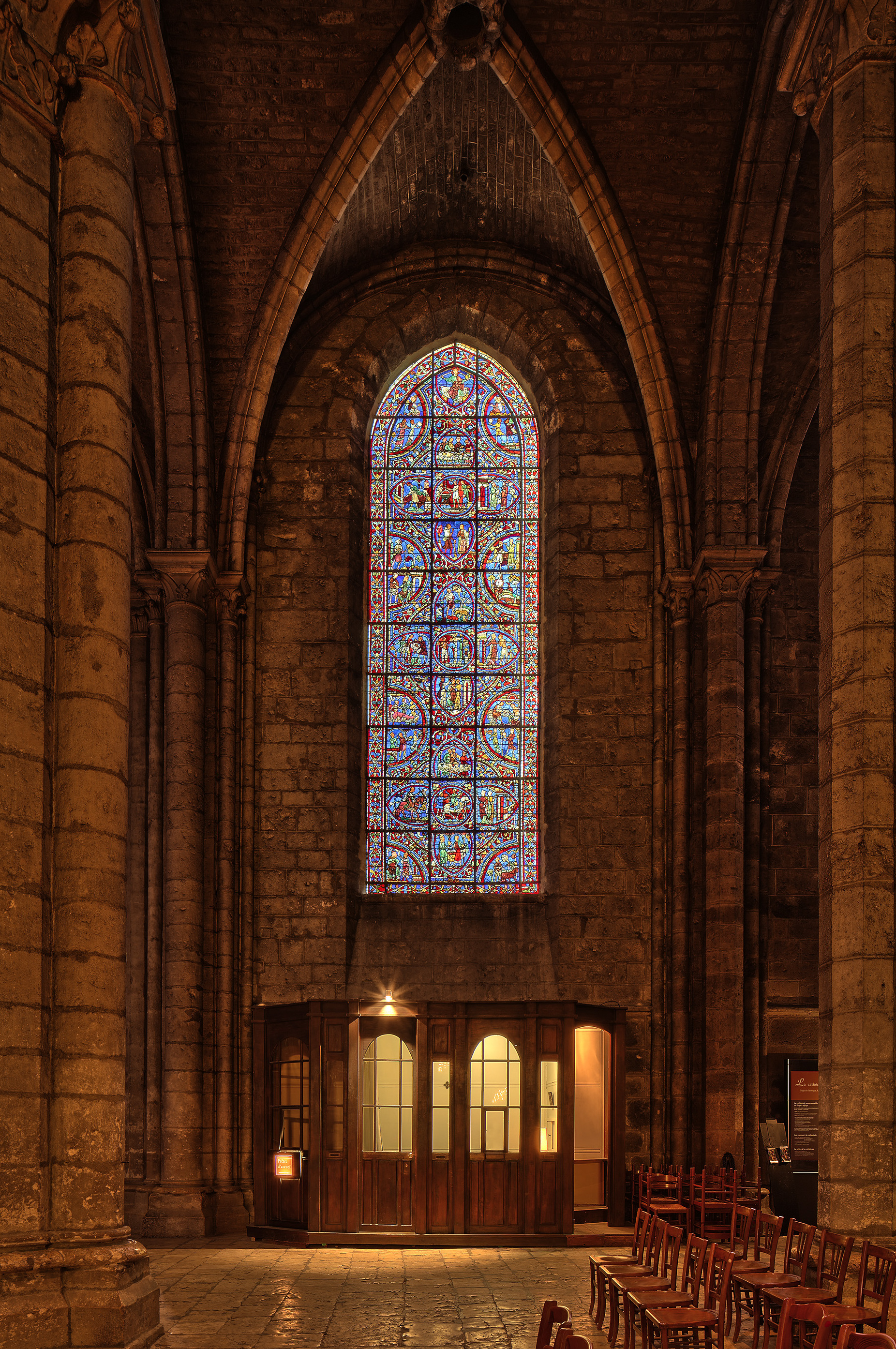
Bay 35
Parable of the Prodigal Son

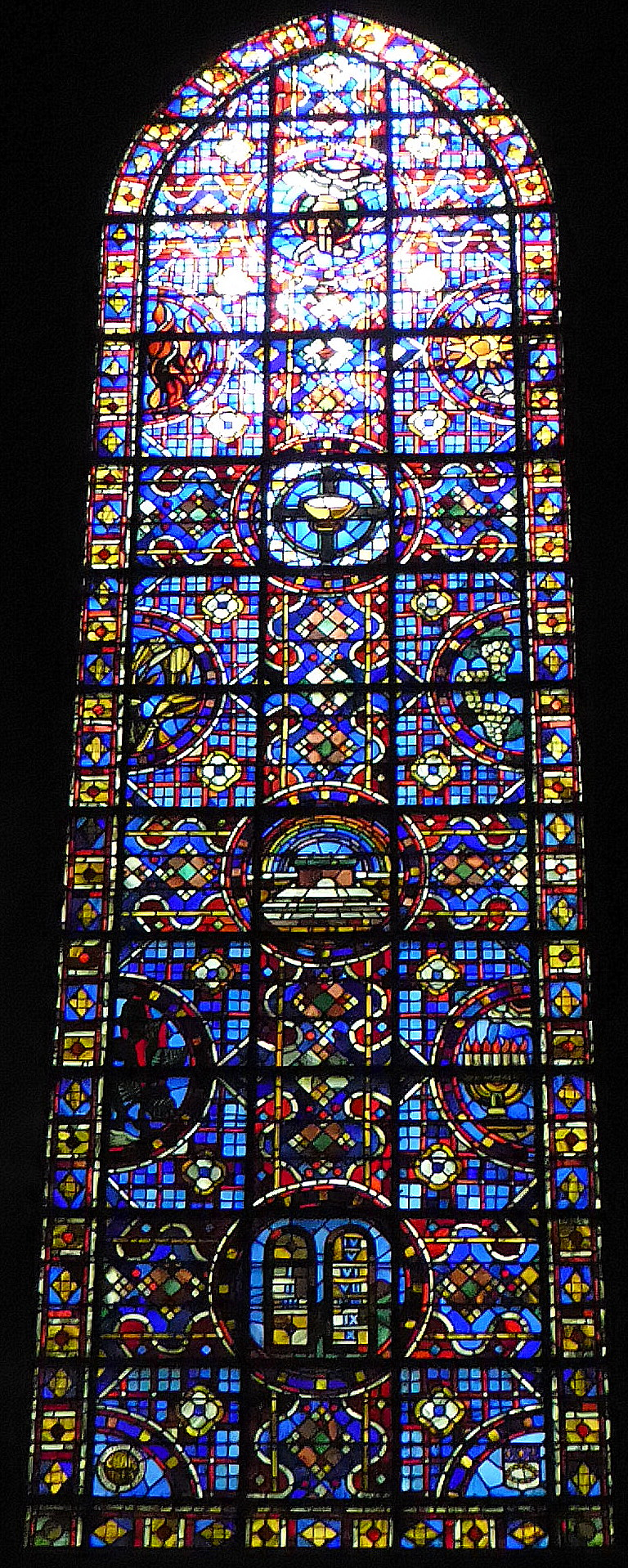
Bay 31
Reconciliation between God and Humanity

Bay	Name	Donors	Dates	Base Palissy	Wikimedia Commons
31	Window symbolising reconciliation between God and humanity	Association allemande des Amis de la cathédrale de Chartres	1971; Lorin workshop	Base Palissy: PM28000807, Ministère français de la Culture. (in French)	Media related to Bay 31 at Wikimedia Commons
33	Vegetal decoration	-	12th- and 13th-century fragments incorporated into a new window by F. Lorin in 1964	Base Palissy: PM28000807, Ministère français de la Culture. (in French)	Media related to Bay 33 at Wikimedia Commons
35	Parable of the Prodigal Son	-	1205–1215; Restored by Lorin in 1923, restored again in the 1980s	Base Palissy: IM28000467, Ministère français de la Culture. (in French)	Media related to Bay 35 at Wikimedia Commons

=== North of the nave ===
Unlike the other windows, those on the Passion and Redemption (bay 37) read top to bottom.

North Side of the Nave: Bays 47, 41, 39 and 37

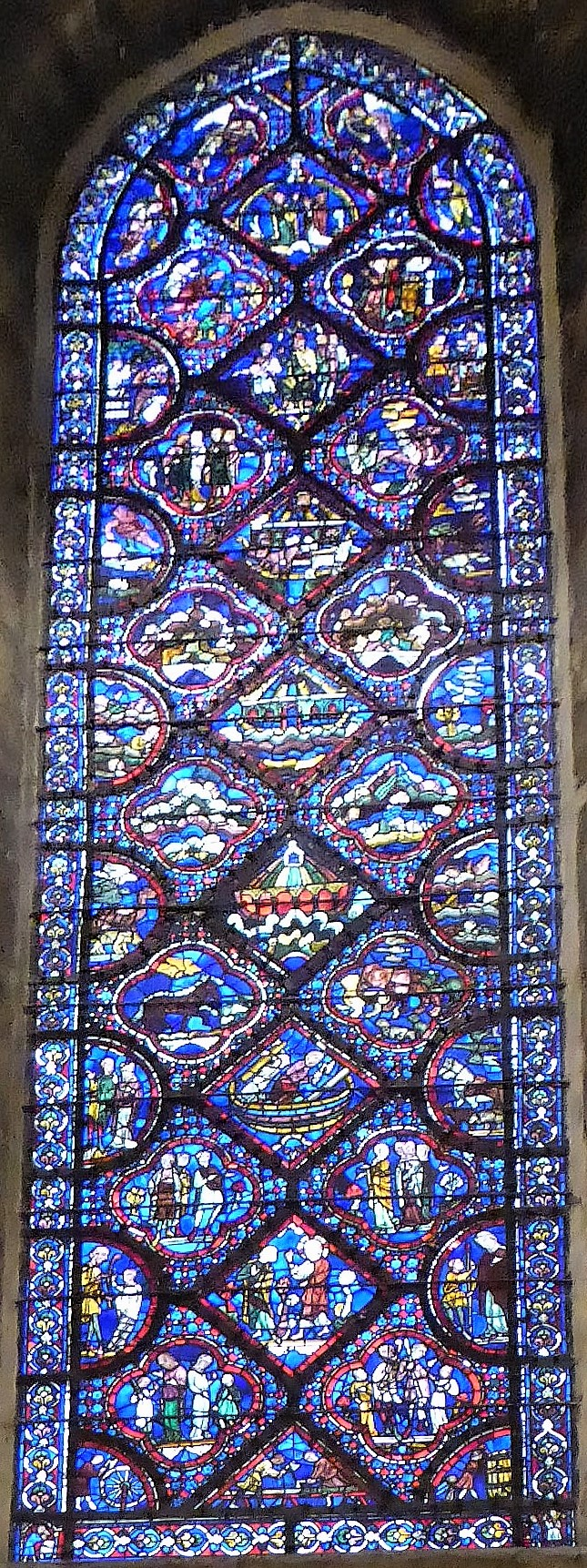
Bay 47
Life of Noah

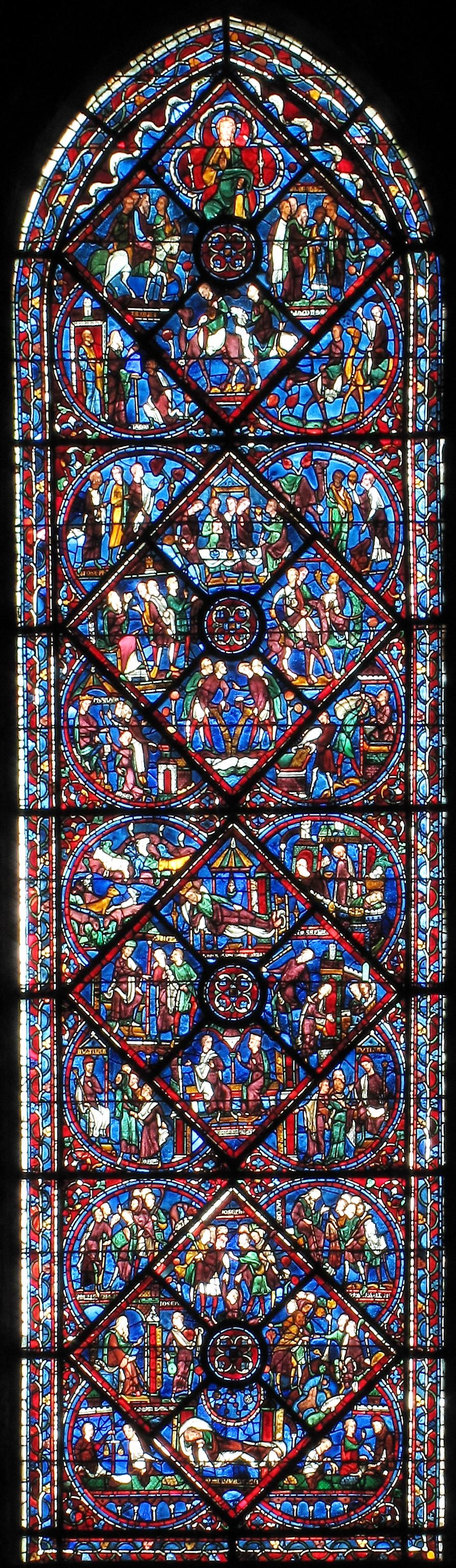
Bay 41
Life of Joseph

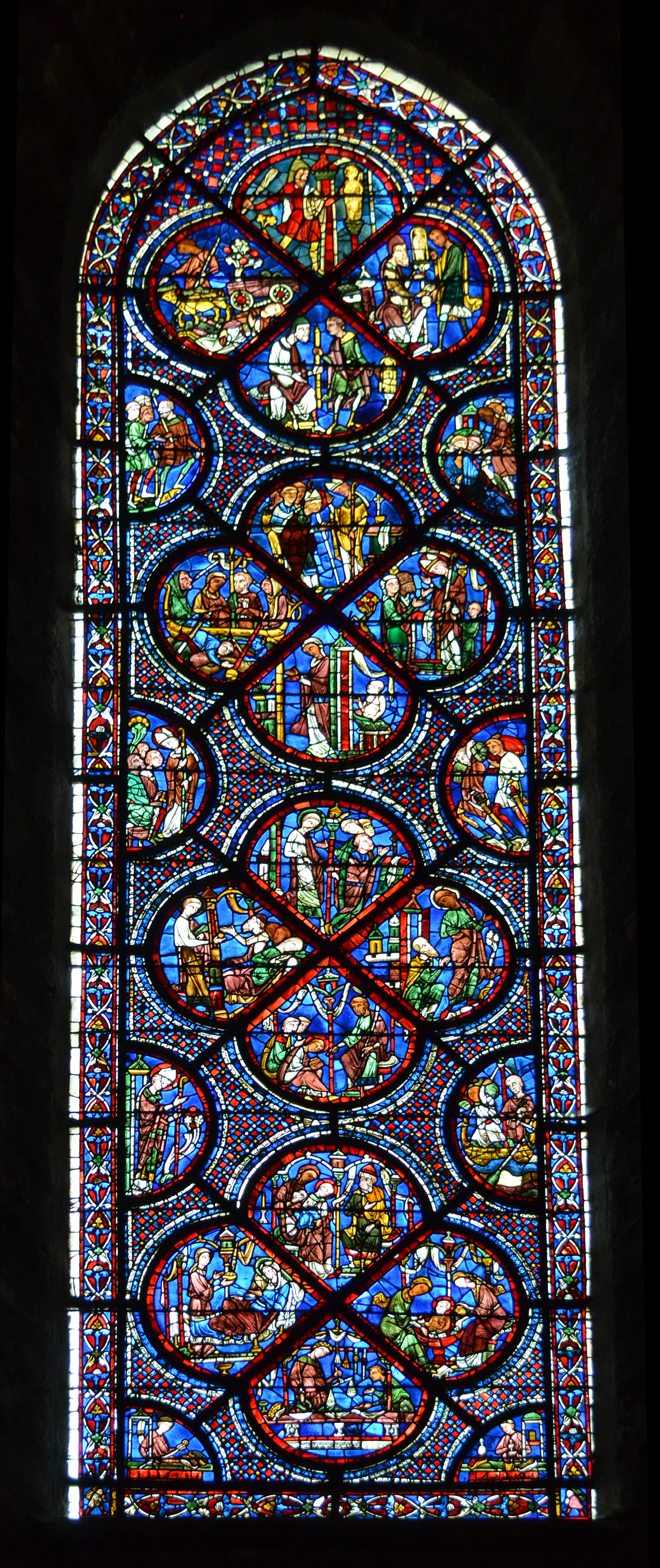
Bay 39
Life and Miracles of Saint Nicolas

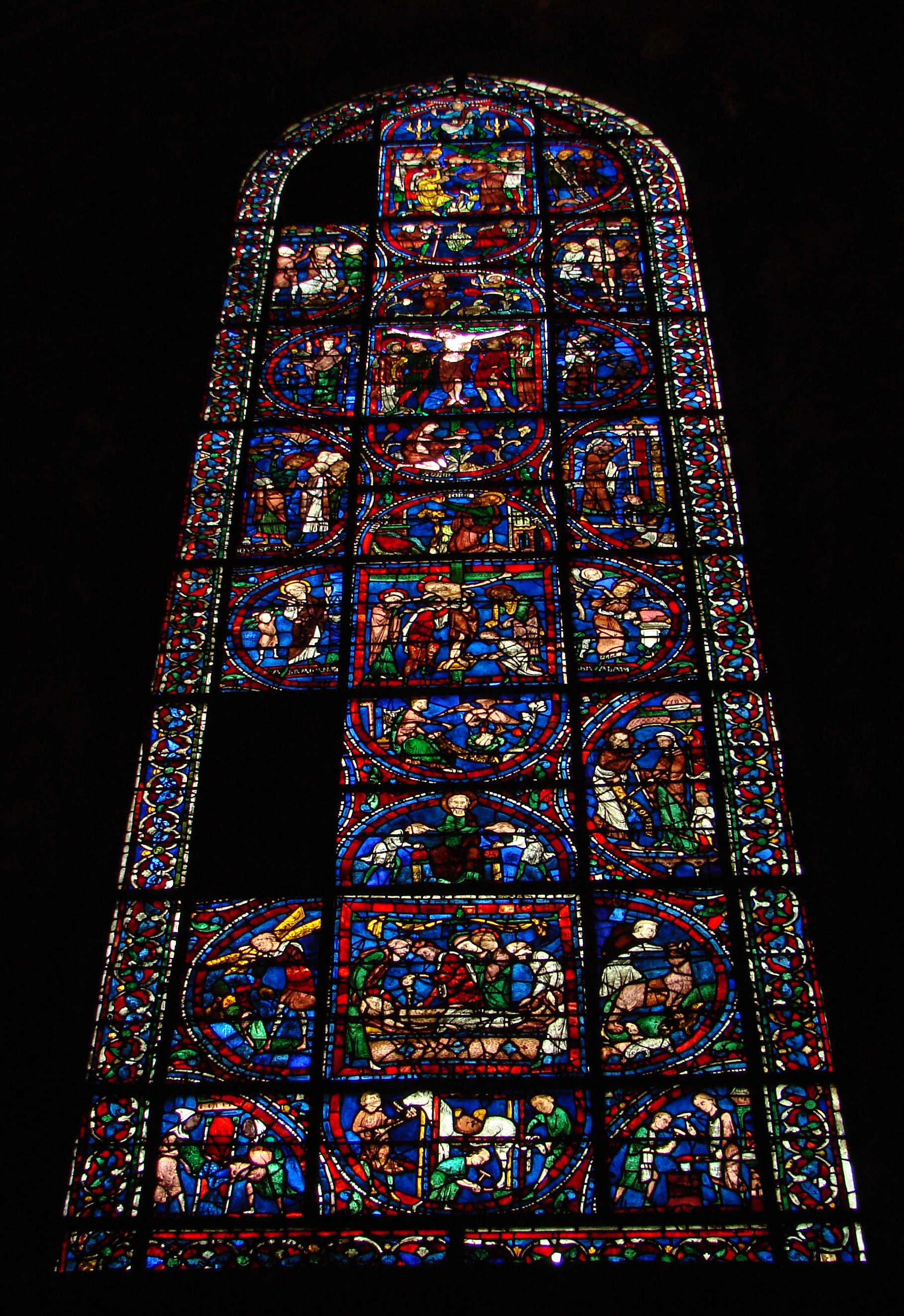
Bay 37
Typological Passion
(Descent from the Cross)

Bay	Name	Donors	Dates	Base Palissy	Wikimedia Commons
37	Passion and Redemption	Master farriers	1205–1215; 7 panels destroyed in 1816; restored by Lorin in 1876, restored in the 1980s	Base Palissy: IM28000464, Ministère français de la Culture. (in French)	Media related to Bay 37 at Wikimedia Commons
39	Life and Miracles of Saint Nicolas	Apothecaries	1220–1225; Restored by Gaudin in 1924, restored again in the 1980s	Base Palissy: IM28000463, Ministère français de la Culture. (in French)	Media related to Bay 39 at Wikimedia Commons
41	Life of Joseph	Money-changers	1205–1215; Restored by Gaudin in 1924, restored again in the 1980s	Base Palissy: IM28000476, Ministère français de la Culture. (in French)	Media related to Bay 41 at Wikimedia Commons
43	Life of Saint Eustache	Drapers and furriers	1210; Restored by Gaudin in 1924, restored again in the 1980s	Base Palissy: IM28000475, Ministère français de la Culture. (in French)	Media related to Bay 43 at Wikimedia Commons
45	Life of Saint Lubin	Wine merchants	1205–1215; Restored by Gaudin in 1924, restored again in the 1980s	Base Palissy: IM28000474, Ministère français de la Culture. (in French)	Media related to Bay 45 at Wikimedia Commons
47	Life of Noah	Carpenters, wheelwrights and coopers	1205–1215; Restored by Gaudin in 1924, restored again in the 1980s	Base Palissy: IM28000473, Ministère français de la Culture. (in French)	Media related to Bay 47 at Wikimedia Commons

Details of Bays 37, 41, 43 and 45

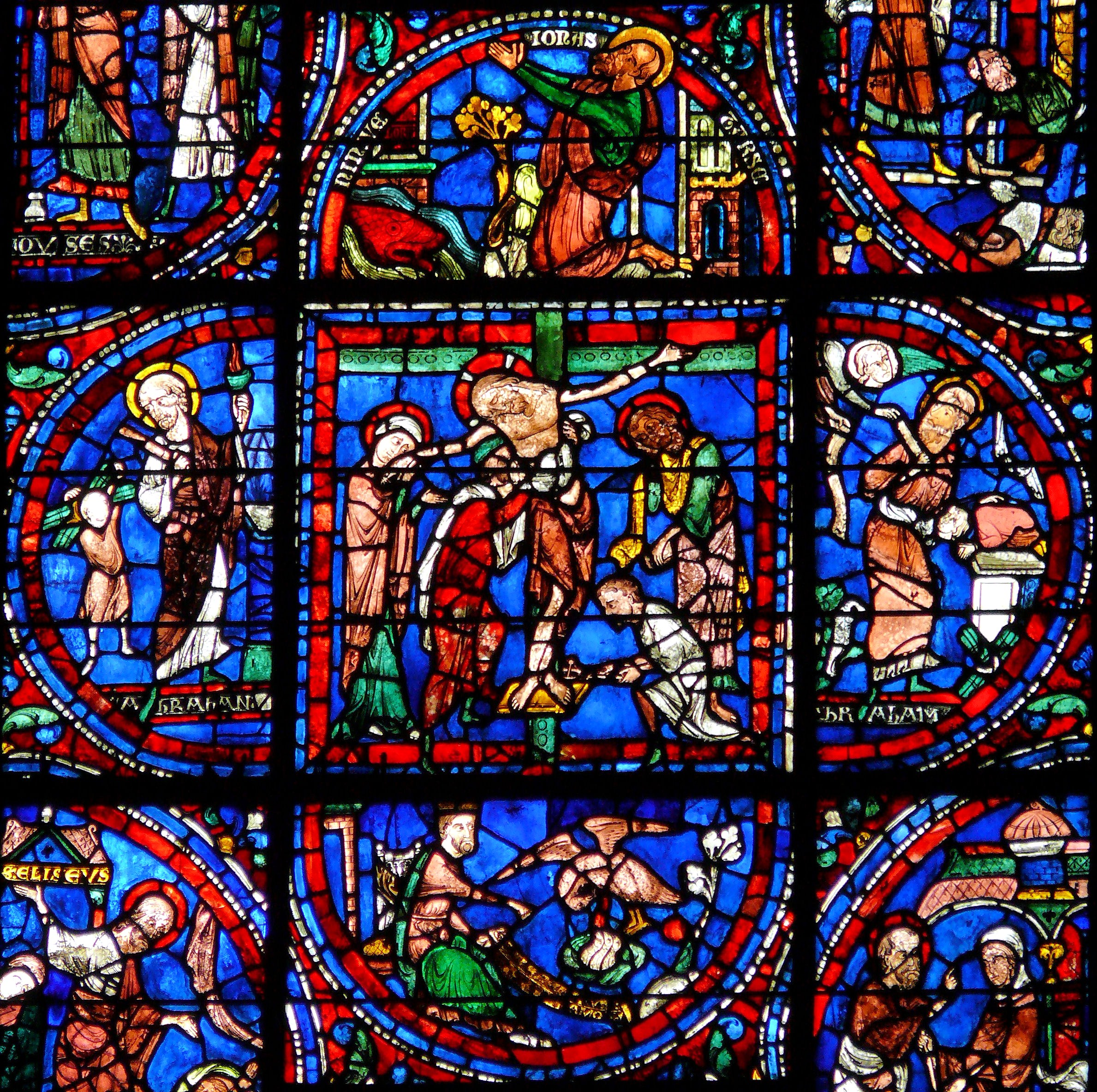
Bay 37
Typological Passion
(Descent from the Cross)

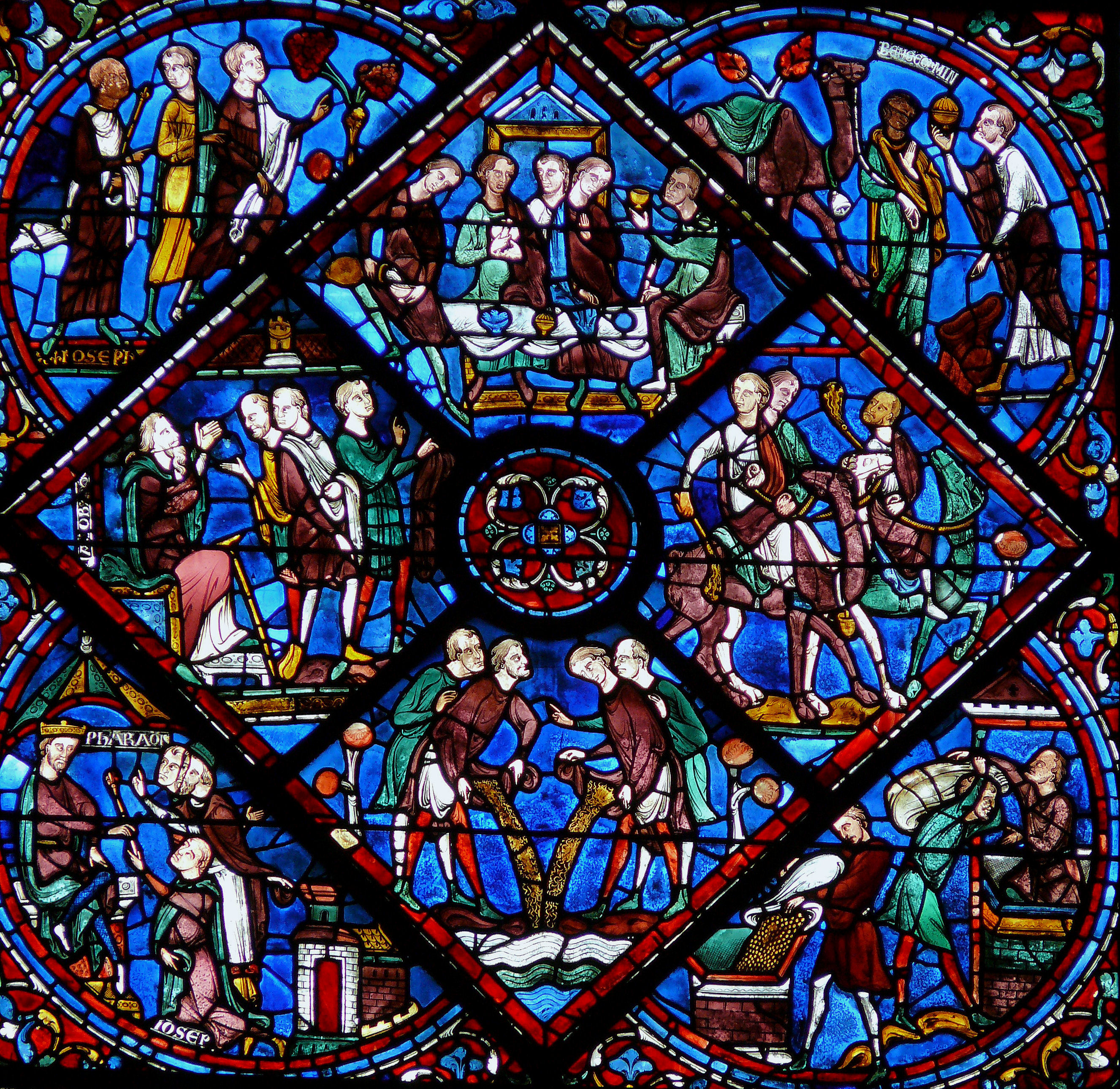
Bay 41
Life of Joseph

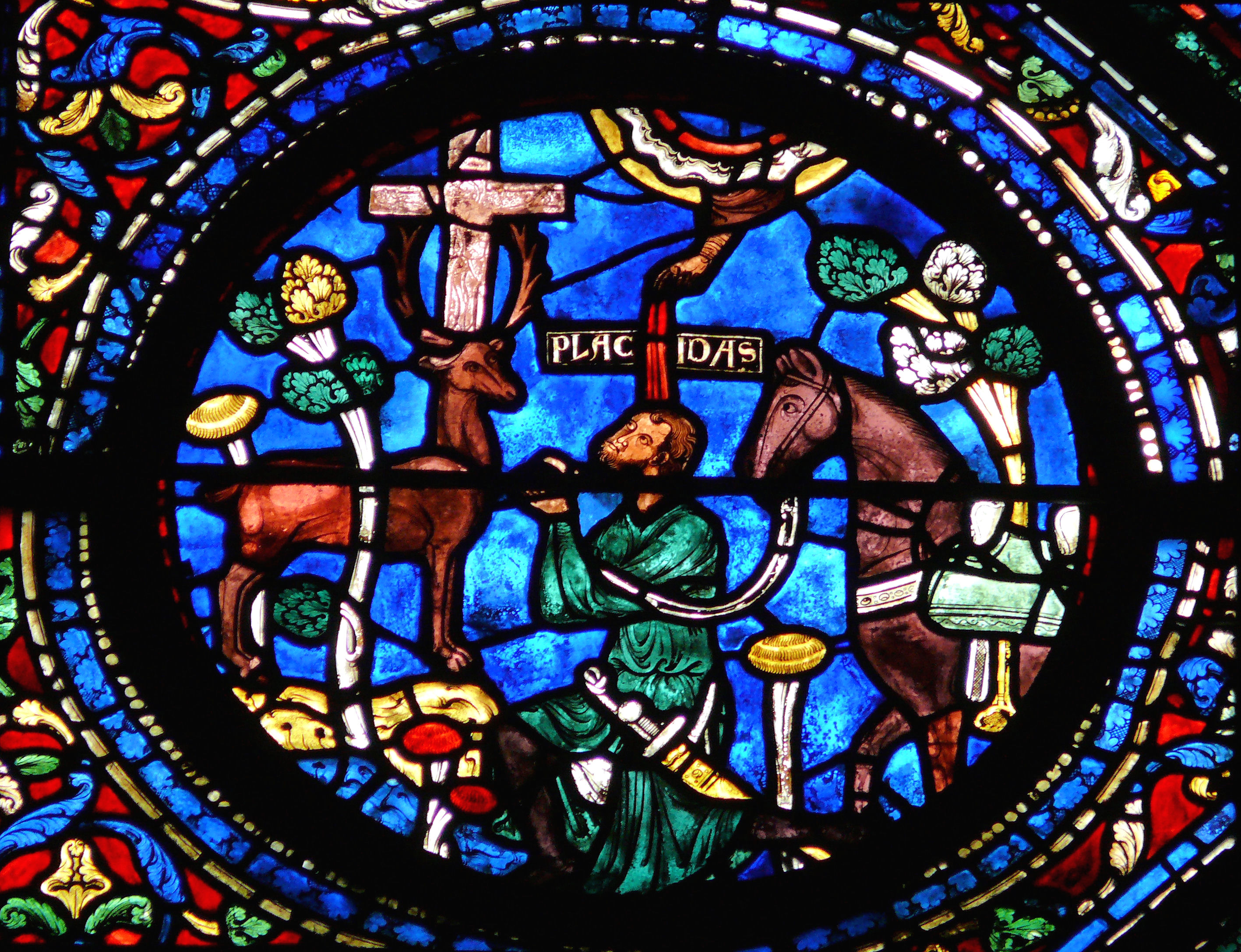
Bay 43
Life of Saint Eustace

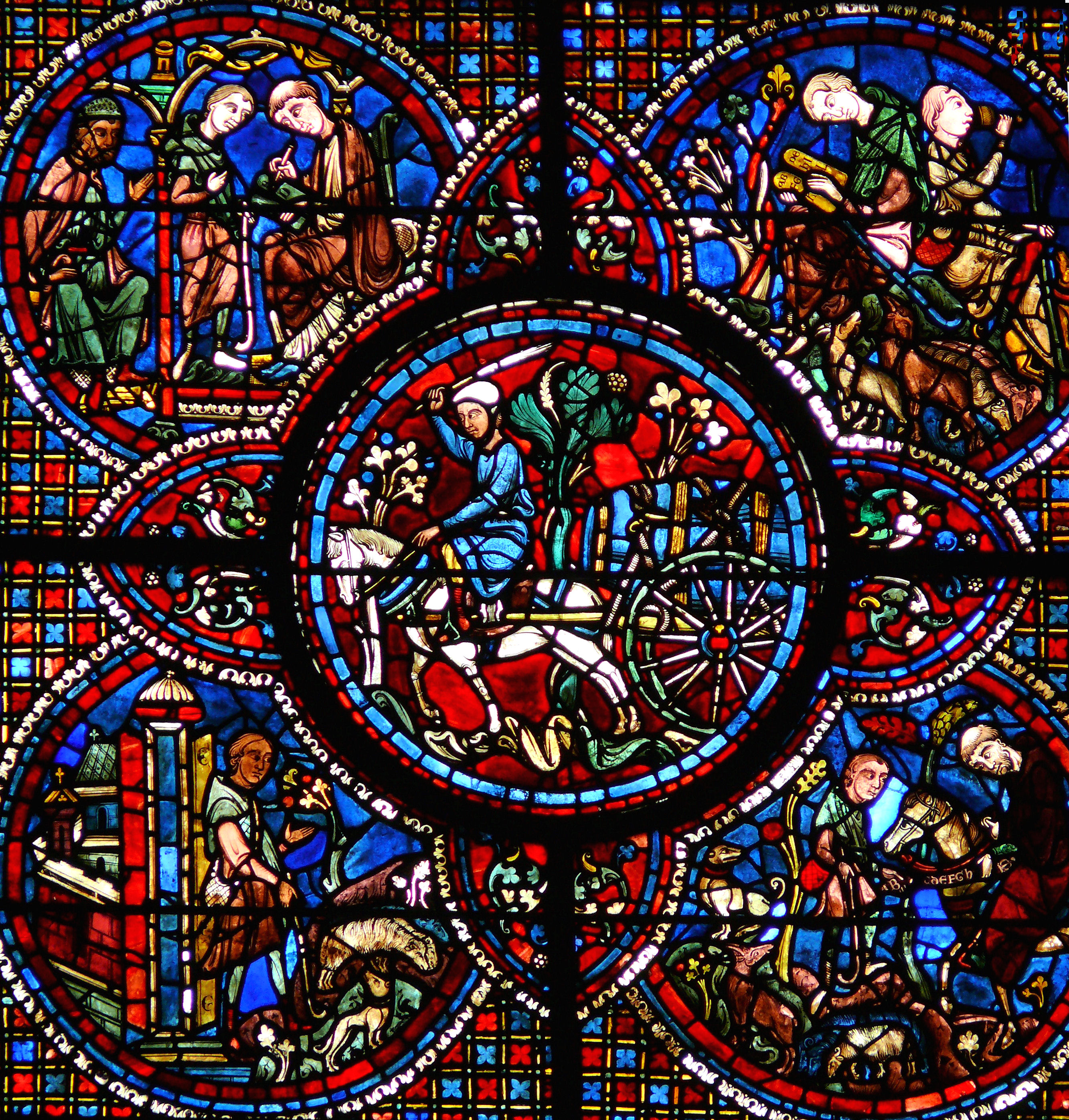
Bay 45
Life of Saint Lubin

=== "Lives" windows ===
Bay	Name	Donors	Dates	Base Palissy	Wikimedia Commons
0	Lives of the Apostles	Bakers	1210–1225	Base Palissy: IM28000390, Ministère français de la Culture. (in French)	Media related to Bay 0 at Wikimedia Commons
1	Lives of Saint Simon and Saint Jude	Henri Noblet, a canon	1220–1225	Base Palissy: IM28000399, Ministère français de la Culture. (in French)	Media related to Bay 1 at Wikimedia Commons
2	Life of Saint Andrew	-	1210–1225	Base Palissy: IM28000398, Ministère français de la Culture. (in French)	Media related to Bay 2 at Wikimedia Commons
3	Grisaille	-	13th century	Base Palissy: PM28000821, Ministère français de la Culture. (in French)	Media related to Bay 3 at Wikimedia Commons
4	Life of Saint Paul	-	1210–1225	Base Palissy: IM28000517, Ministère français de la Culture. (in French)	Media related to Bay 4 at Wikimedia Commons
5	Life of Saint James the Great	Furriers and drapers	1210–1225	Base Palissy: IM28000391, Ministère français de la Culture. (in French)	Media related to Bay 5 at Wikimedia Commons
6	Grisaille: Saint Piat	John II of France	1350–1360	Base Palissy: PM28000819, Ministère français de la Culture. (in French)	Media related to Bay 6 at Wikimedia Commons
7	Life of Charlemagne	Furriers	1225	Base Palissy: IM28000516, Ministère français de la Culture. (in French)	Media related to Bay 7 at Wikimedia Commons
8	Life of Saint Sylvester	Masons and stone-cutters	1210–1225	Base Palissy: IM28000519, Ministère français de la Culture. (in French)	Media related to Bay 8 at Wikimedia Commons
9	Lives of Saint Theodore and Saint Vincent	-	1210–1225	Base Palissy: PM28000818, Ministère français de la Culture. (in French)	Media related to Bay 9 at Wikimedia Commons
10	Grisaille	-	13th century – 1417	Base Palissy: IM28000518, Ministère français de la Culture. (in French)	Media related to Bay 10 at Wikimedia Commons
11	Life of Saint Pantaleon	Nicolas Li (or Le) Sesne	1220–1225	Base Palissy: IM28000396, Ministère français de la Culture. (in French)	Media related to Bay 11 at Wikimedia Commons
12	Life of Saint Remy	-	1210–1225	Base Palissy: PM28000818, Ministère français de la Culture. (in French)	Media related to Bay 12 at Wikimedia Commons
13	Histoire de saint Étienne	Shoemakers	1220–1225	Base Palissy: IM28000394, Ministère français de la Culture. (in French)	Media related to Bay 13 at Wikimedia Commons
14	Life and Miracles of Saint Nicolas	-	1215–1225	Base Palissy: IM28000470, Ministère français de la Culture. (in French)	Media related to Bay 14 at Wikimedia Commons
15	Life of Saint Chéron	Sculptors and stone cutters	1220–1225	Base Palissy: IM28000395, Ministère français de la Culture. (in French)	Media related to Bay 15 at Wikimedia Commons
16	Lives of Saint Margaret and Saint Catherine	-	1210–1225	Base Palissy: PM28000818, Ministère français de la Culture. (in French)	Media related to Bay 16 at Wikimedia Commons
17	Lives of Saint Savinian et Potentian	-	1210–1225	Base Palissy: PM28000818, Ministère français de la Culture. (in French)	Media related to Bay 17 at Wikimedia Commons
18	Life of Saint Thomas Becket	Tanners	1215–1225	Base Palissy: IM28000393, Ministère français de la Culture. (in French)	Media related to Bay 18 at Wikimedia Commons
19	Grisaille	-	c. 1240	Base Palissy: PM28000821, Ministère français de la Culture. (in French)	Media related to Bay 19 at Wikimedia Commons
20	Life of Saint Martin	Curlers	1215–1225	Base Palissy: IM28000392, Ministère français de la Culture. (in French)	Media related to Bay 20 at Wikimedia Commons
21	Life of Saint Julian the Hospitaller	-	1210–1225	Base Palissy: PM28000818, Ministère français de la Culture. (in French)	Media related to Bay 21 at Wikimedia Commons
22	Grisaille	-	16th century	Base Palissy: PM28000820, Ministère français de la Culture. (in French)	Media related to Bay 22 at Wikimedia Commons
23	Life of Saint Thomas the Apostle	-	1210–1240	Base Palissy: PM28000818, Ministère français de la Culture. (in French)	Media related to Bay 23 at Wikimedia Commons
24	Grisaille	-	16th century	Base Palissy: PM28000820, Ministère français de la Culture. (in French)	Media related to Bay 24 at Wikimedia Commons
25	2 lancets in grisaille below an oculus of Enthroned Christ Blessing	-	1230–1250	Base Palissy: PM28000821, Ministère français de la Culture. (in French)	Media related to Bay 25 at Wikimedia Commons
26	Window of the Annunciation; Oculus: Christ Enthroned Blessing	-	13th century	Base Palissy: PM28000821, Ministère français de la Culture. (in French)	Media related to Bay 26 at Wikimedia Commons
27	2 lancets in grisaille below an oculus of Enthroned Christ Blessing	-	1230–1250	Base Palissy: PM28000821, Ministère français de la Culture. (in French)	Media related to Bay 27 at Wikimedia Commons
28	2 lancets Left: Zodiac and Works of the Months; Right: Life of the Virgin Mary; Oculus: Christ Blessing, Alpha and Omega	Theobald VI, Count of Chartres; Vine-growers	1217–1220	Base Palissy: IM28000515, Ministère français de la Culture. (in French)	Media related to Galerie du zodiaque at Wikimedia Commons; Media related to Bay 28 droite at Wikimedia Commons
29	2 lancets: 1- Miracles of Saint Nicolas, 2- Life of Saint Germanus of Auxerre, below an oculus of Christ Blessing with a Tetramorph.	Geoffroy Chardonel, canon Étienne Chardonel, canon	1225–1235	Base Palissy: IM28000521, Ministère français de la Culture. (in French)	Media related to Bay 29 at Wikimedia Commons
30	2 lancets Left: "Notre-Dame de la Belle Verrière"; Right: Lives of Saint Anthony and Saint Paul	- Fishermen	1180; 1215–1220	Base Palissy: IM28000465, Ministère français de la Culture. (in French)	Media related to Bay 30 (left) at Wikimedia Commons; Media related to Bay 30 (right) at Wikimedia Commons
31	Window symbolising the reconciliation between God and humanity	Association allemande des Amis de la Cathédrale de Chartres	1971; Lorin	Base Palissy: PM28000807, Ministère français de la Culture. (in French)	Media related to Bay 31 at Wikimedia Commons
32	Life of Saint Fulbert	American architects	1954, Lorin workshop	Base Palissy: PM28000807, Ministère français de la Culture. (in French)	Media related to Bay 32 at Wikimedia Commons
33	Vegetal decoration	-	12th and 13th centuries, 1964 Lorin workshop	Base Palissy: PM28000807, Ministère français de la Culture. (in French)	Media related to Bay 33 at Wikimedia Commons
34	Grisaille; Fragment of a Resurrection of Lazarus	-	Late 15th or early 16th century, grisaille by C.Lorin in 1924	Base Palissy: PM28000807, Ministère français de la Culture. (in French)	Media related to Bay 34 at Wikimedia Commons
35	Parable of the Prodigal Son	-	1205–1215	Base Palissy: IM28000467, Ministère français de la Culture. (in French)	Media related to Bay 35 at Wikimedia Commons
36	Life of Saint Apollinarius	Thierry, canon	1205–1215, 1328	Base Palissy: IM28000468, Ministère français de la Culture. (in French)	Media related to Bay 36 at Wikimedia Commons
37	Typological passion	Master-ironworkers	1205–1215	Base Palissy: IM28000464, Ministère français de la Culture. (in French)	Media related to Bay 37 at Wikimedia Commons
38	Miracles of the Virgin Mary	Butchers	1205–1215	Base Palissy: IM28000469, Ministère français de la Culture. (in French)	Media related to Bay 38 at Wikimedia Commons
39	Life and Miracles of Saint Nicolas	Apothecaries	1220–1225	Base Palissy: IM28000463, Ministère français de la Culture. (in French)	Media related to Bay 39 at Wikimedia Commons
40	The Vendôme Family	Louis, Count of Vendôme	1417	Base Palissy: IM28000404, Ministère français de la Culture. (in French)	Media related to Bay 40 at Wikimedia Commons
41	Life of Joseph	Money-changers	1205–1215	Base Palissy: IM28000476, Ministère français de la Culture. (in French)	Media related to Bay 41 at Wikimedia Commons
42	Death and Assumption of the Virgin Mary	Shoemakers	1205–1215	Base Palissy: IM28000405, Ministère français de la Culture. (in French)	Media related to Bay 42 at Wikimedia Commons
43	Life of Saint Eustace	Drapers and furriers	1210	Base Palissy: IM28000475, Ministère français de la Culture. (in French)	Media related to Bay 43 at Wikimedia Commons
44	Parable of the Good Samaritan	Shoemakers	1205–1215	Base Palissy: IM28000406, Ministère français de la Culture. (in French)	Media related to Galerie du Bon Samaritain at Wikimedia Commons
45	Life of Saint Lubin	Wine merchants	1205–1215	Base Palissy: IM28000474, Ministère français de la Culture. (in French)	Media related to Bay 45 at Wikimedia Commons
46	Life of Saint Mary Magdalene	Water carriers	1205–1215	Base Palissy: IM28000407, Ministère français de la Culture. (in French)	Media related to Bay 46 at Wikimedia Commons
47	Life of Noah	Carpenters, wheelwrights and coopers	1205–1215	Base Palissy: IM28000473, Ministère français de la Culture. (in French)	Media related to Bay 47 at Wikimedia Commons
48	Life of Saint John the Evangelist	Armourers	1205–1215	Base Palissy: IM28000408, Ministère français de la Culture. (in French)	Media related to Bay 48 at Wikimedia Commons
49	Tree of Jesse	-	1145–1155	Base Palissy: PM28000797, Ministère français de la Culture. (in French)	Media related to Bay 49 at Wikimedia Commons
50	Nativity and Life of Christ	-	1145–1155	Base Palissy: PM28000797, Ministère français de la Culture. (in French)	Media related to Bay 50 at Wikimedia Commons
51	Passion	-	1145–1155	Base Palissy: PM28000797, Ministère français de la Culture. (in French)	Media related to Bay 51 at Wikimedia Commons

== Upper windows ==
There are 44 upper windows (0 to 43). Except the seven windows of the apse (each consisting of a single lancet) and those in bay 132 (whose lancets were walled-in in the 16th century to install the main organ), all the base of the upper level are made up of 2 lancets below a rose, which brings the number of windows to 68. The small rose windows to the south and north are each counted as a single window due to their specific composition.

=== Nave - south side ===
All these windows were restored by Coffetier between 1873 and 1883. Bay 132 was walled in to install the main organ.

Upper Windows, South Side of the Nave, left to right: Bays 130, 134, 136, 138, 140 and 142

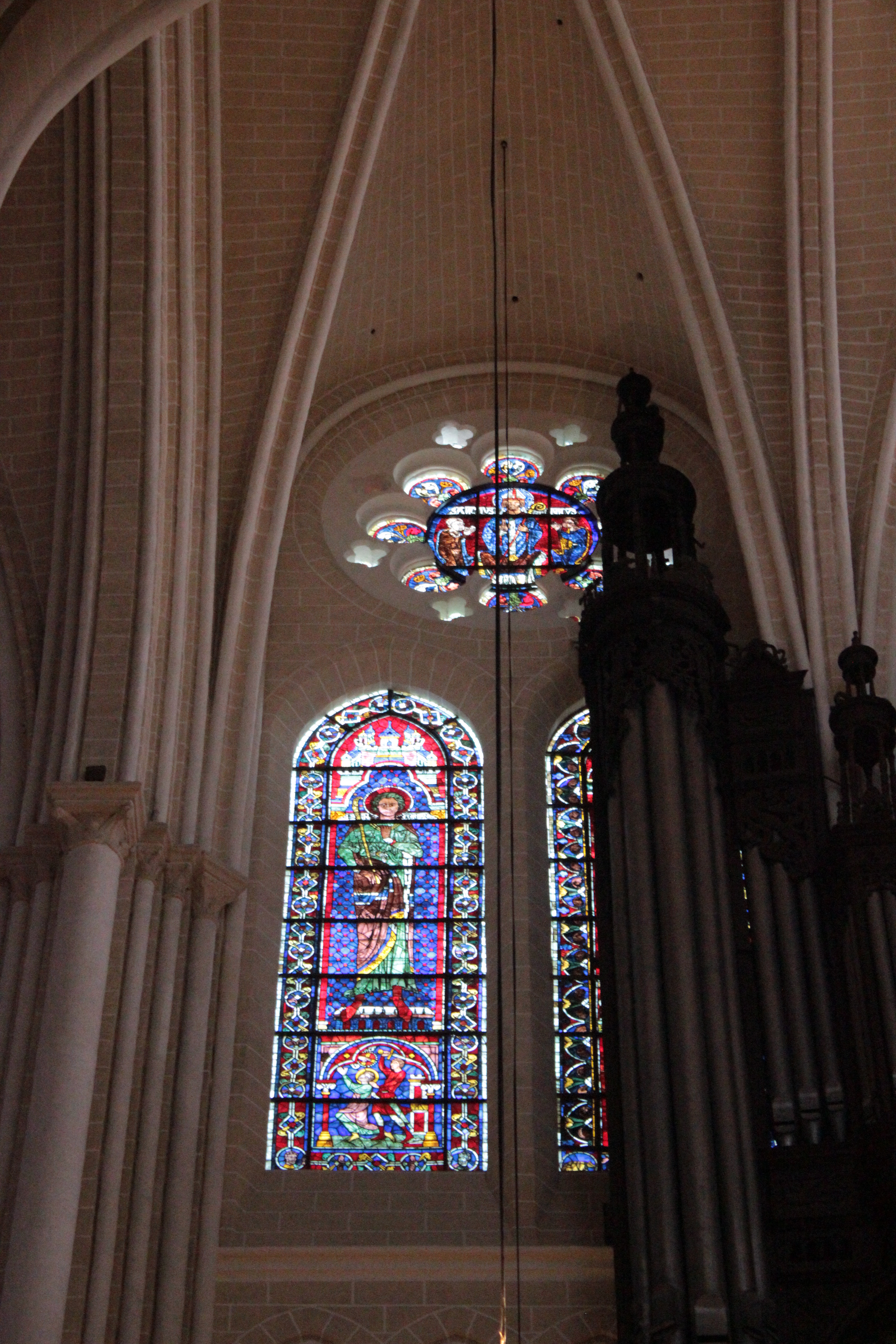
Bay 130

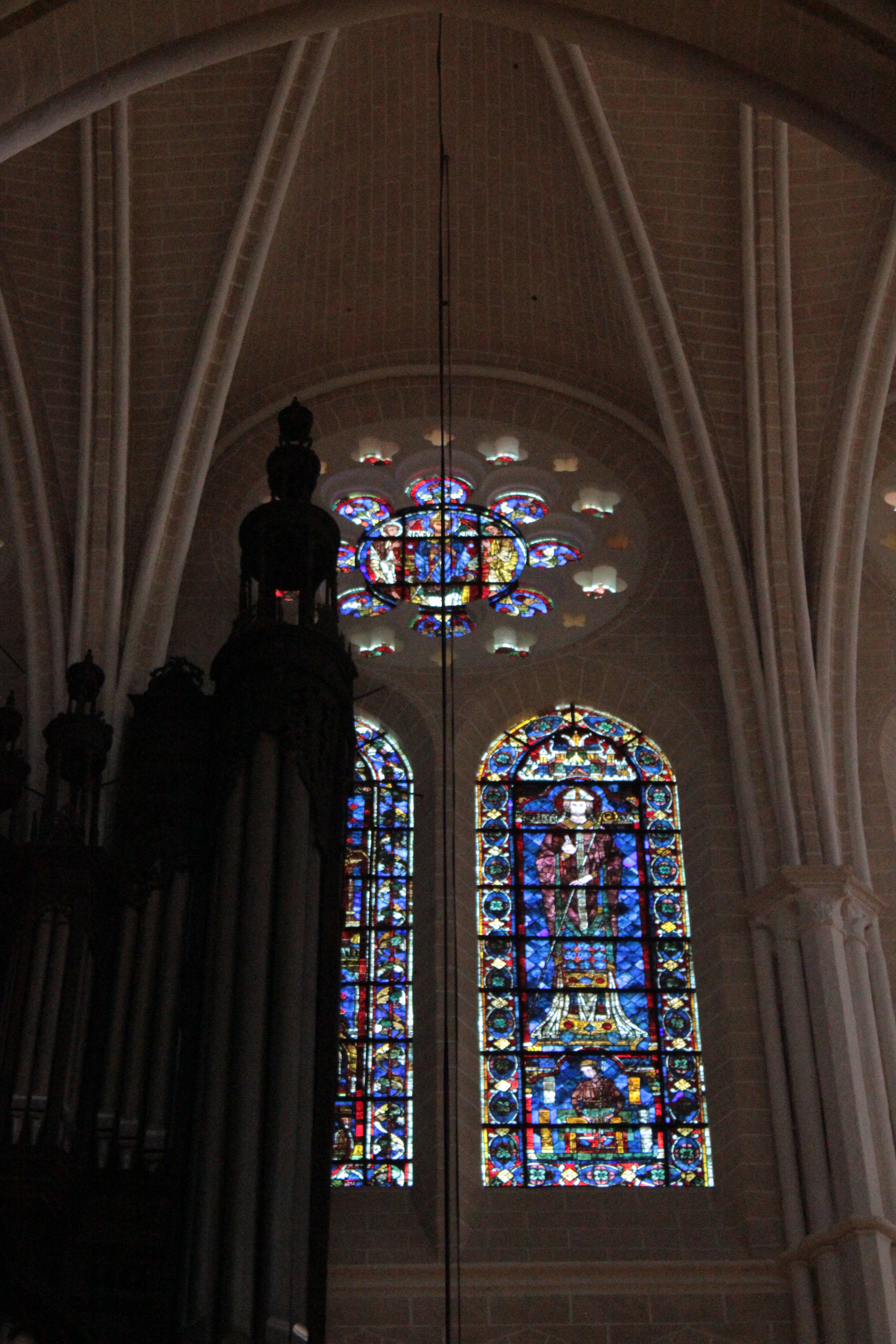
Bay 134

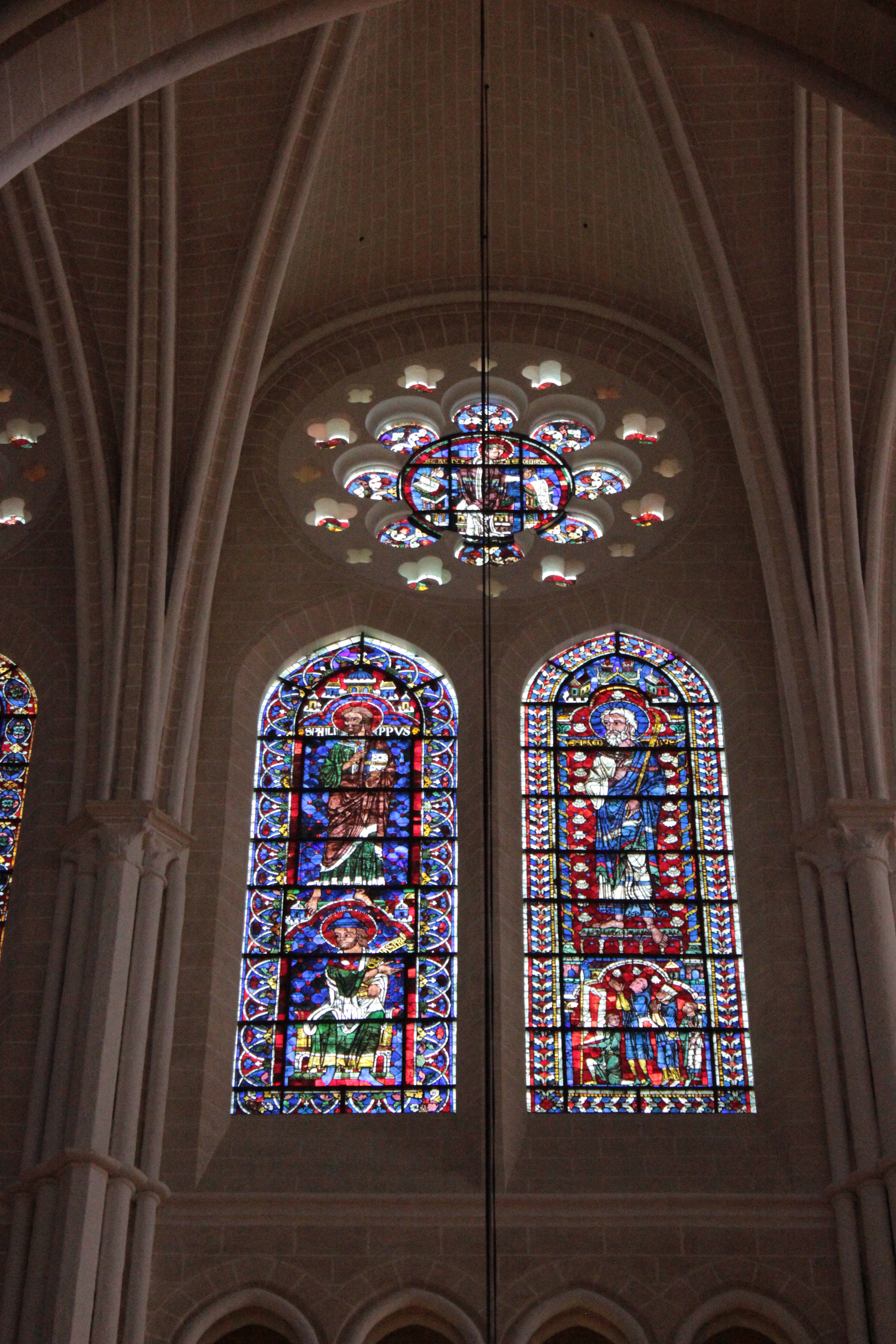
Bay 136

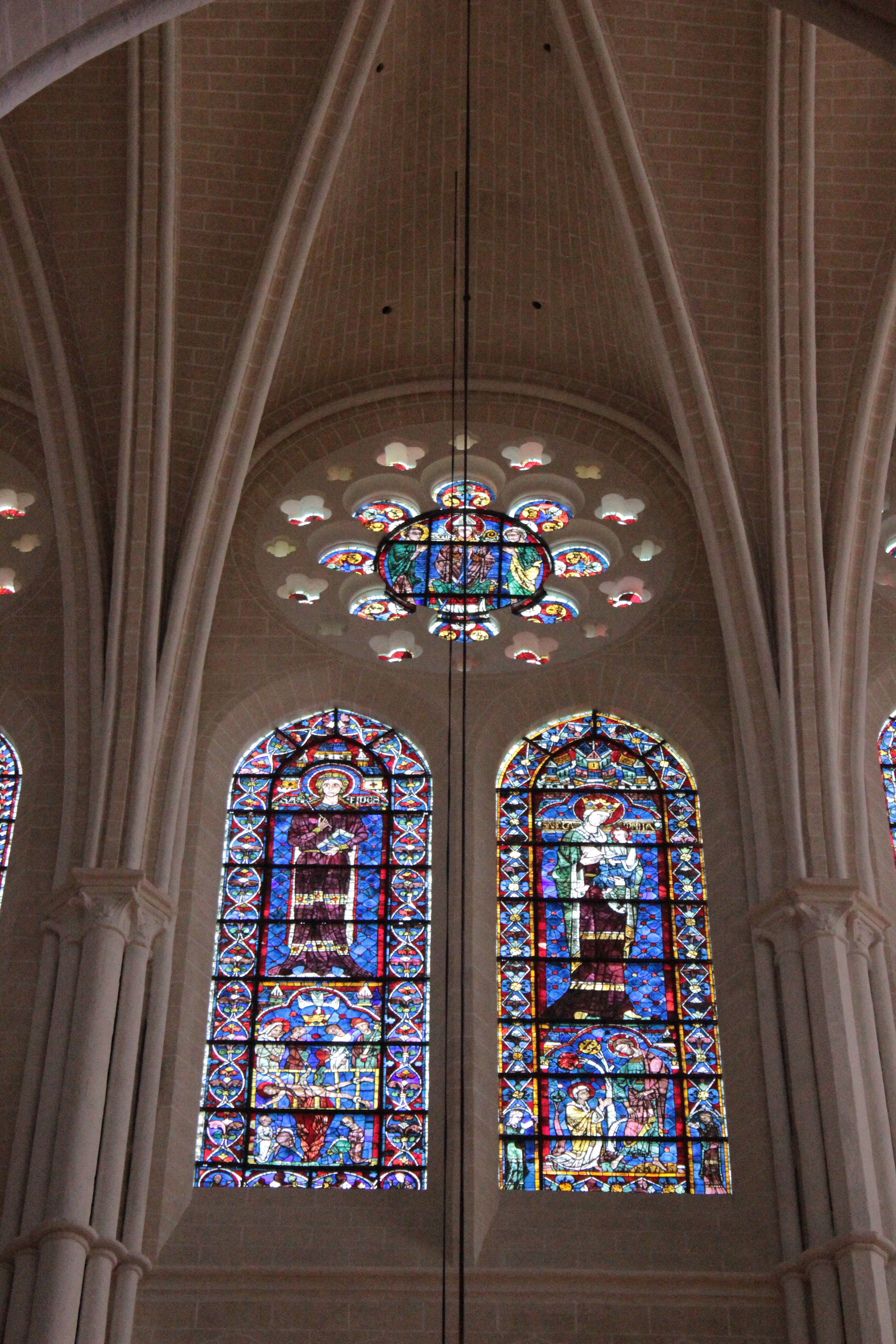
Bay 138

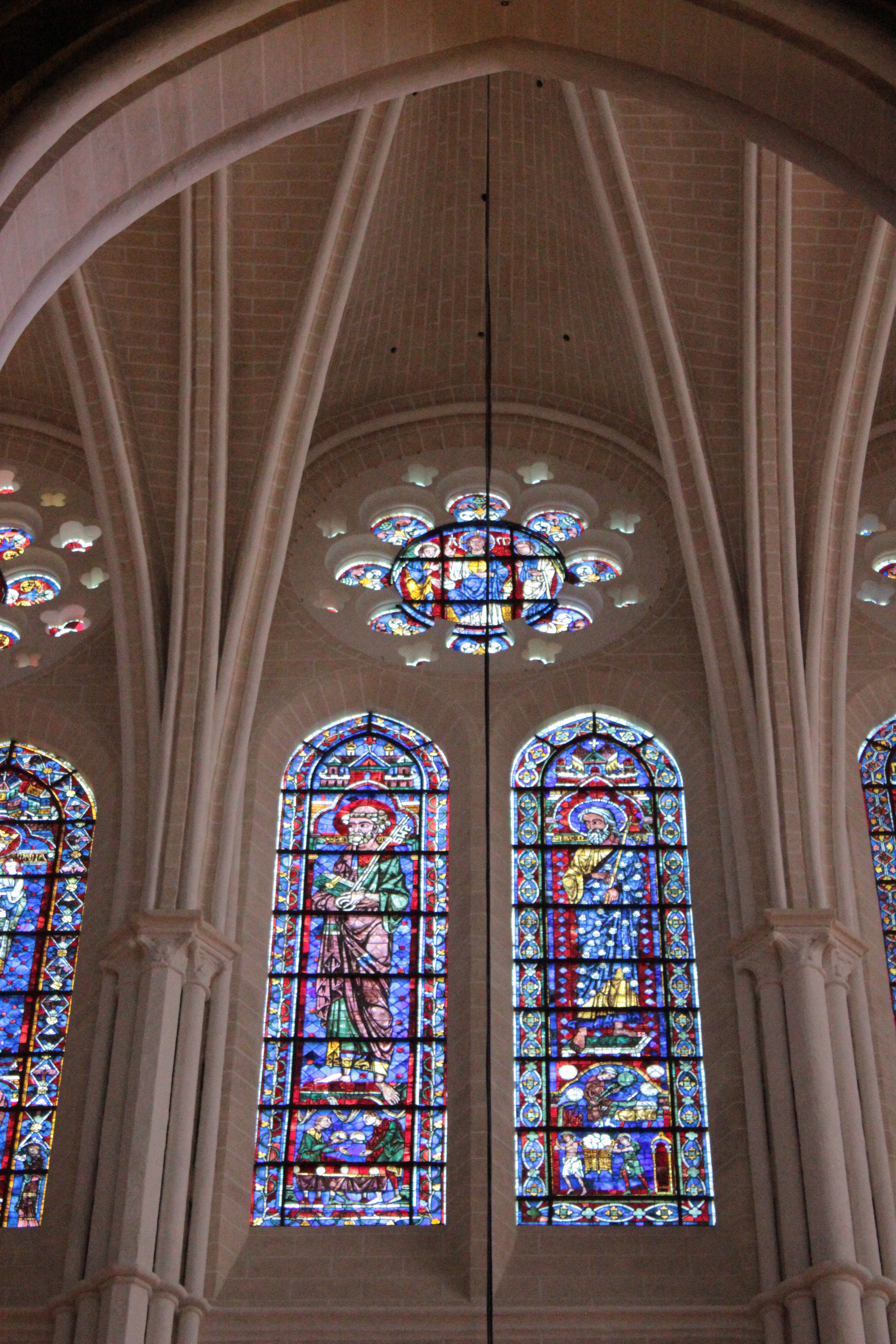
Bay 140

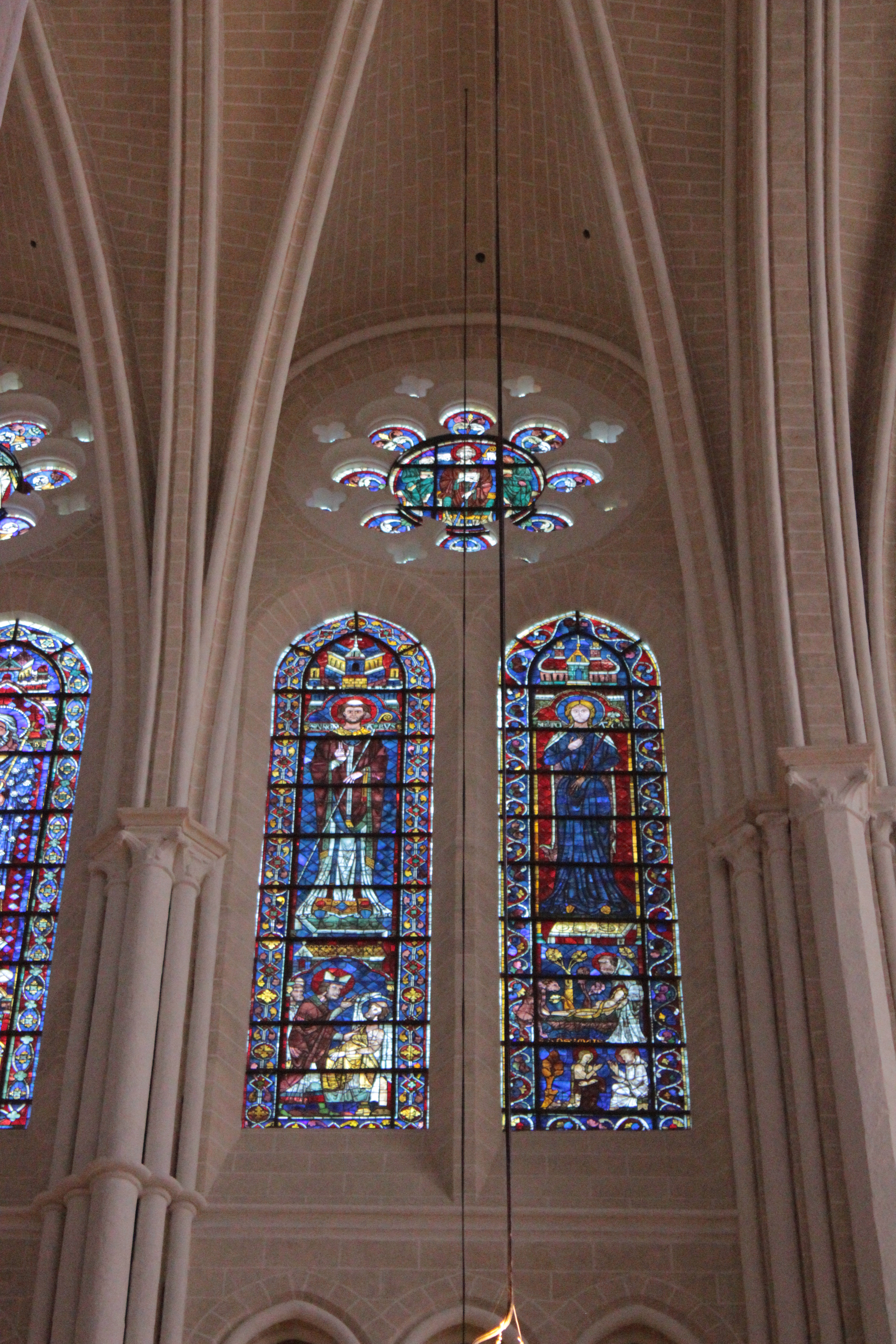
Bay 142

Bay	Title	Donors	Dates	Base Palissy	Wikimedia Commons
142	Rose: Abbot saint Left: Saint Lomer; Right: Saint Mary of Egypt	-	1205–1215	Base Palissy: PM28000811, Ministère français de la Culture. (in French)	Media related to Bay 142 at Wikimedia Commons
140	Rose: Christ trônant Left: Saint Peter; Right: Saint James the Great	Bakers	1205–1215	Base Palissy: PM28000811, Ministère français de la Culture. (in French)	Media related to Bay 140 at Wikimedia Commons
138	Rose: saint Solemnis; Left: Saint Faith; Right: Noli me tangere, Madonna Lactans	Two female donors	1205–1215	Base Palissy: PM28000811, Ministère français de la Culture. (in French)	Media related to Bay 138 at Wikimedia Commons
136	Rose: saint Jérôme; Left: Jeremiah, Saint Philip; Right: Saint James the Great	Shoemakers, family of donors	1205–1215	Base Palissy: PM28000811, Ministère français de la Culture. (in French)	Media related to Bay 136 at Wikimedia Commons
134	Rose: saint Augustin; Left: Moses, Saint Bartholomew; Right: Saint Calétric	Turners, one donor	1205–1215	Base Palissy: PM28000811, Ministère français de la Culture. (in French)	Media related to Bay 134 at Wikimedia Commons
132	Rose: Saint Gregory the Great	-	1205–1215	Base Palissy: PM28000811, Ministère français de la Culture. (in French)	Media related to Main organs at Wikimedia Commons
130	Rose: Saint Hilary of Poitiers; Left: saint Symphorian; Right: Two saints	Two donors	1205–1215	Base Palissy: PM28000811, Ministère français de la Culture. (in French)	Media related to Bay 130 at Wikimedia Commons

=== North Transept ===
North Transept

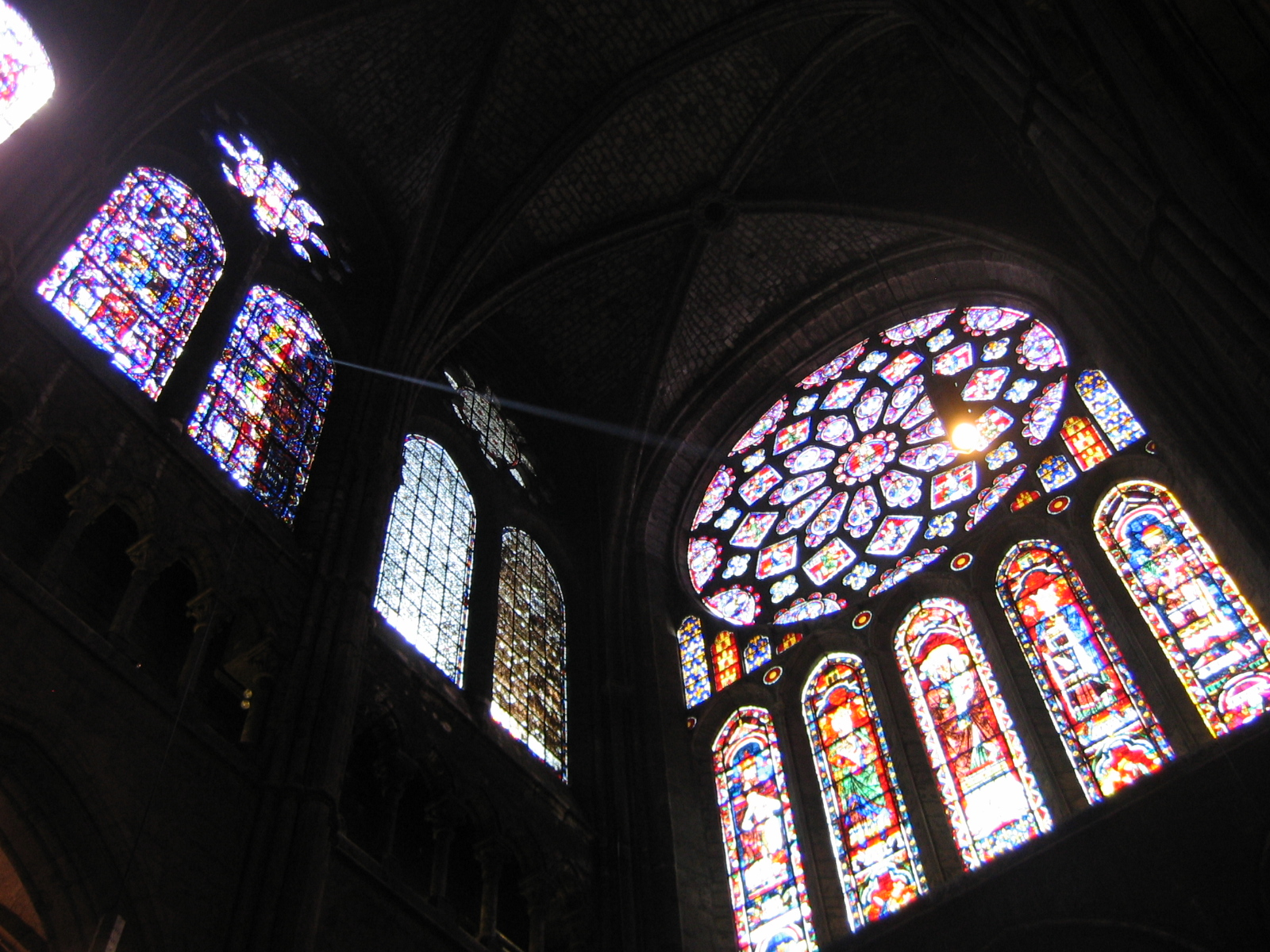
North rose window and Bays 125 (left) and 123 (right)

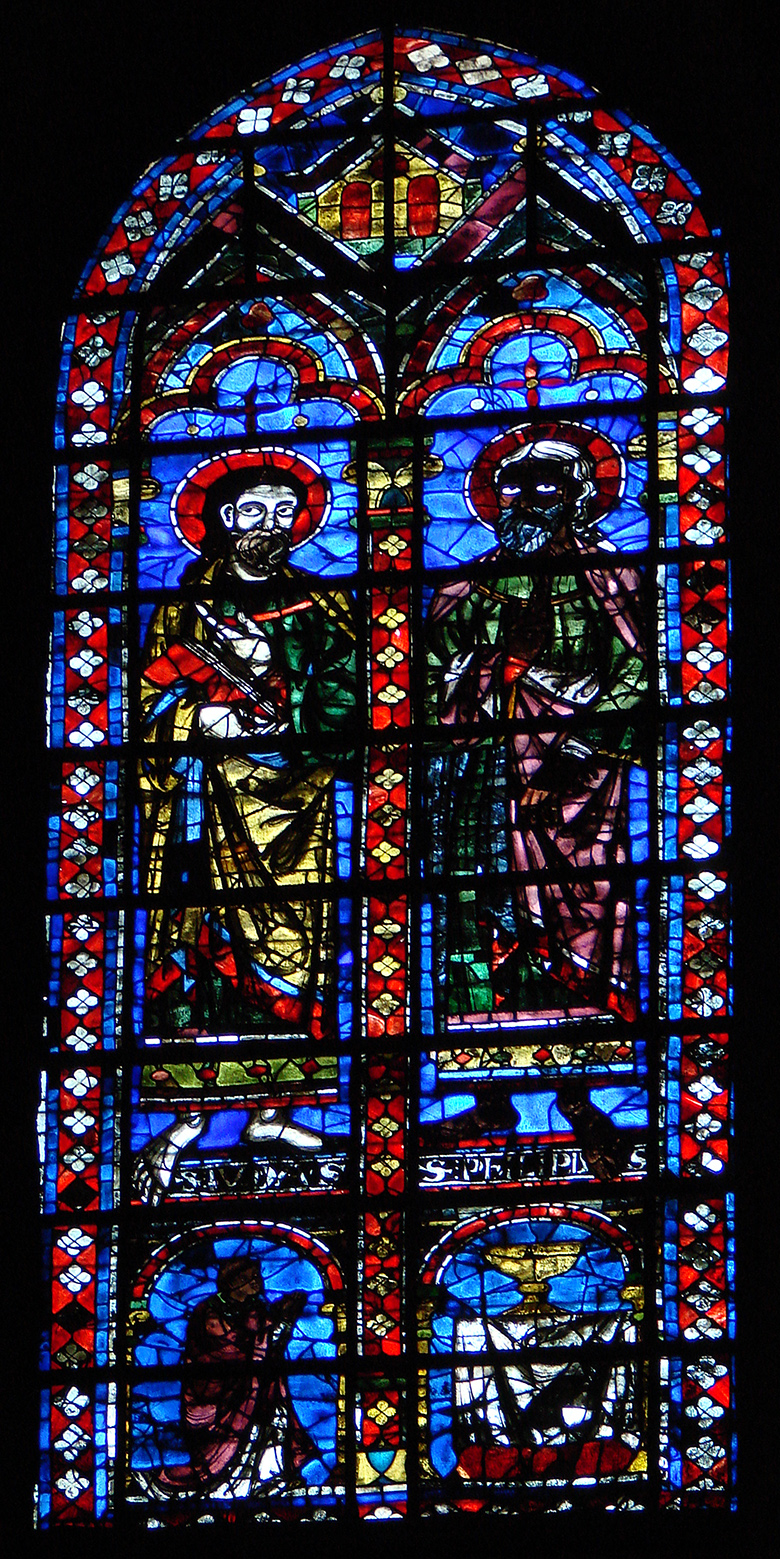
Bay 117, right half:
Saint Philip and Saint Jude

Bay	Title	Donors	Dates	Base Palissy	Wikimedia Commons
115	Rose: Christ Enthroned; Left: Saint Eustace; Right: Annunciation, Nativity, Adoration of the Magi	House of Beaumont	1225–1235	Base Palissy: PM28000813, Ministère français de la Culture. (in French)	Media related to Bay 115 at Wikimedia Commons
117	Rose: Priest; Left: Saint Philip and Saint Andrew; Right: Saint Philip and Saint Jude	Two priests	1225–1235	Base Palissy: PM28000813, Ministère français de la Culture. (in French)	Media related to Bay 117 at Wikimedia Commons
119	Rose: Christ Enthroned; Left: Saint Thomas the Apostle and Saint Barnabas; Right: Saint Jude and Saint Thomas the Apostle	Two priests	1225–1235	Base Palissy: PM28000813, Ministère français de la Culture. (in French)	Media related to Bay 119 at Wikimedia Commons
123	Grisaille with the coats of arms of the Kingdom of France and the Kingdom of Castille	-	Late 13th century	Base Palissy: PM28000813, Ministère français de la Culture. (in French)	Media related to Bay 123 at Wikimedia Commons
125	Rose: Left: Annunciation, Visitation; Right: Annunciation to Joachim	Wife and daughter of Philippe de Boulogne	1225–1235; Complered in 1880	Base Palissy: PM28000813, Ministère français de la Culture. (in French)	Media related to Bay 125 at Wikimedia Commons
127	Rose: Philip of Boulogne; Left: Annunciation to the Shepherds, Presentation in the Temple; Right: Death, Assumption and Coronation of the Virgin Mary	Philippe de Boulogne	1225–1235	Base Palissy: PM28000813, Ministère français de la Culture. (in French)	Media related to Bay 127 at Wikimedia Commons

=== Choir and apse ===
==== South Side of the Choir ====
The lancets (but not the rose windows) of bays 108 and 112 were destroyed in the 18th century. Before their destruction, Bay 108 showed scenes from the lives of Saint Bartholomew and the Virgin Mary, whilst Bay 112 showed scenes from those of Saint Eustace and Saint George.

South Side of the Choir

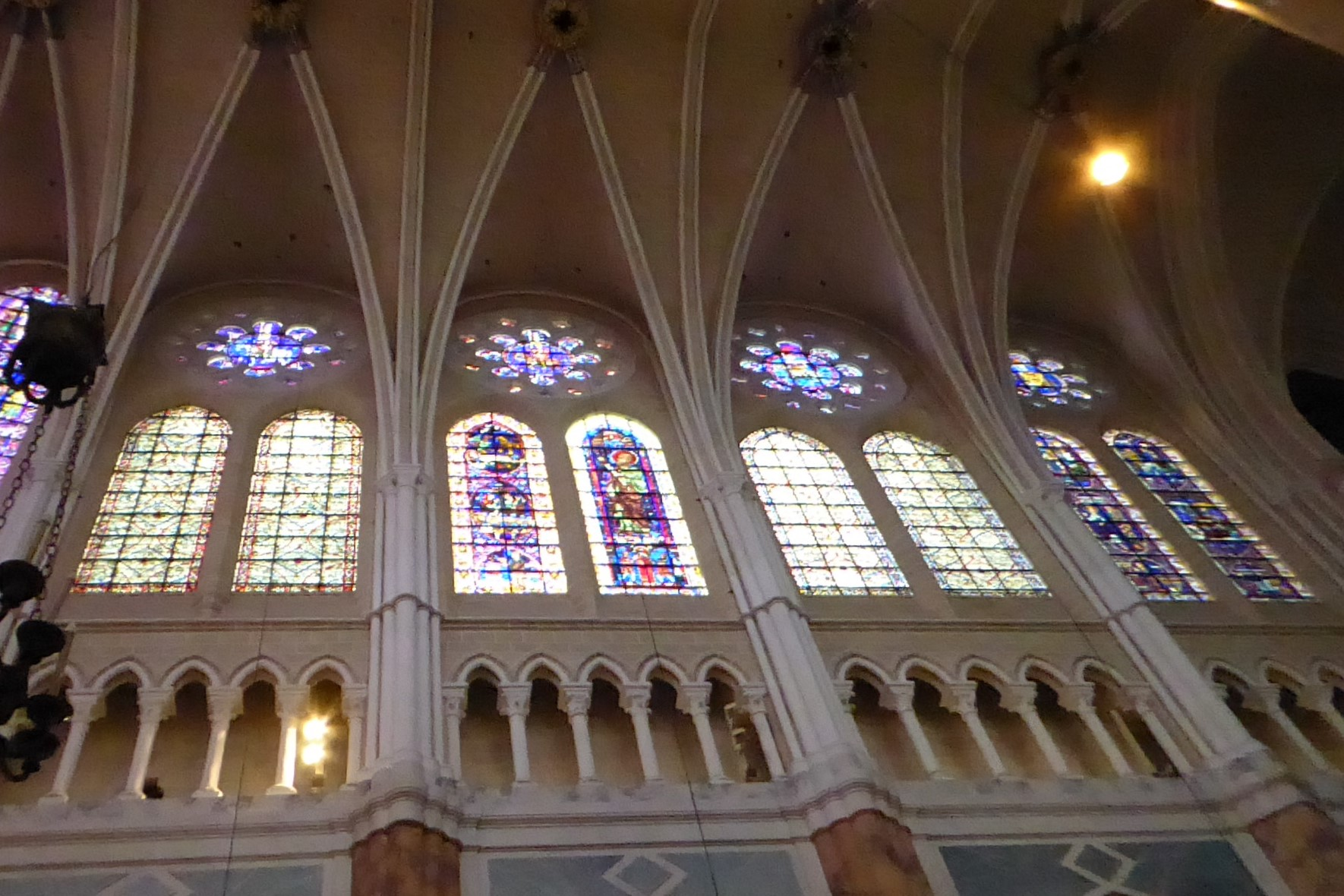
Bays 118, 110, 112, and 114

Bay	Title	Donors	Dates	Base Palissy	Wikimedia Commons
114	Left: Saint John the Evangelist and Saint James the Great; Right: Nativity, Flight into Egypt; Rose: Lord of Beaumont	Bouchard of Marly; Colin	1210–1225; Restored in 1920 and 1921 by Lorin and Gaudin	Base Palissy: PM28000817, Ministère français de la Culture. (in French)	Media related to Bay 114 at Wikimedia Commons
112	Rose: Seigneur de Courtenay; Grisaille	Philippe de Courtenay; Guillaume de Tanlay	1210–1225; Lancets destroyed in 1757, 1773 and 1788; Replaced in 1935–1936 with grisailles by Lorin	Base Palissy: PM28000822, Ministère français de la Culture. (in French)	Media related to Bay 112 at Wikimedia Commons
110	Rose: Seigneur de Montfort; Left: saint Vincent; Right: saint Paul	Pierre Baillart; Tellers	1210–1225; Restored in 1920 and 1921 by Lorin and Gaudin	Base Palissy: PM28000817, Ministère français de la Culture. (in French)	Media related to Bay 110 at Wikimedia Commons
108	Rose: Seigneur de Montfort; Grisaille	Guillaume de la Ferté. Étienne de Sancerre	1210–1225; Lancets destroyed in 1757, 1773 and 1788; Replaced in 1935–1936 with grisailles by Lorin	Base Palissy: PM28000822, Ministère français de la Culture. (in French)	Media related to Bay 108 at Wikimedia Commons

=== Nave - north side ===
Upper windows (north nave, left to right): bays 141, 139, 137, 135, 133, 131, and 129

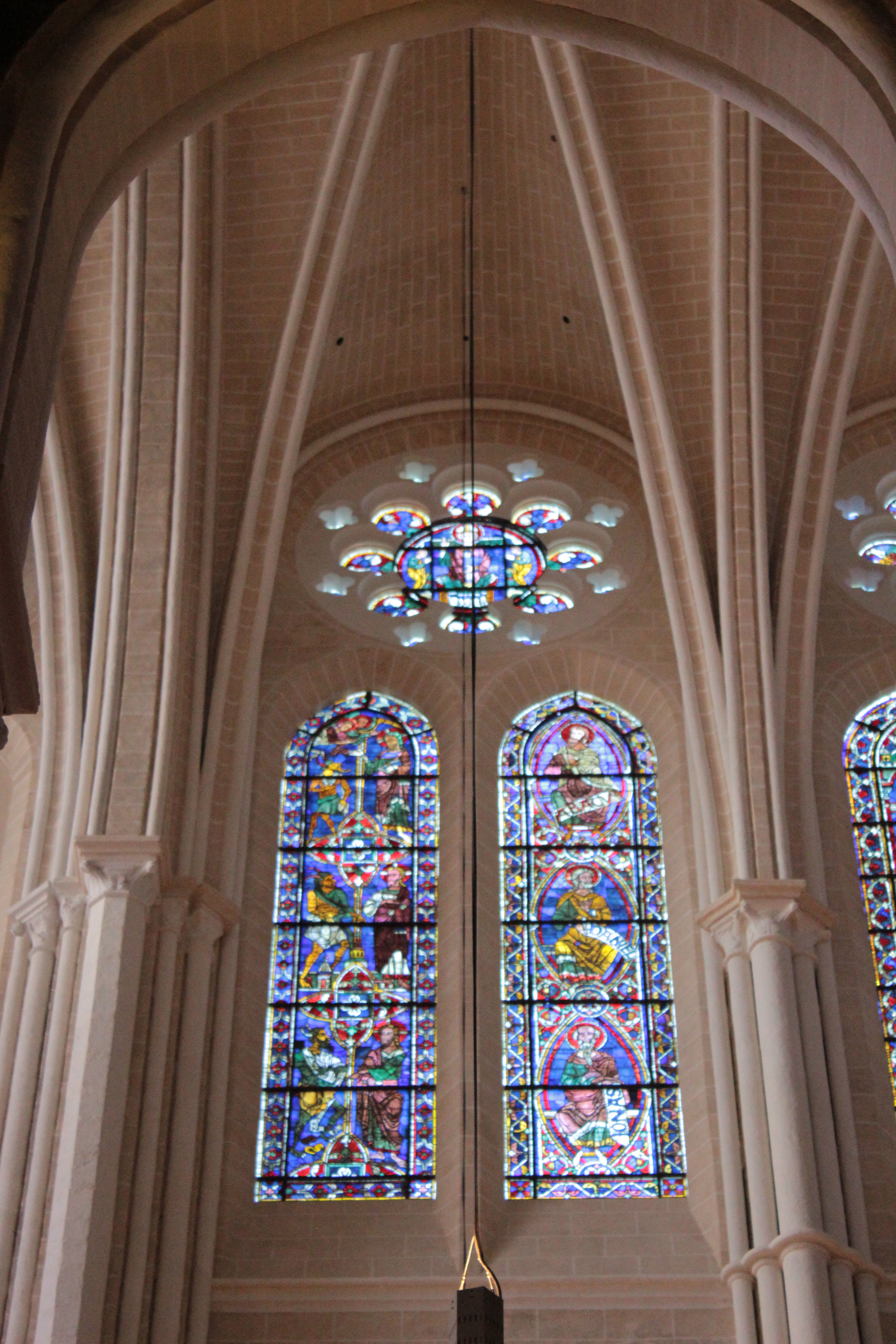
Bay 141

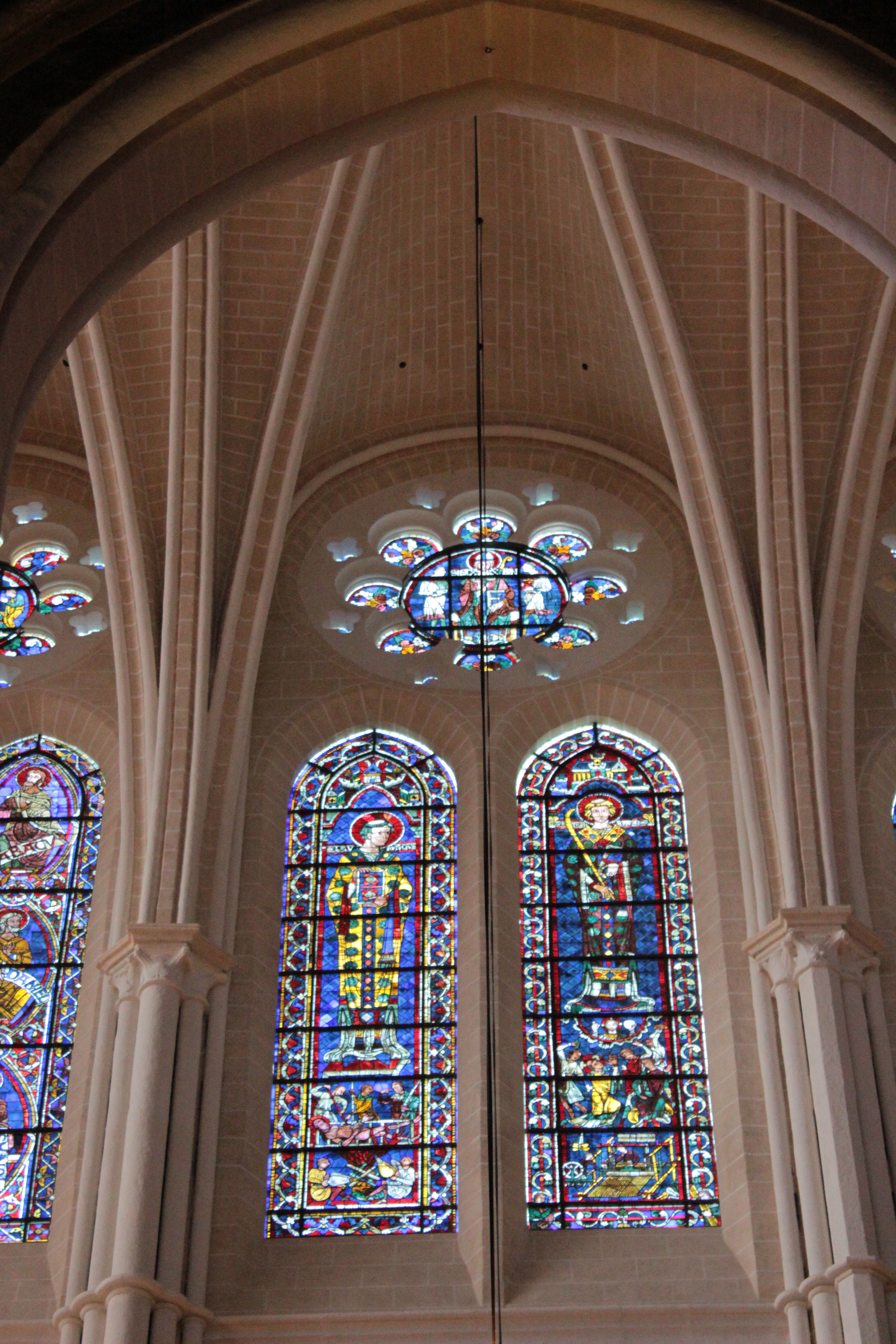
Bay 139

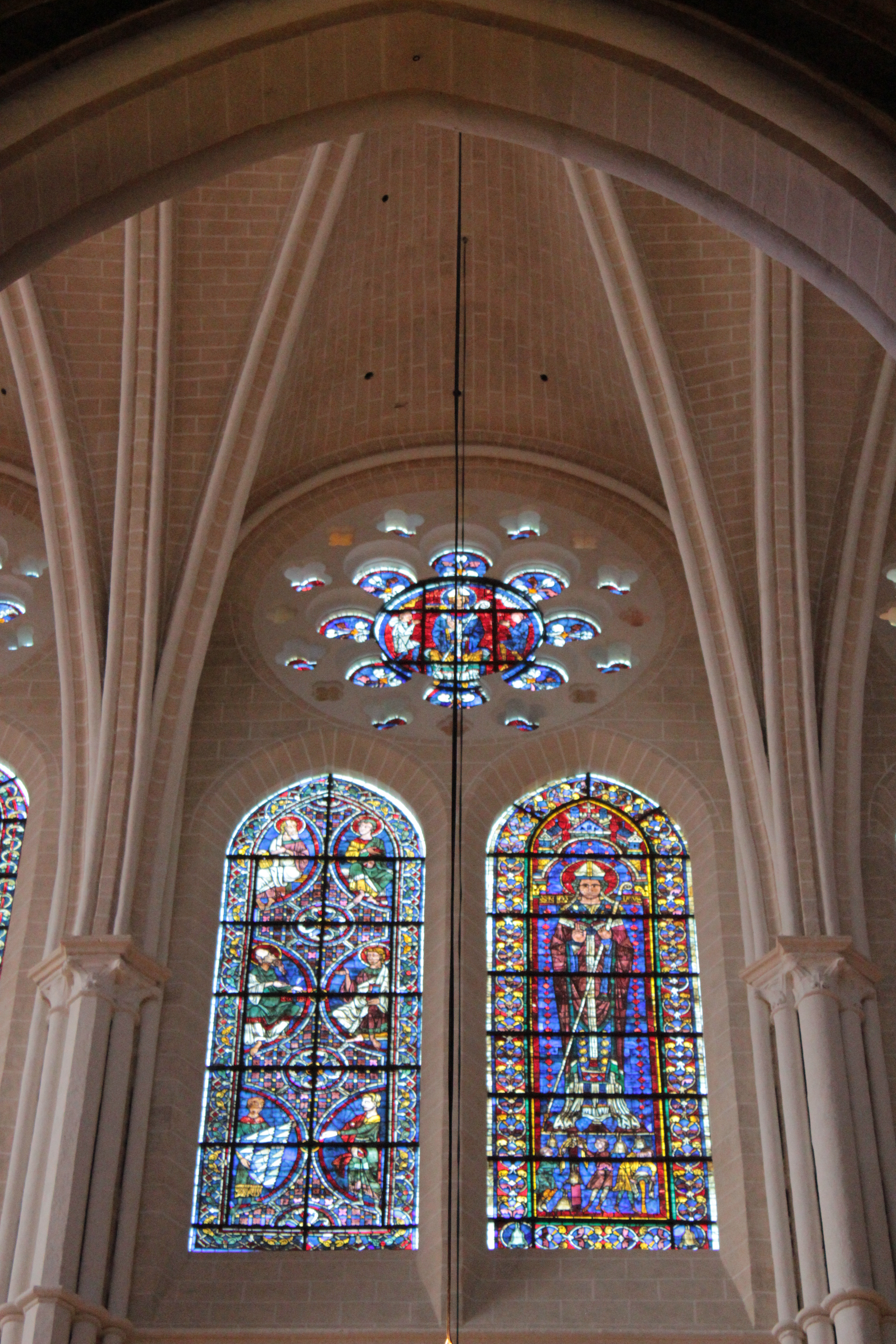
Bay 137

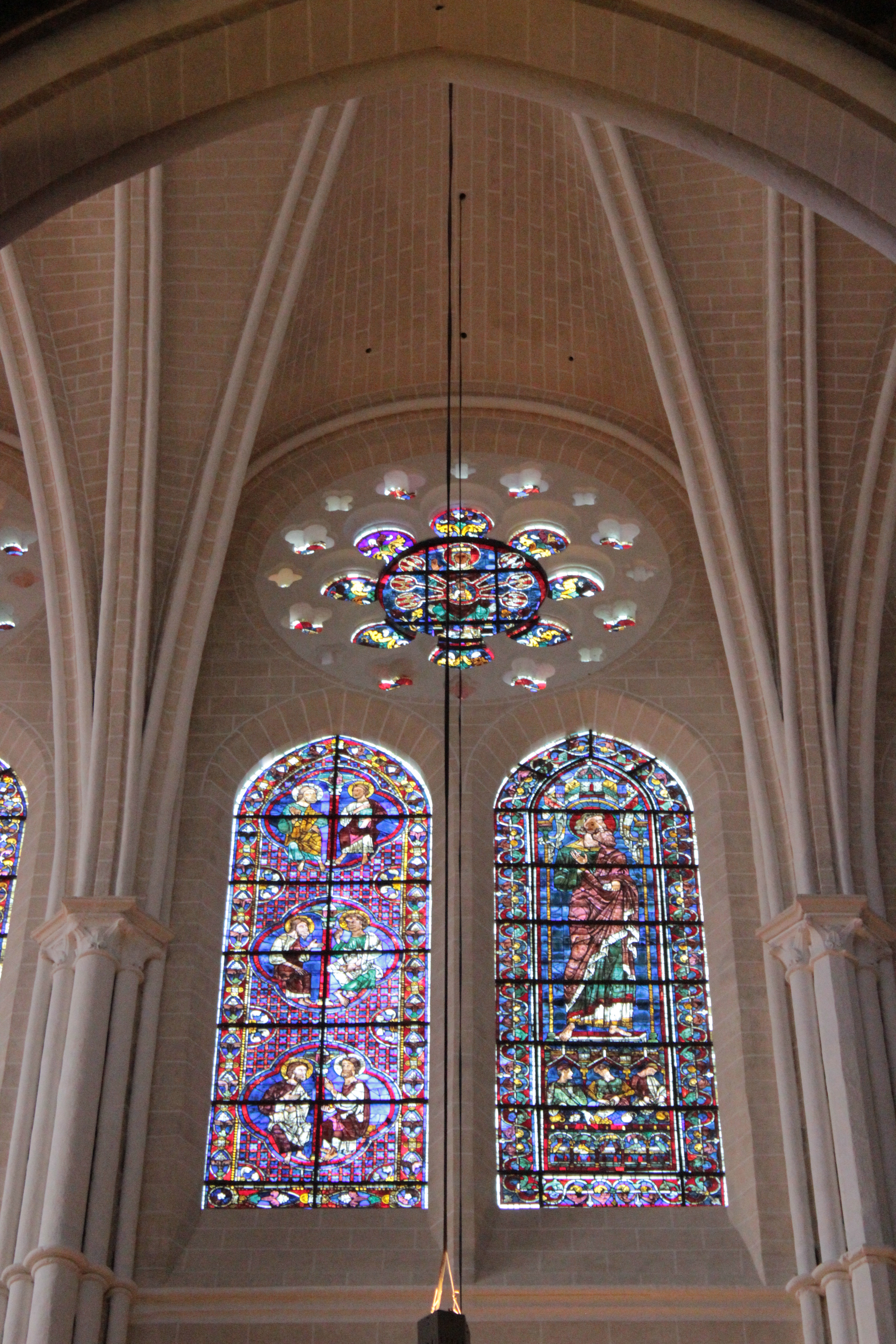
Bay 135

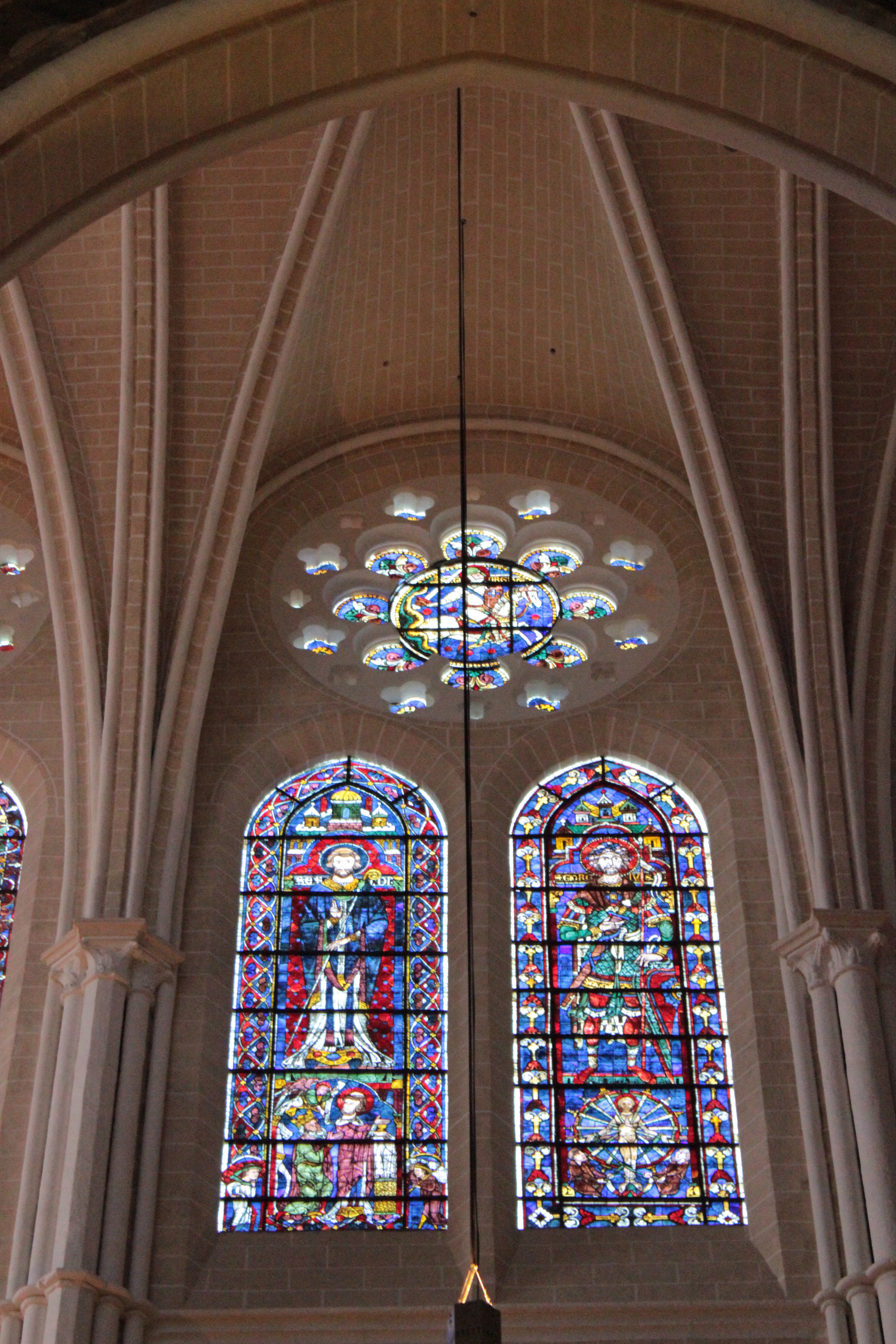
Bay 133

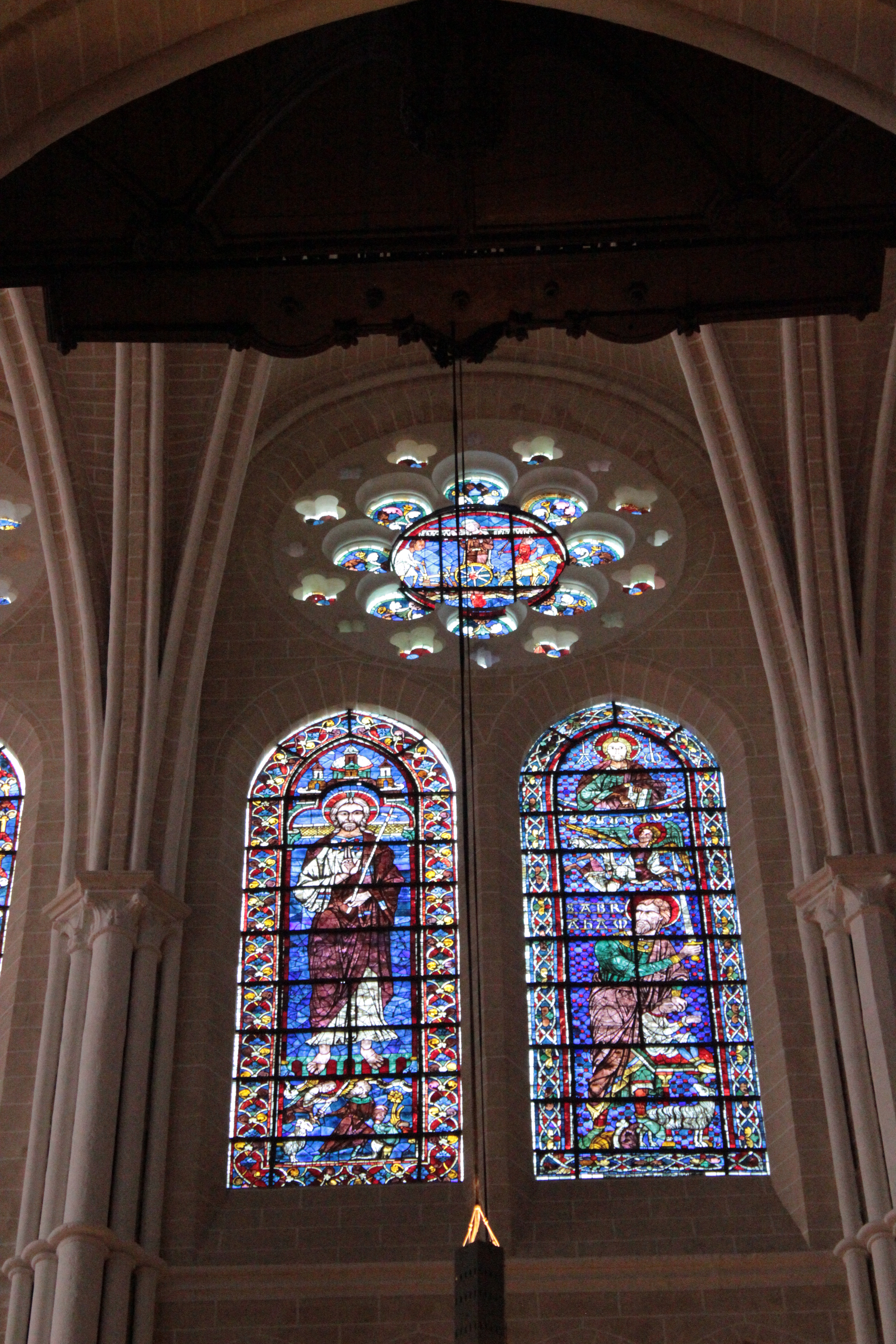
Bay 131

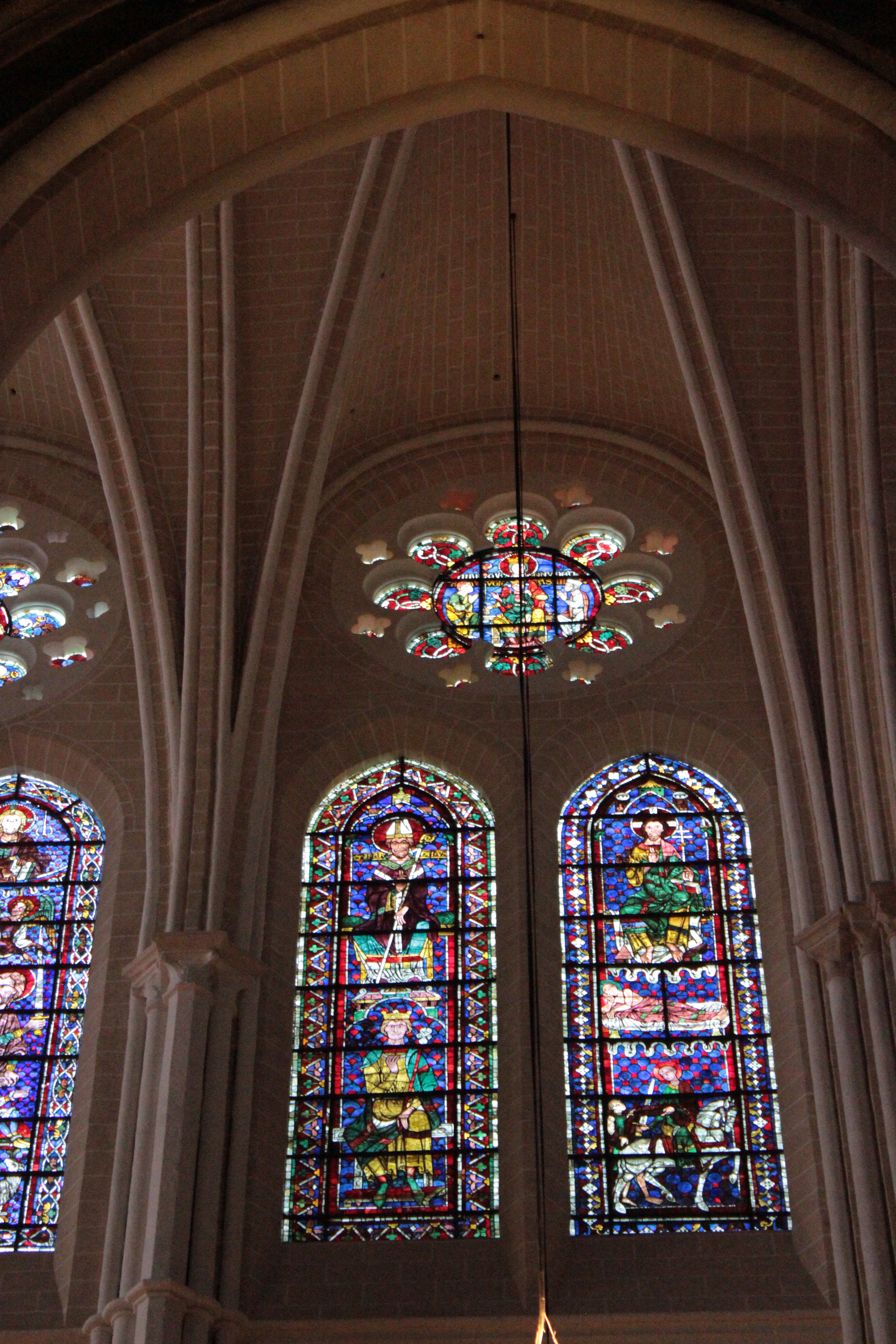
Bay 129

Bay	Title	Donors	Dates	Base Palissy	Wikimedia Commons
129	Rose: Madonna and Child; Left and right: Life of Saint Martin	Bourgeois of Tours	1205–1215	Base Palissy: PM28000811, Ministère français de la Culture. (in French)	Media related to Bay 129 at Wikimedia Commons
131	Rose: laboureurs Left: Abraham Sacrificing Isaac and Christ Blessing; Right: Abraham Sacrificing Isaac	Labourers	1205–1215	Base Palissy: PM28000811, Ministère français de la Culture. (in French)	Media related to Bay 131 at Wikimedia Commons
133	Rose: Saint George; Gauche: Martyrdom of Saint George; Right: Mass of St Giles	Inhabitants of Nogent	1205–1215	Base Palissy: PM28000811, Ministère français de la Culture. (in French)	Media related to Bay 133 at Wikimedia Commons
135	Rose: Madonna and the Seven Gifts of the Holy Spirit; Left: an apostle Right: six apostles	Money-changers	1205–1215	Base Palissy: PM28000811, Ministère français de la Culture. (in French)	Media related to Bay 135 at Wikimedia Commons
137	Rose: Saint Thomas Becket; Gauche: saint Nicolas; Right: four apostles	Tellers; Two donors	1205–1215	Base Palissy: PM28000811, Ministère français de la Culture. (in French)	Media related to Bay 137 at Wikimedia Commons
139	Rose: Saint Lubin; Left: Saint Stephen; Right: Saint Lawrence	Weavers; Two donors	1205–1215	Base Palissy: PM28000811, Ministère français de la Culture. (in French)	Media related to Bay 139 at Wikimedia Commons
141	Rose: bishop saint Left: Jonah, Daniel, Habakkuk; Right: Temptations of Christ	Two donors	1205–1215	Base Palissy: IM28000520, Ministère français de la Culture. (in French)	Media related to Bay 141 at Wikimedia Commons

== Donors ==
It took several donations to build the new cathedral. Its construction involved all parts of medieval society – sovereigns (whose arms are seen in the north transept facade windows), nobles from the Chartres, Île-de-France and Normandy regions, the cathedral chapter and the trade guilds. The nobles are shown in 26 upper windows but only three lower ones and so were mainly involved in funding the former - those depicted include Louis VIII, Étienne de Sancerre, Guillaume de la Ferté, Simon de Montfort, Thibault VI, count of Blois and Chartres, Ferdinand III of Castille, Raoul de Courtenay, Robert de Champignelles, a lord of the Bar-Loupy family, Bouchard de Montmorency, Robert de Beaumont, Jean de Courville, Pierre de Dreux (known as Mauclerc), Jean Clément de Metz, lord of Mez and Argentan and Philippe Hurepel, count of Boulogne. Blanche of Castile and Louis IX funded the north façade of the transepts, whilst those on the south façade of the transepts were paid for by Pierre de Dreux. Nearly thirty confraternities and corporations also funded windows and are also shown, including those for carpenters, labourers, wine growers, masons, stone cutters, drapers, furriers and bakers.

=== Guild windows ===
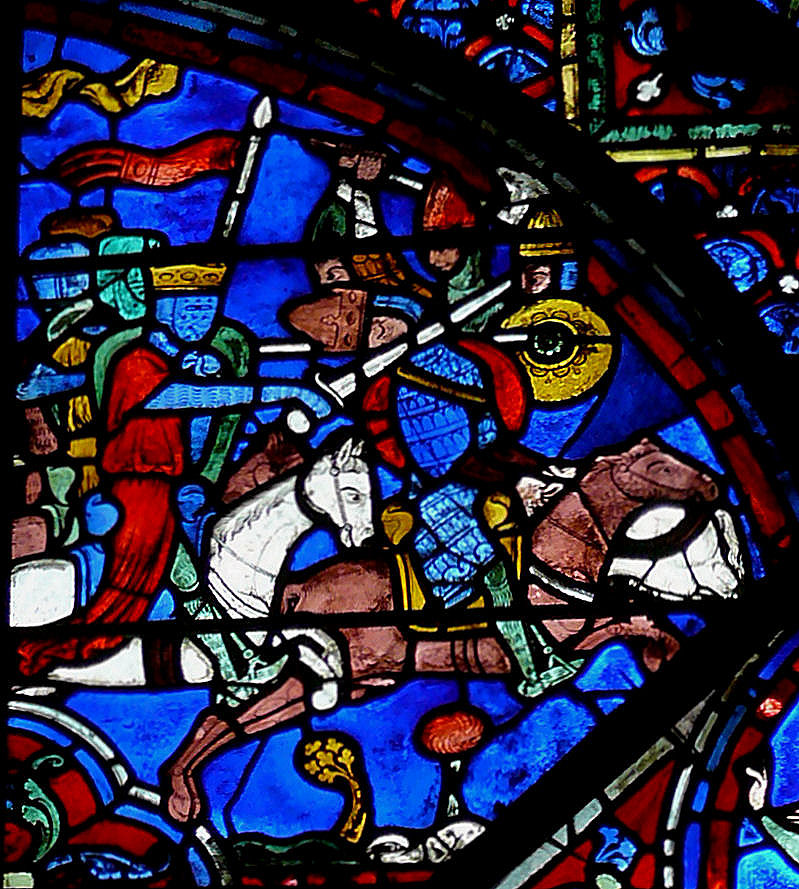
Knights fighting
(bay 7)

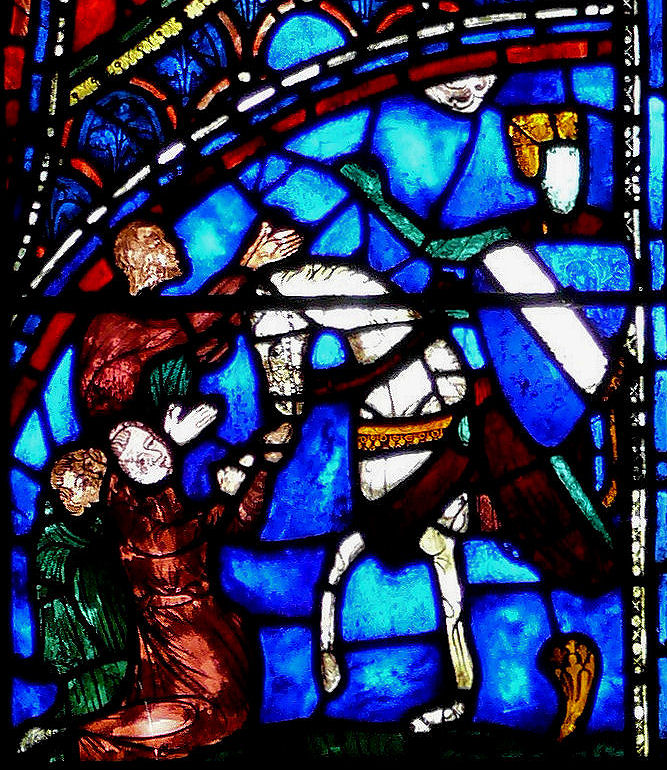
Knight with the Champagne family coat of arms, probably Thibaud VI - Life of the Virgin (bay 28b)

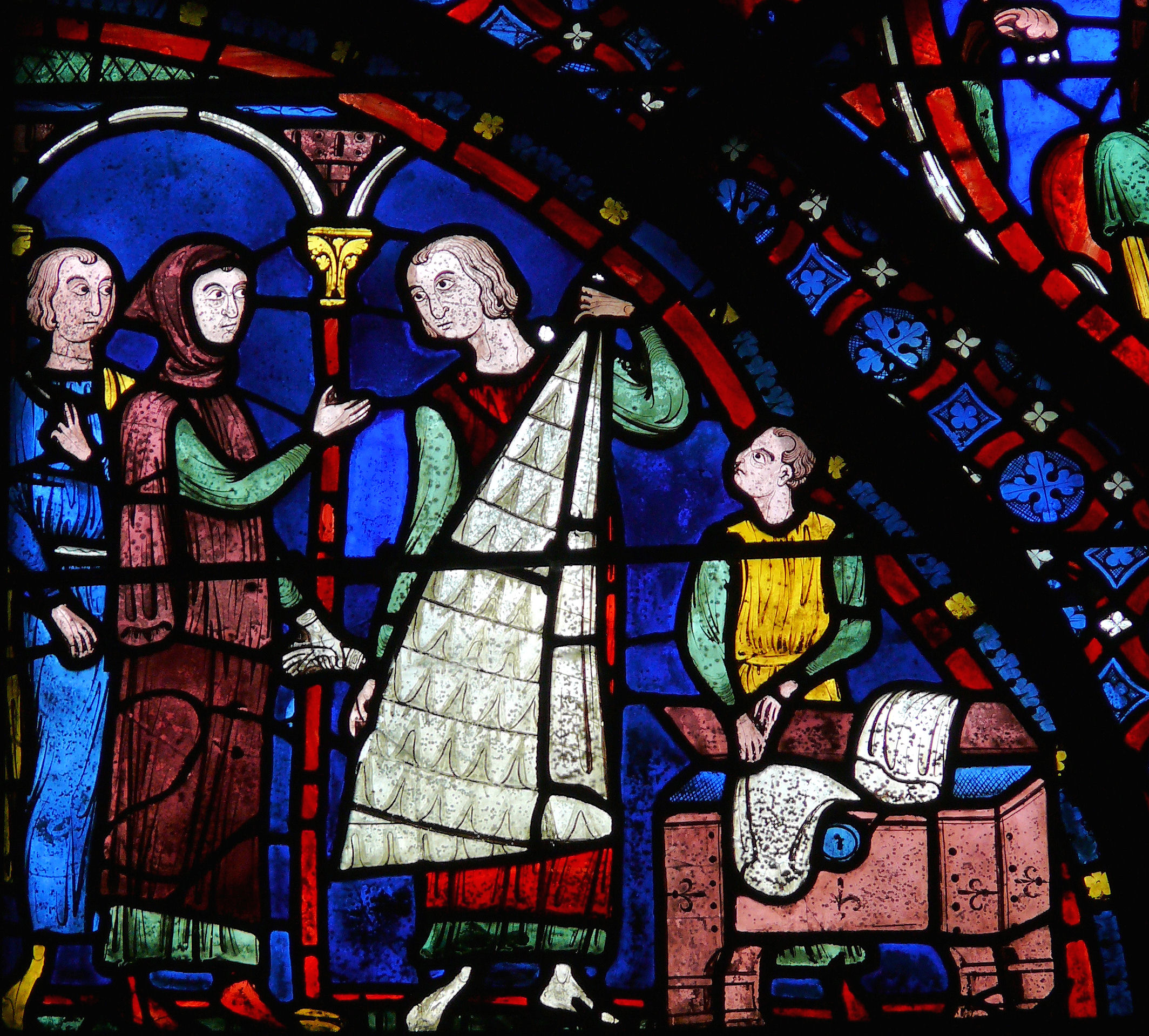
Life of Saint James the Great: furriers
(bay 5)

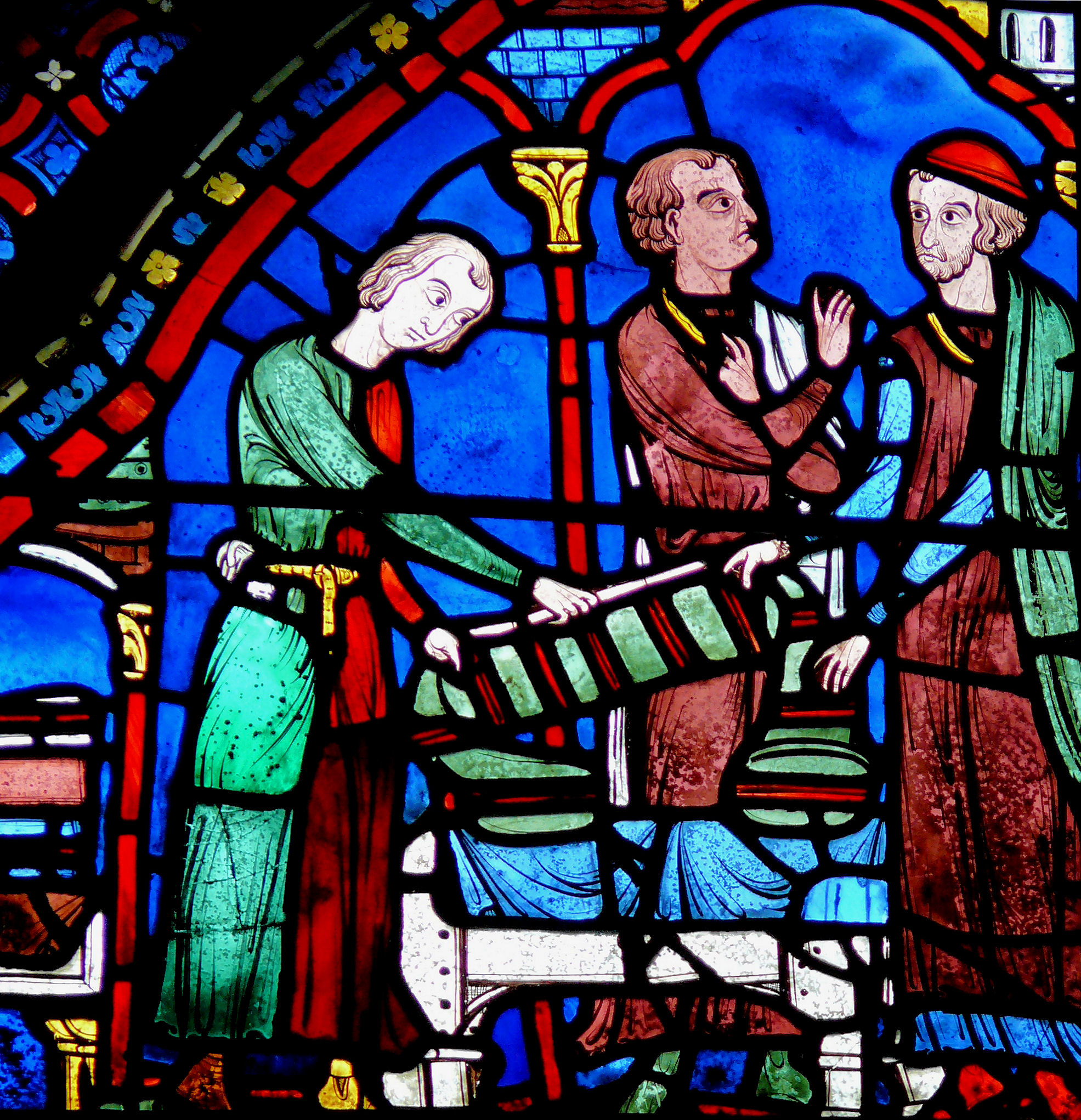
Life of Saint James the Great: drapers
(bay 5)

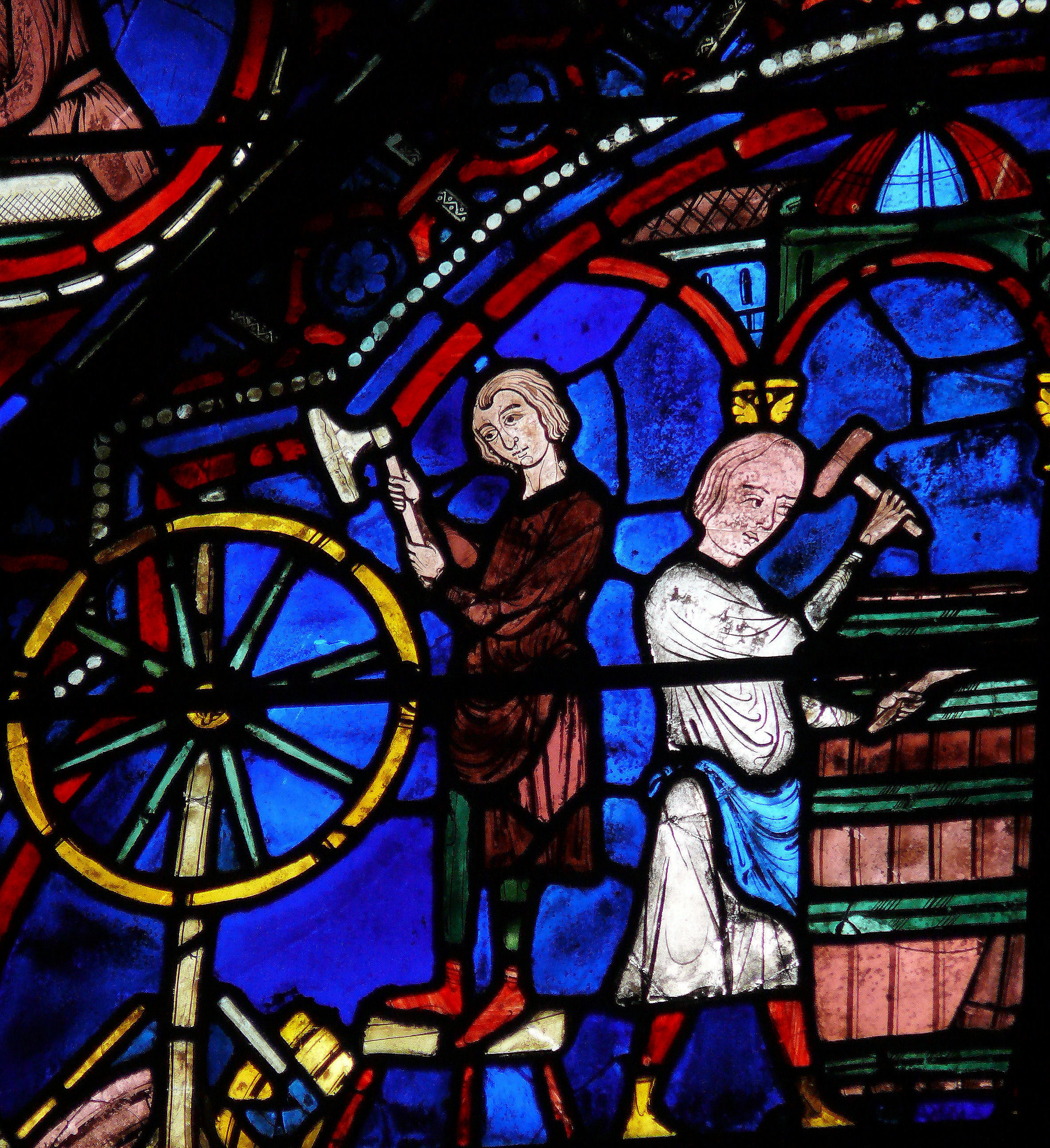
Charron et tonnelier
(bay 21)

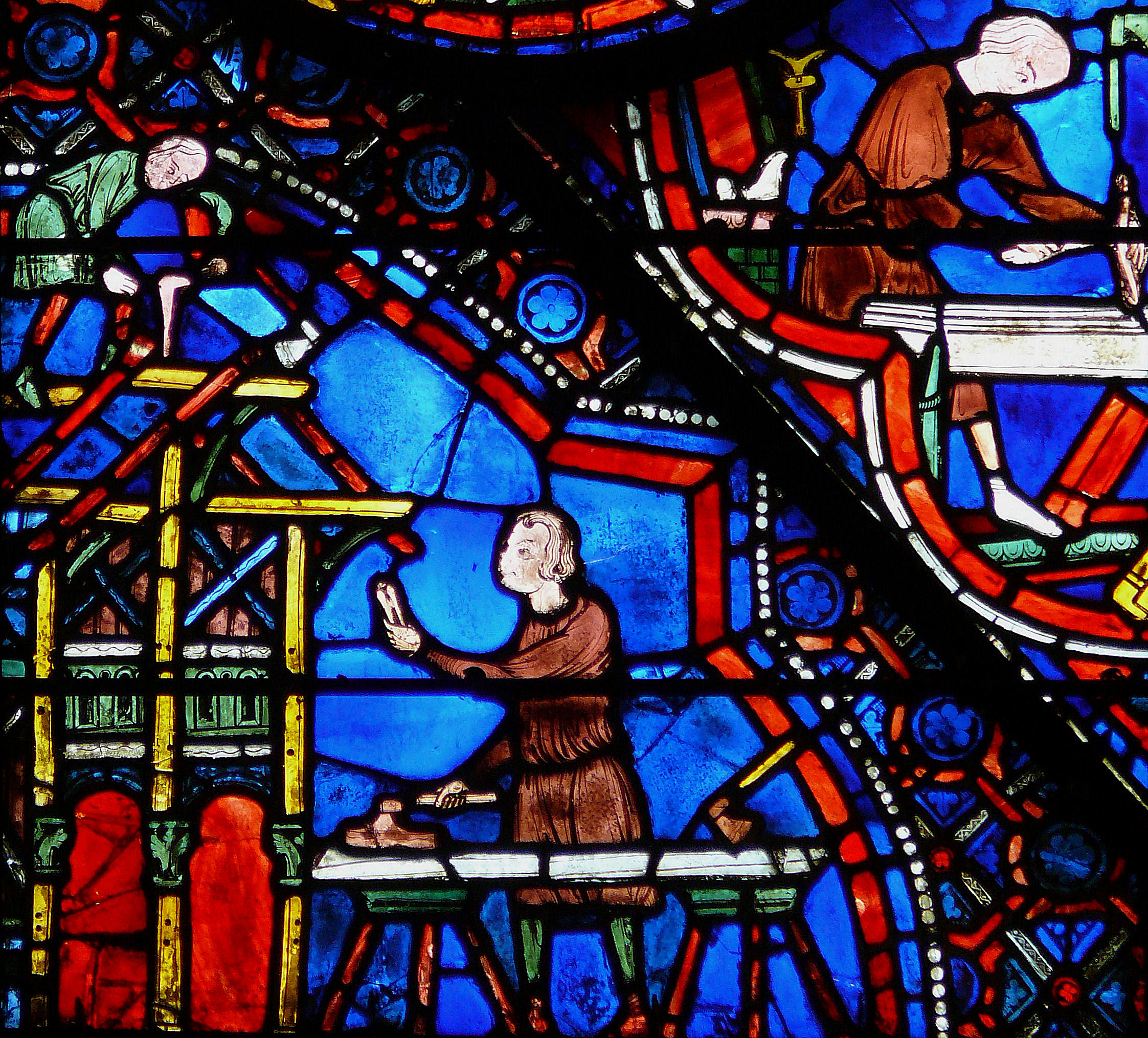
Carpenters
(bay 21)

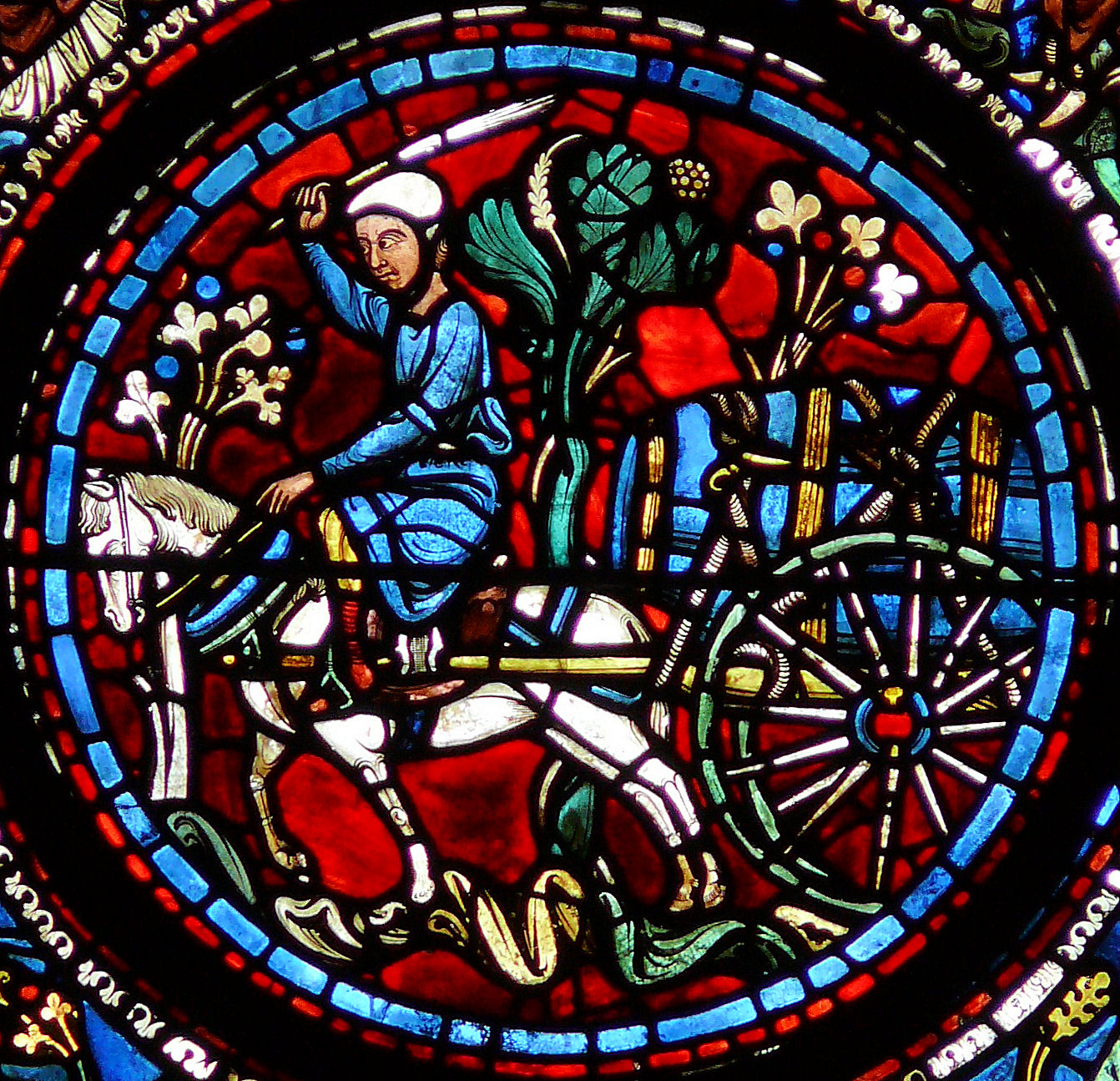
Transporting a barrel
(bay 45)
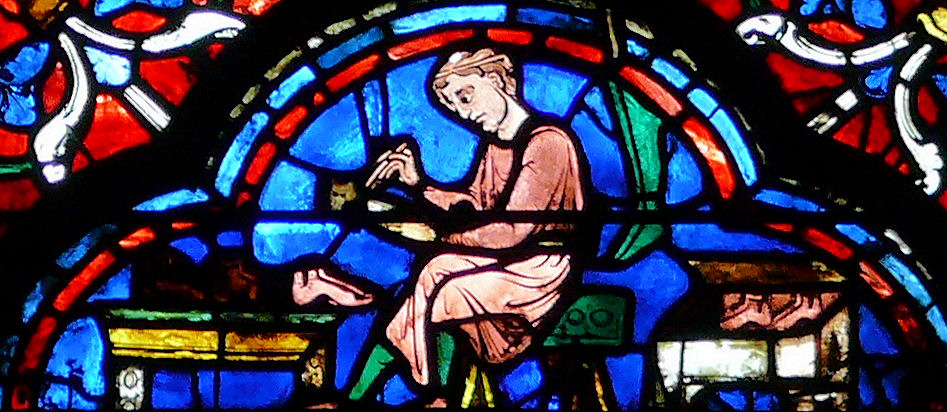
Shoemaker
(bay 42)

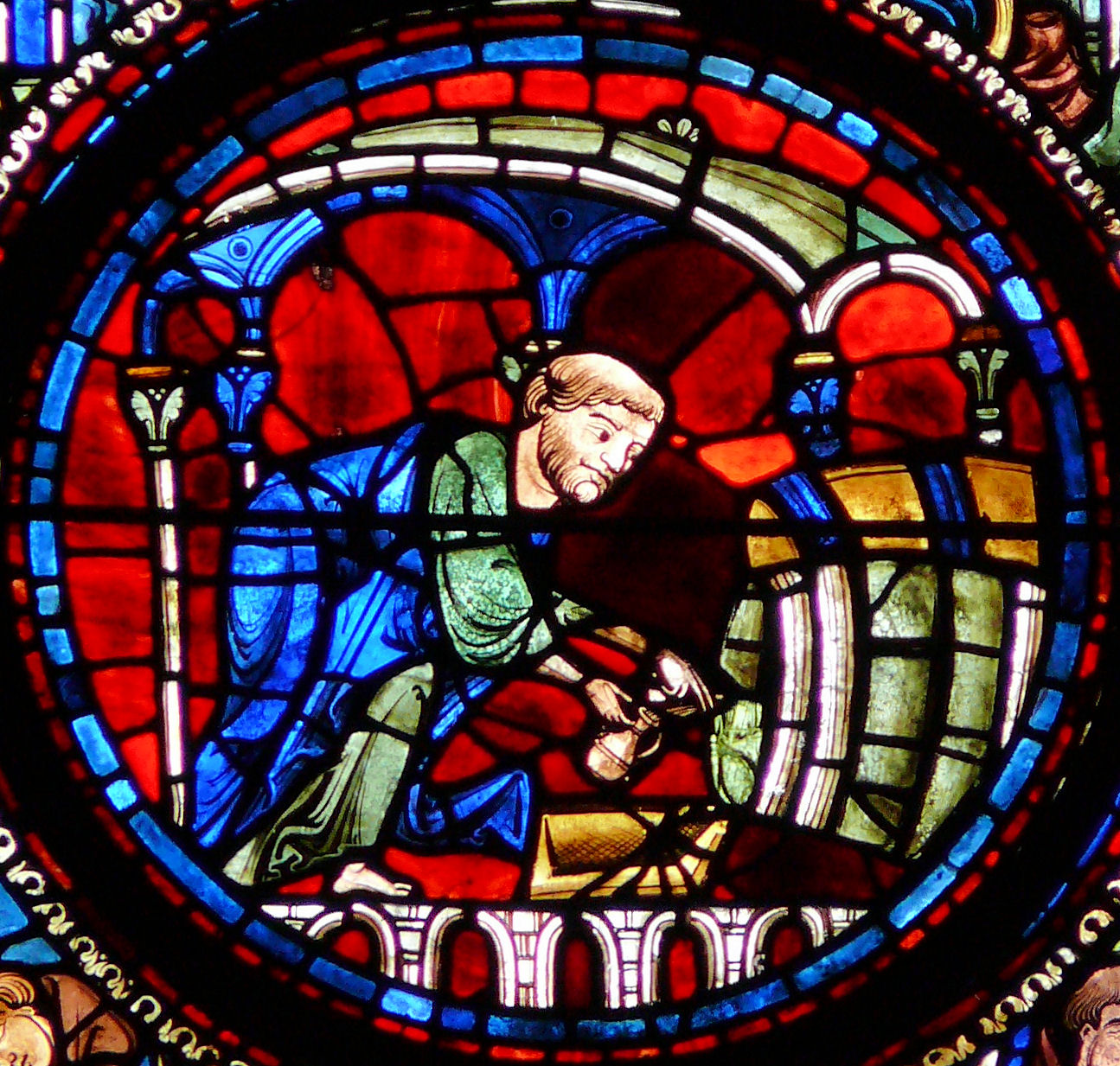
Drawing wine from a barrel - Life of Saint Lubin (bay 45)

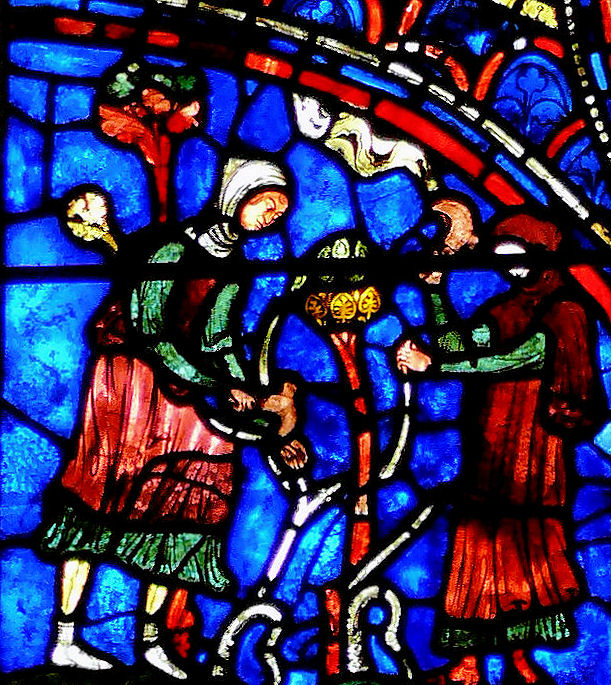
Two wine-growers pruning vines - Life of the Virgin (bay 28b)

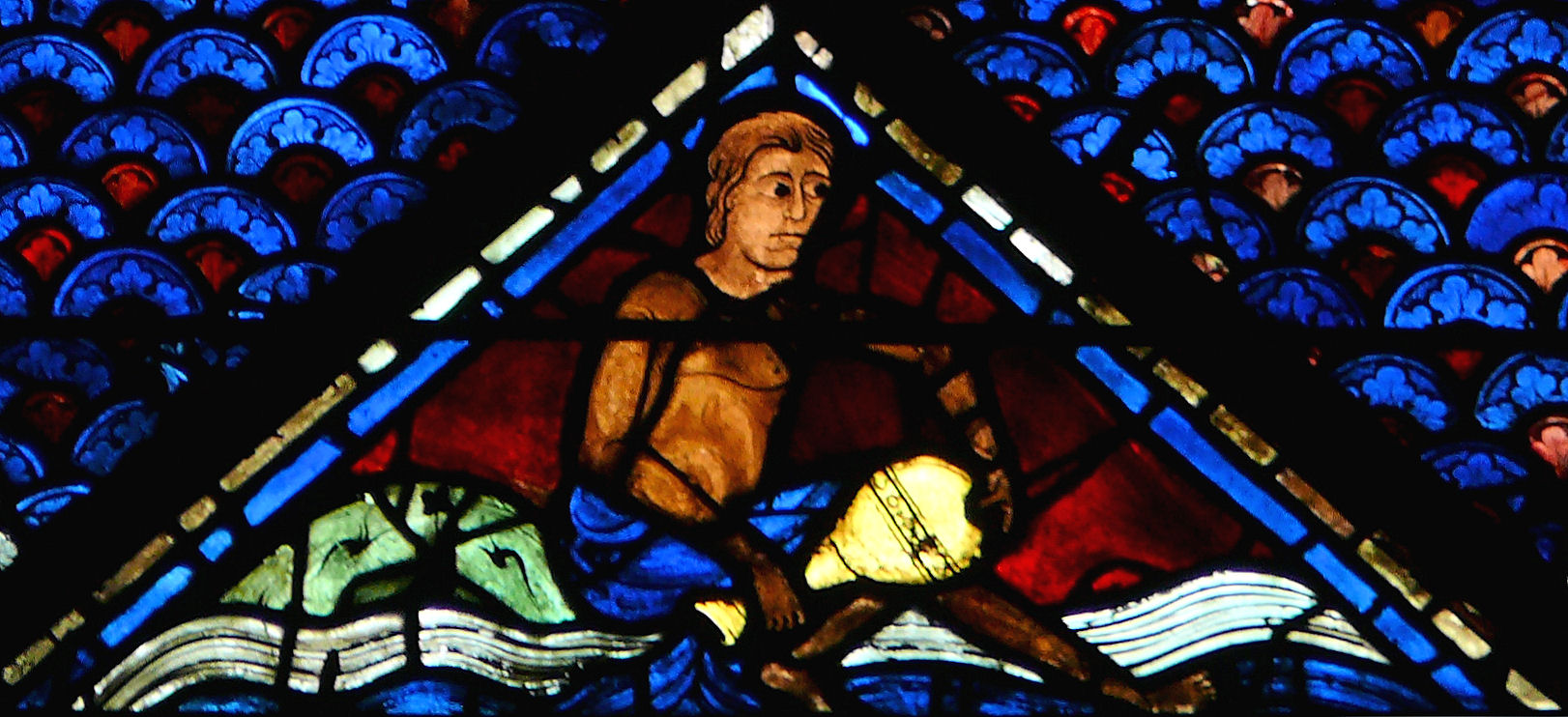
Water-bearer - Life of Saint Mary Magdalene
(bay 46)

Windows funded by trade guilds first appeared at Chartres and Bourges Cathedral between 1205 and 1215. Chartres' 172 windows include 125 representations of artisans engaged in 25 different jobs - making, transporting or selling their products in 42 windows.
