= Choir wall of Chartres Cathedral =

Architecture in Eure-et-Loir, France

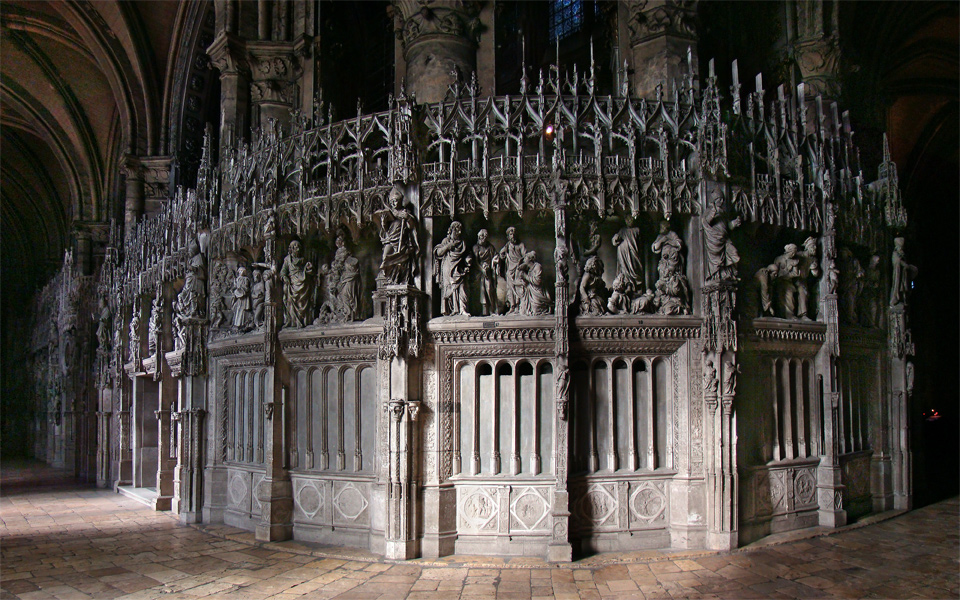
Overall view

The choir wall of Chartres Cathedral (French - clôture de chœur or tour du chœur) is a piece of stone architecture and sculpture in Chartres Cathedral, over 6 metres tall and around 100 metres long. It was commissioned right at the start of the 16th century by Jehan de Beauce to keep the laity out of the liturgical choir.

It marked a transition between Gothic art and the French Renaissance in what became known as the Louis XII style. Since 1862 the whole wall and each of its constituent parts have been listed as monuments historiques.

== Levels ==
It is divided into four horizontal levels - base, clerestory, niches and pinnacles.

=== Base ===
The lowest level consists of varied architectural decoration in Louis XII style, though the stylobates below classical-style medallions and the pointed squares draw on the Louis XI style.

=== Clerestory ===
Since six bas-reliefs by Charles-Antoine Bridan were placed inside the choir at the end of the 18th century, this level has been obscured by plaster. The upper part made up of niches and pinnacles is still wholly in the Flamboyant Gothic style, but the level uses the very un-medieval features of arabesque pilasters instead of ogives.

=== Niches ===
This consists of forty sculpted groups on the lives of the Virgin Mary and Jesus. Each group is numbered 1 to 40 below the niches. Some of the groups have a plaque mentioning the sculptor or a caption in Gothic script identifying the scene.

The forty groups are grouped into fifteen sections. The eight sections around the choir proper include a total of 29 scenes, including the double scene in the twelfth section (Raising of the Cross) - each section usually has four scenes, except the third section with the astronomical clock. The apse has eleven scenes - six of its sections consist of two scenes each, whilst scene 21 in the ninth section is a double-scene (Entry into Jerusalem). No scenes appear on the 'axial' or 'roundabout' section.

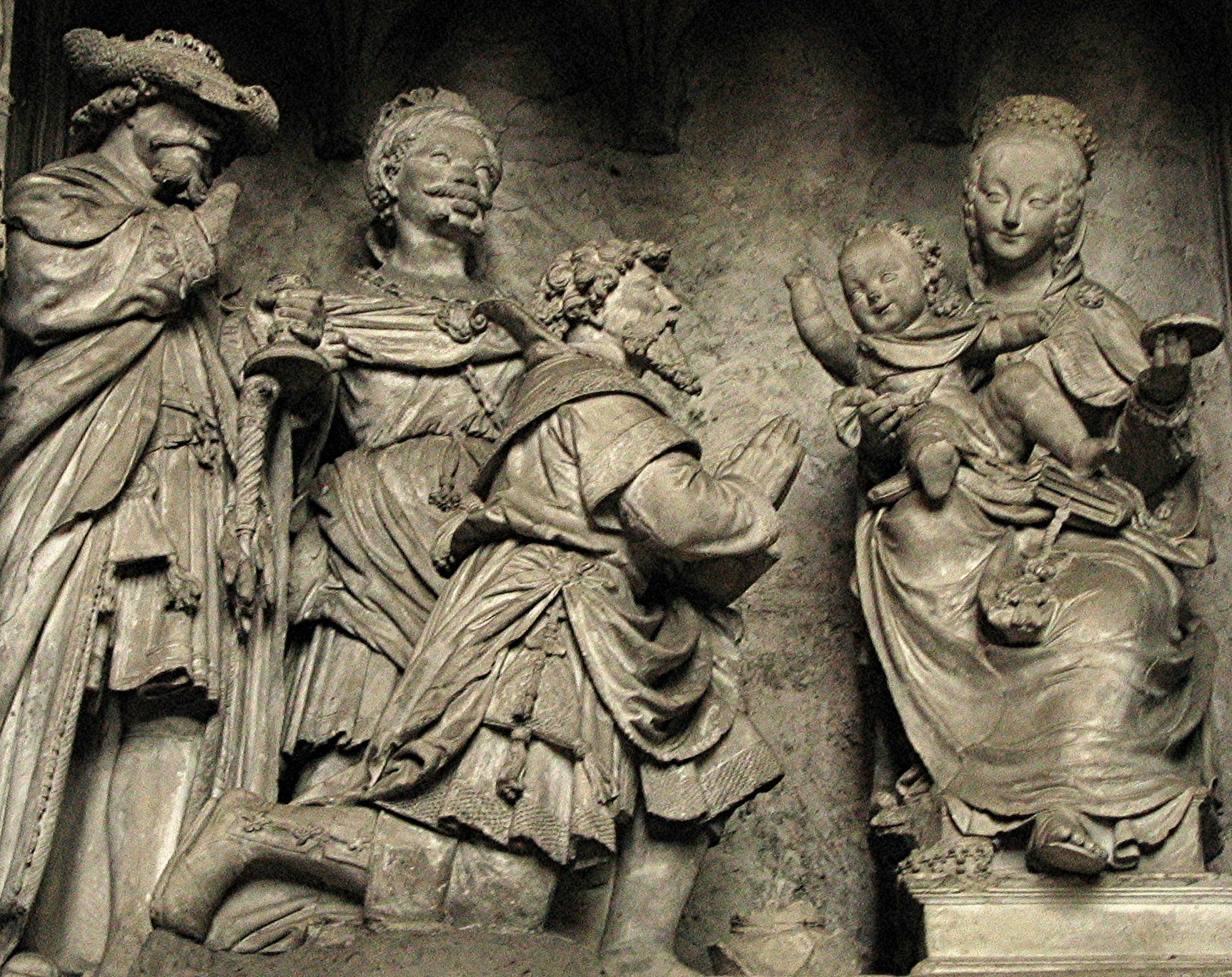
Adoration of the Magi (12).

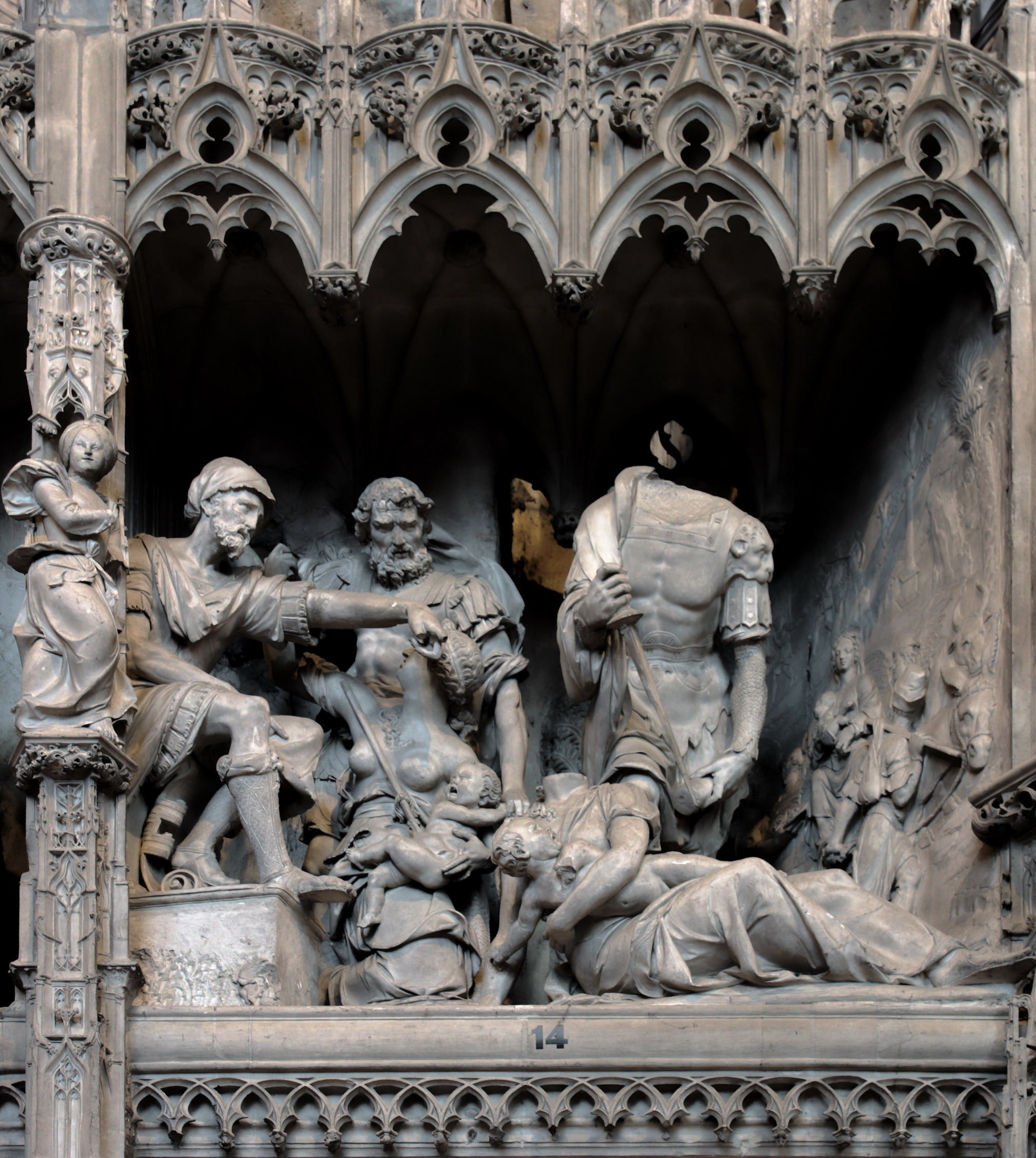
Massacre of the Innocents (14).

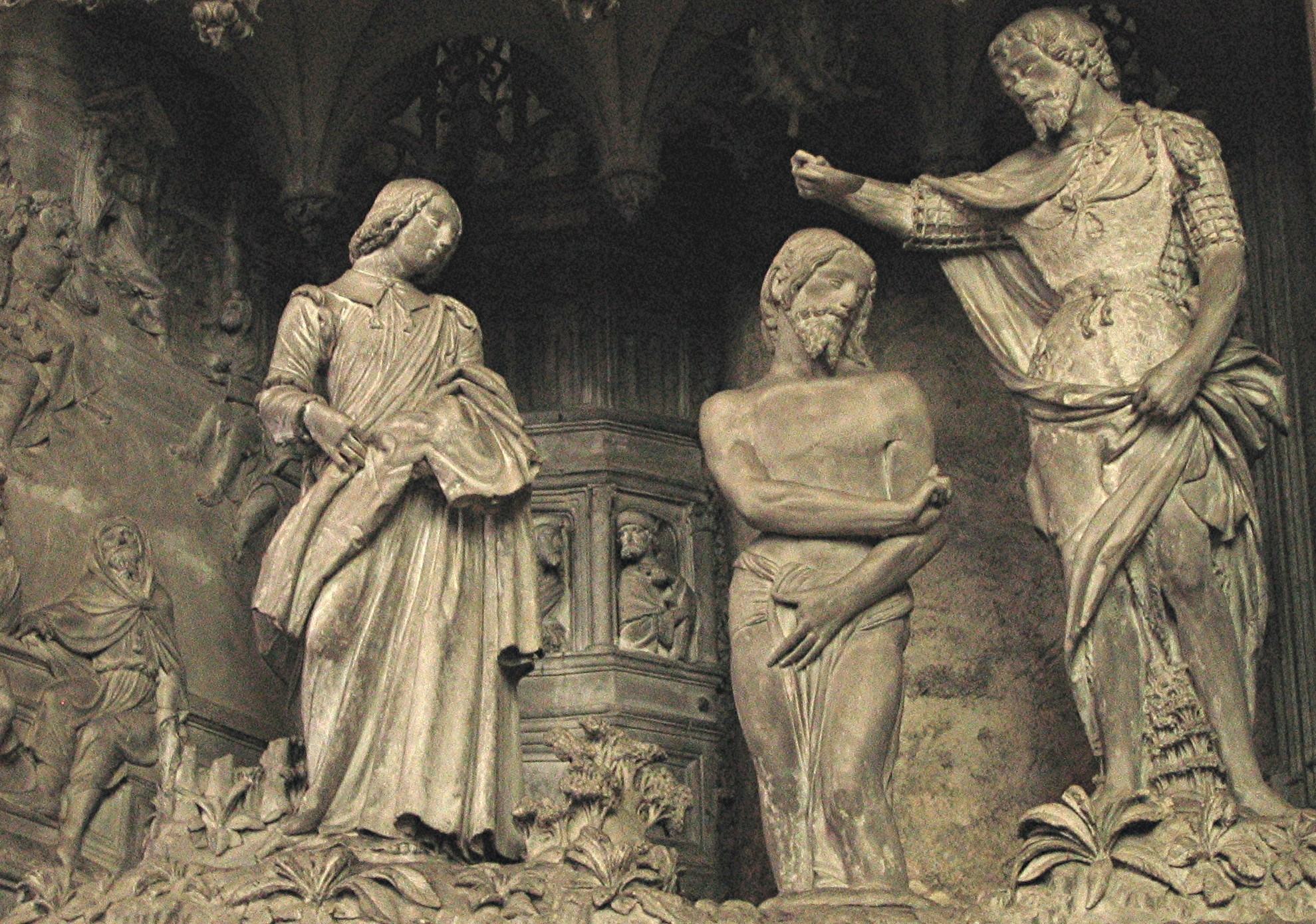
Baptism of Christ (15).

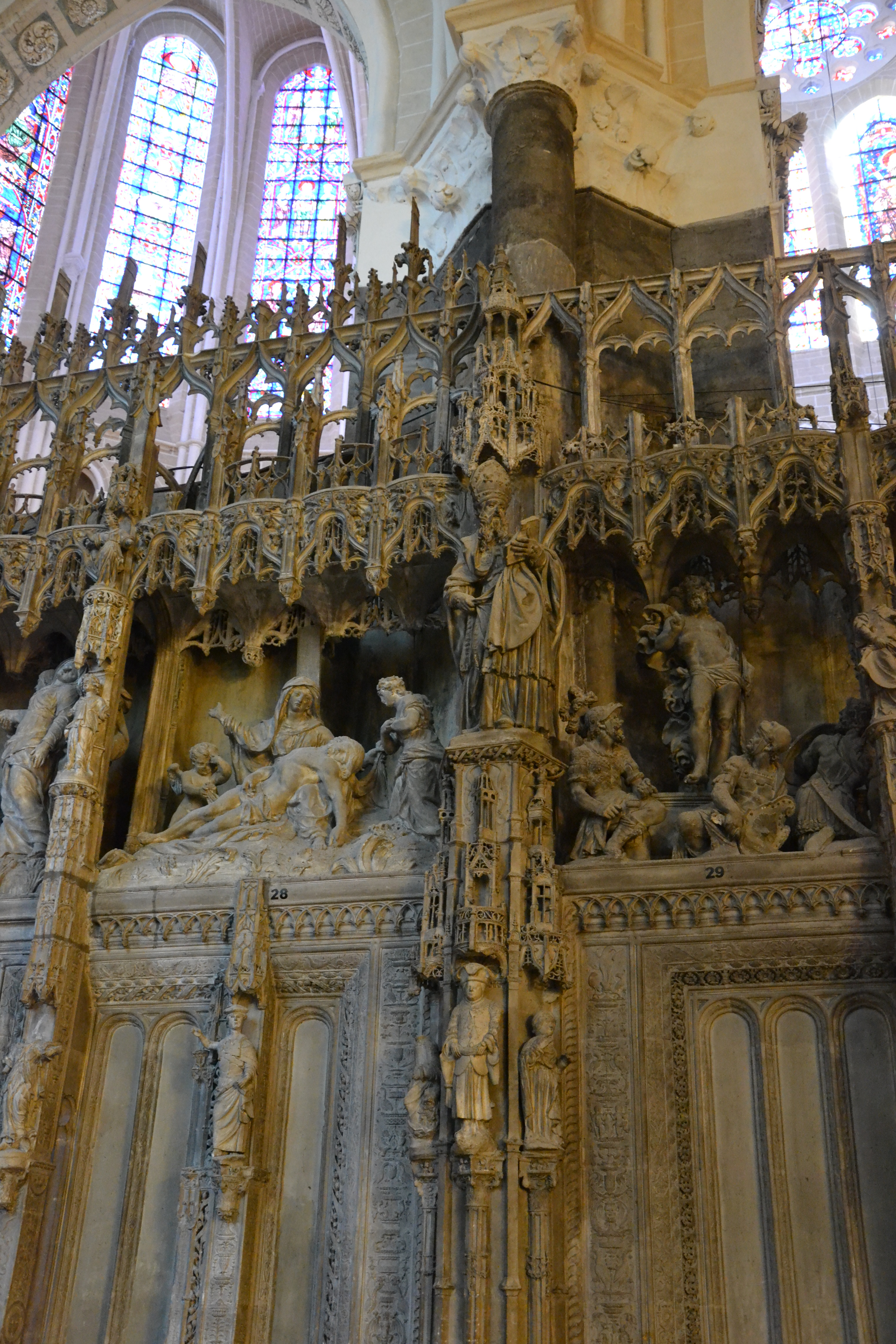
Lamentation (28), Resurrection (29).

==== List ====
Scene number	Section number	Subject	Dates	Sculptor	Base Palissy
1	1	Annunciation of the Birth of the Virgin Mary to Joachim	1519	Jehan Soulas	Base Palissy: IM28000414, Ministère français de la Culture. (in French)
2	1	Annunciation of the Birth of the Virgin Mary to Anne	1519	Jehan Soulas	Base Palissy: IM28000415, Ministère français de la Culture. (in French)
3	1	Anne and Joachim Meet at the Golden Gate	1519	Jehan Soulas	Base Palissy: IM28000416, Ministère français de la Culture. (in French)
4	1	Birth of the Virgin Mary	1519	Jehan Soulas	Base Palissy: IM28000417, Ministère français de la Culture. (in French)
5	2	The Virgin Mary Presented at the Temple	1521	Jehan Soulas	Base Palissy: IM28000418, Ministère français de la Culture. (in French)
6	2	Marriage of Joseph and the Virgin Mary	1521	Jehan Soulas	Base Palissy: IM28000419, Ministère français de la Culture. (in French)
7	2	Annunciation	1521	Jehan Soulas	Base Palissy: IM28000420, Ministère français de la Culture. (in French)
8	2	Visitation	1529	Jehan Soulas	Base Palissy: IM28000421, Ministère français de la Culture. (in French)
9	3	Joseph's Dream	1529	Jehan Soulas	Base Palissy: IM28000422, Ministère français de la Culture. (in French)
10	3	Nativity of Jesus	1529	Jehan Soulas	Base Palissy: IM28000423, Ministère français de la Culture. (in French)
11	4	Circumcision of Jesus	1529	Jehan Soulas	Base Palissy: IM28000424, Ministère français de la Culture. (in French)
12	4	Adoration of the Magi	1529	Jehan Soulas	Base Palissy: IM28000425, Ministère français de la Culture. (in French)
13	4	Christ Presented in the Temple	1543	François Marchand	Base Palissy: IM28000426, Ministère français de la Culture. (in French)
14	4	Massacre of the Innocents	1543	François Marchand	Base Palissy: IM28000427, Ministère français de la Culture. (in French)
15	5	Baptism of Jesus	1524-1548	Nicolas Guybert (?)	Base Palissy: IM28000428, Ministère français de la Culture. (in French)
16	5	Temptation of Christ	1611	Thomas Boudin	Base Palissy: IM28000429, Ministère français de la Culture. (in French)
17	6	Healing of the Canaanite Woman's Daughter	1611	Thomas Boudin	Base Palissy: IM28000430, Ministère français de la Culture. (in French)
18	6	Transfiguration	1611	Thomas Boudin	Base Palissy: IM28000431, Ministère français de la Culture. (in French)
19	7	The Woman Taken in Adultery	1680	Jean Dedieu	Base Palissy: IM28000432, Ministère français de la Culture. (in French)
20	7	Healing of the Man Born Blind	1683	Pierre Le Gros	Base Palissy: IM28000433, Ministère français de la Culture. (in French)
21	9	Christ Enters Jerusalem (2 scenes)	1705	Jean-Baptiste Tuby	Base Palissy: IM28000434, Ministère français de la Culture. (in French)
22	10	Agony in the Garden	1716	Simon Mazière	Base Palissy: IM28000435, Ministère français de la Culture. (in French)
23	10	Christ Arrested	1716	Simon Mazière	Base Palissy: IM28000436, Ministère français de la Culture. (in French)
24	11	Christ before Pontius Pilate	1716	Simon Mazière	Base Palissy: IM28000437, Ministère français de la Culture. (in French)
25	11	Flagellation of Christ	1713	Simon Mazière	Base Palissy: IM28000438, Ministère français de la Culture. (in French)
26	12	Christ Crowned with Thorns	1715	Simon Mazière	Base Palissy: IM28000439, Ministère français de la Culture. (in French)
27	12	Raising of the Cross (1 double scene)	1714	Simon Mazière	Base Palissy: IM28000440, Ministère français de la Culture. (in French)
28	12	Lamentation of Christ - Piéta	1714	Simon Mazière	Base Palissy: IM28000441, Ministère français de la Culture. (in French)
29	13	Resurrection	1610-1611	Thomas Boudin	Base Palissy: IM28000442, Ministère français de la Culture. (in French)
30	13	The Marys at the Tomb	1610-1611	Thomas Boudin	Base Palissy: IM28000443, Ministère français de la Culture. (in French)
31	13	The Road to Emmaus	1610-1611	Thomas Boudin	Base Palissy: IM28000444, Ministère français de la Culture. (in French)
32	13	Christ Appears to Thomas	1610-1611	Thomas Boudin	Base Palissy: IM28000445, Ministère français de la Culture. (in French)
33	14	Christ Appears to Mary Magdalene	1516-1517	Unknown	Base Palissy: IM28000446, Ministère français de la Culture. (in French)
34	14	Ascension	1516-1517	Unknown	Base Palissy: IM28000447, Ministère français de la Culture. (in French)
35	14	Pentecost	1516-1517	Unknown	Base Palissy: IM28000448, Ministère français de la Culture. (in French)
36	14	Adoration of the Cross	1516-1517	Unknown	Base Palissy: IM28000449, Ministère français de la Culture. (in French)
37	15	Dormition of the Virgin Mary	1516-1517	Unknown	Base Palissy: IM28000450, Ministère français de la Culture. (in French)
38	15	Burial of the Virgin Mary	1516-1517	Unknown	Base Palissy: IM28000451, Ministère français de la Culture. (in French)
39	15	Assumption	1516-1517	Unknown	Base Palissy: IM28000452, Ministère français de la Culture. (in French)
40	15	Coronation of the Virgin Mary	1516-1517	Unknown	Base Palissy: IM28000453, Ministère français de la Culture. (in French)

==== Astronomical clock ====
A 1528 astronomical clock by an unknown clockmaker is located on the south side after the Visitation scene, at the start of the third section, which thus only has two scenes (Joseph's Dream and Nativity). The original mechanism was replaced by an electrical system in 2009.

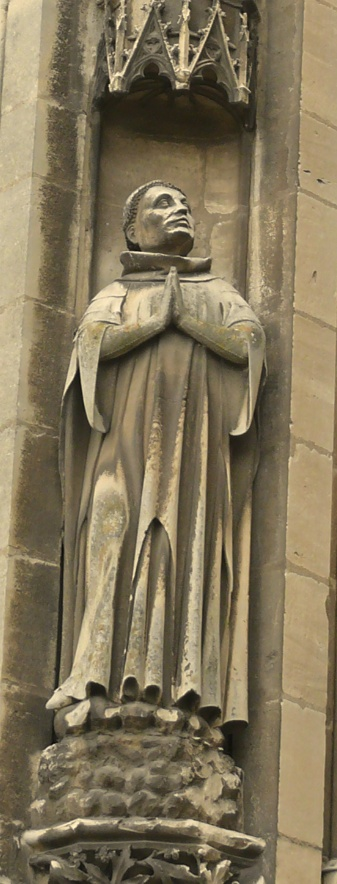
Statuette on a dais.

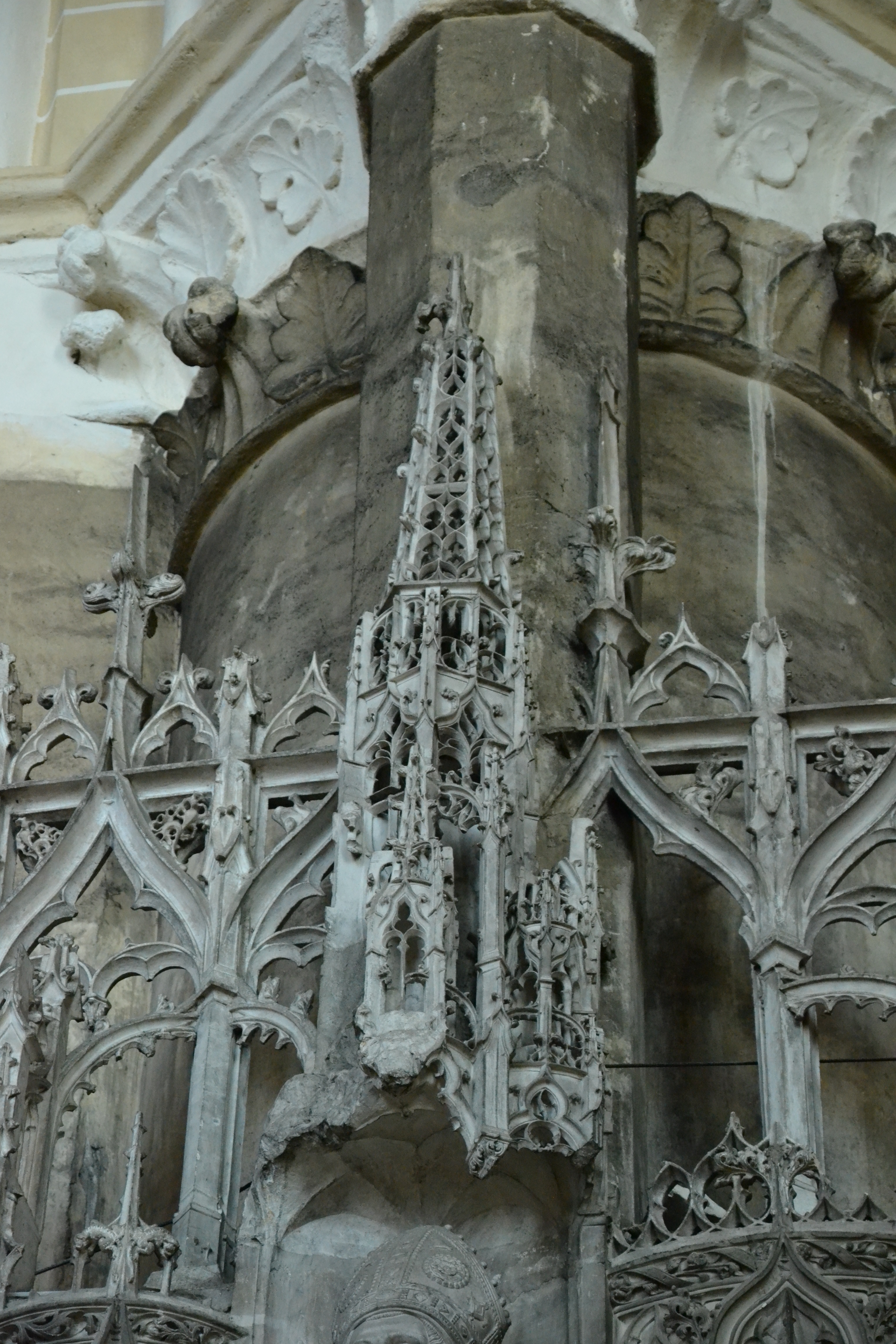
Crown (detail)

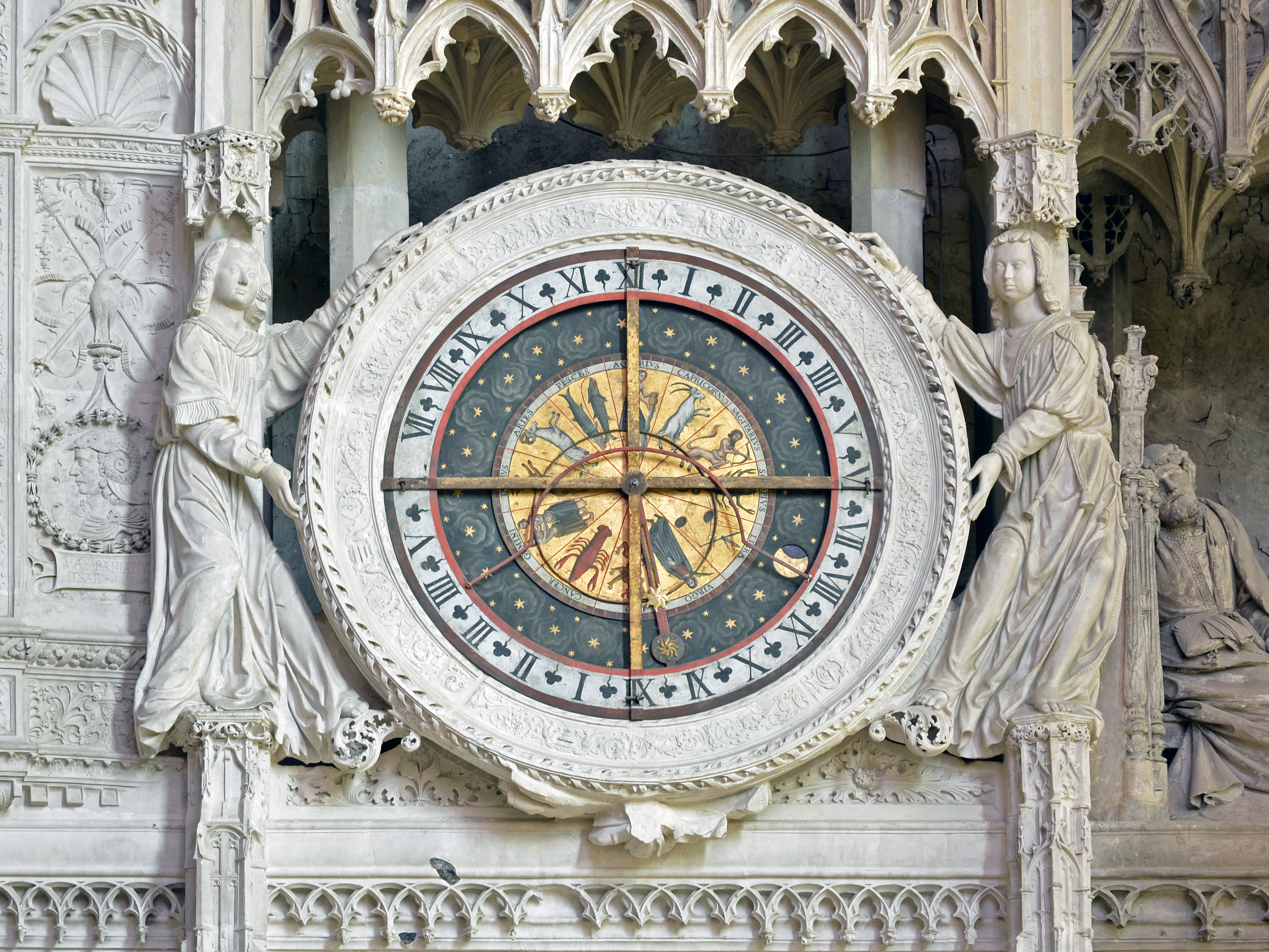
Clockface

==== Statuary ====
The columns between the spans hold statues, around 1.6m tall, all by Thomas Boudin, showing God the Father, Fulbert and other unidentified bishops of Chartres. There are also another 84 smaller statues at various levels, between 35 cm and 60 cm tall - the original plan seemed to be to show figures from society and envisaged 136 of these smaller statues.

=== Pinnacles ===
This is made up of several architectural features such as stone baldachins, appearing like stone lace. It was built section by section with the corresponding groups and thus took more than 200 years to complete.
