= Tuby =

Tuby is a surname. Notable people with the surname include:

- Jean-Baptiste Tuby (1635–1700), French sculptor
- Jean-Baptiste Tuby II (1665–1735), French sculptor
