= Jehan Soulas =

French sculptor

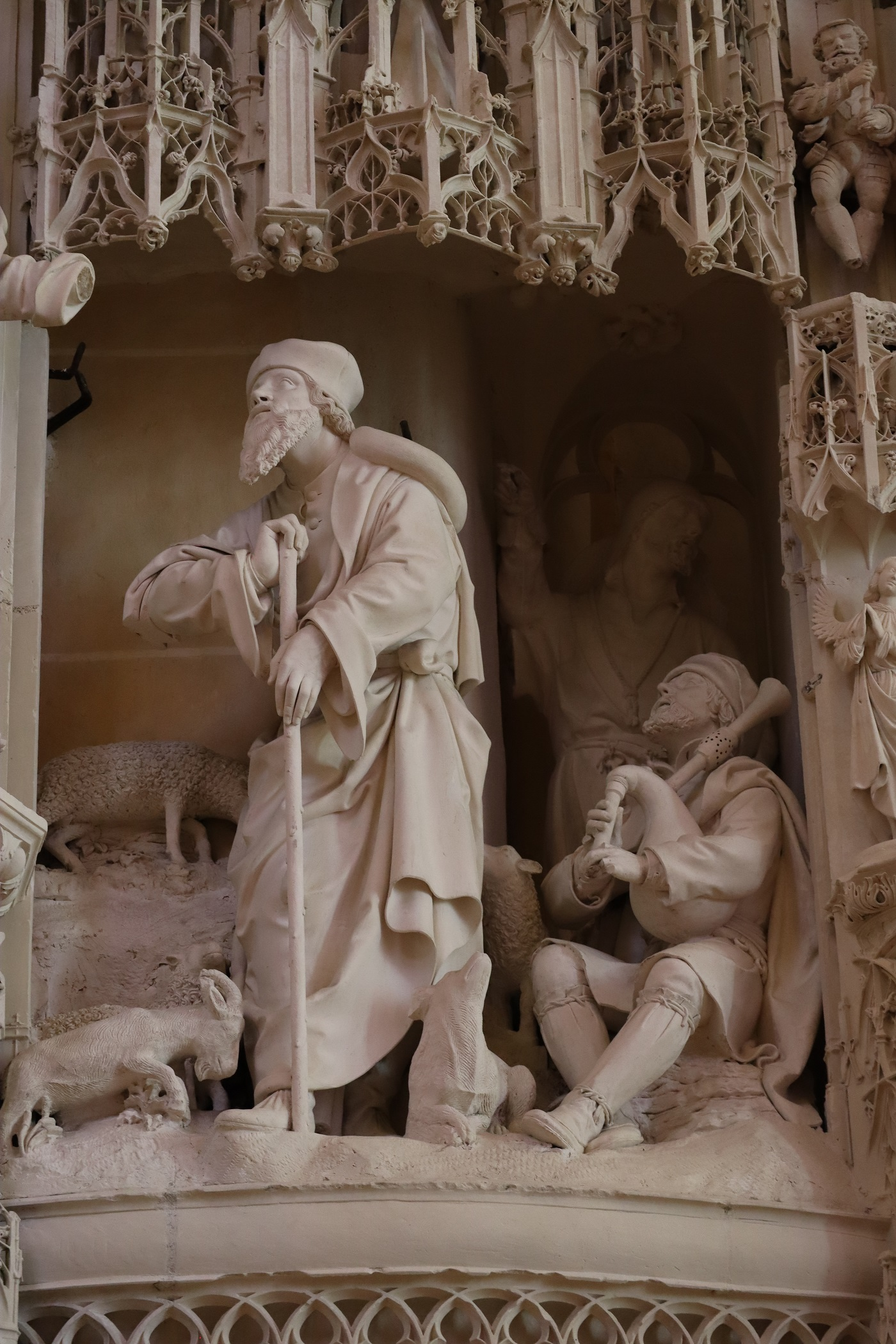
Jehan Soulas, Annonce de la naissance de la Vierge à Joachim, c. 1520, Chartres Cathedral.

Jehan Soulas (died before 1542) was an early 16th century French sculptor, working in both the Gothic and Renaissance styles. He made several sculpted groups for the choir wall of Chartres Cathedral.

== External links (in French) ==
- Académie d'Orléans - Fiche enseignant : Tour du chœur de la cathédrale de Chartres - L'Annonciation (Jehan Soulas)
- Archives départementales d'Eure-et-Loir : Contrat avec le sculpteur Jehan Soulas pour l'ornementation du chœur
