= François Marchand =

French sculptor

François Marchand (c.1500 - August 1551) was a French sculptor. He was born in Orléans and died in Paris. He made several sculpted groups for the choir wall of Chartres Cathedral and the tomb of King Francis I in the Basilica of Saint-Denis.
