= Thomas Boudin =

French sculptor (1570-1637)

Thomas Boudin (1570 - 24 March 1637) was a French sculptor. He was born and died in Paris.

== Life ==
Born into a family of artists active in Paris and its environs, he lived in the parish of Saint Eustache on rue Montorgueil. His father Guillaume Boudin (1567-1614) and his son Barthélémy Boudin were both also sculptors, with the latter named after his godfather Barthélemy Tremblay, a sculptor to the king. His eldest son Guillaume was baptised in 1604, with one of the godfathers being Guillaume Périer, another sculptor to the king.

He was apprenticed to Mathieu Jacquet in 1584 and remained in his studio until 1595. He was made official sculptor to the king in 1606 and in 1607-1608 he had two daughters. He was one of the signatories of the statutes of the community of master painters and sculptors as revised on 16 January 1619.

== Bibliography ==
- (in French) « Marché passé par Thomas Boudin, sculpteur du roi, pour l'exécution de l'autel des Corps Saints dans l'abbaye de Saint-Denis, 29 août 1626 », in Nouvelles archives de l'art français, 1897, 3e série, tome XIII, p. 61-74 (read online)
