= Base Palissy =

Database of French movable heritage

The Base Palissy is the database of French movable heritage, created and maintained by the French Ministry of Culture. It was created in 1989, and placed online in 2002. The database is periodically updated, and contains more than 515,000 entries as of October 2020. It covers several types of objects: stained glass, paintings, sculptures, religious and civil objects, scientific collections and industrial heritage. Many, but not all of the described objects are also listed as historical monuments. The database was named after 16th century potter and writer Bernard Palissy. In 2005, the Palissy database contained some 280,000 records, including 170,000 for the Inventory and 110,000 for historic monuments. 25,000 entries are illustrated by the Mémoire database. 5,000 complete documentary files are associated with the records.

== See also ==
- Base Mérimée, database of French monumental and architectural heritage
- List of heritage registers globally
- Monument historique, the official classification for French historic monuments
