= Simon Mazière =

French sculptor

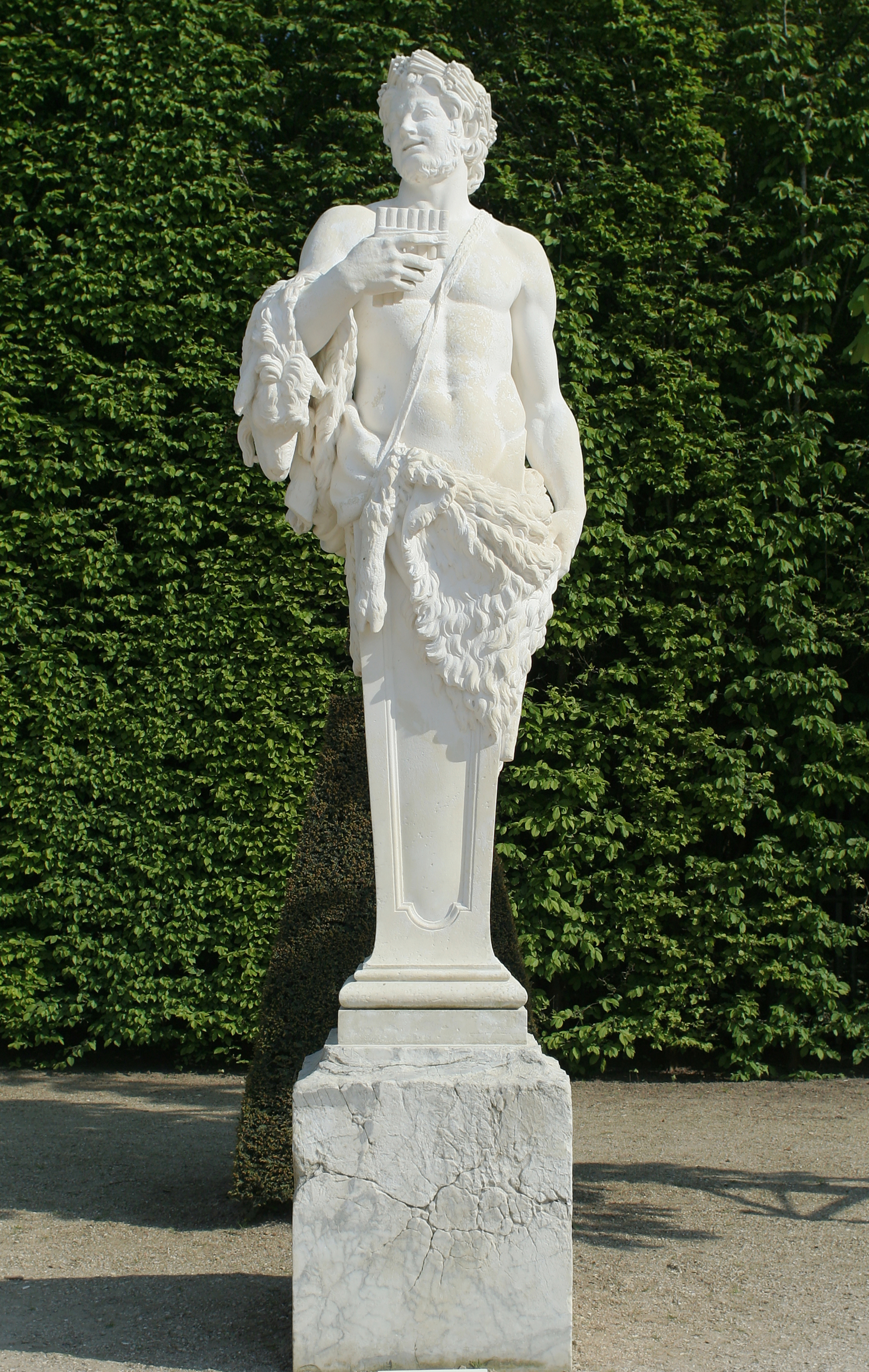
Parc de Versailles, demi-lune du bassin d'Apollon, Pan, Simon Mazière 01

Simon Mazière (1649 - 1722) was a French sculptor who was born in Pontoise. Some of his sculptures can be found in the Gardens of Versaille. The Gardens of Versaille were created for the Palace of Versailles which in is Versaille, about 19 km west of Paris. The Palace of Versaille was commissioned by King Louis XIV. The Palace and grounds are a designated UNESCO World Heritage Site.

Mazière first sculpted Pan, which he based on a wax figurine made by François Girardon in 1685. The marble sculpture measures H. 295; L. 100; P. 90 cm, and is inscribed S. MAIIERE F. 1689.

Syrinx was commissioned as a companion piece to Pan based on the idea of Mr.^{.} Mansart. Also made of marble, Syrinx measures H. 294; L. 107; P. 74 cm and is also inscribed S. MAIIERE F. 1689.

In Greek mythology, the rustic god Pan pursued the naiad/nymph Syrinx, who tried to escape his unwanted advances.
