= Jean-Baptiste Tuby II =

French sculptor

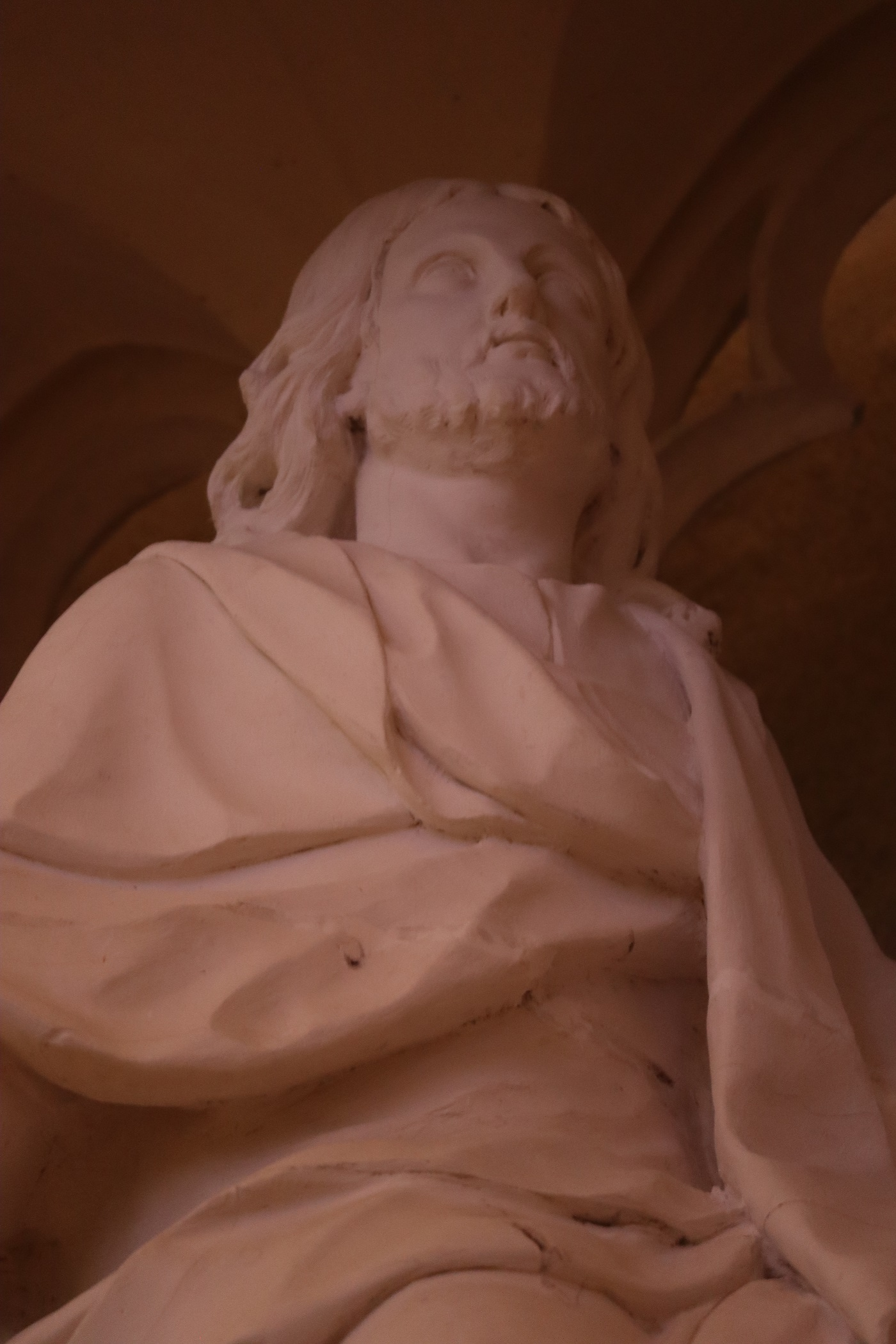
Detail from the choir screen of Chartres Cathedral, depicting the entry of Jesus into Jerusalem, by Jean-Baptise Tuby II.

Jean-Baptiste Tuby II (1665 - 6 October 1735) was a French sculptor, son of Jean-Baptiste Tuby. He sculpted Christ entering Jerusalem for Orleans Cathedral in 1703.
