= Jean-Baptiste Tuby =

French sculptor

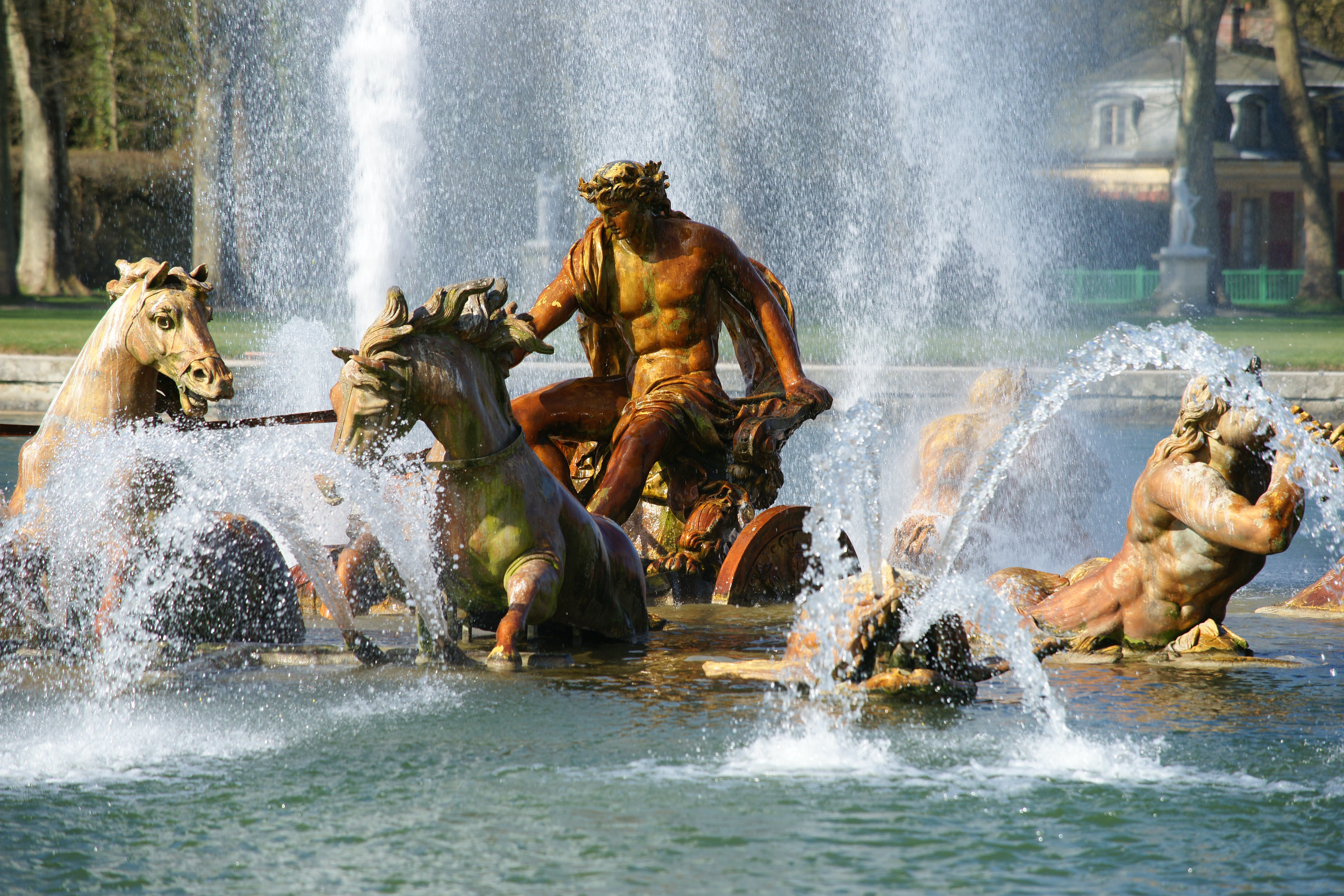
- Fountain of Apollo, Versailles
- Born: 1635; Rome
- Died: 9 August, 1700; Paris
- Known for: Sculpture
- Movement: Baroque and Style Louis XIV

Jean-Baptiste Tuby (also known as Le Romain - born in Rome in 1635, died in Paris 9 August 1700) was a French sculptor of Italian origins, best known for the sculpture in the fountains of the Gardens of Versailles. His work expresses the exuberance of the Baroque blended with the classicism of the Louis XIV style.

== Life ==
Tuby was born Giambattista Tubi in Rome in 1635, and first trained as a sculptor in Italy, before coming to France sometime after 1660. He was first engaged by the Gobelins Manufactory, headed by Charles Le Brun, the chief artist for the King. In 1664–65, he was employed making sculptures for the grottoes and terraces of the Chateau of Saint-Germain-en-Laye. This led to major projects for the fountains and gardens of the Palace of Versailles, including the gilded lead sculpture of Apollo and his chariot for the Basin of Apollo (1668-71), the statues of the Rivers Saône and Rhone for the central basin (1683) and the statue of Flore. He also made a monumental statue of Peace and a large carved marble vase for the courtyard, and several other statues on mythological themes for the bouquets, or enclosed gardens, in the park.

Le Rhône, La Saône, bronzes (1685-1688) Le vase de la paix, marbre (1685-1686). In addition to his work at Versailles, he collaborated on several projects with sculptor Antoine Coysevox, making a Pieta for the sepulcher of Jean-Baptiste Colbert, now in the Church of Saint-Eustache in Paris, and a bronze statue of Peace at the foot of the funeral monument to Cardinal Mazarin, in the Collège des Quatre-Nations (now the Institut de France). He also worked on the group of figures around the funeral monument to Marshal Turenne, originally in the Basilica of Saint-Denis, now at near the tomb of Napoleon at Les Invalides.

He was naturalized as a French citizen in 1672, and married the niece of Le Brun. Under Le Bruns's sponsorship he entered the new Royal Academy of Painting and Sculpture in 1676.

== Sculpture ==
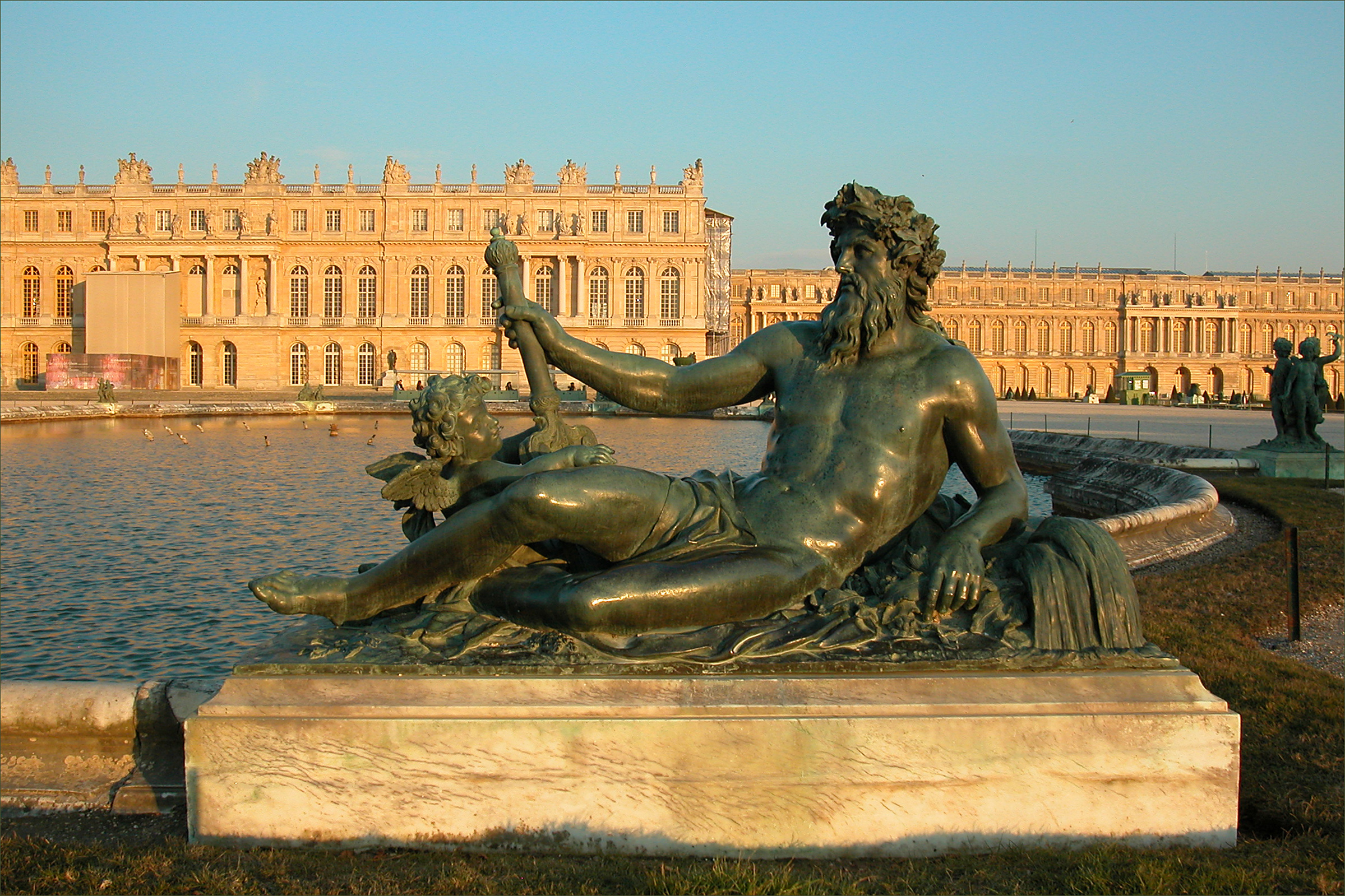
The Rhone (1685-1688)

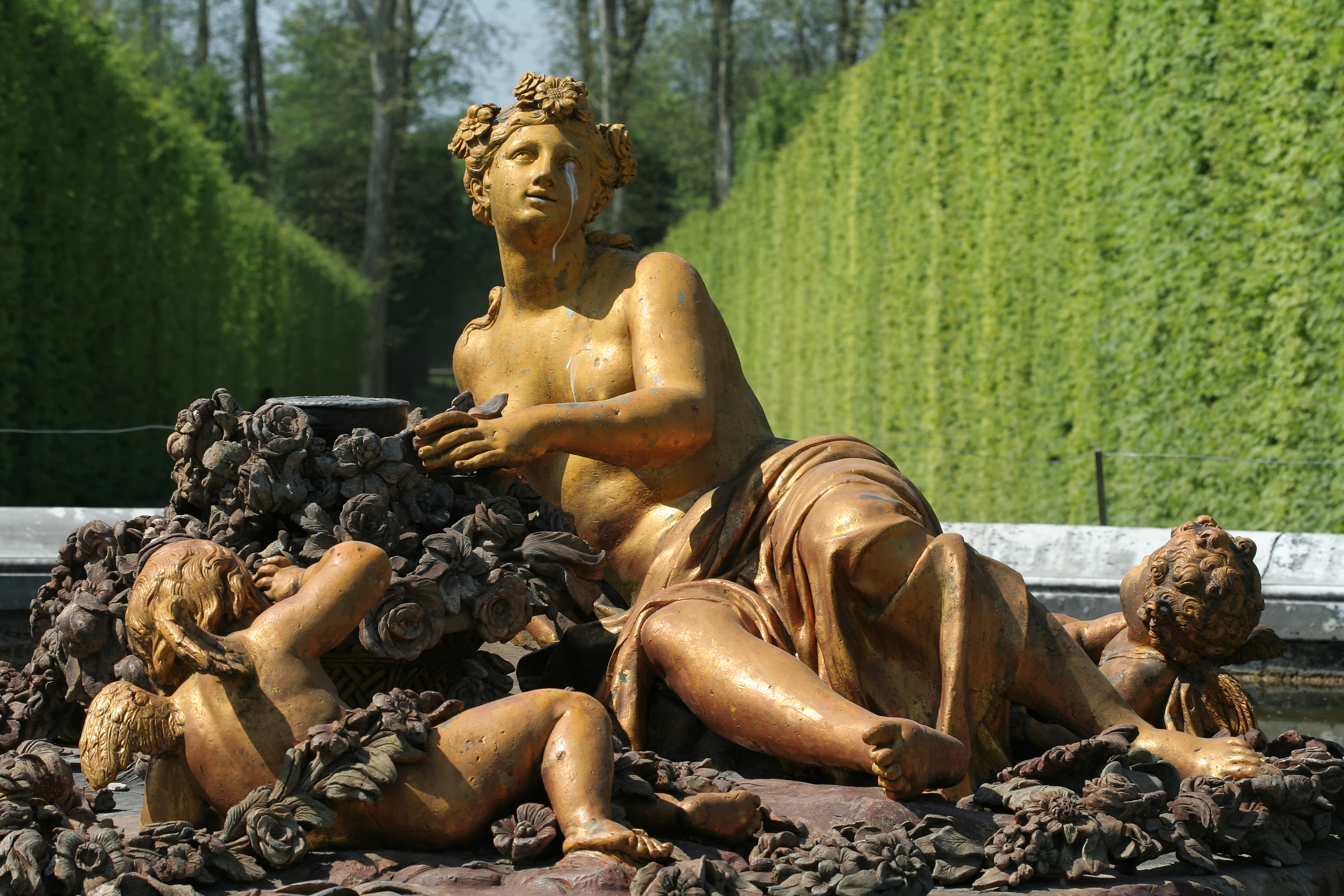
Bassin de Flore (1672-79

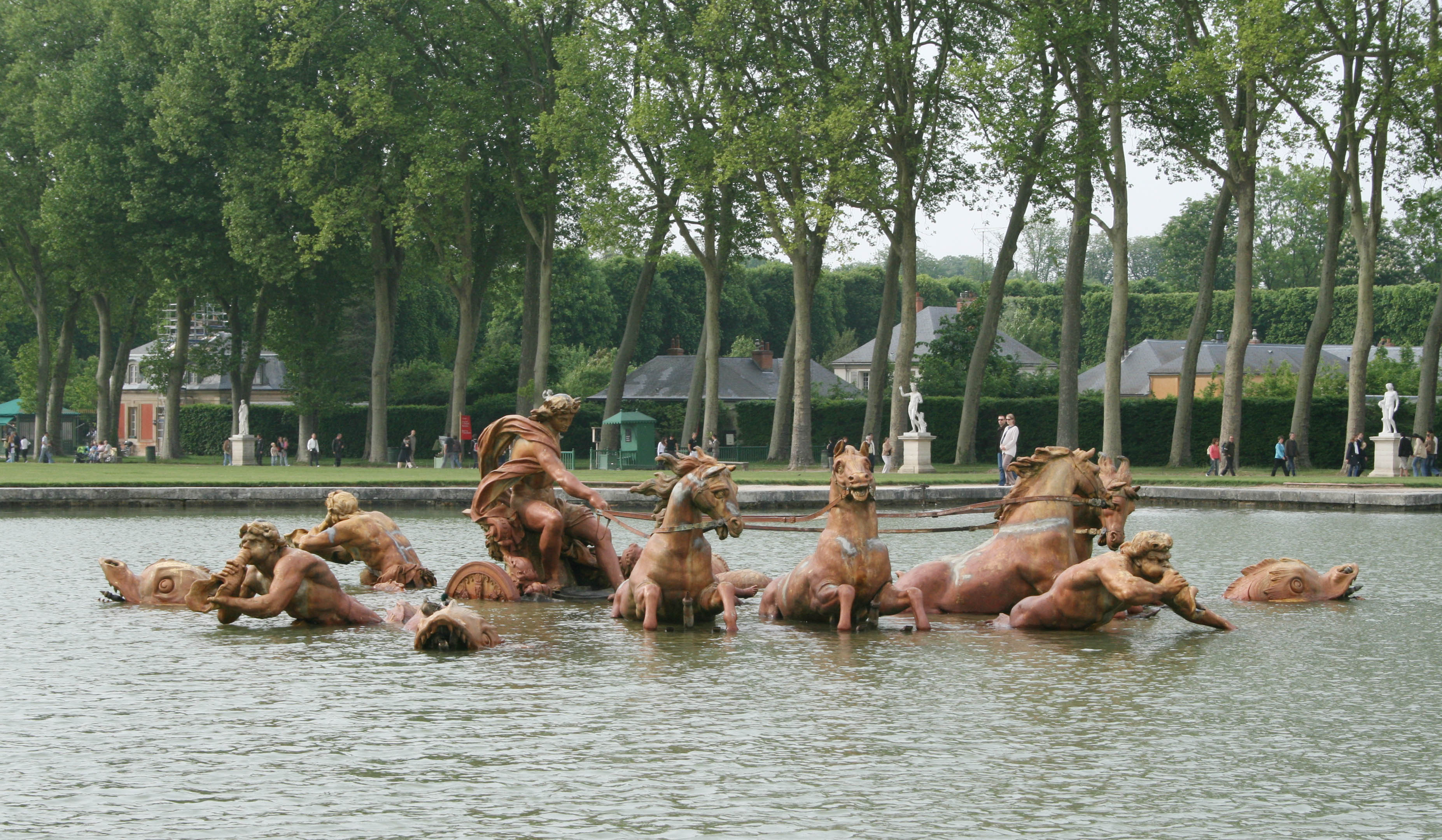
Fountain of Apollo (1668-1671)

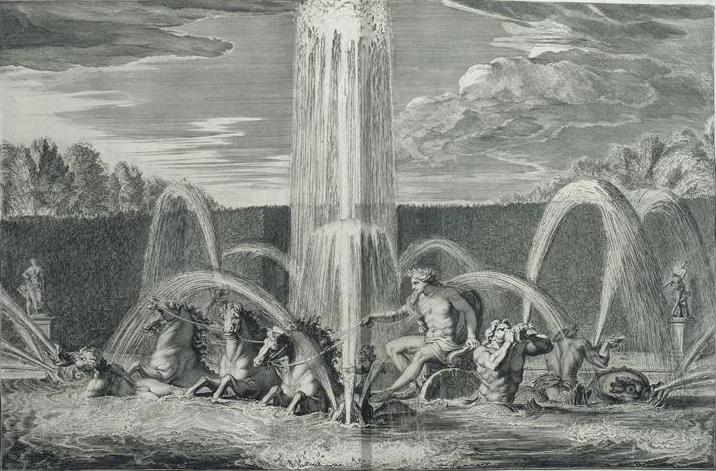
Engraving of Apollo and his Chariot in 1683

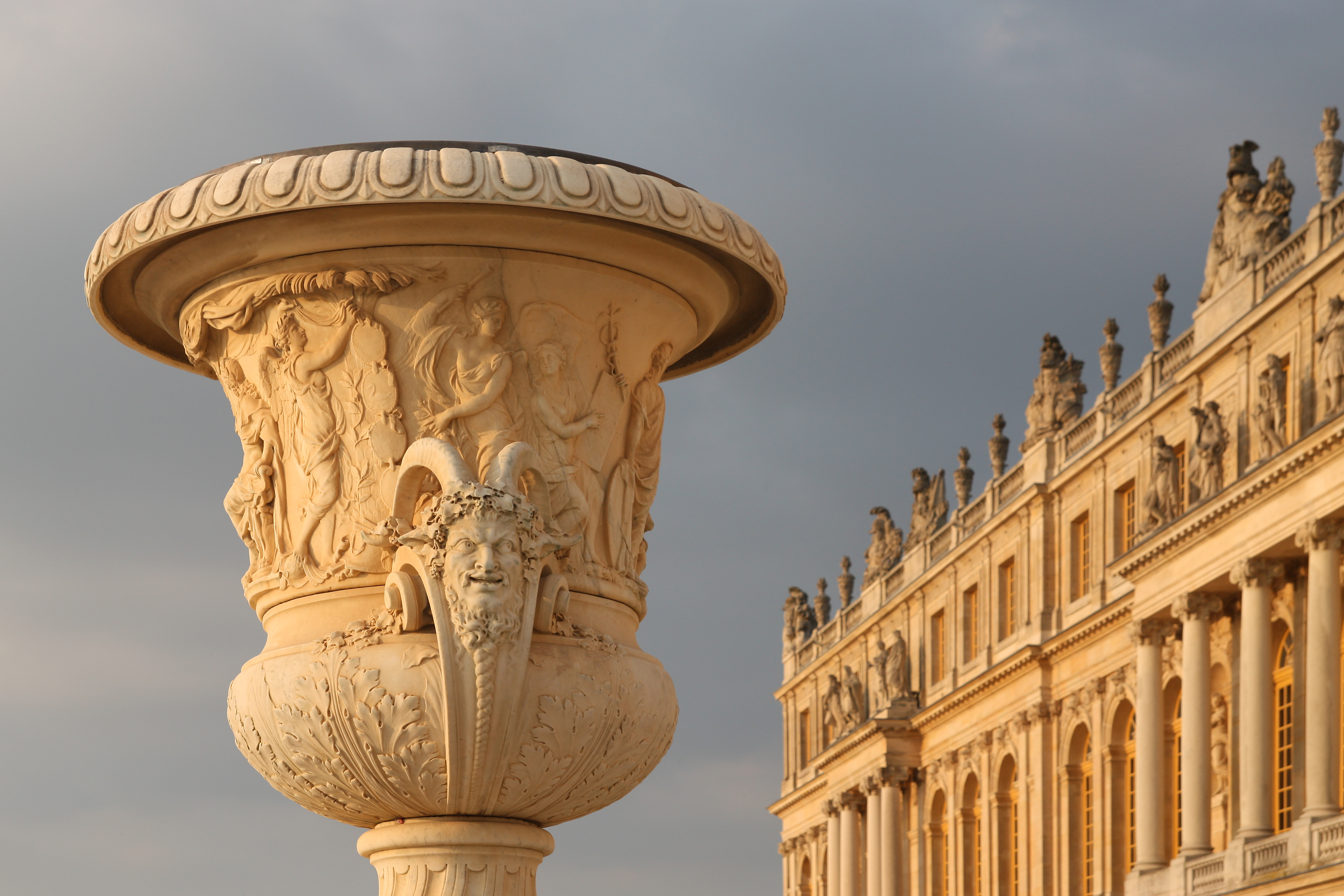
The Vase of Peace (1685-1686).

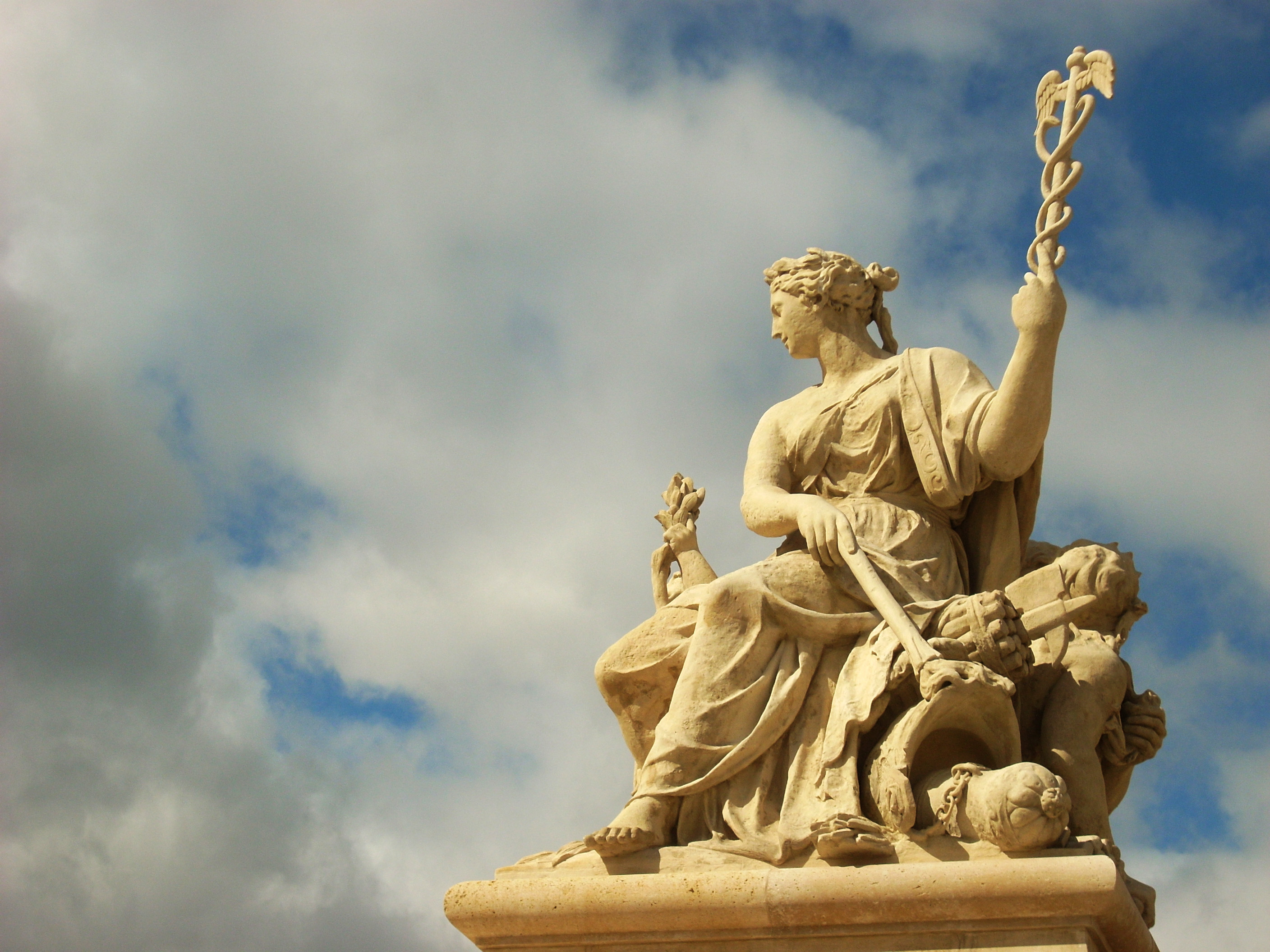
La Paix (Peace) (1685-86)

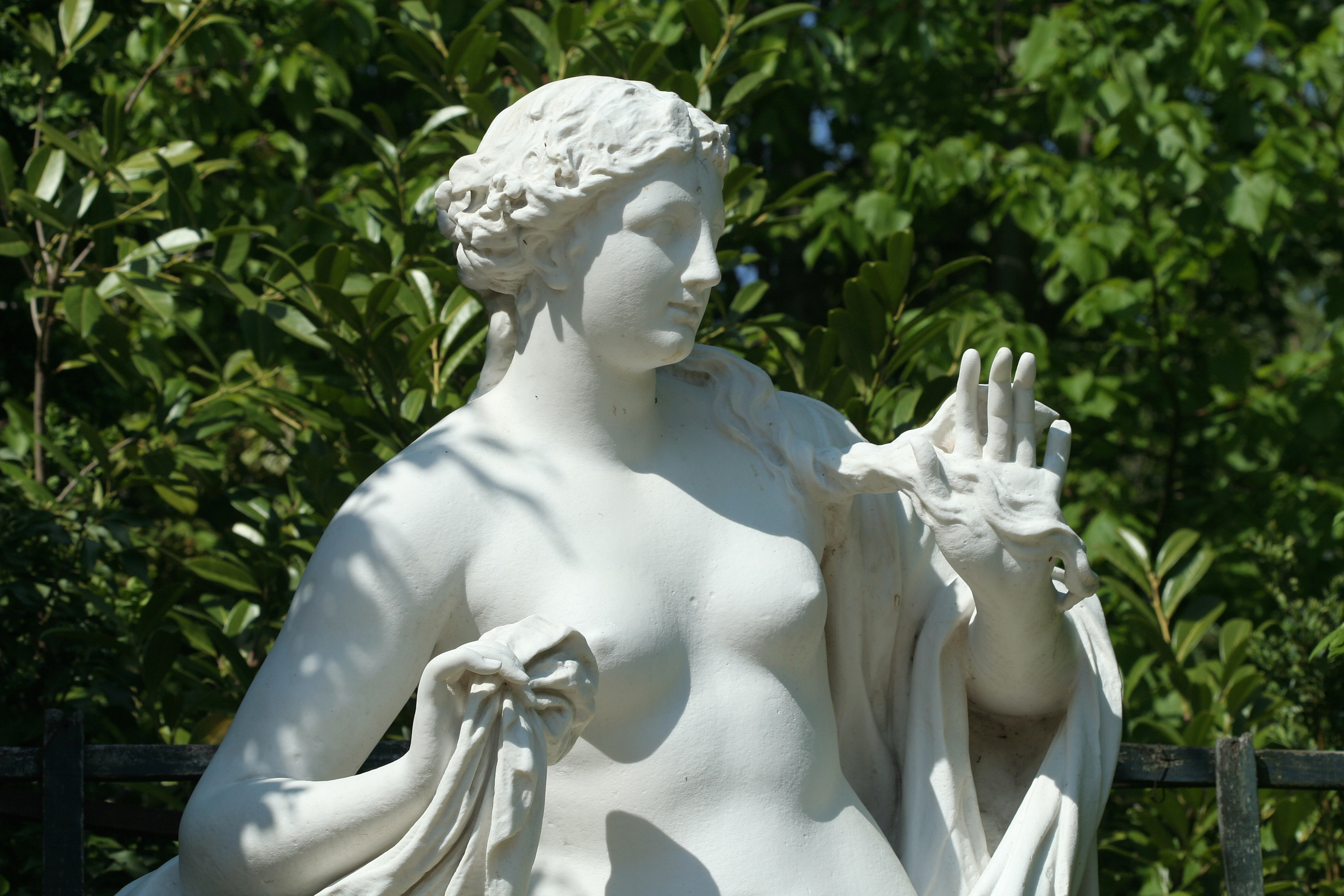
Galatée, Bosquet des Dômes (1667-75)

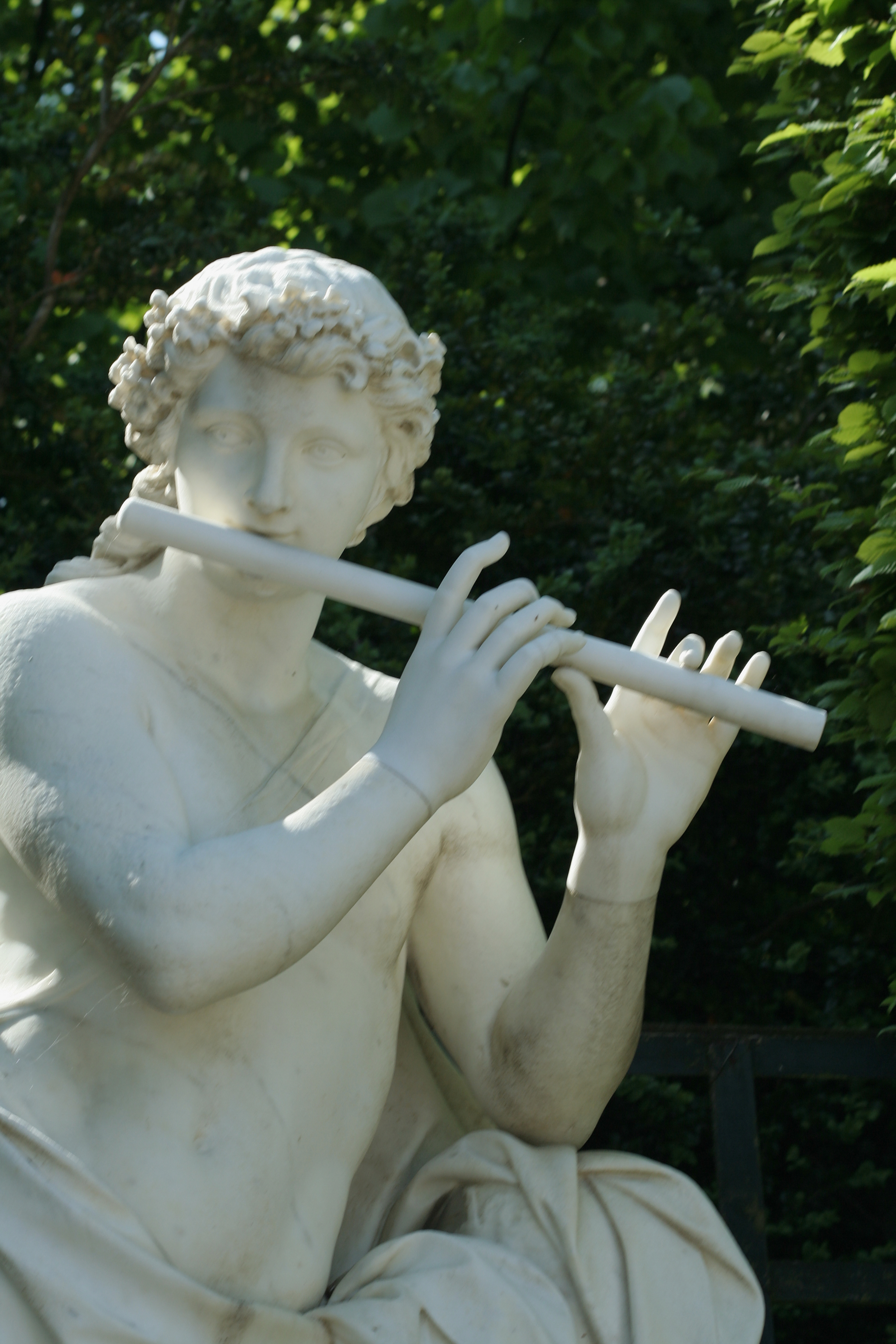
Acis playing his flute, Bosquet des Dômes (1667-75)

== Other sculpture ==
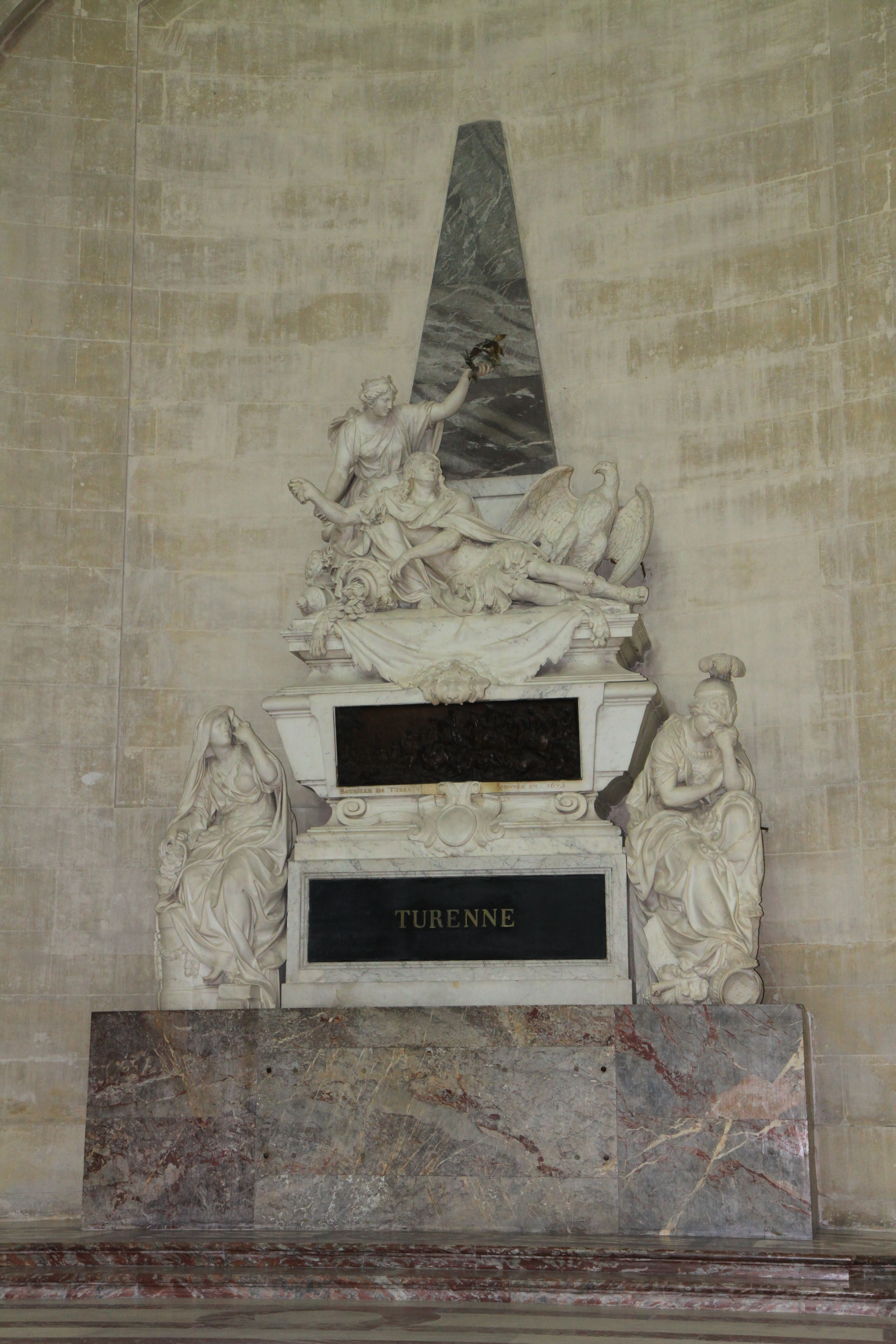
Funeral monument of Turenne at Les Invalides

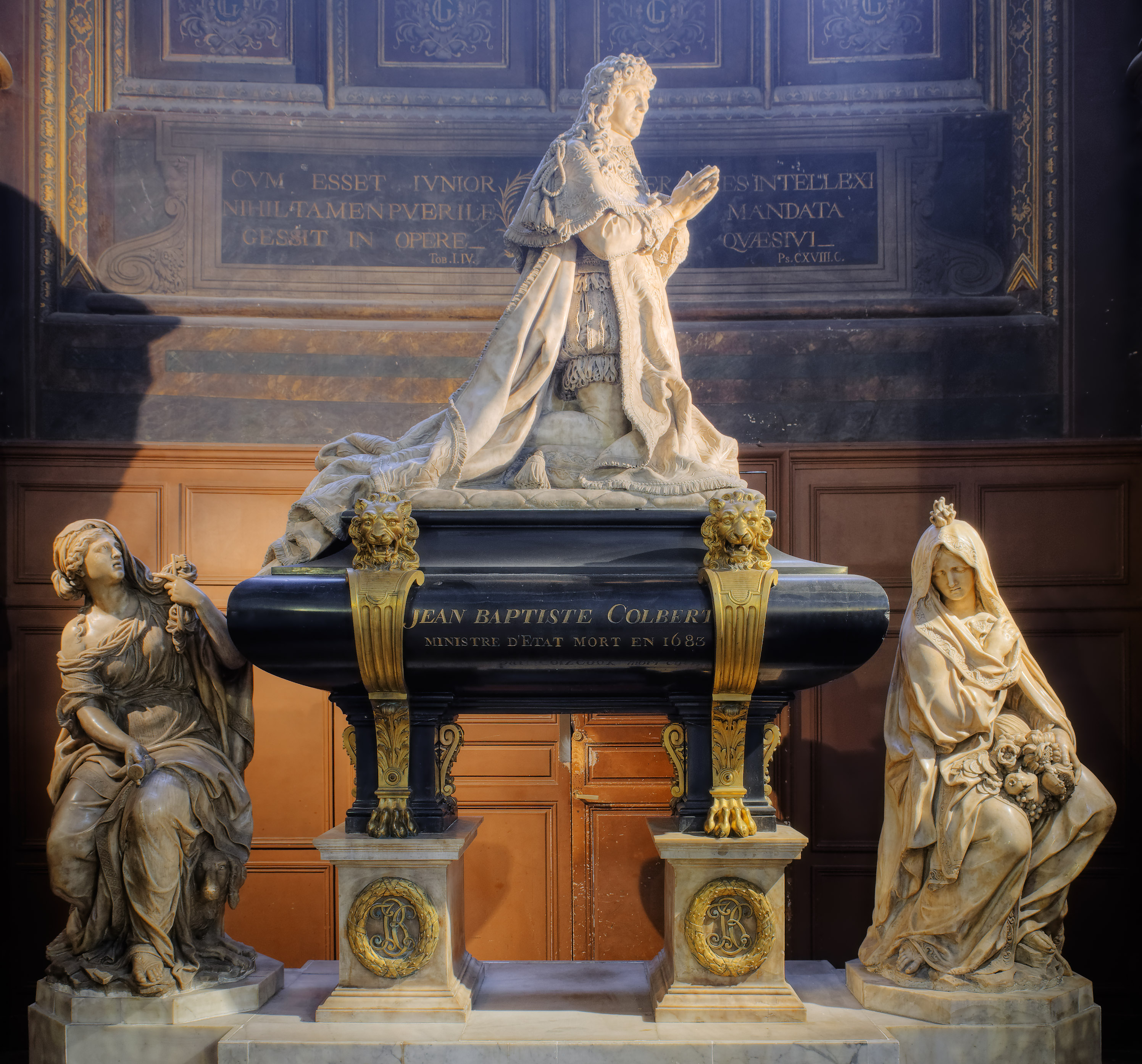
Secondary figures around tomb of Colbert, Church of St. Eustache (1685)

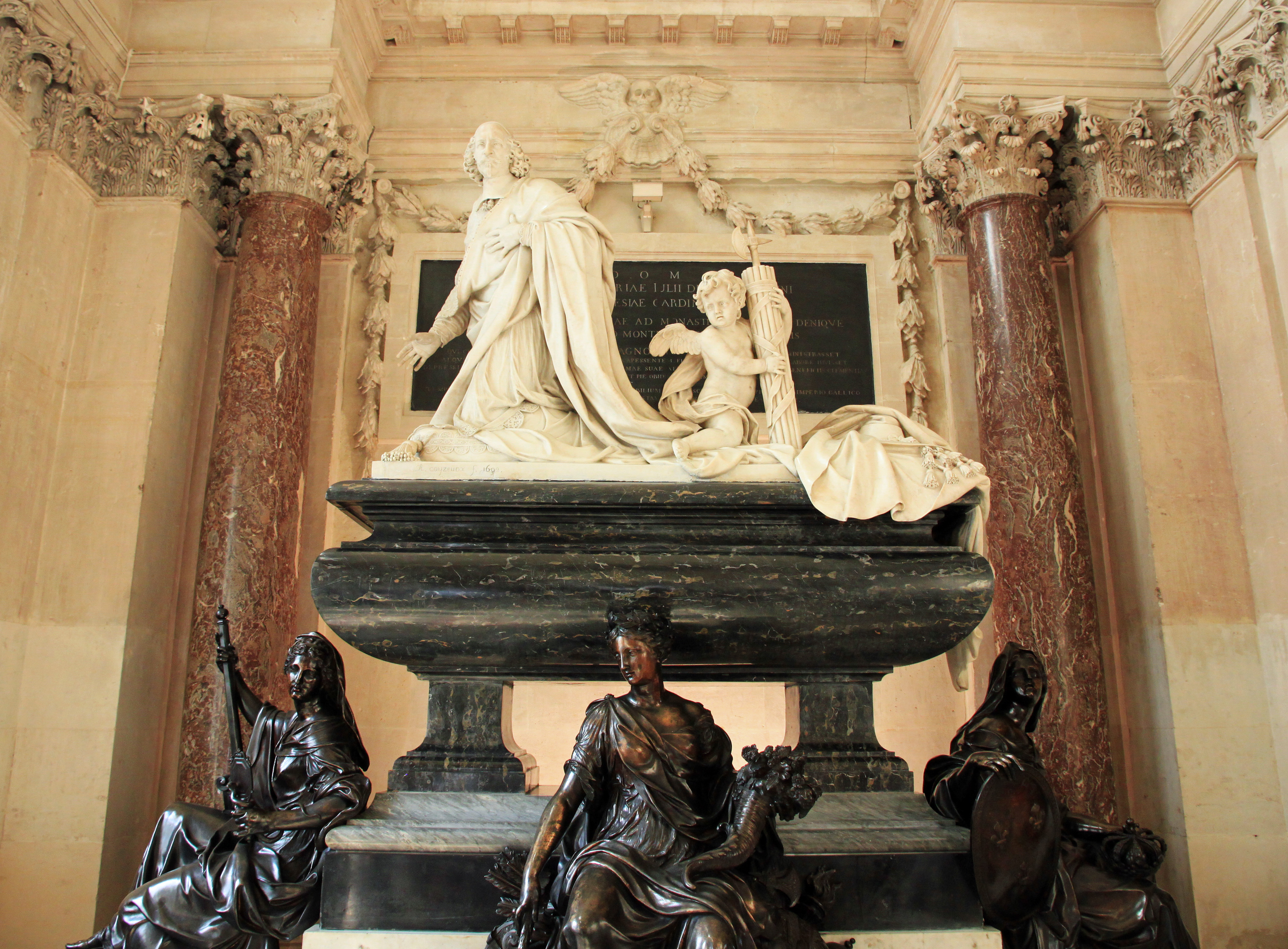
Secondary figures around tomb of Cardinal Mazarin, Institute of France

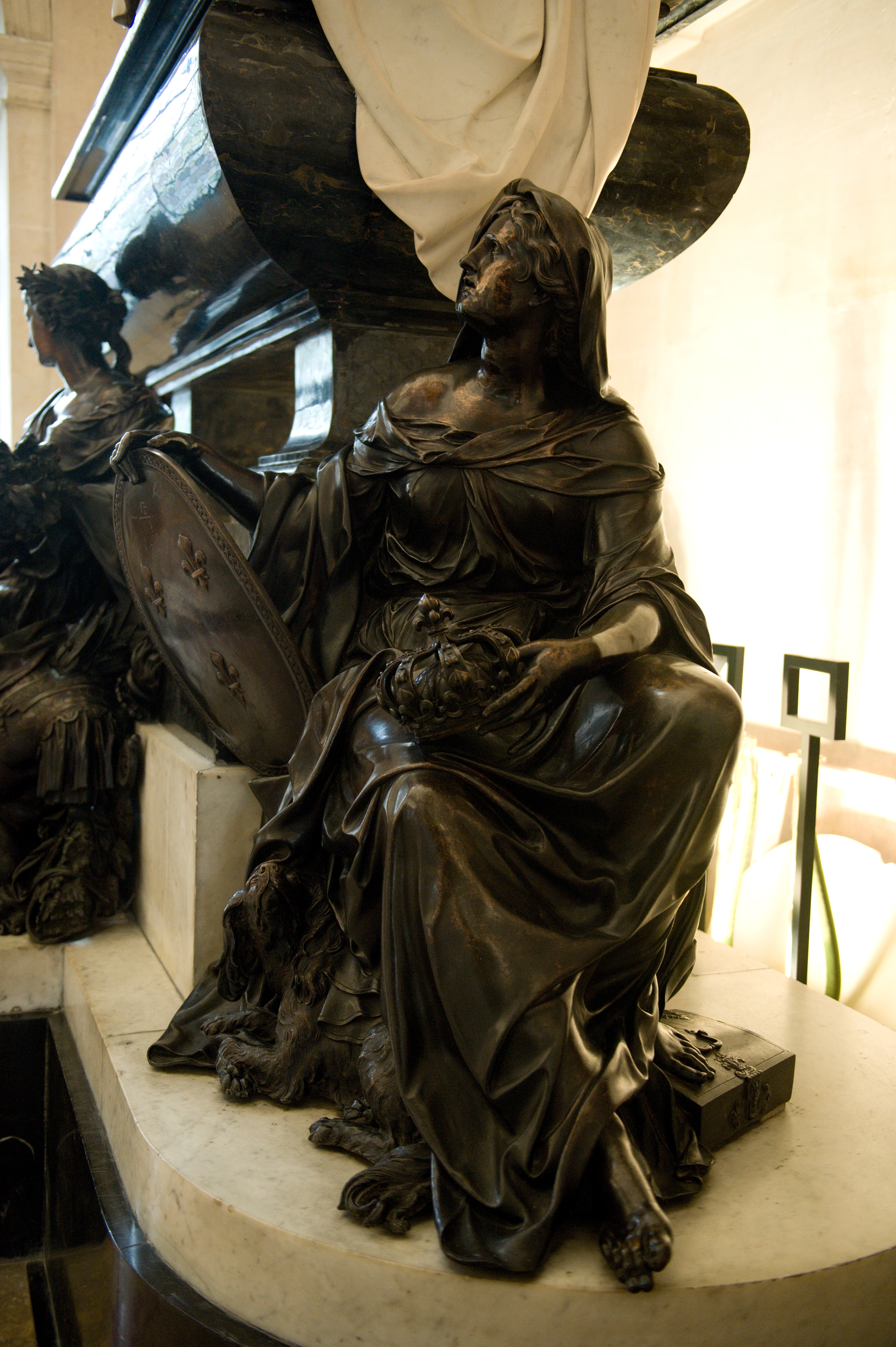
Statue of Fidelity for the tomb of Cardinal Mazarin, Institute of France

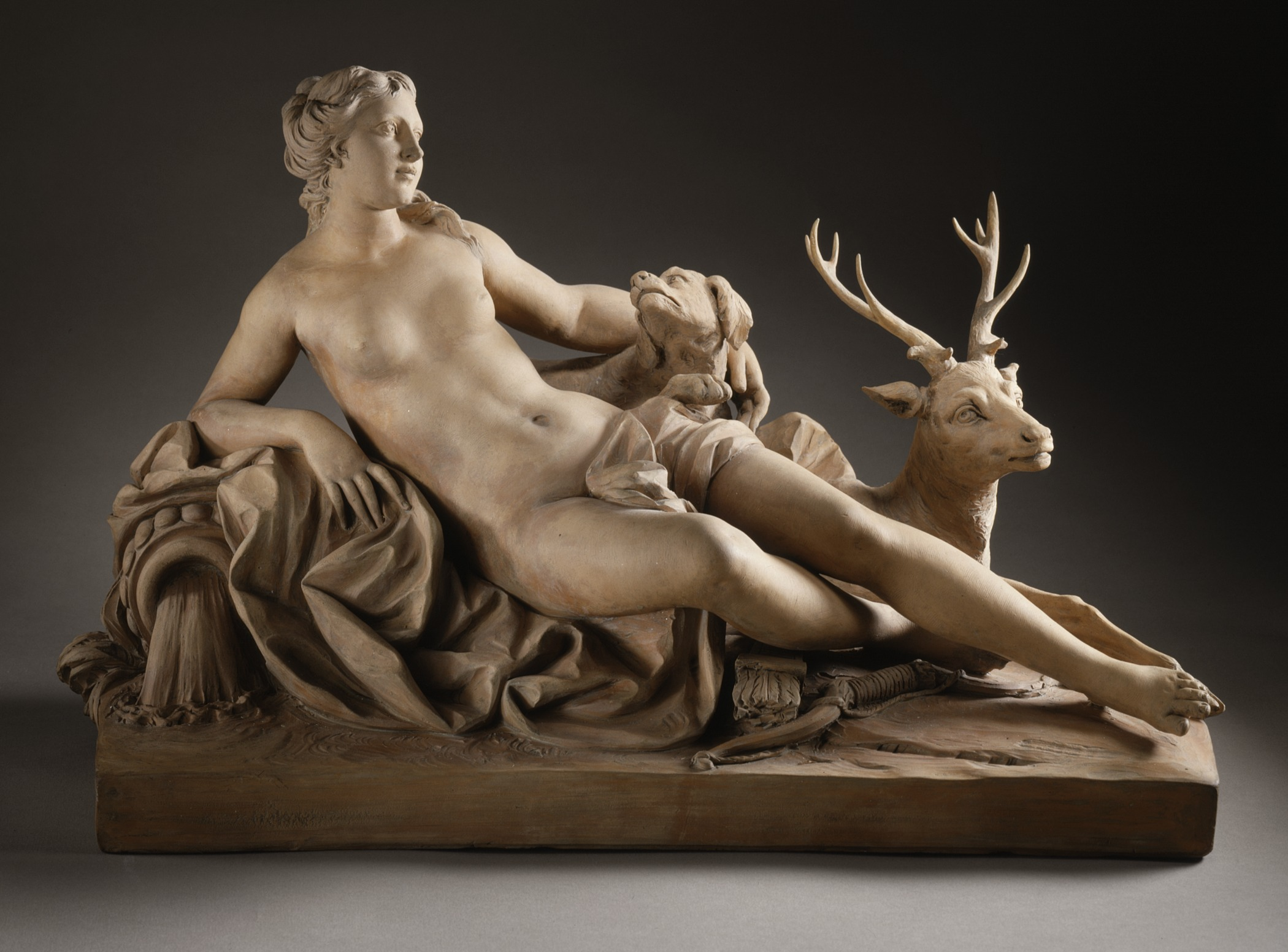
Diana with a stag and a dog, terra cotta, Los Angeles County Museum of Art (1687)

== Bibliography ==
- Geese, Uwe, Section on Baroque sculpture in L'Art Baroque - Architecture - Sculpture - Peinture (French translation from German), H.F. Ulmann, Cologne, 2015. (ISBN 978-3-8480-0856-8)
- Le Petit Robert des Noms Propres, Paris (2010), (ISBN 978-2-84902-740-0)
