= List of châteaux in Franche-Comté =

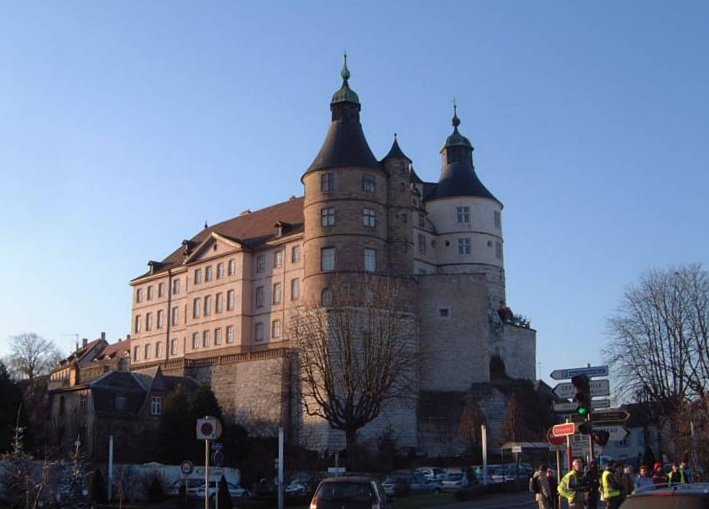
Château de Montbéliard

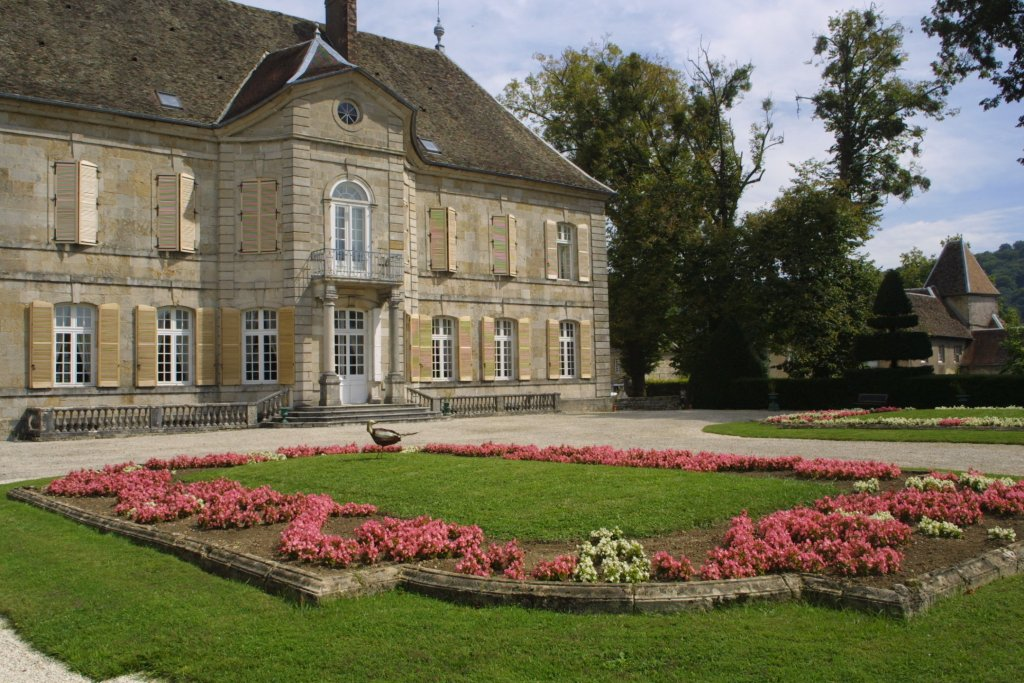
Château de Vaire-Le-Grand

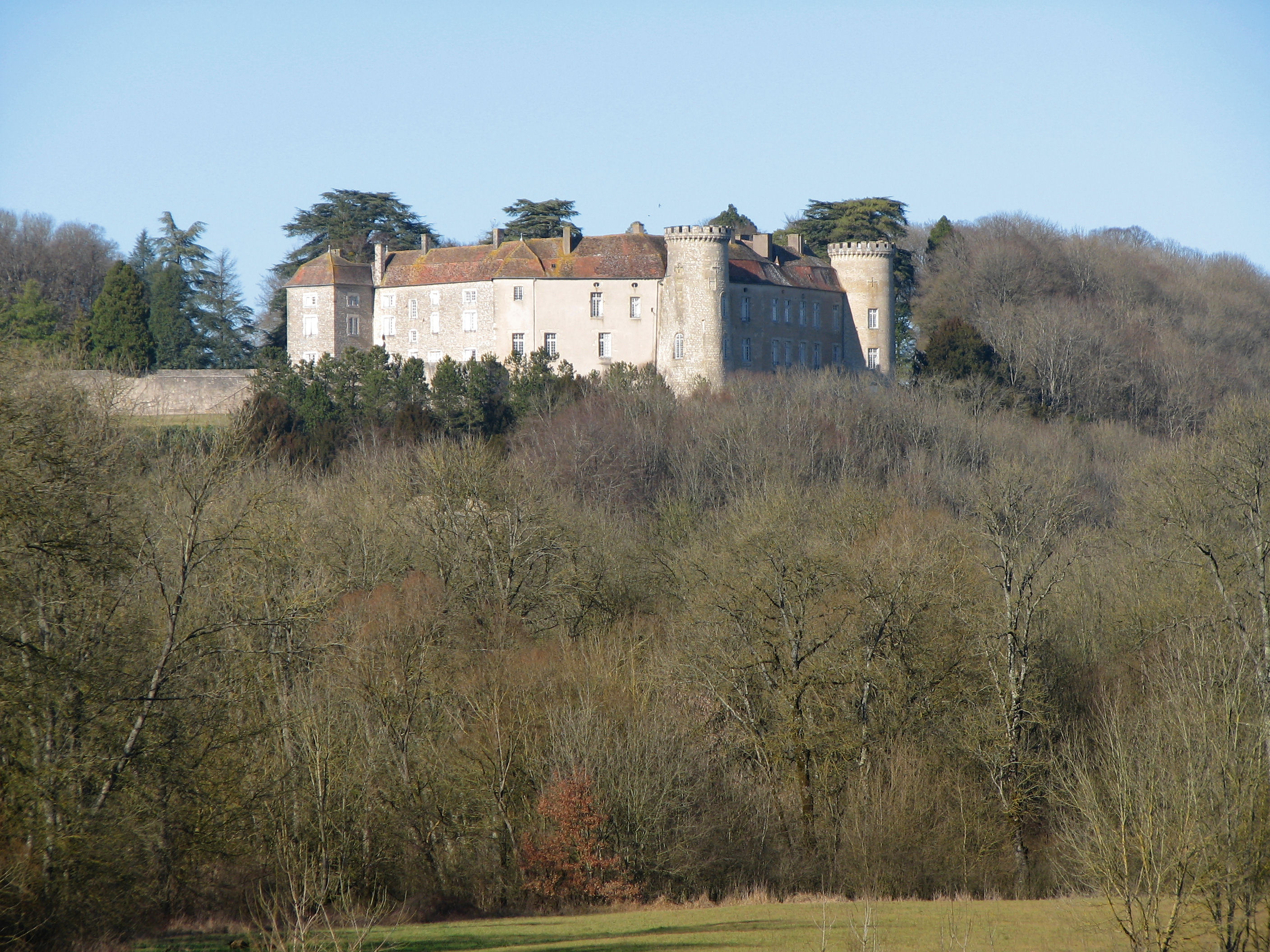
Château de Ray-sur-Saône

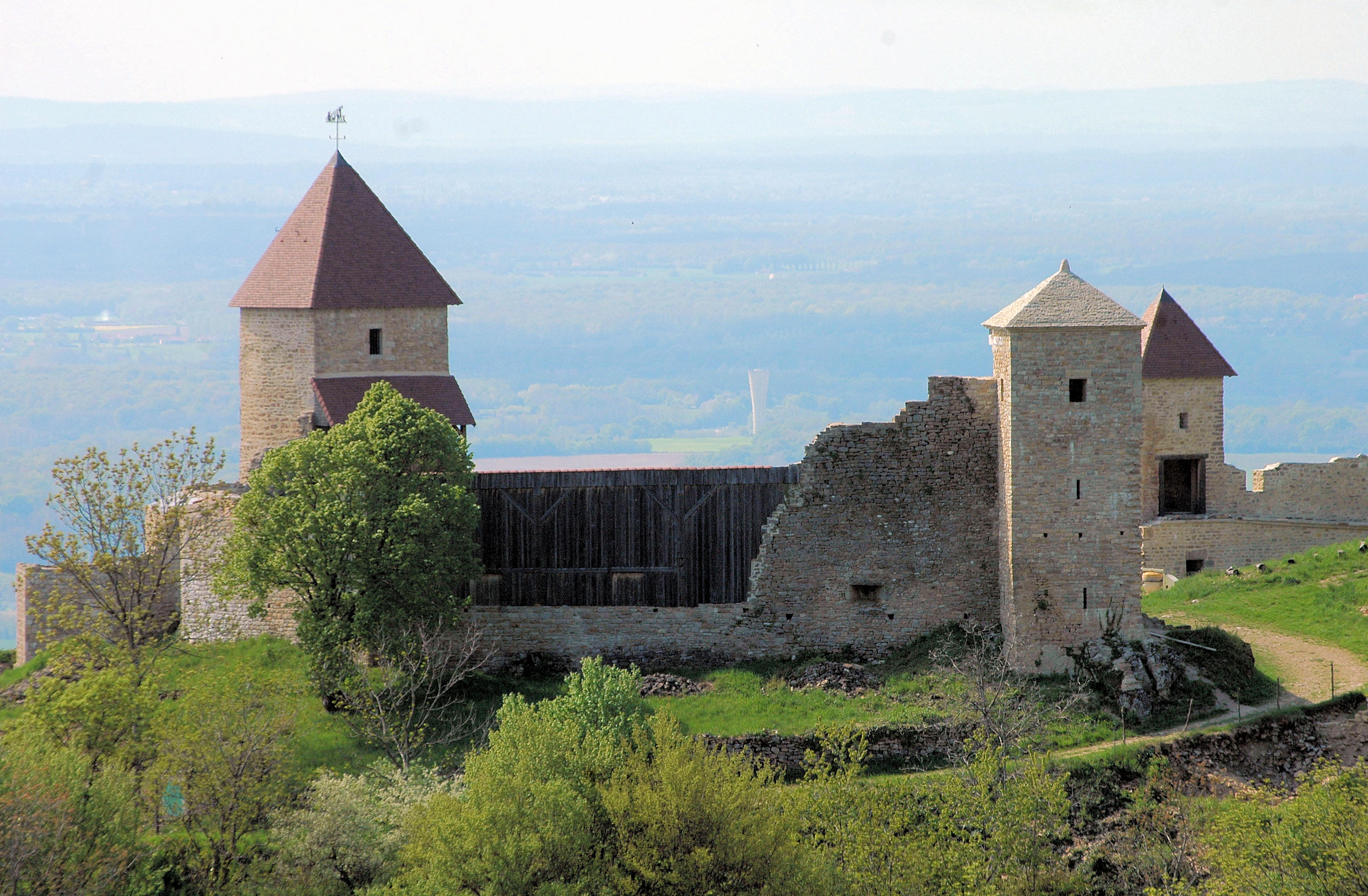
Château de Chevreaux

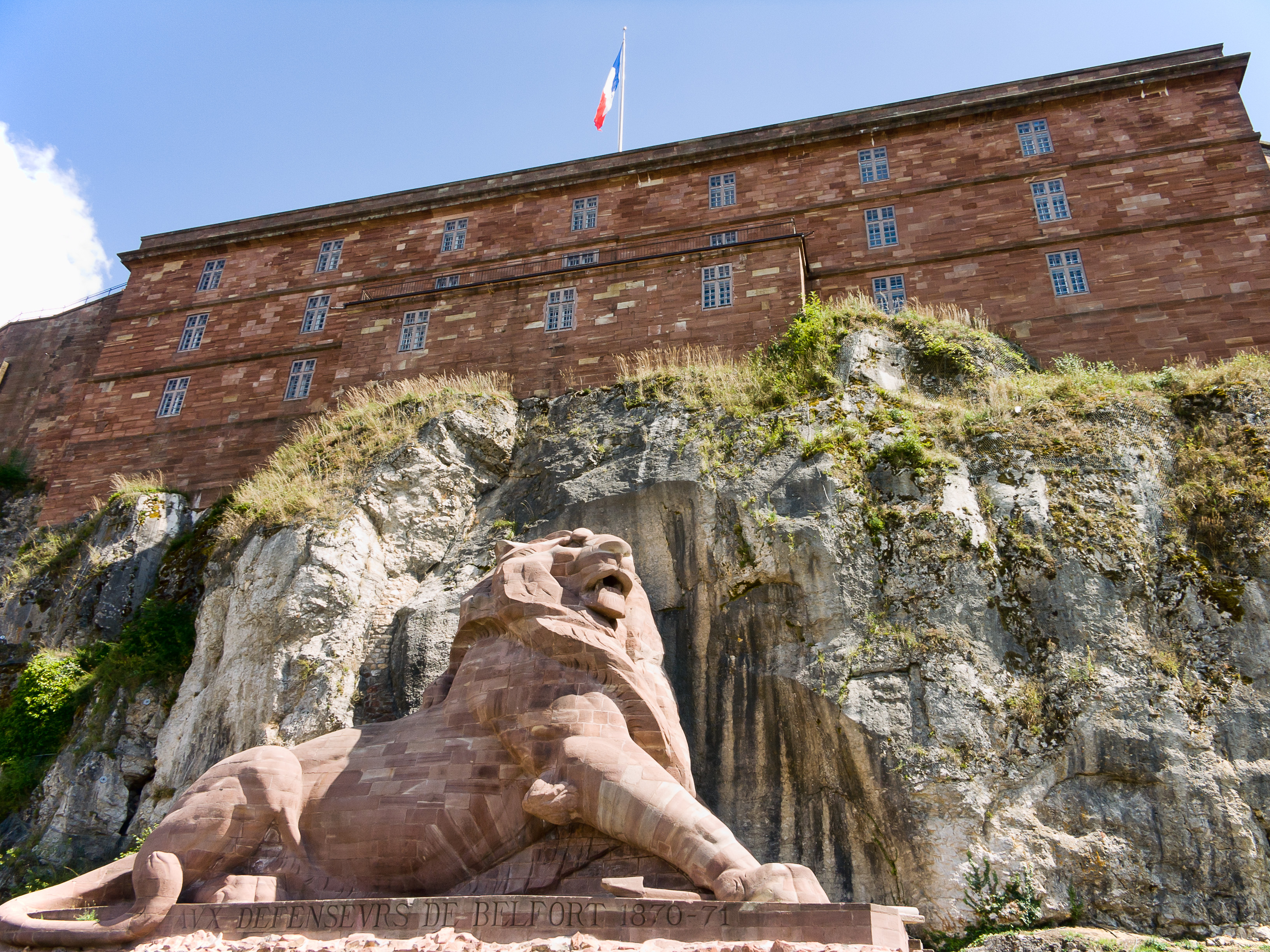
Château et lion de Belfort

This is the list of châteaux, which are located in the former region of Franche-Comté.

== Doubs ==
- Château des Archevêques, in Etalans
- Château de Belvoir, in Belvoir
- Citadelle de Besançon, in Besançon
- Château de Bournel, in Cubry
- Château de Chalamont, in Villers-sous-Chalamont
- Château de Charencey, in Chenecey-Buillon
- Château de Château de Châteauvieux, in Châteauvieux-les-Fossés
- Château de Châtel Derrière and Château des ducs de Wurtemberg, in Montbéliard
- Château de Cléron, in Cléron
- Château de Corcondray, in Corcondray
- Château de Durnes, in Durnes
- Château de Fertans, in Fertans
- Château de Fourg, in Fourg
- Château de Franois, in Franois
- Château de Goux les Usiers, in Goux-les-Usiers
- Château de Joux, in Joux
- Château de Montby, in Gondenans-Montby
- Château du Désert, in Maîche
- Château de Mérode, in Maîche
- Château de Montalembert, in Maîche
- Château de l'Hermitage, in Mancenans-Lizerne
- Château de Montfaucon, in Montfaucon
- Château de Montferrand, in Montferrand-le-Château
- Château de Montjoie, in Montjoie-le-Château
- Château de Montrond, in Montrond-le-Château
- Château de d'Ornans, in Ornans
- Château de Puy de Montenot, in Arc-sous-Montenot
- Château de La Roche, in Rigney
- Château de Roche-sur-Loue, in Arc-et-Senans
- Château de Rochejean, in Rochejean
- Château de Roulans, in Roulans
- Château de Saint-Denis, in Chassagne-Saint-Denis
- Château de Sainte-Anne, in Sainte-Anne
- Château de Sombacour, in Sombacour
- Château de Thoraise, in Thoraise
- Château de Vaire-Le-Grand, in Vaire-Arcier
- Château de Vuillafans, in Vuillafans

== Haute-Saône ==
- Château de Borey, in Borey
- Château d'Étobon, in Étobon
- Château de Filain, in Filain
- Château des Grammont, in Villersexel
- Château de Granges-le-Bourg, in Granges-le-Bourg
- Château de Héricourt, in Héricourt
- Château d'Oricourt, in Oricourt
- Château de Ray-sur-Saône, in Ray-sur-Saône
- Château de Vallerois-le-Bois, in Vallerois-le-Bois

== Jura ==
- Château d'Andelot, in Andelot-Morval
- Château d'Arlay, in Arlay
- Château de Baume, in Saint-Lothain
- Château de Chevreaux, in Chevreaux
- Château de Cornod, in Cornod
- Château de Domblans, in Domblans
- Château de Dramelay, in Dramelay
- Château de Frontenay, in Frontenay
- Château Gréa, in Rotalier
- Château de Mérona, in Mérona
- Château de Mirebel, in Mirebel
- Château de Mutigney in Mutigney
- Château de la Muyre, in Domblans
- Château d'Oliferne, in Vescles
- Château d'Ougney, in Ougney
- Château de Présilly, in Présilly
- Château de Pymont, in Villeneuve-sous-Pymont
- Château de Syam, in Champagnole

== Territoire de Belfort ==
- Château de Belfort, in Belfort
- Château du Rosemont, in Riervescemont
- Château de Rougemont, in Rougemont-le-Château

== See also ==
- List of castles in France
