= Hauteroche =

Hauteroche may refer to:

- Noël Lebreton de Hauteroche, a 17th-century French actor and playwright
- Hauteroche, Côte-d'Or, a commune in France
- Hauteroche, Jura, a commune in France
- Hauteroche Castle, a castle in Belgium
