= Jean de Vienne (bishop, died 1382) =

Burgundian nobleman, prelate and prince of the Holy Roman Empire

Seal of Jean de Vienne

Jean de Vienne (German: Johann; died 7 October 1382) was a Burgundian nobleman, prelate and prince of the Holy Roman Empire. He served as the archbishop of Besançon from 1355 until his transfer to the diocese of Metz in 1361. He was transferred to the prince-bishopric of Basel in 1365. In all three dioceses, he was unable to live peacefully with the townspeople, finally resulting in open warfare in Basel. In each of his bishoprics he was the third bishop of his name, Jean III.

Jean's father was Gauthier or Vauthier (died 1344), the lord of Mirebel. His mother was Achillande, the heiress of the lordship of La Roche-en-Montagne.

In 1337, Jean was a canon and choirmaster of the diocese of Chalon. In 1339, he was the treasurer of the cathedral of Saint-Jean in Besançon. Shortly after, he became the dean of Besançon's church of Sainte-Madeleine.

On 8 June 1355, Jean was appointed to succeed his relative, either an uncle or a second cousin, Hugues de Vienne, as archbishop of Besançon. His archiepiscopate was not a success. In 1356, he served as a councilor to Philip, count of Burgundy. He then got involved in a conflict with the citizens of Besançon, a free imperial city. As a result, he was transferred to the see of Metz on 15 November 1361 by Pope Innocent VI.

In Metz, another free imperial city, Jean encountered the same problem keeping peace with the citizens of the town. He moved the episcopal residence to Vic-sur-Seille, but on 13 August 1365 he was transferred to the diocese of Basel. There he encountered for the third time the same difficulty in getting along with the citizens of a free imperial city, owing to his vigorous assertion of the church's temporal rights. He also fell out with his own cathedral chapter. He went to war over Nidau with the noble families of Kyburg and Thierstein. When the episcopal town of Bienne made an alliance with Bern, it was burned to the ground by Jean. The Bernese responded by burning the episcopal property in the city. The bishop was finally defeated in battle at Malleray in 1367.

The diocese of Basel was heavily in debt when Jean took it over. After years of war, he was forced to pledge his minting rights and his control of customs and tolls in order to raise money. He resided primarily at Delémont. At the start of the Western Schism in 1378, Jean supported the Antipope Clement VII of Avignon, for which he was excommunicated by Pope Urban VI of Rome.

Jean died at Porrentruy and was buried there in the parish church of Saint-Pierre.
