= Marie-Louise Gagneur =

French feminist writer

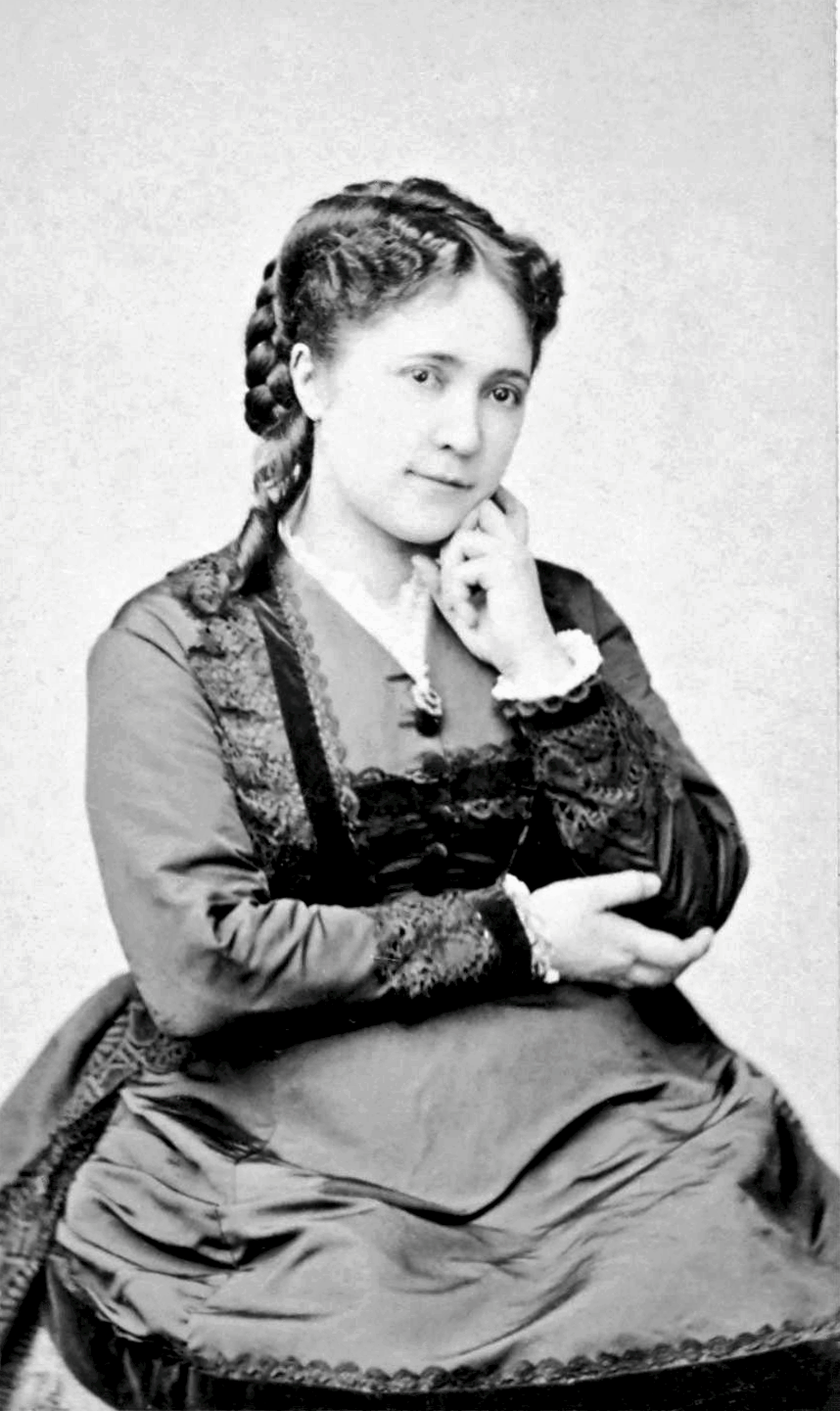
- Gagneur in 1872.
- Born: Marie-Louise Mignerot; 25 May 1832; Domblans, France
- Died: 17 February 1902 (aged 69); Paris, France
- Occupation: Writer
- Spouse: Wladimir Gagneur
- Writing career
- Language: French
- Movement: Feminism

Marie-Louise Gagneur (née Mignerot, 25 May 1832 – 17 February 1902) was a French feminist writer and activist. In 1901, she was awarded the Legion of Honour.

== Personal life ==
Mignerot was born in Domblans to Césarine Martin, who worked for Charles Fourier, and Claude Corneille Mignerot. She was brought up at a convent, where she disagreed with the religious education. She married Wladimir Gagneur in 1856 or 1857. Gagneur was 25 years older than her, and had fought in the French Revolution of 1848.

== Career ==
Gagneur wrote essays, short stories and novels. Her works focused on anti-clericalism, especially when she was writing during the Franco-Prussian War. In 1855, she produced the pamphlet Projet d’association industrielle et domestique pour les classes ouvrières (Project of industrial and domestic association for the working classes), which was noticed by Wladimir Gagneur.

Gagneur wrote more than 20 novels. Her first novel was Le Siècle (The Century). La Croisade noire (The Black Crusade, 1864), an anti-clerical novel set in the 1850s, had five editions by 1872, and is believed to have been based on her experiences growing up in a convent. The novel was also reprinted in a local newspaper. Her 1870 book Les Vierges Russes (The Russian Virgins) was translated into English in 1871. Other notable works include Une expiation (An Atonement, 1859), Le Roman d’un prêtre (The Novel of a Priest, 1882), and Le Crime de l’Abbé Maufrac (The Crime of Abbott Maufrac, 1882).

In 1864, Gagneur joined the Société des gens de lettres. In 1891, she challenged the Académie française on their anti-feminist views, asking for the feminisation of names. During her life, she also called for reform of French divorce laws. In 1901, she was awarded a Chevalier (Knight) of the Legion of Honour.

Throughout her writing career, Gagneur was deeply engaged with the feminist scene. Many of her works explore contemporary issues concerning the status of women in society. Particularly, she examines the systemic subordination of women by government and religious institutions. In 1867 Gagneur published Le Calvaire des Femmes [The Ordeals of Women]. In this social novel, Gagneur highlights the suffering of working-class women in an era of great corruption, extravagance, and injustice of Second Empire France. One quote from this work well summarizes her position in the feminist field. "En France comme en Amérique, et pour la femme comme pour l'homme, il n'y a de dignité possible qu'avec la liberté. La femme ne doit point être placée sous la tutelle absolue de l'homme" [In France as in America, and for women like men, there is no possible dignity without liberty. Women have no place under the fist of man].

== Notable works ==
- Une expiation (An Atonement), 1859
- La Croisade noire (The Black Crusade), 1864
- Les Vierges Russes (The Russian Virgins), 1870
- Le Roman d’un prêtre (The Novel of a Priest), 1882
- Le Crime de l’Abbé Maufrac (The Crime of Abbott Maufrac), 1882
- Le Calvaire des Femmes (The Ordeals of Women), 1867
