= Château de Mutigney =

Coordinates: 47.2780°N 5.5455°E

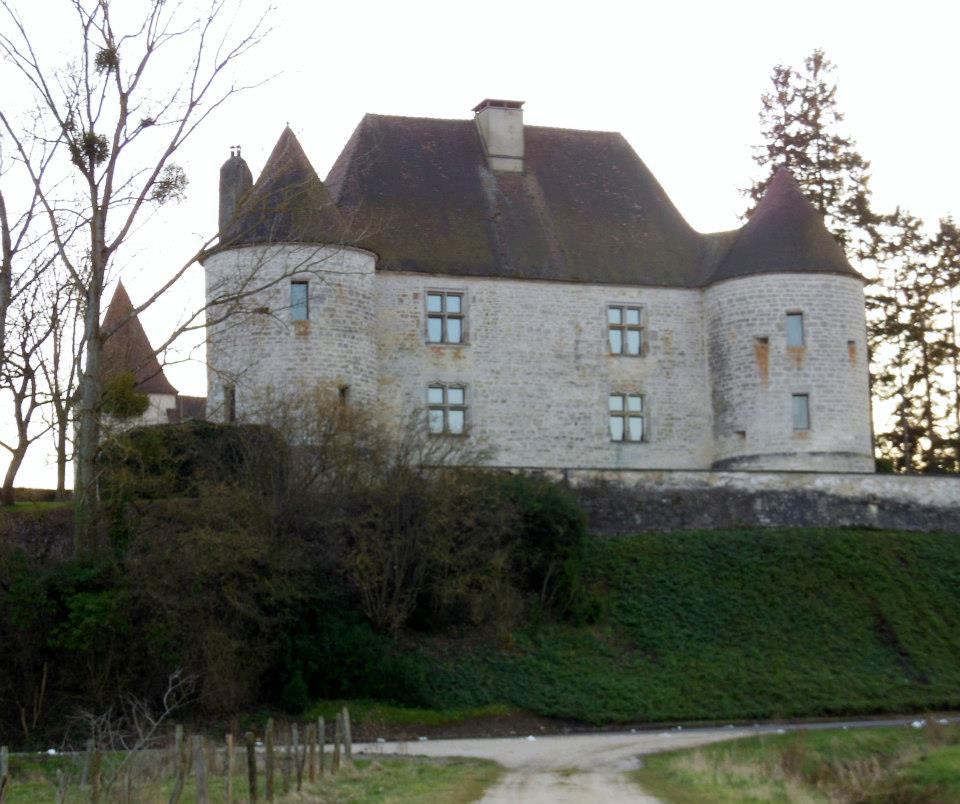
- Interactive map of the Château de Mutigney area

The Château de Mutigney is a castle in Mutigney, Jura, Franche-Comté, France.

== History ==
It was built in the 15th century.

== Architectural significance ==
It has been listed as an official historical monument by the French Ministry of Culture since 1971.
