= Crançot =

- Part of Hauteroche
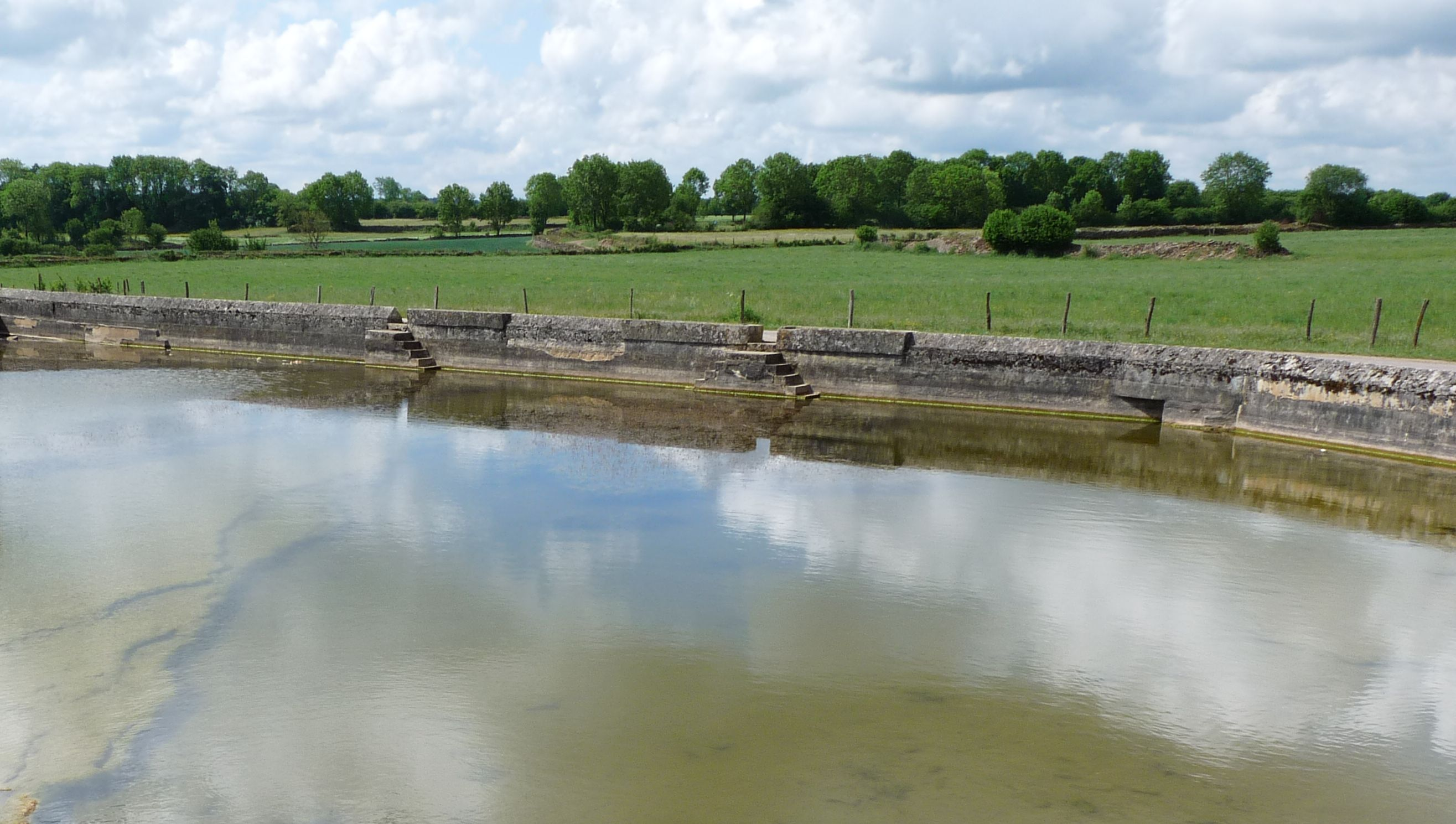
- The Sauget
- Location of Crançot
- Location within France Location within Bourgogne-Franche-Comté
- Coordinates: 46°41′13″N 5°39′38″E
- Country: France
- Region: Bourgogne-Franche-Comté
- Department: Jura
- Arrondissement: Lons-le-Saunier
- Canton: Poligny
- Commune: Hauteroche
- Area^{1}: 14.37 km^{2} (5.55 sq mi)
- Highest elevation: 561 m (1,841 ft)
- Lowest elevation: 450 m (1,480 ft)
- Population (2018): 596
  - Density: 41.5/km^{2} (107/sq mi)
- Time zone: UTC+01:00 (CET)
  - Summer (DST): UTC+02:00 (CEST)
- Postal code: 39570
- ^{1} French Land Register data, which excludes lakes, ponds, glaciers > 1 km^{2} (0.386 sq mi or 247 acres) and river estuaries.

Crançot (French pronunciation: [kʁɑ̃so]; Arpitan: Cransou) is a former commune in the Jura department in Bourgogne-Franche-Comté in eastern France. On 1 January 2016, it was merged into the new commune of Hauteroche.

== Population ==
Historical population

Year	Pop.	±% p.a.
1793	580	—
1821	635	+0.32%
1846	687	+0.32%
1872	572	−0.70%
1901	422	−1.04%
1926	378	−0.44%
1946	366	−0.16%
1962	362	−0.07%

Year	Pop.	±% p.a.
1968	376	+0.63%
1975	355	−0.82%
1982	454	+3.58%
1990	485	+0.83%
1999	489	+0.09%
2006	484	−0.15%
2018	596	+1.75%

Source: EHESS and INSEE

== See also ==
- Communes of the Jura department
