= Château de Chevreaux =

Ruined castle in Chevreaux, France

Coordinates: 46°30′38″N 5°24′12″E

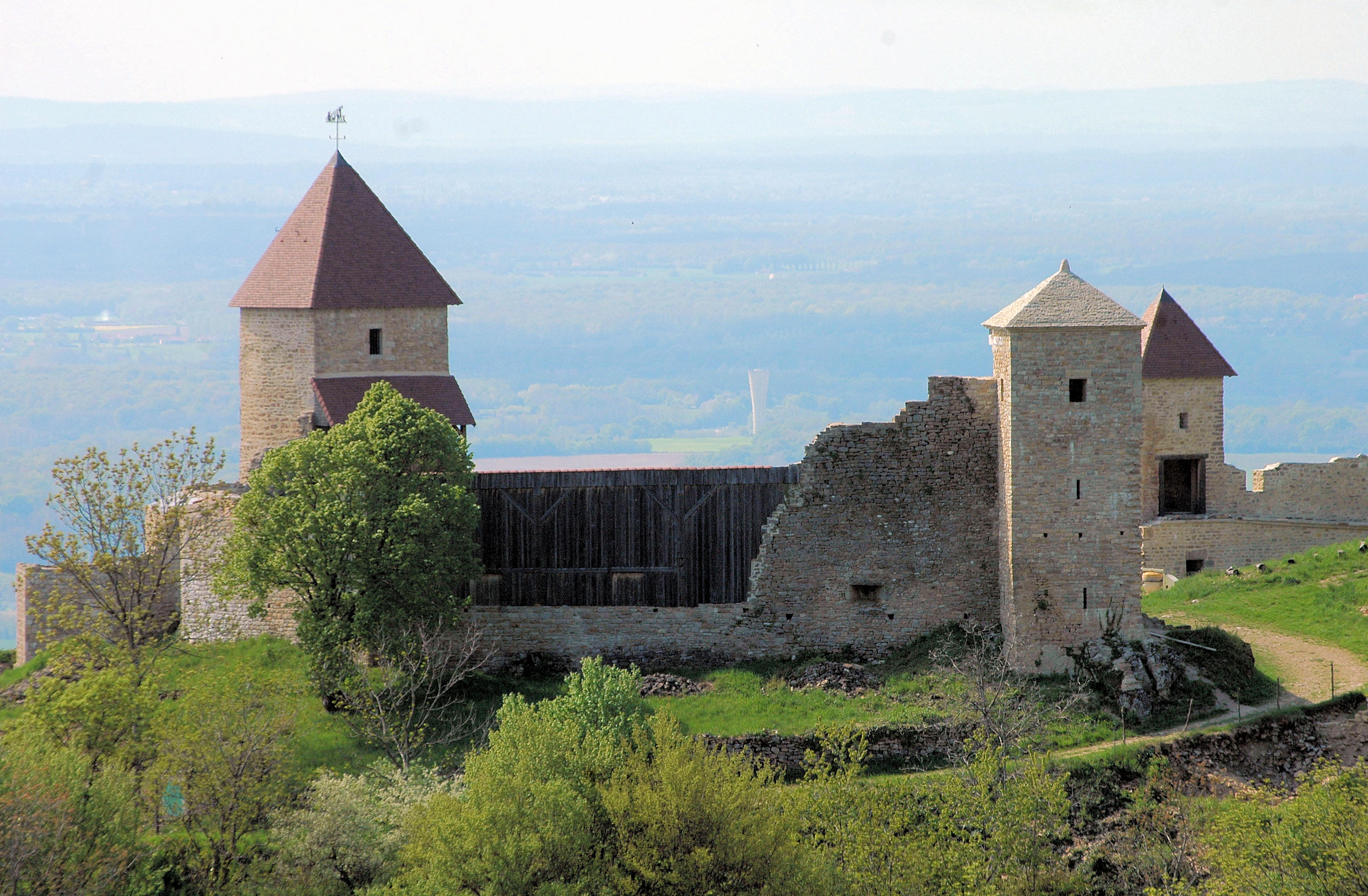
Château de Chevreaux

The Château de Chevreaux is a ruined castle in the commune of Chevreaux in the Jura département of France. At an altitude of 473 m, the castle dominates the Bresse plain.

== History ==
In 974, Manassès III, Lord of Coligny, gave his lands of "Chevrel" and "Chastel" to the monks of the Abbey of Gigny-sur-Suran. The castle was mentioned for the first time in 1158 in a document by the monks of the Abbaye du Miroir. It was the seat of a seigneurie that belonged successively to three families: Coligny (from its construction until 1332), Vienne (from 1332 to 1651), and then Damas.

A document from 1628 reported, "The castle and fortified house of Chevreaux, well served with towers and a good defensive curtain wall, where there are twelve rooms with fires, a chapel, a kitchen, wine store, and five or six barns and good vaulted cellars, along with stables, ovens, bakery and beautiful gardens."

On 2 April 1637, during the Ten Years' War in Franche-Comté, the Duke of Longueville besieged the castle, which he captured, pillaged and destroyed. The keep which had resisted his cannons was undermined and the fortifications were demolished.

Since 1990, the castle has benefited from restoration works. It is open to the public all year.

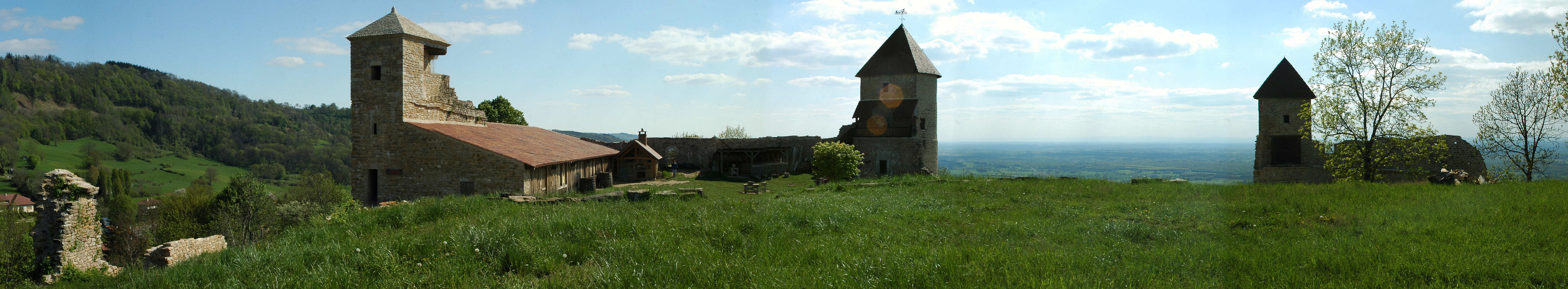
Panoramic view of Château de Chevreaux

== See also ==
- List of castles in France
