= Granges-sur-Baume =

- Part of Hauteroche
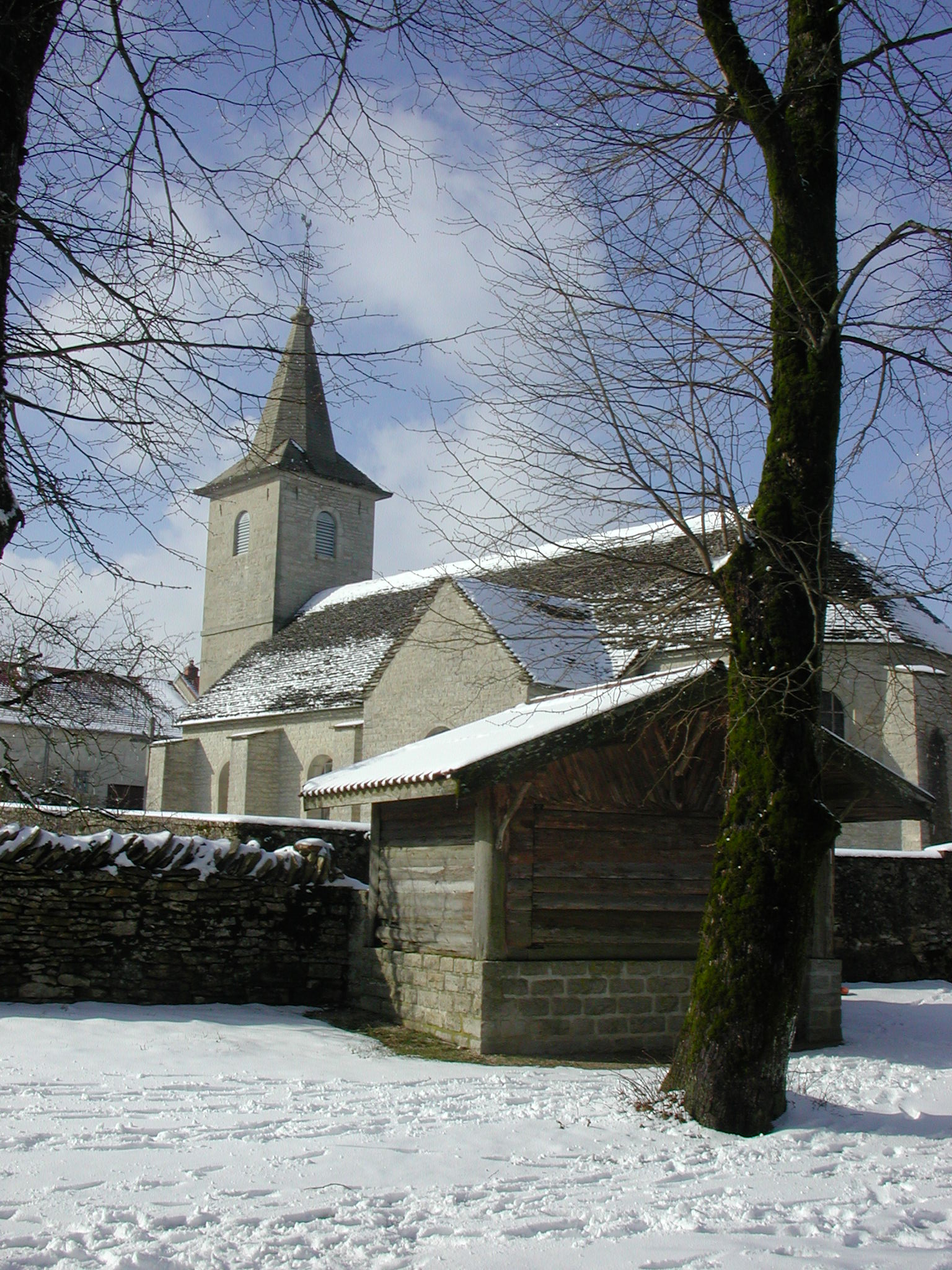
- Location of Granges-sur-Baume
- Location within France Location within Bourgogne-Franche-Comté
- Coordinates: 46°42′54″N 5°38′44″E
- Country: France
- Region: Bourgogne-Franche-Comté
- Department: Jura
- Arrondissement: Lons-le-Saunier
- Canton: Poligny
- Commune: Hauteroche
- Area^{1}: 7.93 km^{2} (3.06 sq mi)
- Highest elevation: 550 m (1,800 ft)
- Lowest elevation: 400 m (1,300 ft)
- Population (2018): 130
  - Density: 16/km^{2} (42/sq mi)
- Time zone: UTC+01:00 (CET)
  - Summer (DST): UTC+02:00 (CEST)
- Postal code: 39210
- ^{1} French Land Register data, which excludes lakes, ponds, glaciers > 1 km^{2} (0.386 sq mi or 247 acres) and river estuaries.

Granges-sur-Baume (French pronunciation: [ɡʁɑ̃ʒ syʁ bom], literally Granges on Baume; Arpitan: Grandzës-tsu-Bâme) is a former commune in the Jura department in Bourgogne-Franche-Comté in eastern France. On 1 January 2016, it was merged into the new commune of Hauteroche.

== See also ==
- Communes of the Jura department
