= Château de Cléron =

Castle in Cléron, France

Coordinates: 47°05′16″N 6°03′27″E

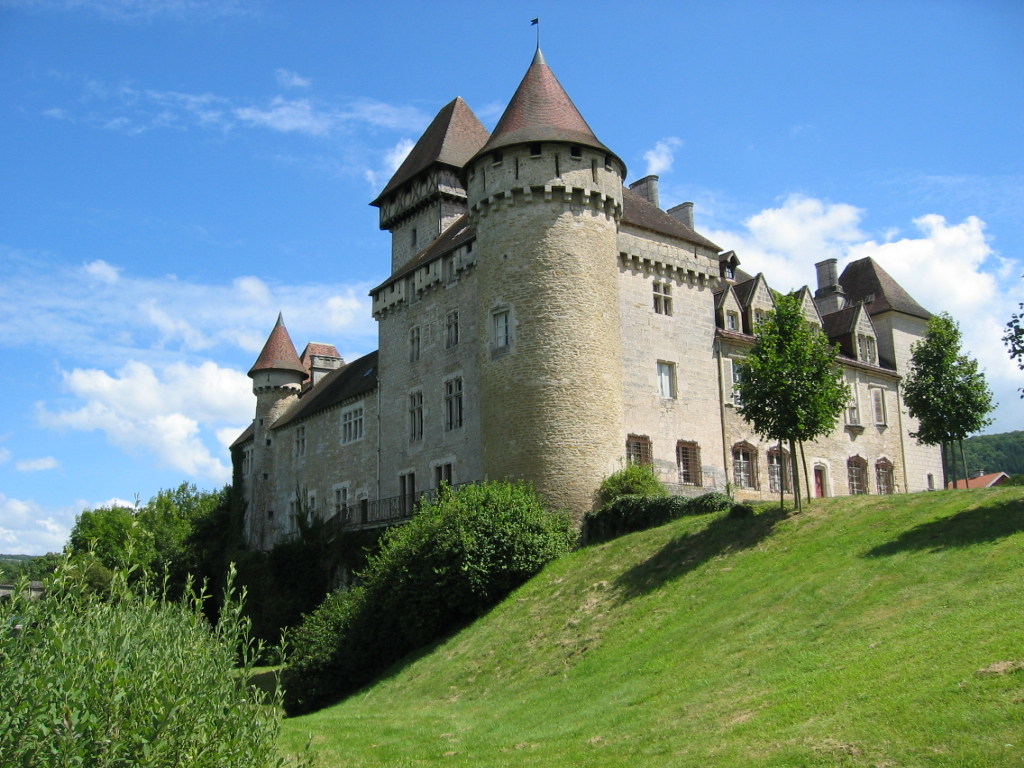
Château de Cléron

The Château de Cléron is a 14th-century castle in the commune of Cléron, 25 kilometres (16 mi) south of Besançon, in the Doubs département of France.

== History ==
Before the 12th century, the lords of Cléron succeeded the lords of Scey to control the crossing of the River Loue by a wooden bridge on the main « Route du sel » ("salt road") of Franche-Comté, the road linking Besançon to Salins-les-Bains and assuring the prosperity of the region in the Middle Ages.

The castle was built in 1320 on the bank of the Loue by Humbert de Cléron (vassal of the County of Burgundy) on the site of a former Gallo-Roman castrum.

During the Ten Years' War (1634-1644, and part of the Thirty Years' War) led by Richelieu (cardinal and prime minister of Louis XIII) to attempt the reconquest of County of Burgundy to Habsburg Spain, the village was devastated, once by Swedish mercenaries in the pay of France in 1639, then a second time by the French.

The castle was heavily remodelled in the 18th century while preserving its Middle Ages defences - keep, machicolations, arrowslits and murder-holes. It is flanked by a square tower, the Clock Tower, from the 19th century.

This perfectly restored castle is the private property of the Montrichard family. It has been listed since 1988 as a monument historique by the French Ministry of Culture.

== Tourism ==
The private gardens are open to visitors during July and August.

== Gallery ==
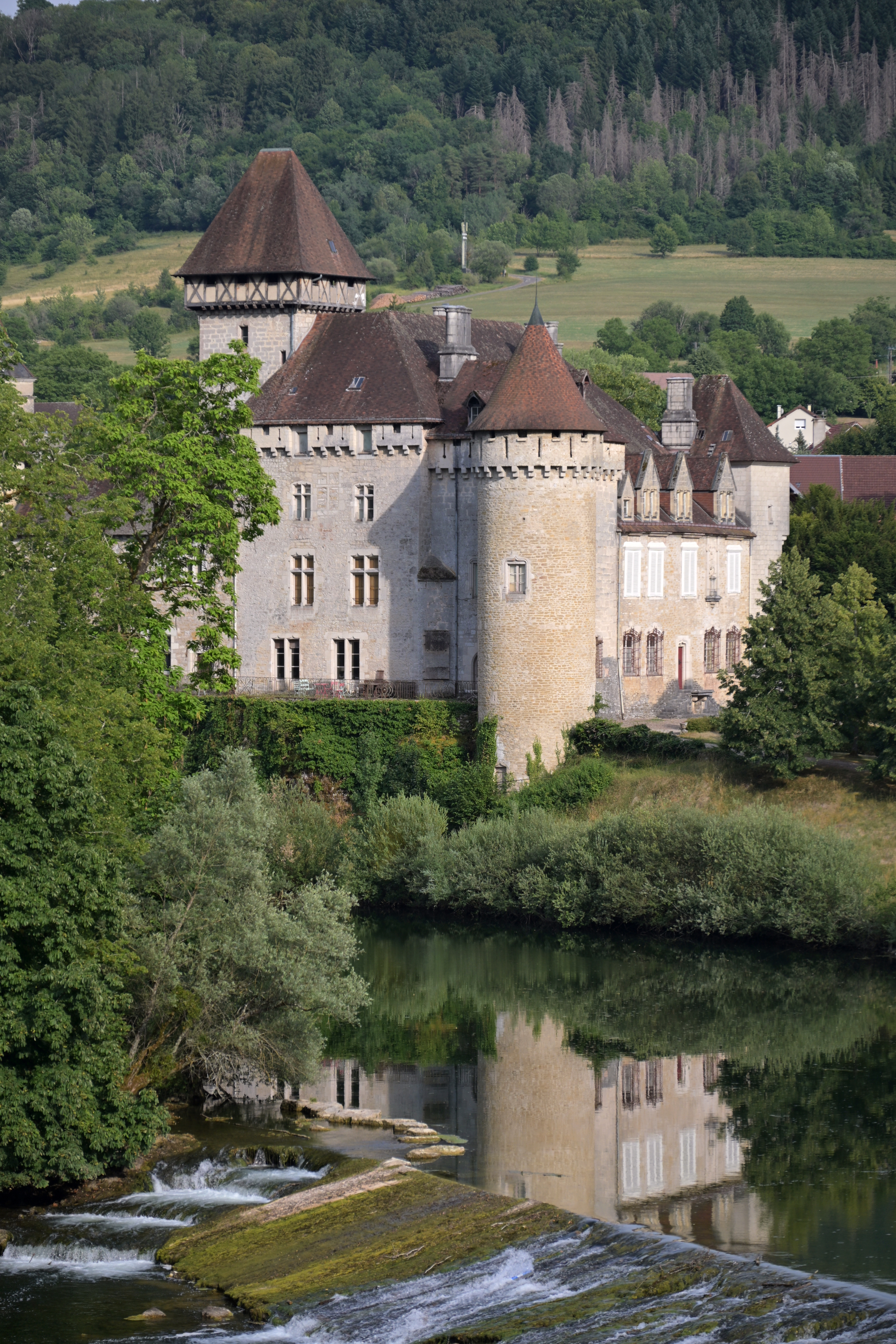

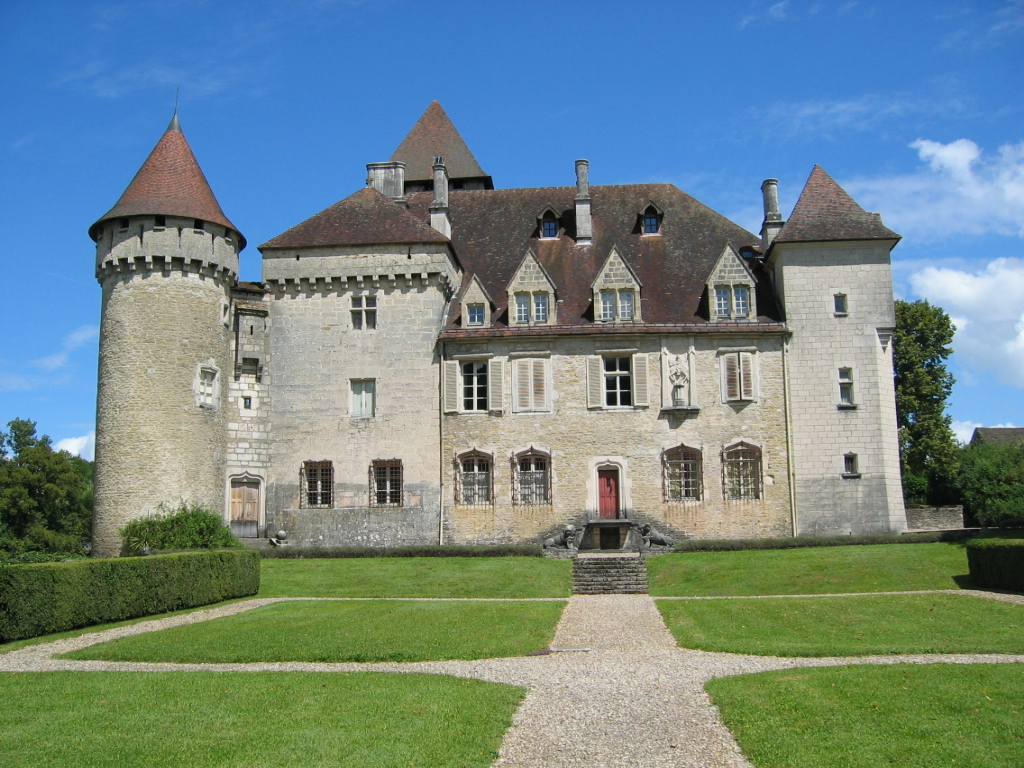

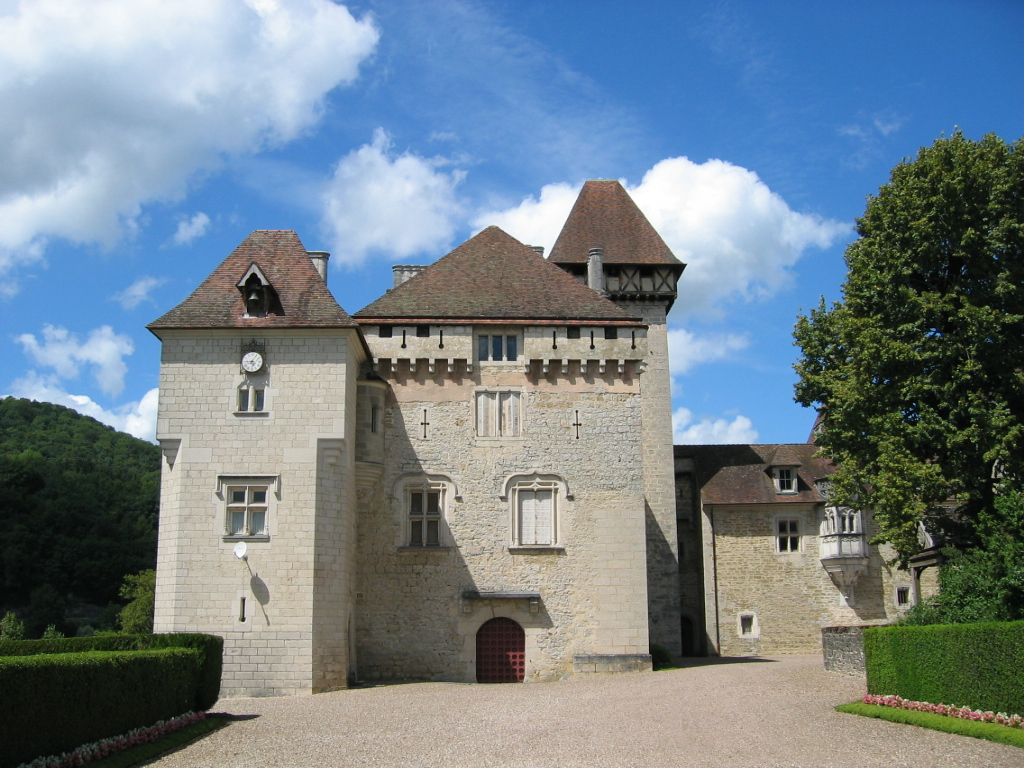

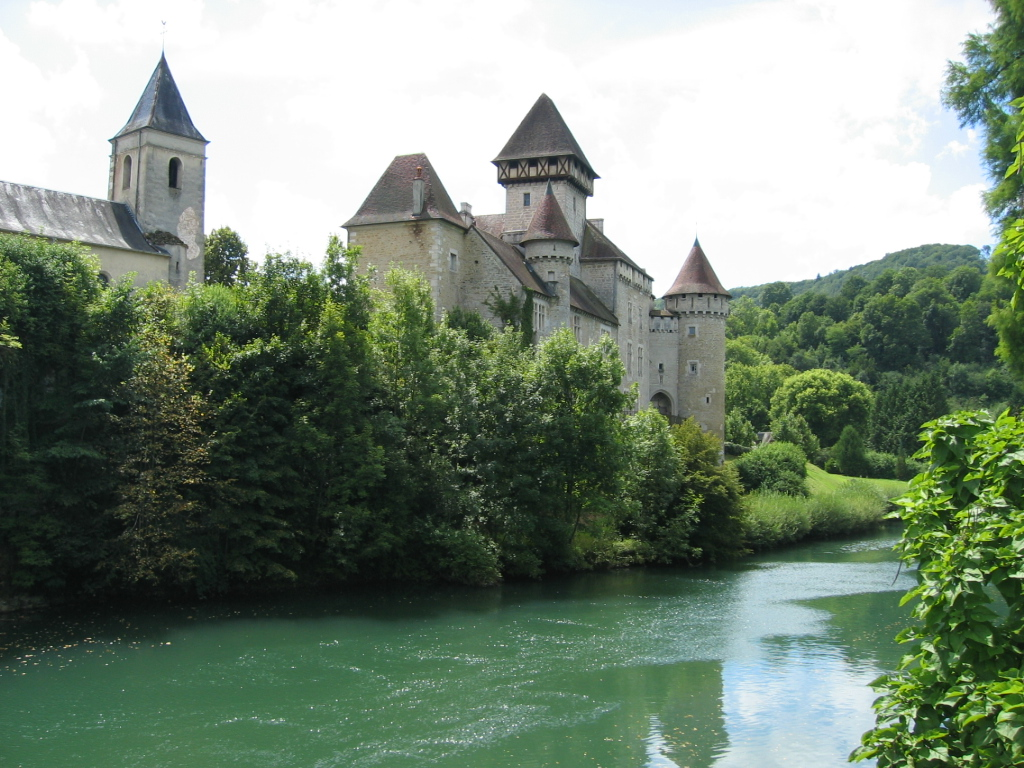

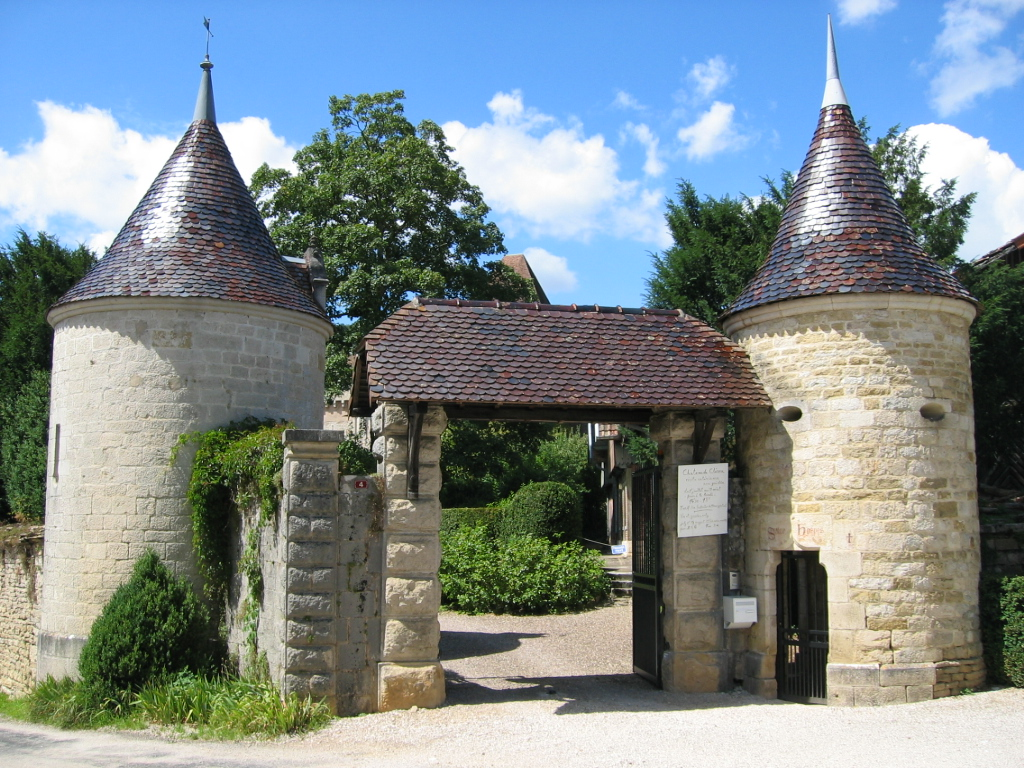

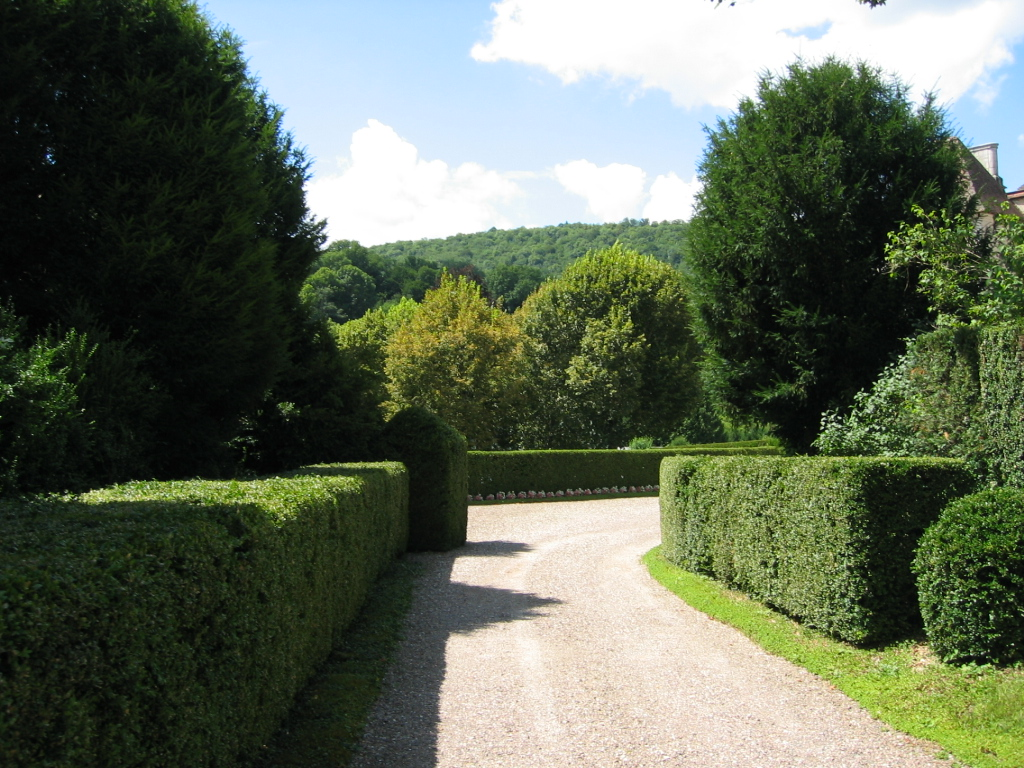

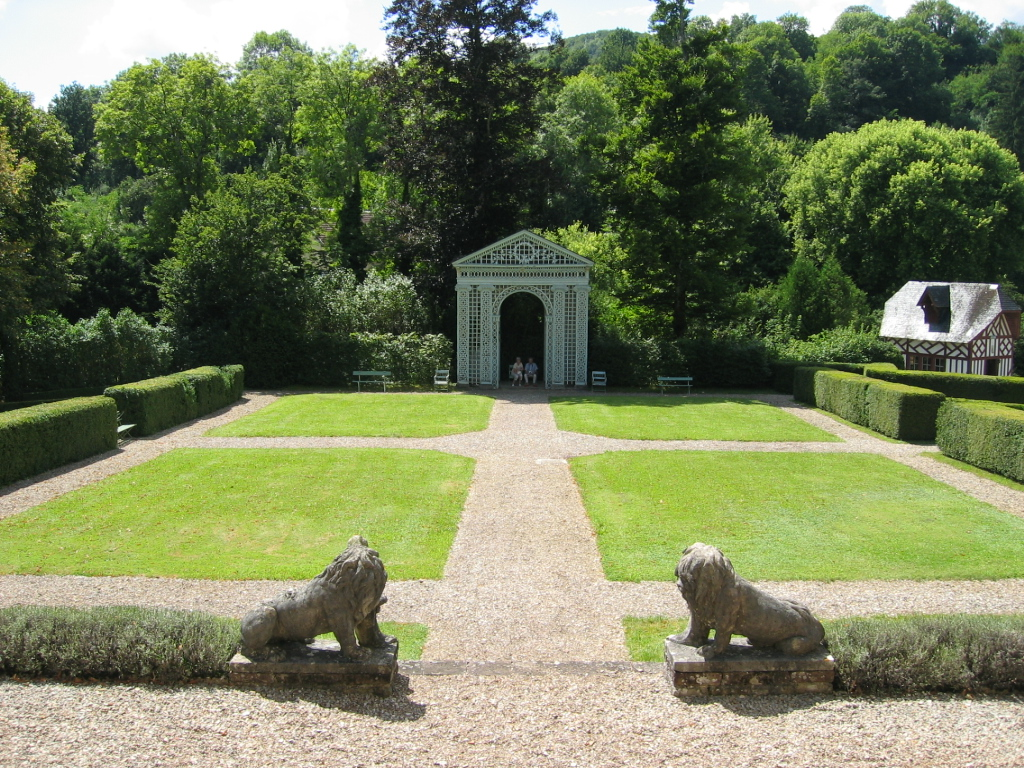

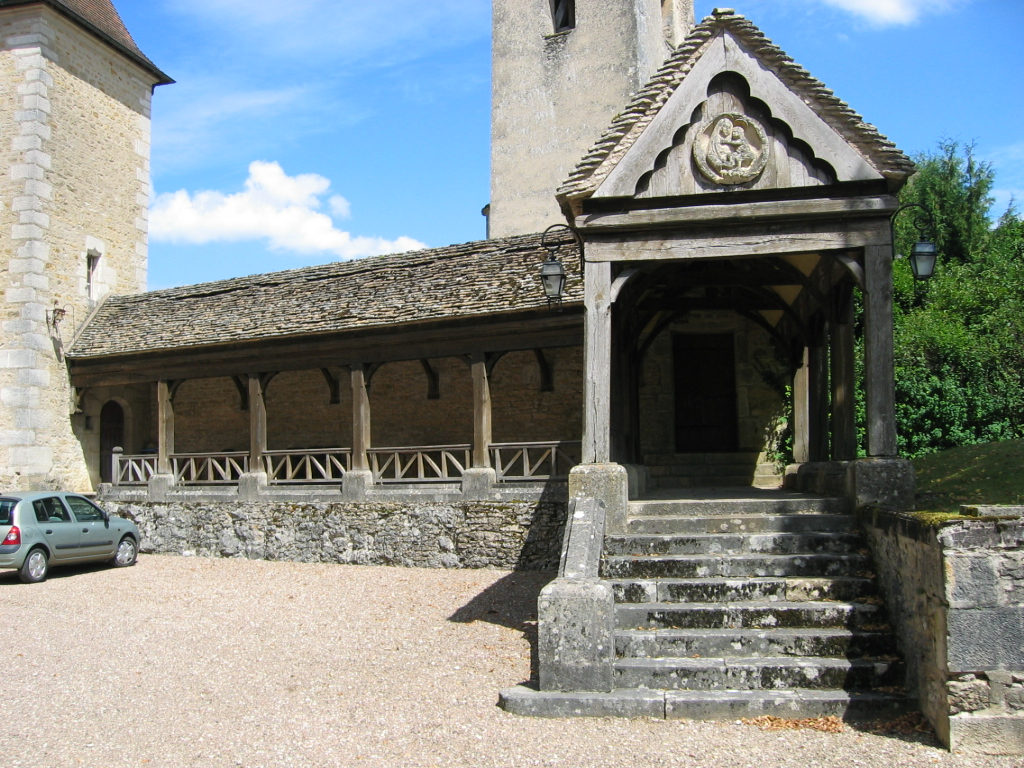

== See also ==
- List of castles in France
- List of châteaux in Franche-Comté
- List of counts of Burgundy
