= Bréry =

- Part of Domblans
- Location of Bréry
- Location within France Location within Bourgogne-Franche-Comté
- Coordinates: 46°47′05″N 5°34′46″E
- Country: France
- Region: Bourgogne-Franche-Comté
- Department: Jura
- Arrondissement: Lons-le-Saunier
- Canton: Bletterans
- Commune: Domblans
- Area^{1}: 4.85 km^{2} (1.87 sq mi)
- Highest elevation: 405 m (1,329 ft)
- Lowest elevation: 227 m (745 ft)
- Population (2023): 209
  - Density: 43.1/km^{2} (112/sq mi)
- Time zone: UTC+01:00 (CET)
  - Summer (DST): UTC+02:00 (CEST)
- Postal code: 39230
- ^{1} French Land Register data, which excludes lakes, ponds, glaciers > 1 km^{2} (0.386 sq mi or 247 acres) and river estuaries.

Bréry (French pronunciation: [bʁeʁi]) is a former commune in the Jura department in Bourgogne-Franche-Comté in eastern France. On 1 January 2019, it was merged into the commune Domblans.

== See also ==
- Communes of the Jura department
