= Château d'Oricourt =

Oricourt Castle
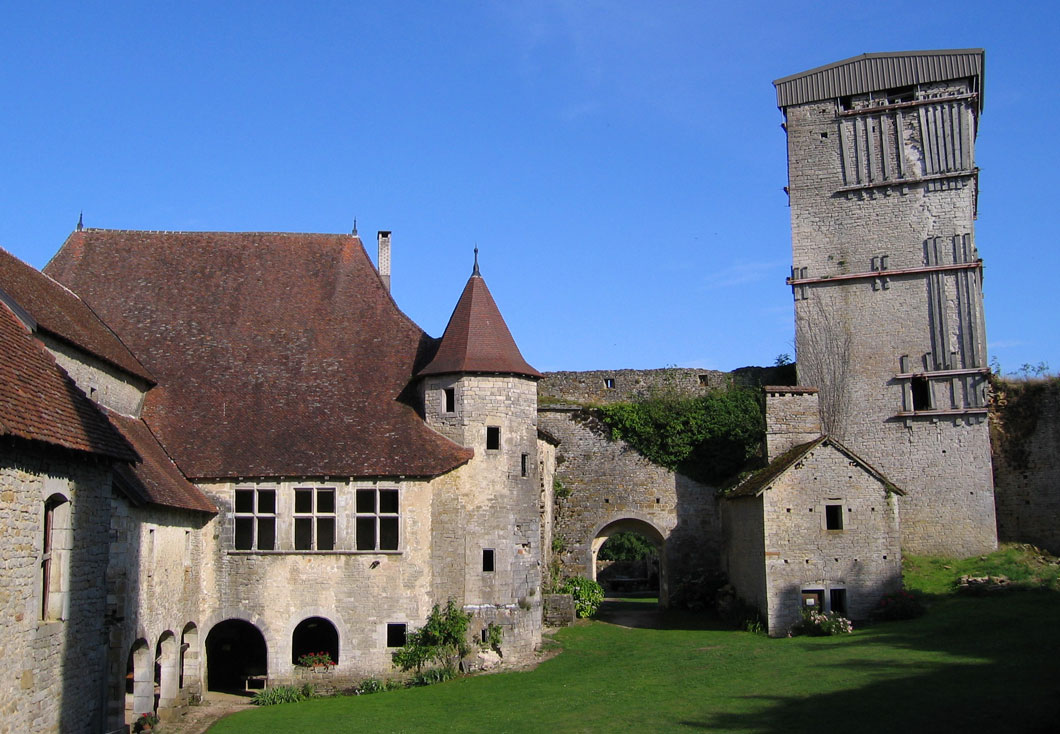
- The residential courtyard
- Interactive map of Oricourt Castle
- 47.595833°N 6.391944°E
- Type: Castle
- Location: Oricourt, France

History
- Built: 12th Century

Site notes
- Owner: Lord of Oricourt

Monument historique
- Designated: 1984
- Reference no.: PA00102236

The Château d'Oricourt is a castle in the commune of Oricourt in the department of Haute-Saône, in the Franche-Comté region of France.

The original castle on the site was a feudal motte built in wood. The present castle was built during the 12th century on the edge of a plateau, facing the Lure plain, the Château d'Oricourt is a double-walled castle. The outer wall enclosed the farm and the inner wall the residential courtyard. In the latter are a collection of buildings from the 12th and 15th centuries, including the well, a cistern, bakery, cellars and a grand dining room. Two square towers, 25m (~81 ft) high, dominate the curtain walls and deep ditches. Outside, on the village side, an imposing pigeon loft has been built.

The original owners, the Gaucher family, added "d'Oricourt" to their name. Gaucher d’Oricourt was constable to the count of Burgundy was the lord of Oricourt around 1170. Around 1250, the Vaire family occupied the castle. In 1435, during the Renaissance period, the castle came into the ownership of Nicolas Rolin, chancellor of Burgundy, who was immortalised by Van Eyck in the painting The Virgin with Chancellor Rolin (Paris, Louvre). His son, Guillaume Rolin, took possession in 1462; it was probably Guillaume who had the tasteful residence built against the north curtain. One of the windows is decorated with a mask of Nicolas Rolin.

On Guillaume's death, the castle passed to his nephew, Antoine d’Oiselay. The barons of Oiselay kept Oricourt until the middle of the 17th century, but did not live there.

After the Ten Years' War, Franche-Comté was devastated. The manor of Oricourt was put up for sale and taken by Claude François de Cordemoy in 1650. He lived here for 50 years. The last lord of Oricourt was the husband of Jeanne Claude de Cordemoy, François Gabriel, marquis of Chapuis

After the Revolution, the town of Oricourt made an unsuccessful appeal to the authorities to demolish the fortifications and fill in the ditches, symbols of feudalism.

In the 19th century the castle and its land were taken over by the Grivel family, turning it into a simple farm. The grandparents of the present owner, Jean Pierre Cornevaux, acquired the property in 1932.

Parts of the castle were protected as a monument historique on the list of the French Ministry of Culture since 1913, and in its entirety since 1984. The castle is open to the public.

== See also ==
- List of castles in France
