= Mancenans-Lizerne =

- Commune
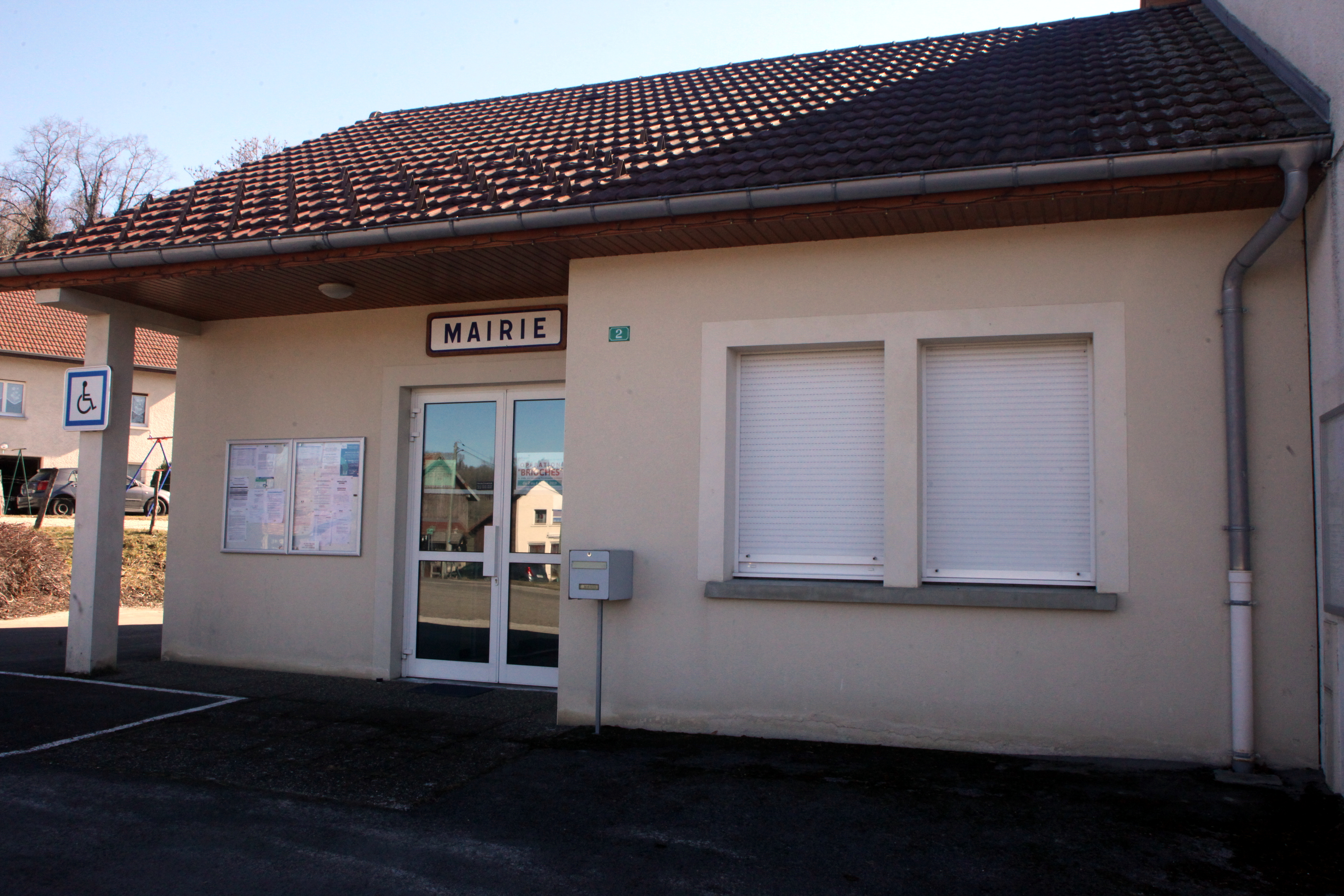
- The town hall in Mancenans-Lizerne
- Location of Mancenans-Lizerne
- Location within France Location within Bourgogne-Franche-Comté
- Coordinates: 47°15′43″N 6°46′43″E
- Country: France
- Region: Bourgogne-Franche-Comté
- Department: Doubs
- Arrondissement: Montbéliard
- Canton: Maîche

Government
  - Mayor (2020–2026): Fernande Spielmann
- Area^{1}: 6.09 km^{2} (2.35 sq mi)
- Highest elevation: 930 m (3,050 ft)
- Lowest elevation: 470 m (1,540 ft)
- Population (2023): 181
  - Density: 29.7/km^{2} (77.0/sq mi)
- Time zone: UTC+01:00 (CET)
  - Summer (DST): UTC+02:00 (CEST)
- INSEE/Postal code: 25366 /25120
- ^{1} French Land Register data, which excludes lakes, ponds, glaciers > 1 km^{2} (0.386 sq mi or 247 acres) and river estuaries.

Mancenans-Lizerne (French pronunciation: [mɑ̃snɑ̃ lizɛʁn]) is a commune in the Doubs department in the Bourgogne-Franche-Comté region in eastern France.

== Geography ==
The commune lies 3 km (1.9 mi) from Maîche.

== Population ==
Historical population
Year	Pop.	±% p.a.
1968	98	—
1975	96	−0.29%
1982	131	+4.54%
1990	131	+0.00%
1999	152	+1.67%
2007	163	+0.88%
2012	186	+2.68%
2017	192	+0.64%
2023	181	−0.98%
Source: INSEE

== See also ==
- Communes of the Doubs department
