= Château du Rosemont =

Castle in Bourgogne-Franche-Comté, France

Coordinates: 47°45′41″N 6°51′47″E

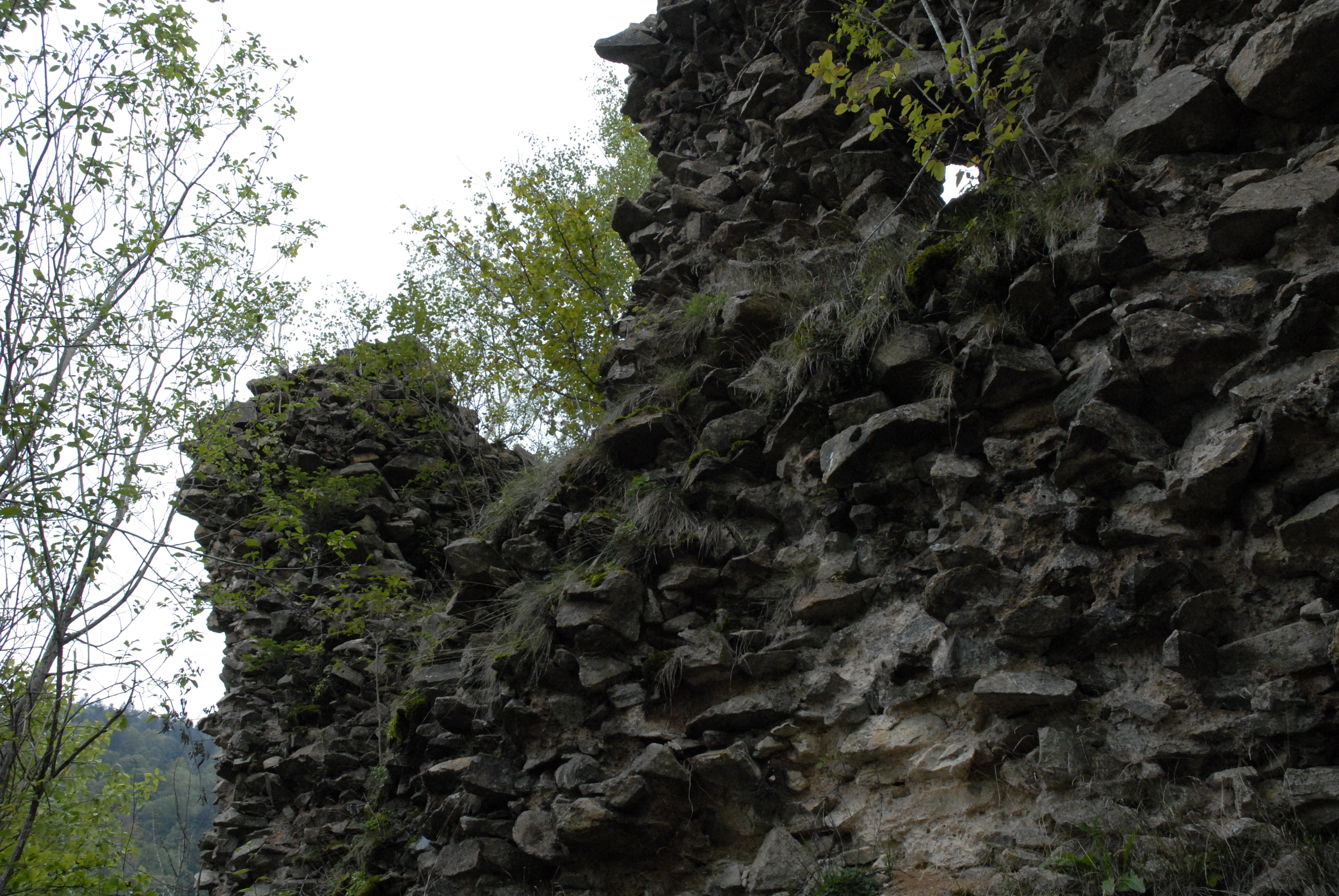
Part of the ruined tower

The Château de Rosemont is a ruined castle in the commune of Riervescemont in the Territoire de Belfort département of France. It is now a mound of stones with the remains of a tower.

== History ==
The castle was built under Louis de Mousson, Count of Montbéliard. The seigniorial court was installed there until the 14th century when it moved to Chaux. It was the property of Jeanne de Ferrette-Montbéliard in the 14th century, and then the castle passed to her eldest daughter, the wife of the Archduke of Austria. Before 1469, the fortress was abandoned and thus lost its strategic role.

It was finally destroyed by Swedish artillery bombardment in 1633, during the Thirty Years' War.

== Architecture ==
The remains comprise two parts: at the front, a square tower of two or three storeys, made in rough stones, measures 10 m on each side with walls 1.5 m thick. In the east are the remains of an outer work, and in the south is the access path.

== See also ==
- List of castles in France
