= Château de la Muyre =

Building in Domblans, France

Coordinates: 46°45′14″N 5°34′19″E

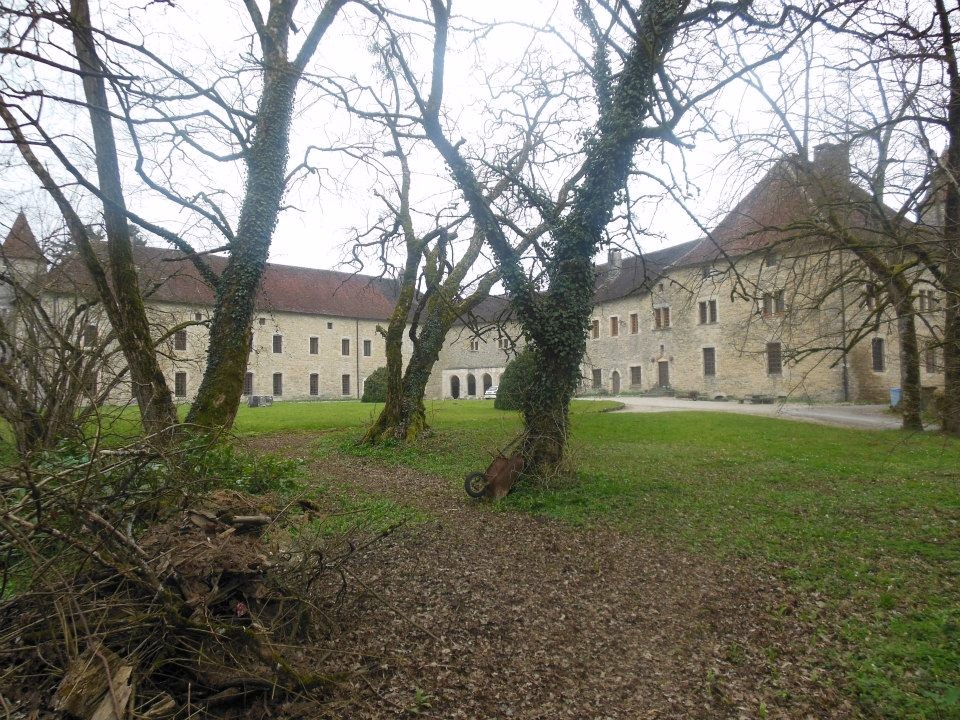
- Interactive map of the Château de la Muyre area

General information
- Location: Domblans, France

The Château de la Muyre (or la Muire) is a fortified site a few kilometres from the village centre of Domblans, in the Jura department of France.

== History ==
A first castle was built on the ruins of an earlier Gallo-Roman structure.

The present Château de la Muyre was constructed from limestone by an unknown architect at the start of the 15th century. Over the years, there have been important additional works and remodelling, in particular in the 19th century. Recycled stones bear the dates 1581 and 1616. It has been the property of the Counts of Grivel since 1624.

It has been subject to 20 years of important restoration work led by Count Claude de Grivel. A gallery from the Carthusian monastery of Vaucluse in Onoz was reassembled here in 1956.

== See also ==
- List of castles in France
