= Château de Rougemont =

Ruined 12th-century castle in Rougemont-le-Château in France

Coordinates: 47°44′52″N 6°58′00″E

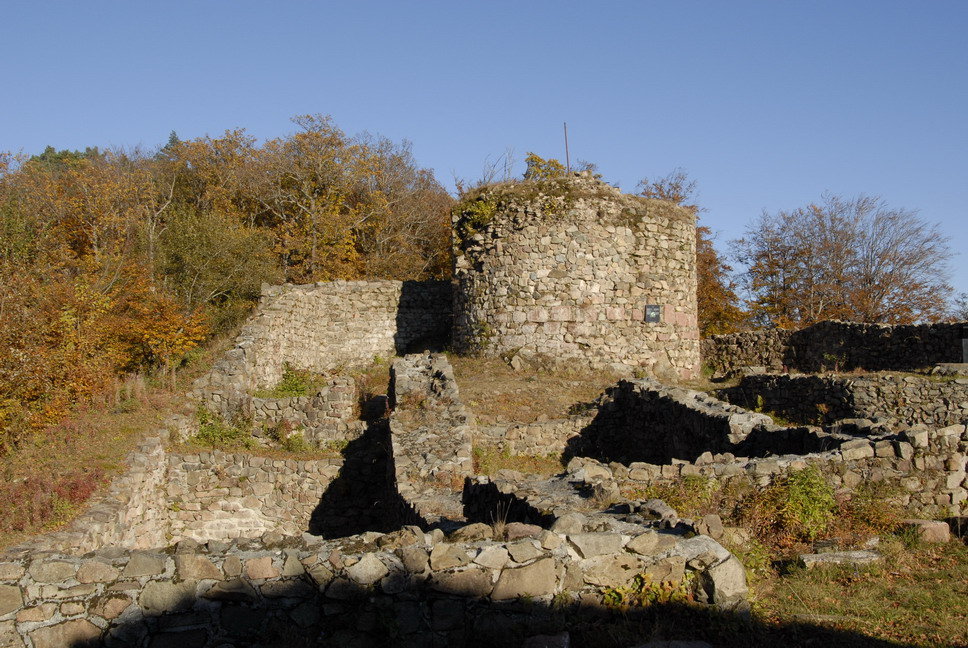

The Château de Rougemont is a ruined 12th-century castle in the commune of Rougemont-le-Château in the Territoire de Belfort département of France.

== Geography ==
The castle, a small fortress, was built on a small hill in the Vosges Mountains facing the Jura plateaux. At an altitude of 736 m, it dominated the entry to Burgundy.

== History ==
The castle belonged to the Counts of Ferrette and was built around the end of the 12th century. It protected an ancient Roman road from Langres that crosses the Vosges and passes by Rougemont. The castle watched over the southern entry to Alsace and symbolised the strength of the rulers of the region. With the extinction of the Ferrette line in 1324, the property passed to the Habsburgs.

Enguerrand VII, Lord of Coucy (and Earl of Bedford) destroyed the castle at the end of the 14th century.

Excavations began in 1977 preceding a complete restoration of the castle. The museum at Belfort preserves important military, civil and religious finds that the digs revealed. The castle is open to the public, free of charge, but access is not easy.

Since 1996 the French Ministry of Culture has listed the castle as a monument historique.

== Plan of the castle ==
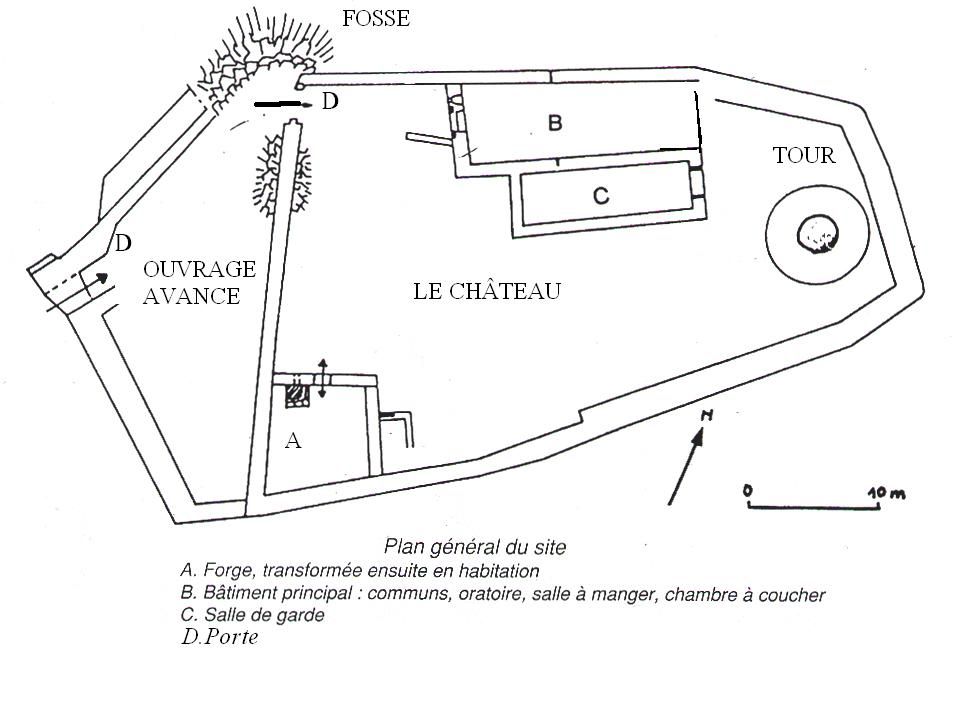

== See also ==
- List of castles in France
