= Château d'Étobon =

Coordinates: 47°38′58″N 6°40′30″E

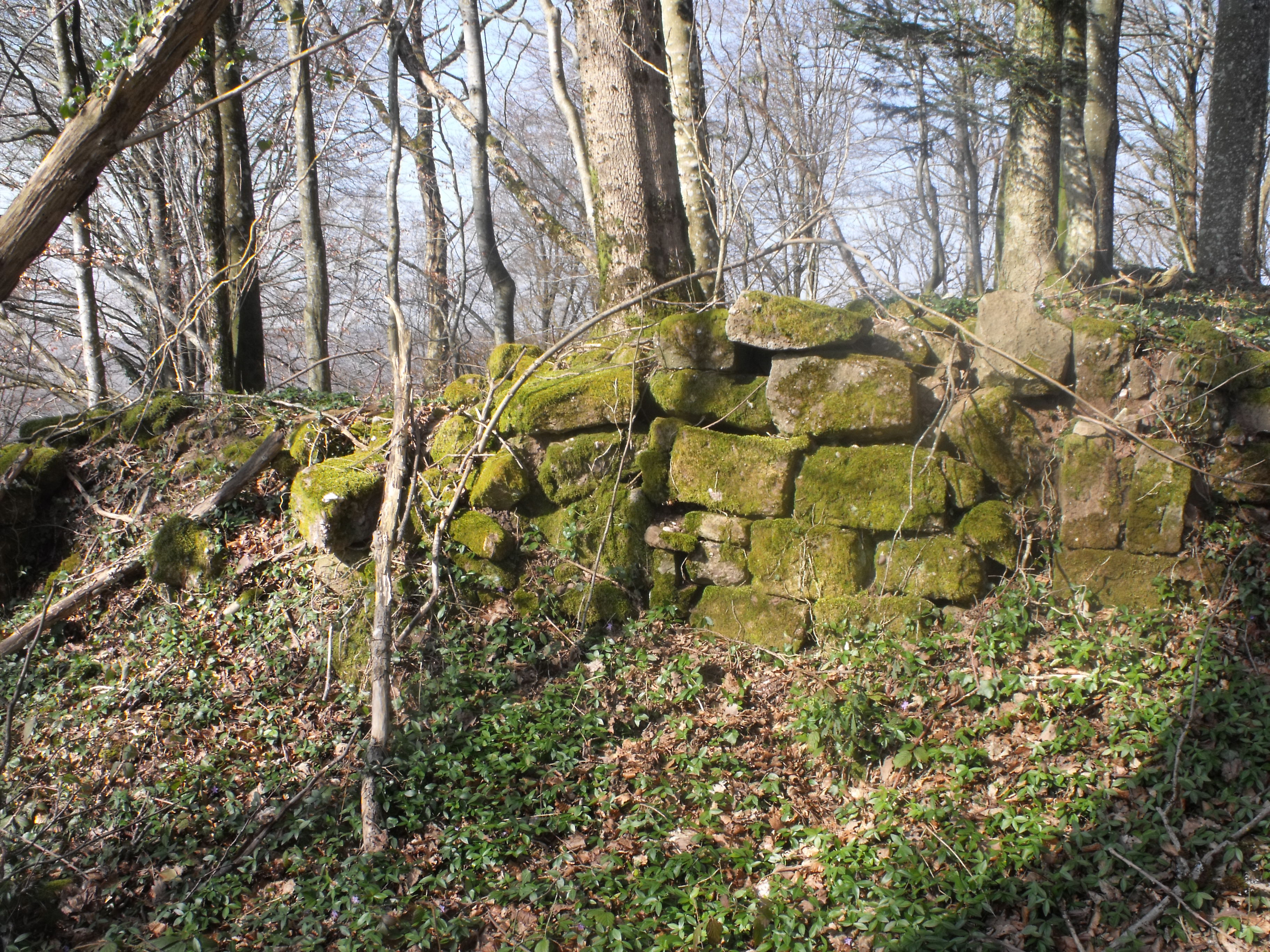
Vestige of the old Etobon castle, Haute-Saône, France

The Château d'Étobon is a ruined castle in the commune of Étobon in the Haute-Saône département of France, 6 km from the town of Héricourt.

The ruins stand on a hill dominating the village of Étobon. Its position and its considerable construction works contributed to its strength. It is 167 m above the village, and measures 220 m by 60 m.

Burned and destroyed by the Duke of Furstemberg in 1519, it fell into ruin. Ulrich, Duke of Württemberg, recovered the castle but did not believe he could repair it. From the 17th century, after the Thirty Years' War, the villagers, with the permission of the Prince of Montbéliard, removed a large quantity of its stones for the construction of houses. Their descendants continued this destruction. Today, there remain only a few traces of this ancient castle.

== See also ==
- List of castles in France
