= Cléron =

- Commune
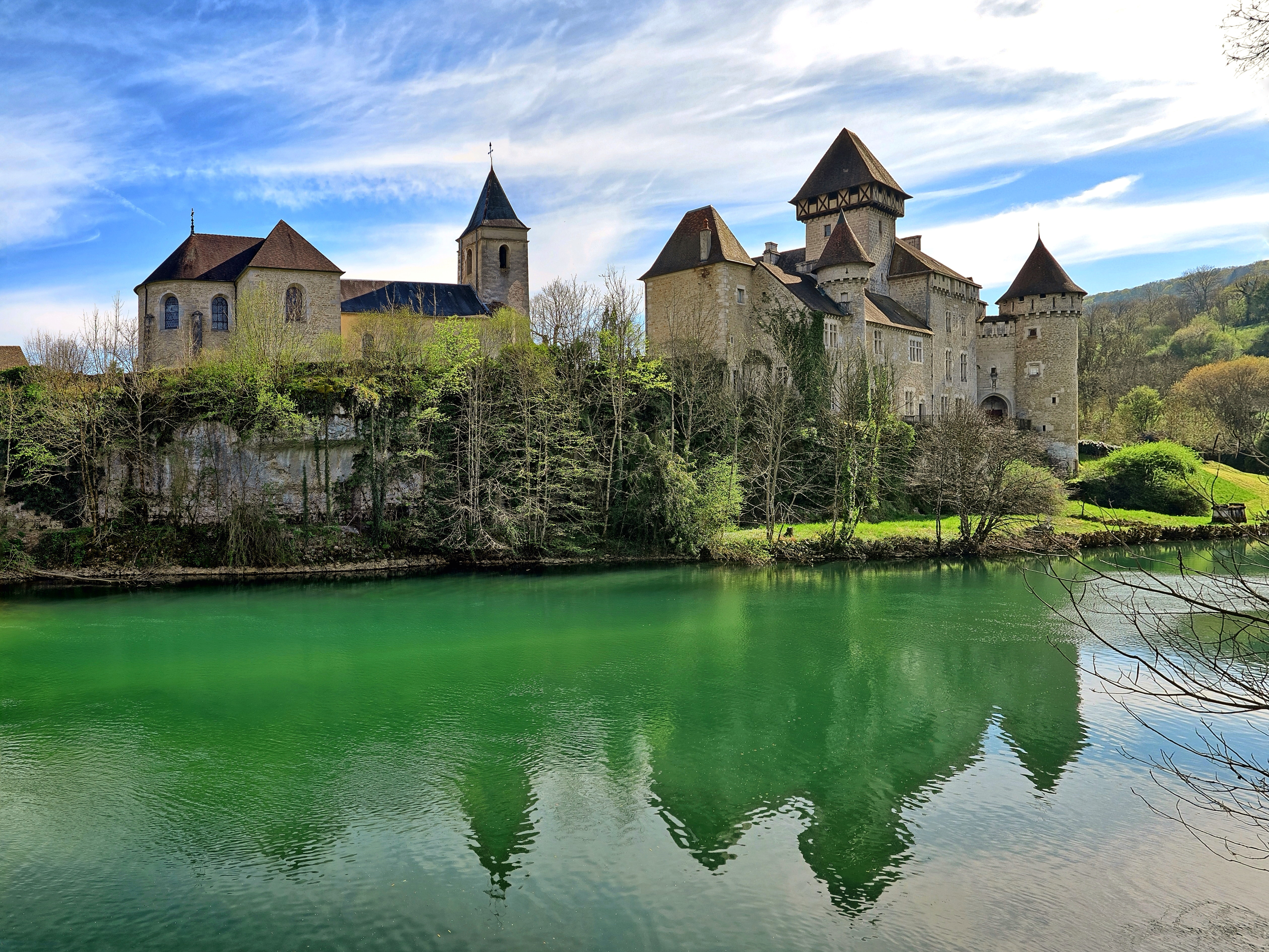
- Château de Cléron

- Coat of arms
- Location of Cléron
- Location within France Location within Bourgogne-Franche-Comté
- Coordinates: 47°05′16″N 6°03′43″E
- Country: France
- Region: Bourgogne-Franche-Comté
- Department: Doubs
- Arrondissement: Besançon
- Canton: Ornans
- Intercommunality: Loue-Lison

Government
  - Mayor (2020–2026): Jean-Marie Doney
- Area^{1}: 14.56 km^{2} (5.62 sq mi)
- Highest elevation: 563 m (1,847 ft)
- Lowest elevation: 295 m (968 ft)
- Population (2023): 289
  - Density: 19.8/km^{2} (51.4/sq mi)
- Time zone: UTC+01:00 (CET)
  - Summer (DST): UTC+02:00 (CEST)
- INSEE/Postal code: 25155 /25330
- ^{1} French Land Register data, which excludes lakes, ponds, glaciers > 1 km^{2} (0.386 sq mi or 247 acres) and river estuaries.

Cléron (French pronunciation: [kleʁɔ̃]) is a commune in the Doubs department in the Bourgogne-Franche-Comté region in eastern France.

== Population ==
Historical population
Year	Pop.	±% p.a.
1968	188	—
1975	182	−0.46%
1982	235	+3.72%
1990	266	+1.56%
1999	294	+1.12%
2007	305	+0.46%
2012	317	+0.77%
2017	309	−0.51%
2023	289	−1.11%
Source: INSEE

== Sights ==
- The Château de Cléron is a 14th-century castle, remodelled over the years. Its privately owned and not open to visitors, though the gardens are opened during the summer. It has been listed since 1988 as a historic site by the French Ministry of Culture.

== See also ==
- Communes of the Doubs department
