= Château de Montbéliard =

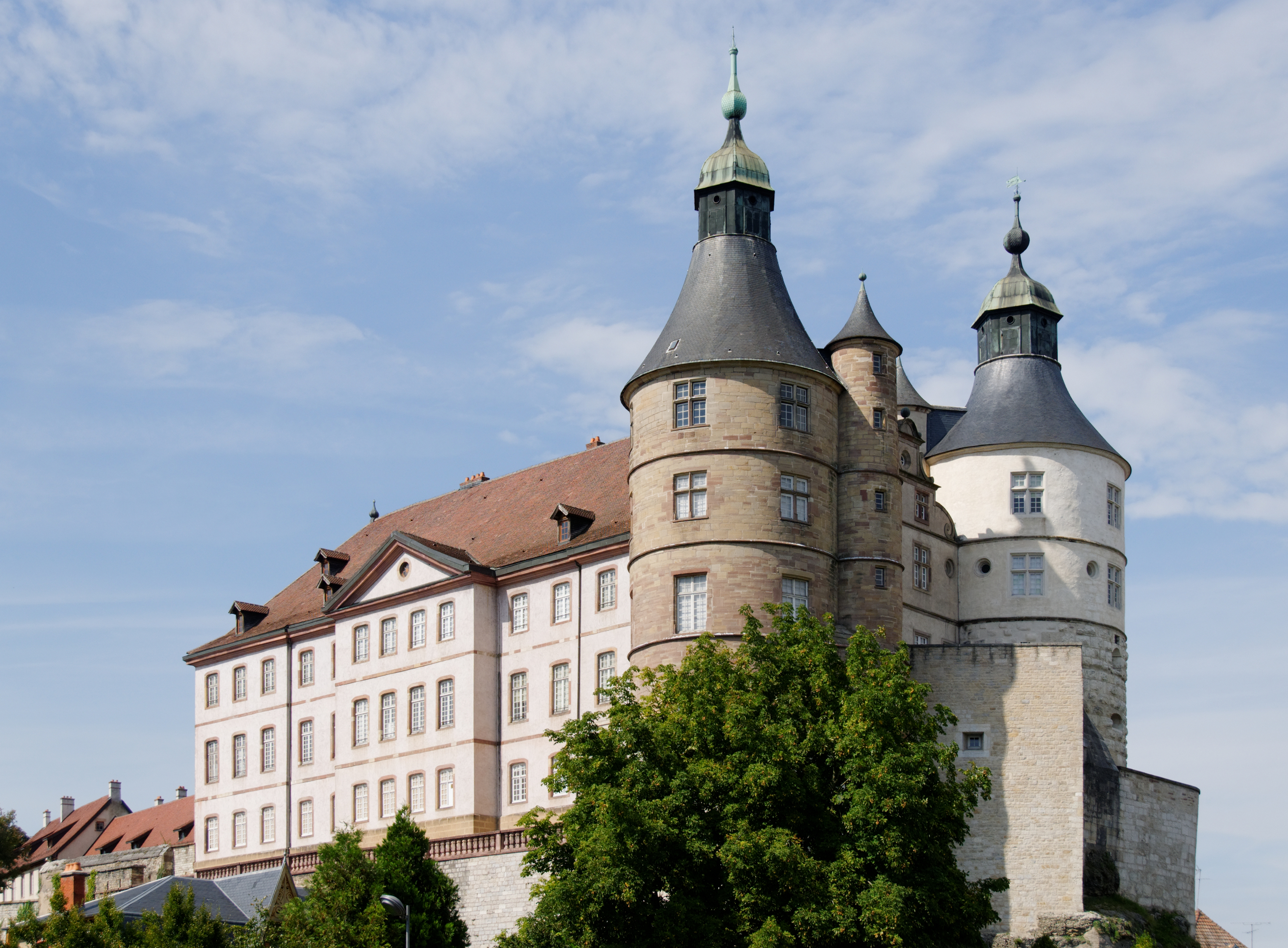
- The Château de Montbéliard

- Location within France
- 47°30′34″N 6°48′04″E

History
- Built: 13th century and 19th century
- Built for: Montfaucon family
- Original use: Castle

Site notes
- Current use: Museum
- Owner: Municipalité de Montbéliard

Monument historique
- Designated: 1996

The Château de Montbéliard (Montbeliard Castle), also known as the Château des ducs de Württemberg (Castle of the Dukes of Württemberg) is a fortress located on an outcropping rock that overlooks the town of Montbéliard in the Doubs département of France. Since 1996, it has been classified as a monument historique by the French Ministry of Culture. The property of the commune, it is open to the public.

== History ==
It is believed that there has been a fortress on the site since the Gallo-Roman times, though then it was only a wooden watchtower acting as an observation post for the defence of the town of Mandeure (Epomanduodurum).

Until 1397, the castle belonged to the Montfaucon family. The marriage of Henriette d'Orbe to Eberhard IV, son of the count Eberhard III of Württemberg, transferred the ownership of the castle to the Württemberg family. It was the home of Sophia Dorothea of Brandenburg-Schwedt, mother of Empress Maria Feodorovna of Russia.

In 1793, the castle became part of Revolutionary France. It served as a garrison until 1933, when it was transformed into a history museum.

== Architecture ==
The castle was once divided into two parts around the ancient Church of Saint-Maimbœuf that dominated the esplanade of the castle with its high belltower.

The Châtel-Derrière (back of the castle), in the east, had two imposing towers dating from time immemorial. It contained the reception and the private apartments of the counts and dukes who followed one another, first in the county and then in the principality. This part of the castle was separated by a wide and deep ditch (which does not exist today), spanned by a drawbridge.

The Châtel-Devant (front of the castle), in the west, dominates the town of Allan and the river Lizaine (before it channels underground), and contains along its northern face the single entry of the fortress, together with its drawbridge and portcullis. The drawbridge spanned a ditch that was added for the protection of the entrance; this ditch was filled in during the great transformations of the 18th century that modified aspects of the castle. Châtel-Devant contained in its enclosure the buildings of the garrison (which sometimes also housed official travelers), the stables, the falconry, and the arsenal which stored the guns, ammunition and weapons necessary for the defence of the castle and the city. The imposing mass of the Hôtel du Baili (the bailiff's lodging) always dominated this part of the castle. One can still make out the building of the chancellery that was located immediately past the entrance of the castle.

It is said that the castle was in a state of advanced decay at the end of the 18th century. Several buildings were demolished and rebuilt during the 18th and 19th centuries. Two prominent 19th-century transformations were: the demolition of the Église Saint-Maimbœuf in 1810; and the destruction of the house called "entre les tours" (between the towers), which was a building flanked by the Henriette and Frederique towers characterising Châtel-Derrière that gives the castle its imposing aspect. This house was replaced by a facade decorated with spires in the Germanic style of the 17th century.

== See also ==
- Montbéliard
- List of castles in France

== Bibliography ==
- Daniel Seigneur. Le Roman d'une Principauté. Cétre-Besançon.
