= Hauteroche, Jura =

Commune in Bourgogne-Franche-Comté, France

Hauteroche
- Commune
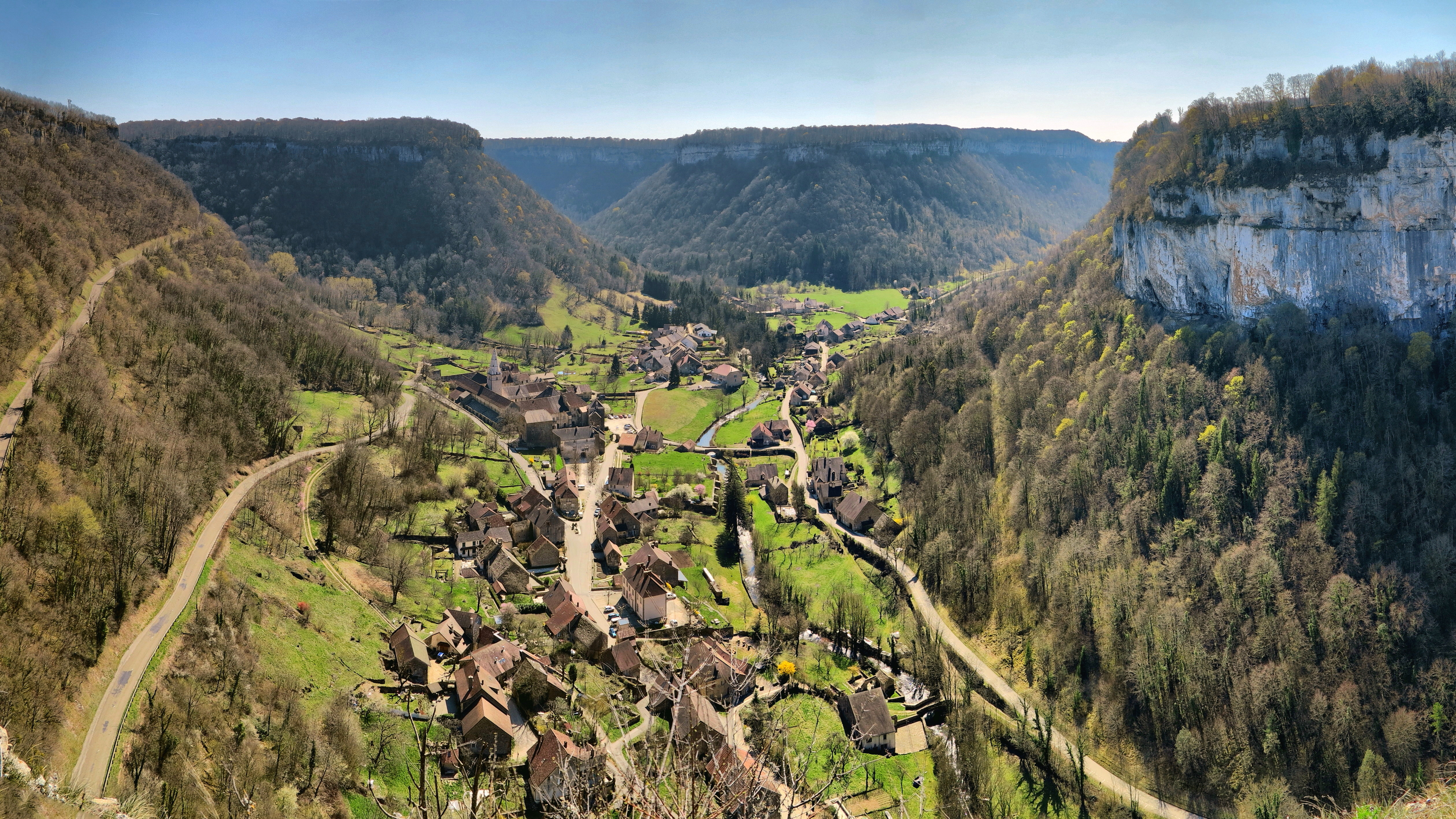
- A general view of the village of Baume-les-Messieurs
- Location of Hauteroche
- Location within France Location within Bourgogne-Franche-Comté
- Coordinates: 46°41′10″N 5°39′36″E
- Country: France
- Region: Bourgogne-Franche-Comté
- Department: Jura
- Arrondissement: Lons-le-Saunier
- Canton: Poligny

Government
  - Mayor (2020–2026): Daniel Segut
- Area^{1}: 38.93 km^{2} (15.03 sq mi)
- Population (2023): 971
  - Density: 24.9/km^{2} (64.6/sq mi)
- Time zone: UTC+01:00 (CET)
  - Summer (DST): UTC+02:00 (CEST)
- INSEE/Postal code: 39177 /39570, 39210
- ^{1} French Land Register data, which excludes lakes, ponds, glaciers > 1 km^{2} (0.386 sq mi or 247 acres) and river estuaries.

Hauteroche (French pronunciation: [otʁɔʃ]) is a commune in the Jura department of eastern France. The municipality was established on 1 January 2016 and consists of the former communes of Crançot, Granges-sur-Baume and Mirebel.

== See also ==
- Communes of the Jura department
