= Château de Montferrand =

Medieval castle in Hérault, France

- Saint-Mathieu-de-Tréviers, Hérault, France

Site information
- Type: Castle (ruined)
- Owner: Communauté de communes du Grand Pic Saint-Loup
- Open to the public: No (closed since 2018)
- Condition: Ruined

Location
- Coordinates: 43.7753°N 3.8400°E

Site history
- Built: 12th century
- Materials: Limestone

The Château de Montferrand is a ruined medieval castle in the commune of Saint-Mathieu-de-Tréviers, in the Hérault department of southern France. It stands on a limestone spur on the eastern ridge of the Pic Saint-Loup, above the village. First documented in the early 12th century, it was a seat of the Counts of Melgueil and later belonged to the bishops of Maguelone. It has been classified as a monument historique since 2024.

== History ==
The oldest visible remains date to the 11th century, when a castrum was built on an earlier fortified site under Count Pierre de Mauguio. In 1132, the castle is recorded as a possession of the Counts of Melgueil, whose county was divided into two districts, Melgueil (later Mauguio) and Montferrand.

During the Albigensian Crusade, the castle was confiscated from Raymond VI, Count of Toulouse, and in 1215 placed by the pope under the bishop of Maguelone, who thereby held both spiritual and temporal authority over the county. In 1574 it was taken by Protestant forces during the French Wars of Religion, and recovered for the Catholic side by Antoine de Cambous in 1584. The bishop Pierre de Fenouillet reinforced its defences against artillery in 1611.

The castle was no longer maintained after the mid-17th century. Under Louis XIV, permission was granted to dismantle it, and demolition began in 1709, though transport difficulties left much of the structure standing as ruins.

== Conservation and protection ==
The castle occupies roughly 7,000 square metres along the ridge, with 17th-century texts distinguishing a "vieux Montferrand" and a "petit Montferrand". The Communauté de communes du Grand Pic Saint-Loup acquired the site in 2009 and began a conservation programme in 2017; it has been closed to the public since 2018 for safety reasons. Since 2018 the ruins have been the subject of an architectural and archaeological survey directed by the architect Thomas Robardet-Caffin, whose 2021 doctoral thesis at the Paul Valéry University covers the castle and other fortifications of the Pic Saint-Loup.

The castle was registered as a monument historique on 15 June 2022, and classified, the higher level of protection, by decree of 25 March 2024. It was the eighth classified monument within the Grand Pic Saint-Loup area. Work to stabilise the ruins was planned to begin in 2025, ahead of archaeological excavation and a phased restoration. In 2025 the castle was among the sites selected for the national heritage lottery (Loto du patrimoine), receiving €200,000 towards securing the ruins.
