= Hauteroche Castle =

Castle in Wallonia, Belgium

- Wallonia, Belgium
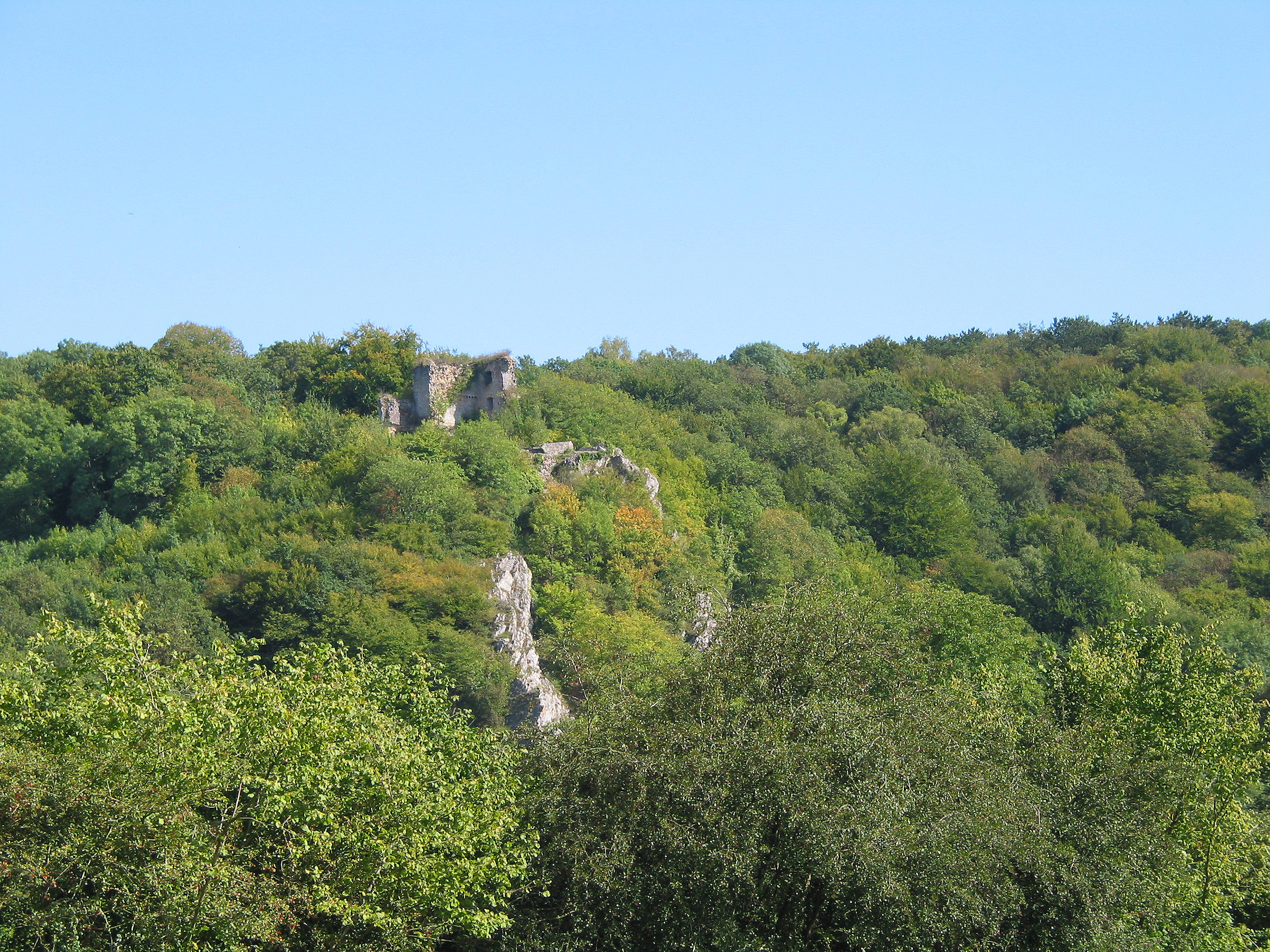
- Castle ruins

Site information
- Type: Castle
- Condition: Ruined

Location
- Coordinates: 50.0875°N 4.5994°E

Hauteroche Castle (French: Château de Hauteroche) is a ruined 14th-century castle, destroyed after a siege in 1554, in the village of Dourbes in the municipality of Viroinval, province of Namur, Wallonia, Belgium.

The castle site was scientifically excavated between 1976 and 2002.

== See also ==
- List of castles in Belgium

== Sources ==
- Archeostage.com: reports of archaeological excavations of the castle site (in French)
