= Riervescemont =

- Commune
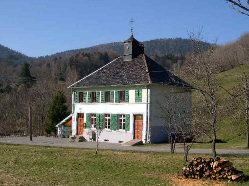
- Town hall

- Coat of arms
- Location of Riervescemont
- Location within France Location within Bourgogne-Franche-Comté
- Coordinates: 47°45′55″N 6°52′52″E
- Country: France
- Region: Bourgogne-Franche-Comté
- Department: Territoire de Belfort
- Arrondissement: Belfort
- Canton: Giromagny
- Intercommunality: CC Vosges du Sud

Government
  - Mayor (2020–2026): Fabien Canal
- Area^{1}: 8.52 km^{2} (3.29 sq mi)
- Highest elevation: 1,091 m (3,579 ft)
- Lowest elevation: 516 m (1,693 ft)
- Population (2023): 83
  - Density: 9.7/km^{2} (25/sq mi)
- Time zone: UTC+01:00 (CET)
  - Summer (DST): UTC+02:00 (CEST)
- INSEE/Postal code: 90085 /90200
- ^{1} French Land Register data, which excludes lakes, ponds, glaciers > 1 km^{2} (0.386 sq mi or 247 acres) and river estuaries.

Riervescemont is a commune in the Territoire de Belfort department in Bourgogne-Franche-Comté in northeastern France.

== Sights and monuments ==
- Château du Rosemont, ruined castle.

== See also ==
- Communes of the Territoire de Belfort department
