= Oricourt =

- Commune
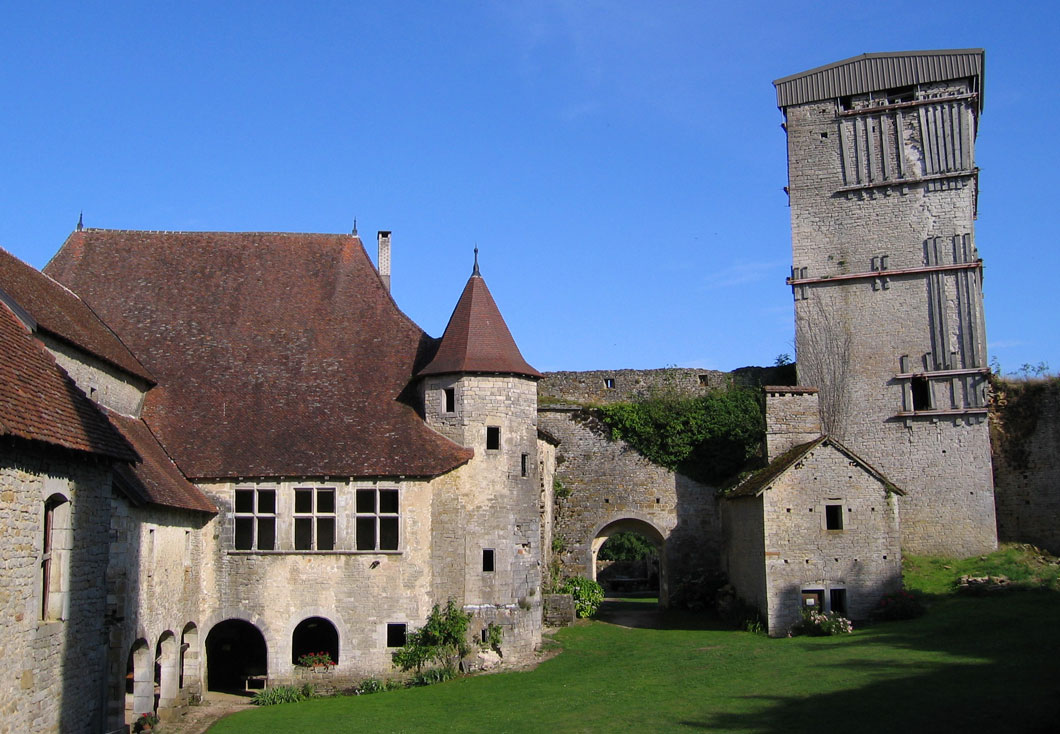
- The chateau in Oricourt
- Location of Oricourt
- Location within France Location within Bourgogne-Franche-Comté
- Coordinates: 47°35′46″N 6°23′37″E
- Country: France
- Region: Bourgogne-Franche-Comté
- Department: Haute-Saône
- Arrondissement: Lure
- Canton: Villersexel

Government
  - Mayor (2020–2026): Séverine Courvoisier
- Area^{1}: 3.65 km^{2} (1.41 sq mi)
- Highest elevation: 393 m (1,289 ft)
- Lowest elevation: 278 m (912 ft)
- Population (2023): 31
  - Density: 8.5/km^{2} (22/sq mi)
- Time zone: UTC+01:00 (CET)
  - Summer (DST): UTC+02:00 (CEST)
- INSEE/Postal code: 70396 /70110
- ^{1} French Land Register data, which excludes lakes, ponds, glaciers > 1 km^{2} (0.386 sq mi or 247 acres) and river estuaries.

Oricourt (French pronunciation: [ɔʁikuʁ]) is a commune in the Haute-Saône department in the region of Bourgogne-Franche-Comté in eastern France.

== See also ==
- Communes of the Haute-Saône department
