= Mutigney =

Commune in Bourgogne-Franche-Comté, France

- Commune
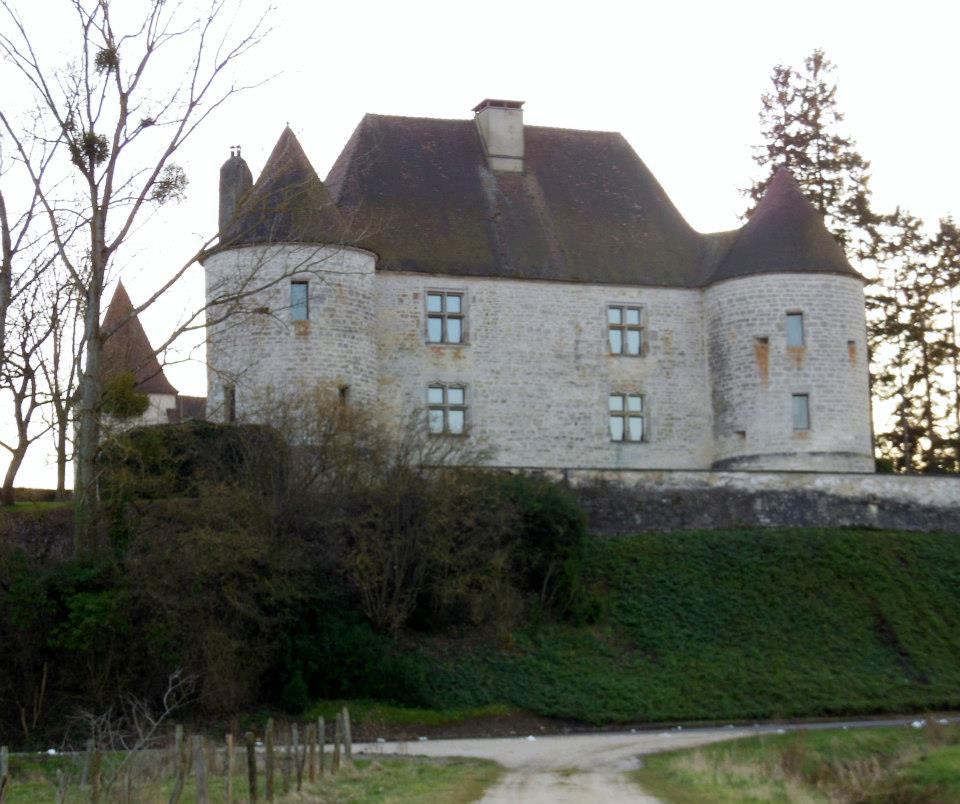
- Chateau
- Location of Mutigney
- Location within France Location within Bourgogne-Franche-Comté
- Coordinates: 47°16′44″N 5°32′40″E
- Country: France
- Region: Bourgogne-Franche-Comté
- Department: Jura
- Arrondissement: Dole
- Canton: Authume

Government
  - Mayor (2020–2026): Éric Druot
- Area^{1}: 8.00 km^{2} (3.09 sq mi)
- Highest elevation: 233 m (764 ft)
- Lowest elevation: 188 m (617 ft)
- Population (2023): 176
  - Density: 22.0/km^{2} (57.0/sq mi)
- Time zone: UTC+01:00 (CET)
  - Summer (DST): UTC+02:00 (CEST)
- INSEE/Postal code: 39377 /39290
- ^{1} French Land Register data, which excludes lakes, ponds, glaciers > 1 km^{2} (0.386 sq mi or 247 acres) and river estuaries.

Mutigney (French pronunciation: [mytiɲɛ]) is a commune in the Jura department in Bourgogne-Franche-Comté in eastern France.

== Population ==
Historical population
Year	Pop.	±% p.a.
1968	191	—
1975	175	−1.24%
1982	169	−0.50%
1990	161	−0.60%
1999	143	−1.31%
2007	146	+0.26%
2012	166	+2.60%
2017	171	+0.60%
2023	176	+0.48%
Source: INSEE

== See also ==
- Communes of the Jura department
