= Mirebel =

- Part of Hauteroche
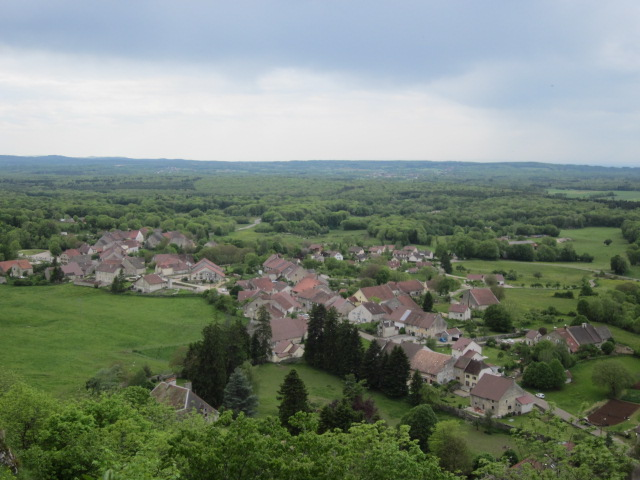
- Location of Mirebel
- Location within France Location within Bourgogne-Franche-Comté
- Coordinates: 46°41′56″N 5°43′43″E
- Country: France
- Region: Bourgogne-Franche-Comté
- Department: Jura
- Arrondissement: Lons-le-Saunier
- Canton: Poligny
- Commune: Hauteroche
- Area^{1}: 16.63 km^{2} (6.42 sq mi)
- Highest elevation: 747 m (2,451 ft)
- Lowest elevation: 460 m (1,510 ft)
- Population (2018): 234
  - Density: 14.1/km^{2} (36.4/sq mi)
- Time zone: UTC+01:00 (CET)
  - Summer (DST): UTC+02:00 (CEST)
- Postal code: 39570
- ^{1} French Land Register data, which excludes lakes, ponds, glaciers > 1 km^{2} (0.386 sq mi or 247 acres) and river estuaries.

Mirebel (French pronunciation: [miʁbɛl]; Arpitan: Merbiâ) is a former commune in the Jura department in Bourgogne-Franche-Comté in eastern France. On 1 January 2016, it was merged into the new commune of Hauteroche.

== Population ==
Historical population

Year	Pop.	±% p.a.
1793	572	—
1821	614	+0.25%
1846	628	+0.09%
1872	528	−0.66%
1901	436	−0.66%
1926	337	−1.02%
1946	287	−0.80%

Year	Pop.	±% p.a.
1962	281	−0.13%
1968	224	−3.71%
1975	197	−1.82%
1982	193	−0.29%
1990	185	−0.53%
1999	202	+0.98%
2018	234	+0.78%

Source: EHESS and INSEE

== See also ==
- Communes of the Jura department
