= Domblans =

Commune in Bourgogne-Franche-Comté, France

- Commune
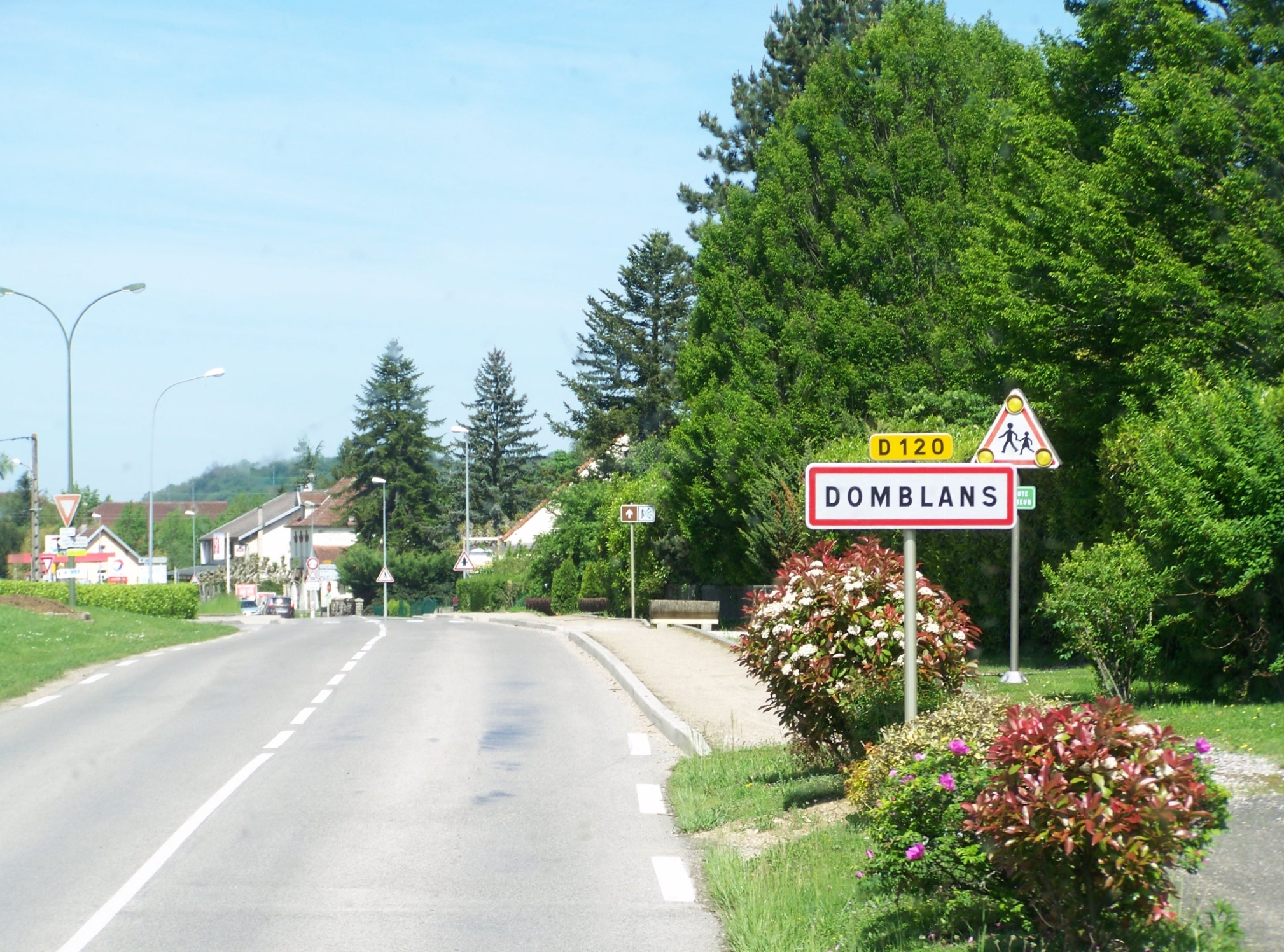
- The road into Domblans

- Coat of arms
- Location of Domblans
- Location within France Location within Bourgogne-Franche-Comté
- Coordinates: 46°45′53″N 5°35′53″E
- Country: France
- Region: Bourgogne-Franche-Comté
- Department: Jura
- Arrondissement: Lons-le-Saunier
- Canton: Poligny

Government
  - Mayor (2020–2026): Jérôme Tournier
- Area^{1}: 14.86 km^{2} (5.74 sq mi)
- Highest elevation: 405 m (1,329 ft)
- Lowest elevation: 227 m (745 ft)
- Population (2023): 1,186
  - Density: 79.81/km^{2} (206.7/sq mi)
- Time zone: UTC+01:00 (CET)
  - Summer (DST): UTC+02:00 (CEST)
- INSEE/Postal code: 39199 /39210
- ^{1} French Land Register data, which excludes lakes, ponds, glaciers > 1 km^{2} (0.386 sq mi or 247 acres) and river estuaries.

Domblans (French pronunciation: [dɔ̃blɑ̃]) is a commune in the Jura department in Bourgogne-Franche-Comté in eastern France. On 1 January 2019, the former commune Bréry was merged into Domblans.

== Population ==
Historical population
| Year | Pop. | ±% p.a. |
|---|---|---|
| 1968 | 677 | — |
| 1975 | 760 | +1.67% |
| 1982 | 879 | +2.10% |
| 1990 | 941 | +0.86% |
| 1999 | 1,031 | +1.02% |
| 2007 | 1,147 | +1.34% |
| 2012 | 1,127 | −0.35% |
| 2017 | 1,232 | +1.80% |
| 2023 | 1,186 | −0.63% |
Source: INSEE

Population data refer to the area corresponding with the commune as of January 2025.

== Sights ==
- Château de la Muyre, castle originating from the 15th century.
- Château de Domblans, a maison forte of the 12th or 13th century, remodeled as a castle in the early 13th or 14th century, and rebuilt starting in 1446 after the damage it had suffered during the Hundred Years' War.

== See also ==
- Communes of the Jura department
