= Maîche =

- Commune
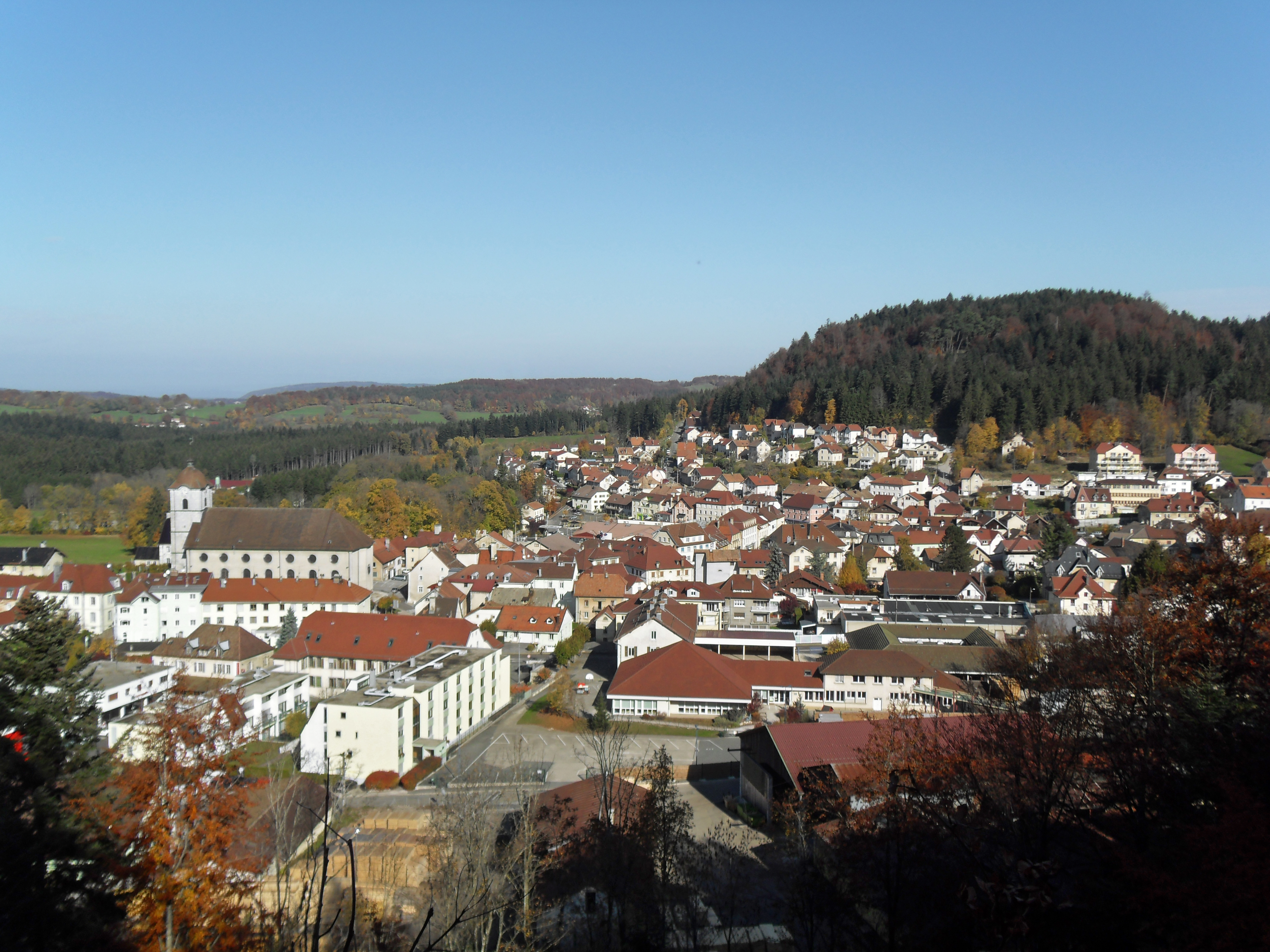
- A general view of Maîche

- Coat of arms
- Location of Maîche
- Location within France Location within Bourgogne-Franche-Comté
- Coordinates: 47°15′07″N 6°48′16″E
- Country: France
- Region: Bourgogne-Franche-Comté
- Department: Doubs
- Arrondissement: Montbéliard
- Canton: Maîche
- Intercommunality: Pays de Maîche

Government
  - Mayor (2020–2026): Régis Ligier
- Area^{1}: 17.42 km^{2} (6.73 sq mi)
- Highest elevation: 981 m (3,219 ft)
- Lowest elevation: 729 m (2,392 ft)
- Population (2023): 4,254
  - Density: 244.2/km^{2} (632.5/sq mi)
- Time zone: UTC+01:00 (CET)
  - Summer (DST): UTC+02:00 (CEST)
- INSEE/Postal code: 25356 /25120
- ^{1} French Land Register data, which excludes lakes, ponds, glaciers > 1 km^{2} (0.386 sq mi or 247 acres) and river estuaries.

Maîche (French pronunciation: [mɛʃ]) is a commune in the Doubs department in the Bourgogne-Franche-Comté region in eastern France.

== Geography ==
Maîche is situated between the rivers Doubs and Dessoubre. It is surrounded by evergreen forests. The highest point in the commune is the Faux Verger.

== Population ==
Historical population
Year	Pop.	±% p.a.
1968	3,714	—
1975	4,381	+2.39%
1982	4,216	−0.55%
1990	4,168	−0.14%
1999	3,978	−0.52%
2007	4,076	+0.30%
2012	4,331	+1.22%
2017	4,286	−0.21%
2023	4,254	−0.12%
Source: INSEE

== See also ==
- Communes of the Doubs department
