= Chevreaux =

Commune in Bourgogne-Franche-Comté, France

- Commune
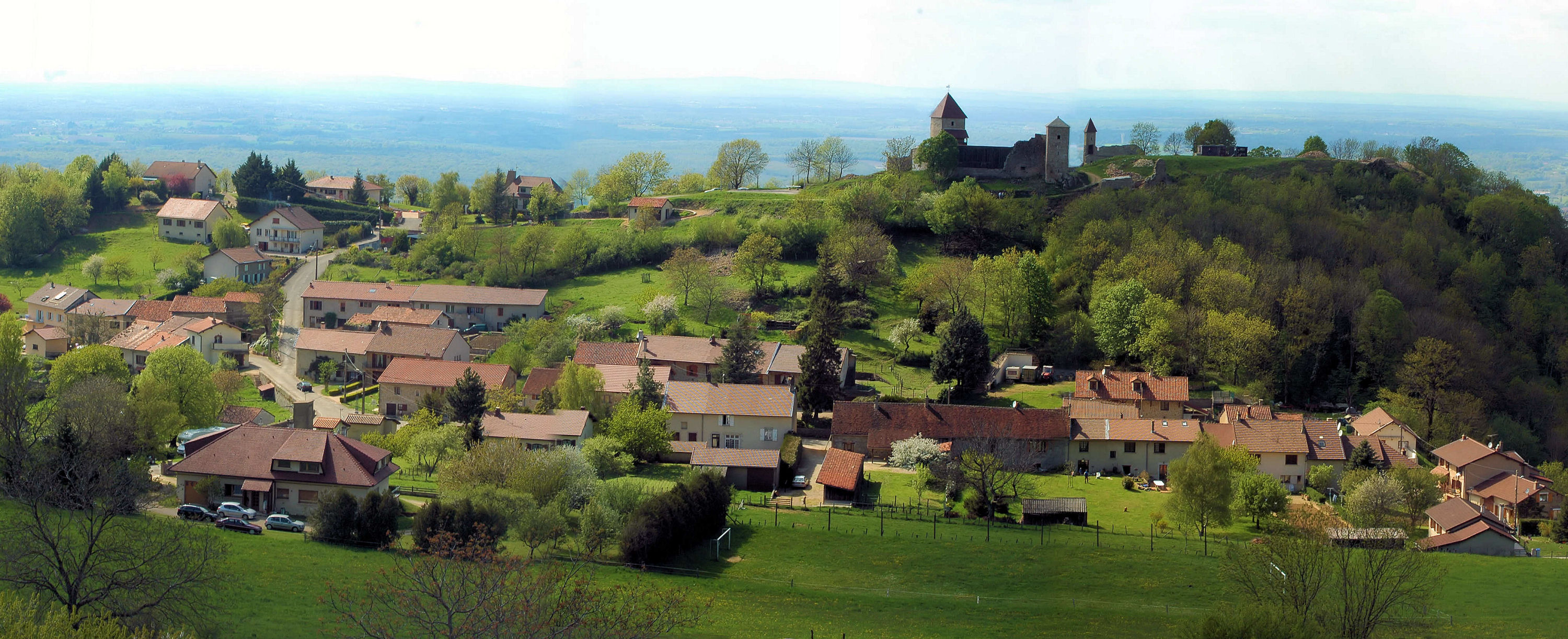
- A general view of Chevreaux
- Location of Chevreaux
- Location within France Location within Bourgogne-Franche-Comté
- Coordinates: 46°30′35″N 5°24′19″E
- Country: France
- Region: Bourgogne-Franche-Comté
- Department: Jura
- Arrondissement: Lons-le-Saunier
- Canton: Saint-Amour

Government
  - Mayor (2020–2026): Bernard Broissiat
- Area^{1}: 6.12 km^{2} (2.36 sq mi)
- Highest elevation: 647 m (2,123 ft)
- Lowest elevation: 275 m (902 ft)
- Population (2023): 124
  - Density: 20.3/km^{2} (52.5/sq mi)
- Time zone: UTC+01:00 (CET)
  - Summer (DST): UTC+02:00 (CEST)
- INSEE/Postal code: 39142 /39190
- ^{1} French Land Register data, which excludes lakes, ponds, glaciers > 1 km^{2} (0.386 sq mi or 247 acres) and river estuaries.

Chevreaux (French pronunciation: [ʃəvʁo]) is a commune in the Jura department in Bourgogne-Franche-Comté in eastern France.

== Population ==
Historical population
Year	Pop.	±% p.a.
1968	196	—
1975	223	+1.86%
1982	225	+0.13%
1990	168	−3.59%
1999	188	+1.26%
2007	147	−3.03%
2012	135	−1.69%
2017	122	−2.00%
2023	124	+0.27%
Source: INSEE

== See also ==
- Communes of the Jura department
