= Guigone de Salins =

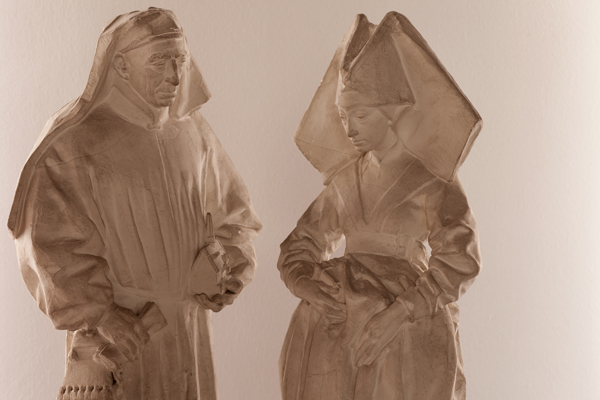
Sculptures of Nicolas Rolin and Guigone de Salins (Lessines)

Guigone de Salins (1403–1470) was a member of the nobility in the state of Burgundy in late medieval France. A well-known philanthropist in her time, she founded the Hospices de Beaune in 1443 with her husband Nicolas Rolin, chancellor to the Duke of Burgundy.

== Biography ==
Guigone de Salins was born into the aristocratic de Salins-la-Tour family in the Jura (part of the commune Salins-les-Bains in the Free County of Burgundy). She was the third child of Étienne de Salins-la-Tour and Louise de Rye.

In 1421, at the age of 18, she married Nicolas Rolin, who was 47 years old at the time of their marriage, and had been married twice previously. Rolin was an affluent chancellor to Duke Philip the Good, ruler of the State of Burgundy. Together they had three children: Louise, Claudine and Antoine Rollin.

She inspired her husband to participate in works of charity, and in 1443 they founded the Hospices de Beaune, or Hôtel-Dieu, in Beaune. This was created as a hospital for the poor, and is unique for its time in its secular approach. Salins furnished the rooms of the hospital with art so that the sick could feel as though they were being treated in a comfortable, even palatial environment.

After the death of her husband in 1462, Salins continued to direct the Hôtel-Dieu until the end of her life in 1470, and it remained open to serve the poor and sick until the 1960s. She is buried in the chapel of the Hôtel-Dieu de Beaune.

== Representations in art ==
Guigone de Salins is represented in Rogier van der Weyden's polyptych altarpiece Jugement dernier, which she and her husband commissioned. She is also depicted in a statue in the courtyard of the Hôtel-Dieu.

The tiles in the hall of the poor and in the chapel of the Hôtel-Dieu honor the love of Nicolas Rolin for his wife: it shows their monogram and motto "Seulle", signifying that she was the sole woman in the thoughts of her husband.

== Gallery ==
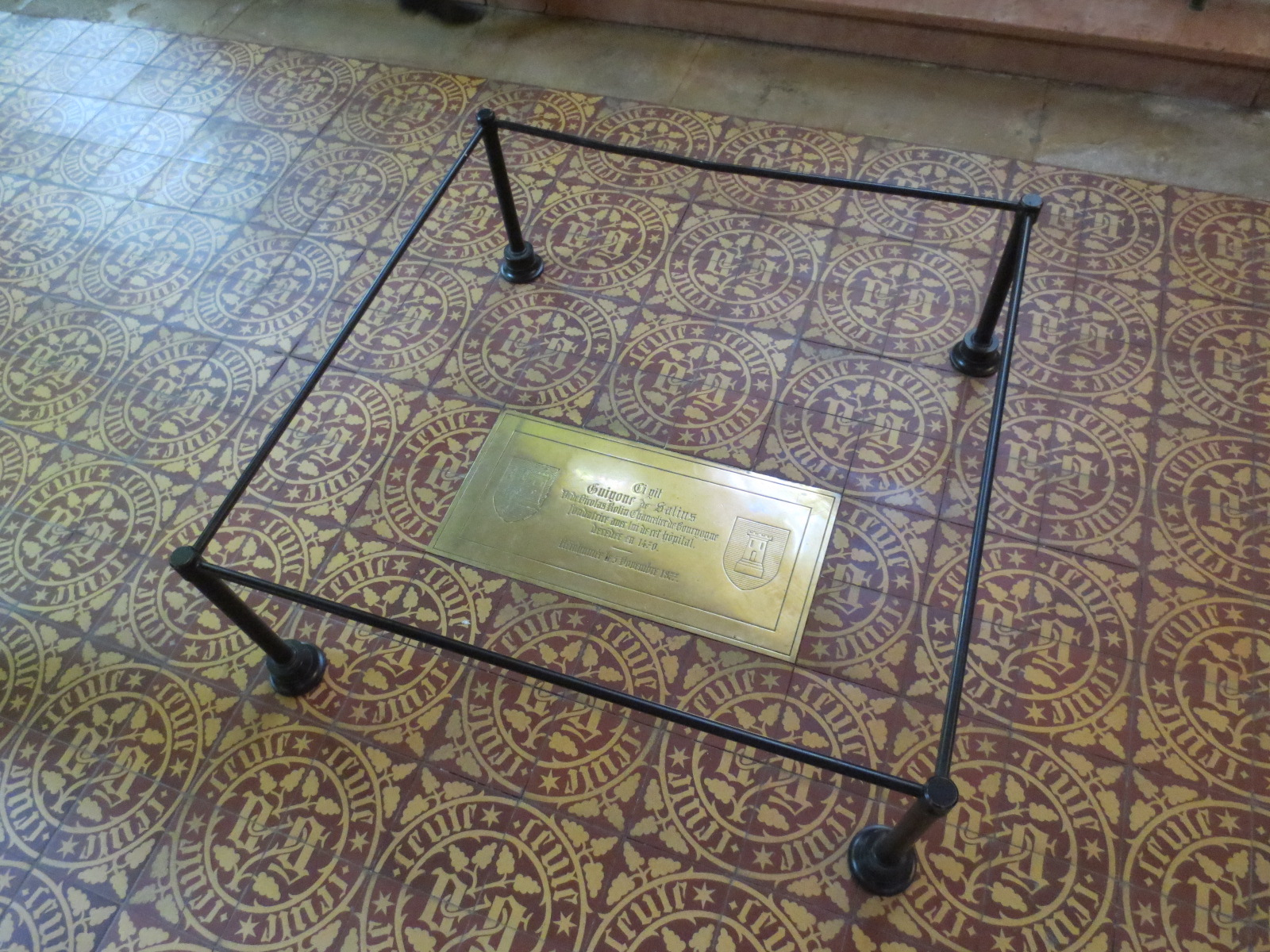
Tiled floor with Rolin and Salins' monogram and motto Seulle (Alone), and a plaque honoring the burial of Guigone de Salins in front of the chapel of the Hospices de Beaune

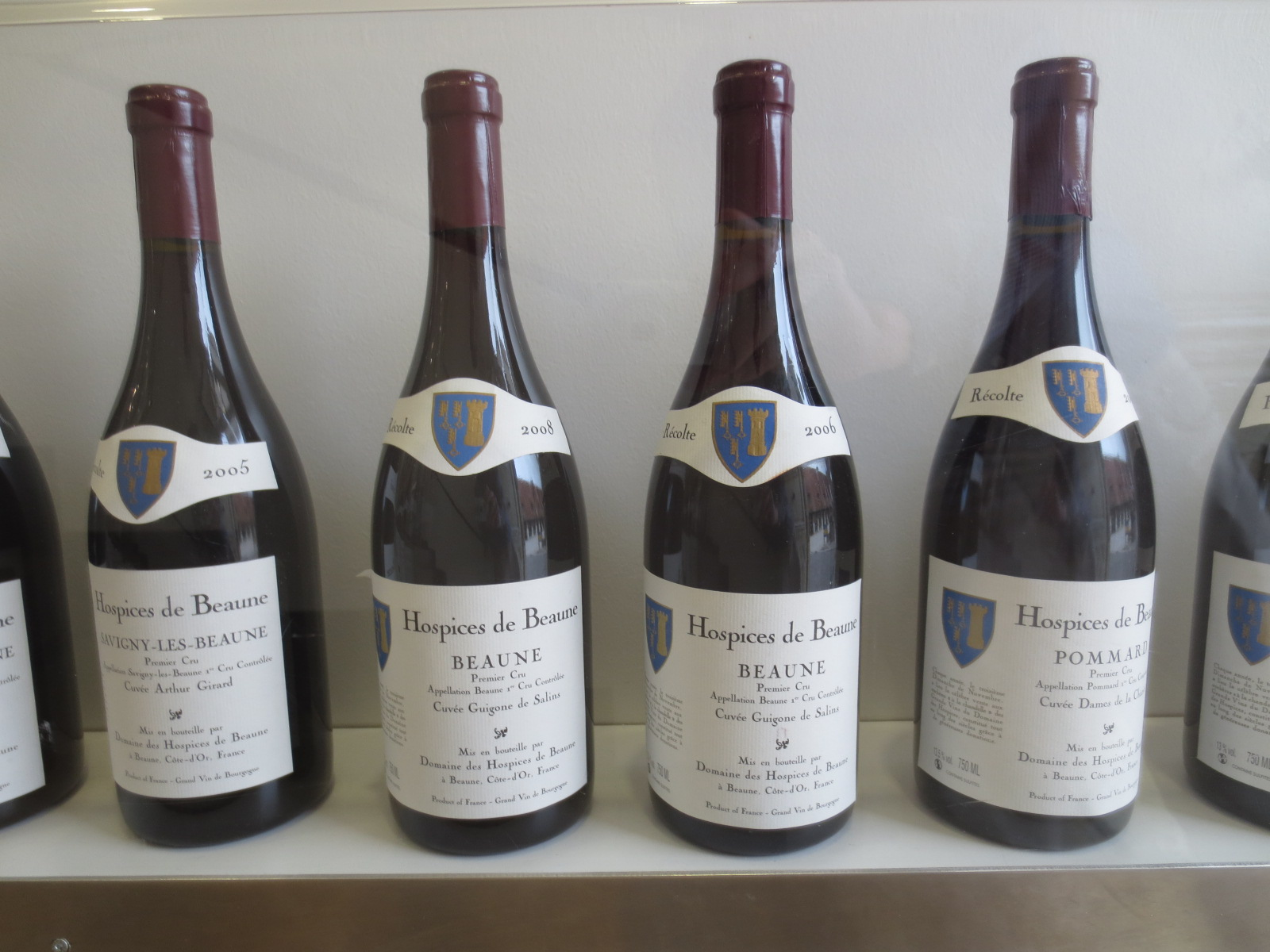
Cuvée de Beaune, a premier cru from the Hospices de Beaune, dedicated to Guigone de Salins

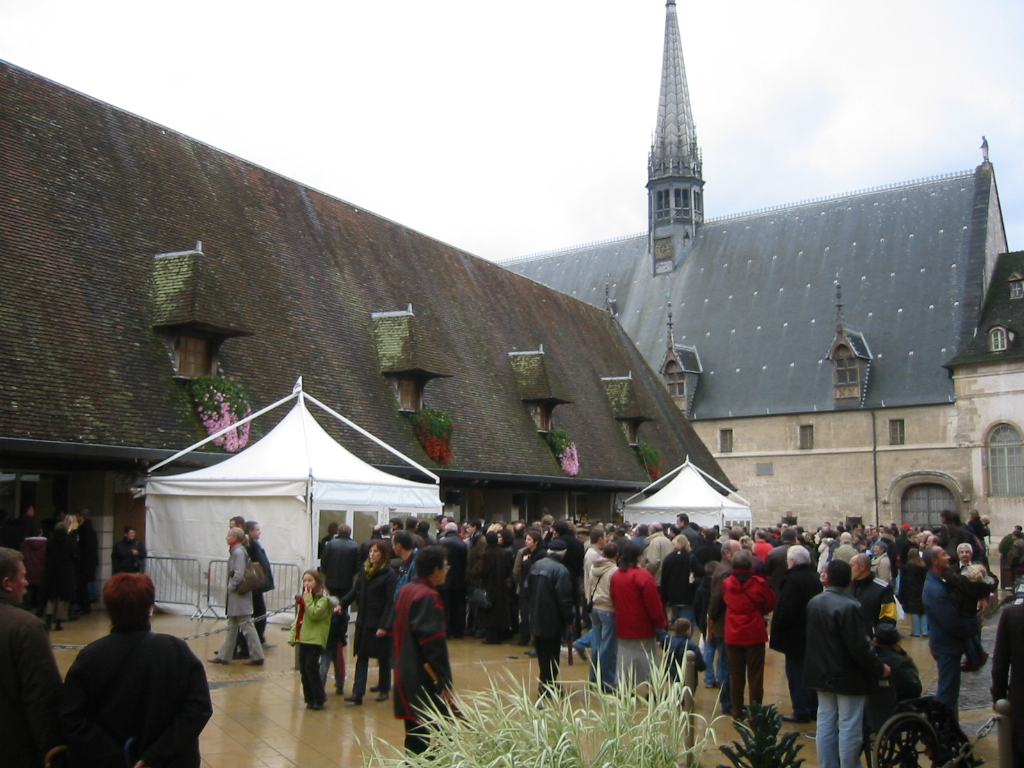
Market at the Hospices de Beaune

== Bibliography ==
- Berthier, Marie-Thérèse & Sweeney, John-Thomas: Guigone de Salins 1403–1470, une femme de la Bourgogne médiévale. Éditions de l'Armançon, 2003. ISBN 2844790615
