= La Paulée de Meursault =

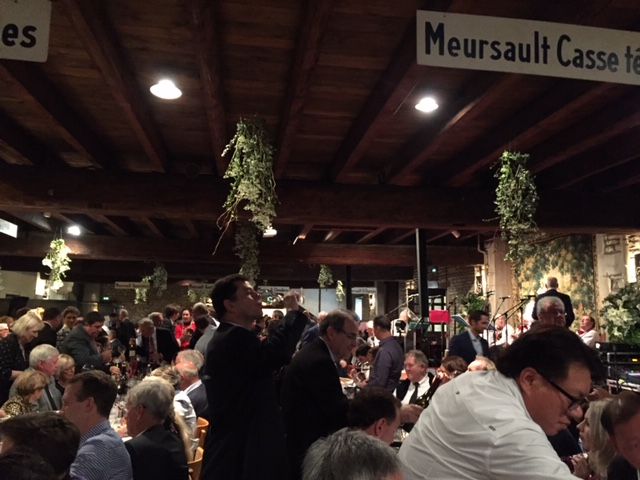
La Paulée de Meursault 2019

La Paulée de Meursault is a lunch celebrating the end of the grape harvest in Burgundy, France. Originally, the celebration included only winemakers, cellar workers, and the surrounding community. It has since evolved to become an international wine event, and an integral part of Les Trois Glorieuses, which also includes a charity auction held at the Hospices de Beaune and a formal dinner at the Clos de Vougeot. Approximately 700 people attend the lunch, held in the Château de Meursault.

The event was formally organized in the mid-1920s by the Count Lafon and Jacques Prieur. Traditionally, the winemakers would compete to bring the best bottle of wine to impress their favorite clients. In the modern era, Dominique Lafon, grandson of Count Lafon, participates in and helps organize the event.

== Other Paulées ==
Since 2000, Daniel Johnnes has been hosting La Paulée de New York and La Paulée de San Francisco, which have been officially recognized by the organizers of the original La Paulée de Meursault. A celebration of the greatest wines of Burgundy, Johnnes' version of La Paulée features seminars, tastings, and wine-paired dinners, culminating in the Saturday Grand Tasting and Gala Dinner. The Financial Times has asserted that La Paulée "can reasonably be described as the greatest Bacchanalia on the face of the earth".

== Etymology ==
The name "La Paulée" comes from the French word for sauté pan, poile. In its earliest incarnations, the post-harvest meal was so simple that it was cooked in a single poile.
