= Theodora Guest =

British author, anti-suffragist, collector and benefactor

Lady Theodora Guest
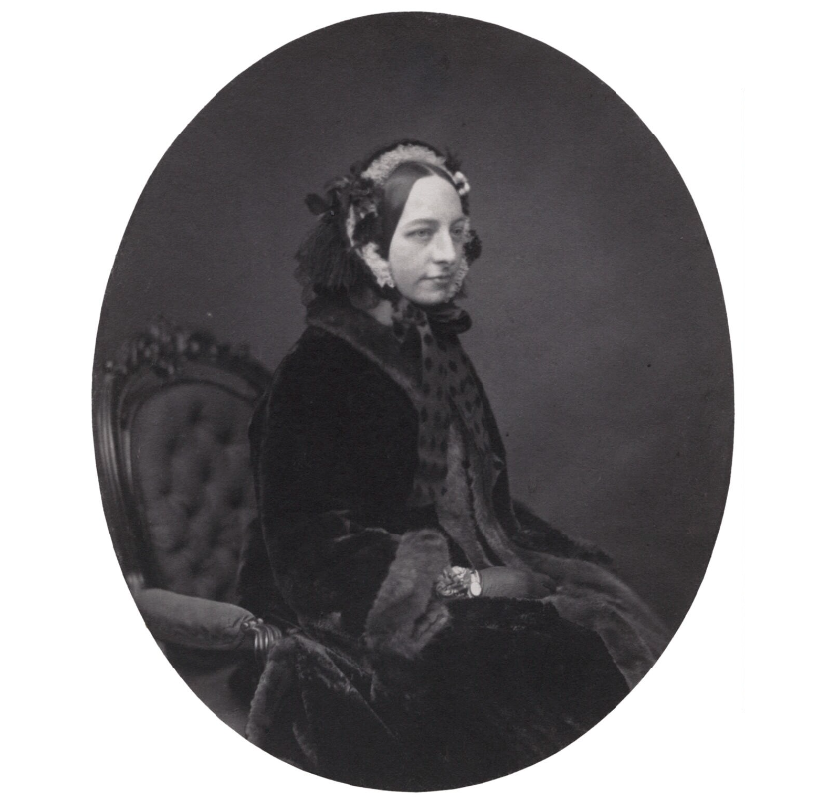
- Born: Theodora Grosvenor; July 7, 1840; London
- Died: March 24, 1924 (aged 83); Henstridge
- Education: by tutors
- Occupation: landowner
- Known for: writing, owning a painting and funding a hospital
- Spouse: Thomas Merthyr Guest
- Children: a daughter

Lady Theodora Guest; Theodora Grosvenor; Lady Theodora Grosvenor (July 7, 1840 – March 24, 1924) was a British author, anti-suffragist, collector and benefactor. In 1913 she sold the 15th century Braque Triptych to the Louvre.

== Life ==
Guest was born in 1840 in Grosvenor Square in London. Her parents were Richard Grosvenor, 2nd Marquess of Westminster and Lady Elizabeth (born Leveson-Gower). They were very rich and also very generous benefactors. They had thirteen children, ten of whom survived to be adults. Her brother Hugh Lupus Grosvenor succeeded her father as 3rd Marquess; he was later created Duke of Westminster. Her brother Lord Richard Grosvenor became Baron Stalbridge.

Her magazine writing lead on to Motcombe Past and Present in 1867 and her enthusiastic Christianity and study was demonstrated in her 1873 book Simple Thoughts on Bible Truths. During this time her father died and left her estates in Dorset and Wiltshire. He had also left her with the obligation to shoulder the responsibility of this endowment and in 1872 she founded the Hunt Servants Benefit Society.

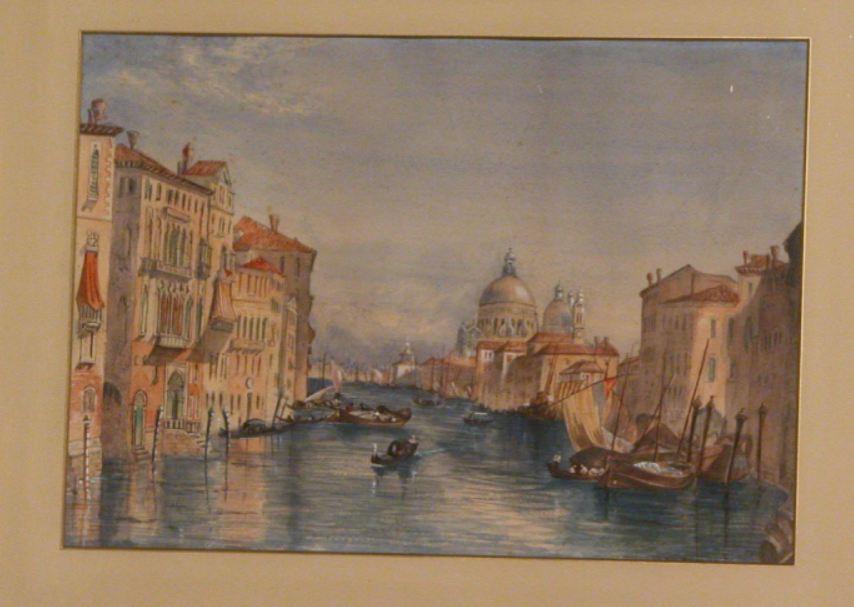
Grand Canal Venice by Theodora Guest given by her to the Earl of Beaconsfield

Her mother bought land in 1874 and had Barcote Manor built for her at Buckland, but Guest married and went to live in Somerset after the birth of their child in 1879. Her husband was Thomas Merthyr Guest, their only daughter was Elizabeth Augusta and they lived at Inwood House at Henstridge.

In 1895 she published A Round Trip to North America which recounted her journey the year before accompanied by her husband, a friend and her maid "Byatt". The book contained photographs which Guest had taken.

Guest's husband died in 1904 and after this she funded the building of Templecombe's "Merthyr Guest Cottage hospital" and paid towards its upkeep for several years. It opened in 1906 and it would treat children for free. It had over 100 in-patients in 1947 and operated until 1974.

In 1908 she published the reasons why she would not be joining the suffragettes and became a recognised anti-suffragist. In 1913 she sold the 15th century Braque Triptych to the Louvre for $130,000. It was said to be their most important purchase for decades and created a record price for the artist Rogier van der Weyden. The painting had been in her drawing room and over forty years before it had belonged to her father. Guest was also a gardener and a collector of porcelain and enamels. She died at Inwood House in Henstridge in 1924.
