= Nicolas Rolin =

Chancellor of Burgundy (1376–1462)

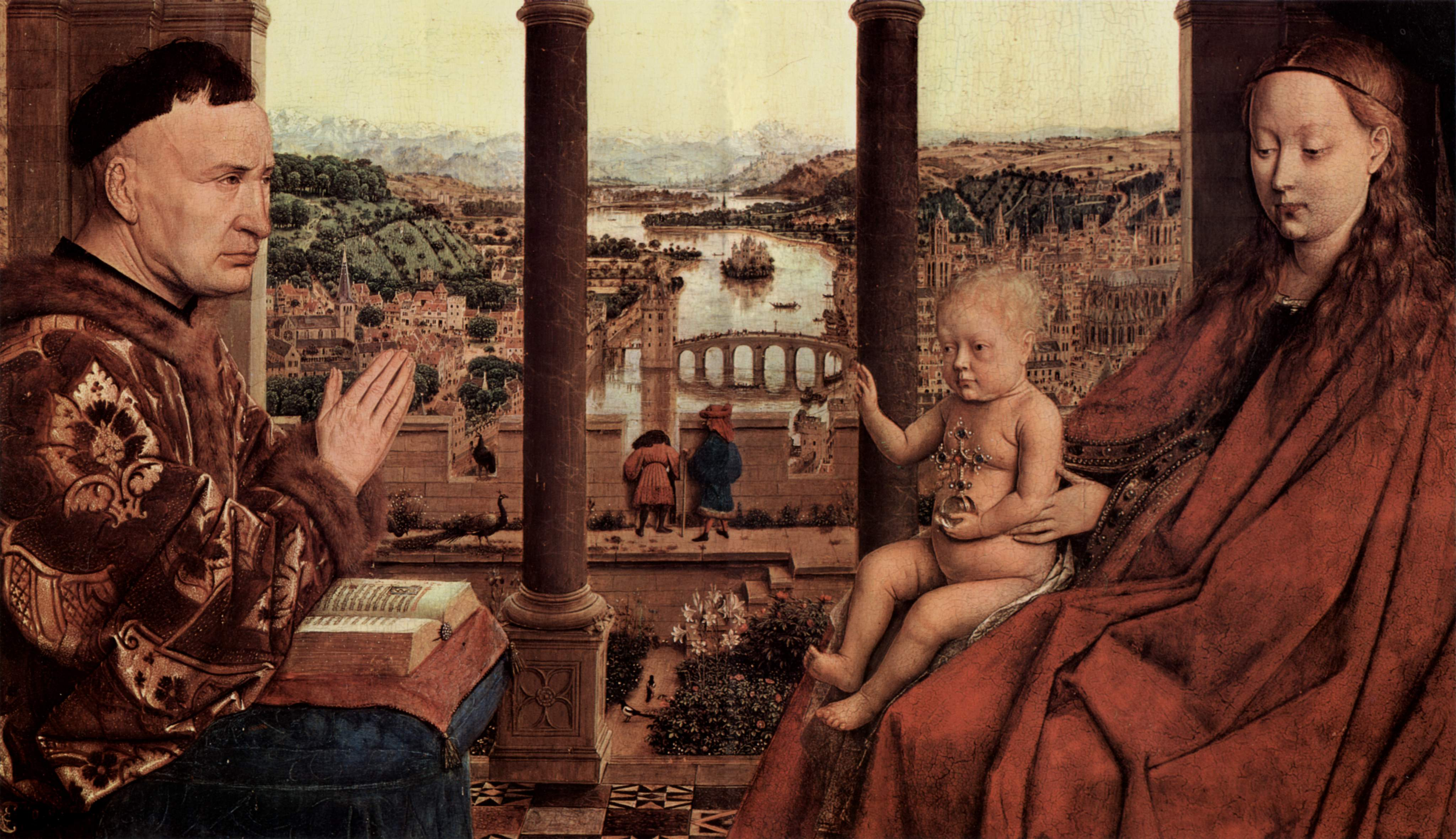
The Virgin with Chancellor Rolin by Jan van Eyck, (Louvre).

Nicolas Rolin (French pronunciation: [nikɔla ʁɔlɛ̃]; 1376–1462) was a leading figure in the history of Burgundy and France, becoming chancellor to Philip the Good (Philip III, Duke of Burgundy).

Born into a Bourgeoisie family in Autun, Rolin's first marriage in 1398 was part of a triple marriage of his widowed mother to a bourgeois of Beaune, accompanied by the marriages of her two sons to two daughters of the bridegroom, Perrenet Le Mairet. However all three of these brides were dead within a few years. He next married Marie des Landes, before 1407, a marriage which paved the way for his entry into the bourgeoisie of Paris.

In 1422, Rolin was made chancellor by Philip the Good, a post he held for more than forty years as one of the principal architects of the monarch's success. Rolin is closely linked with John the Fearless who was godfather to his third son. In 1421, Nicolas Rolin married Guigone de Salins (1403–1470) and together they established the Hospices de Beaune. Rolin was one of the participants in drafting the 1435 Treaty of Arras by which Charles VII recognised the independence of Burgundy, thus separating it from the English in the Hundred Years' War. One of the chancellor's sons, Jean Rolin, was made bishop of Chalon-sur-Saône in 1431, and bishop of Autun in 1436. Jean became a Cardinal in 1448, created by Pope Nicholas V, as part of diplomatic engagement between the Duchy of Burgundy and the Papacy.

Rolin died on January 18, 1462.

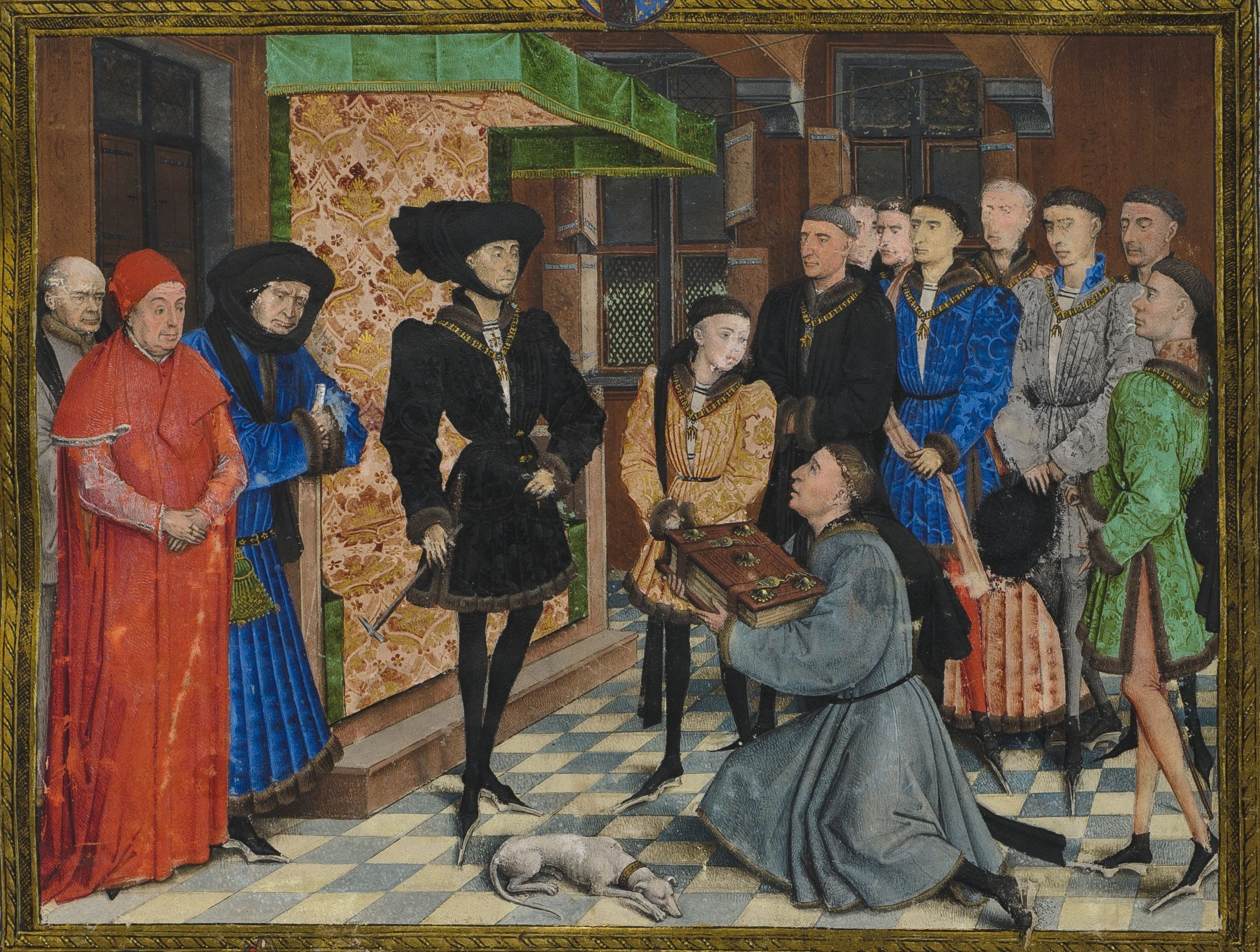
Miniature by Rogier van der Weyden1447-8. Philip the Good of Burgundy and courtiers, with Rolin at his right hand.

The house in which Rolin was born is now the Autun town museum and is known as the Musée Rolin. He owned the Château d'Oricourt and in 1435 he commissioned Jan van Eyck the famous The Virgin with Child and Chancellor Rolin, now at the Louvre. One of his sons was Cardinal Jean Rolin. Another son, Louis, was killed on the field at the battle of Grandson in 1476, while a third, Antoine, held various court offices such as chamberlain to Charles the Bold.

Having founded the Hospices de Beaune with his wife in 1443, in 1452 Rolin established a new religious order, "Les sœurs hospitalières de Beaune". He ordered the painting of an altarpiece, The Last Judgement by the Flemish painter Rogier van der Weyden for the hospices.

== Sources ==
- Charles VII by Georges Minois

Parts of this article were initially translated from this Wikipedia article « fr:Nicolas Rolin », specifically from this version and from this Wikipedia article « fr:Guigone de Salins », specifically from .

Government offices
Preceded by Jean de Thoisy	Chancellor of Burgundy; 1422–1462	Succeeded by Guillaume Hugonet, Lord of Saillant
