= Braque Triptych =

Altarpiece by Rogier van der Weyden

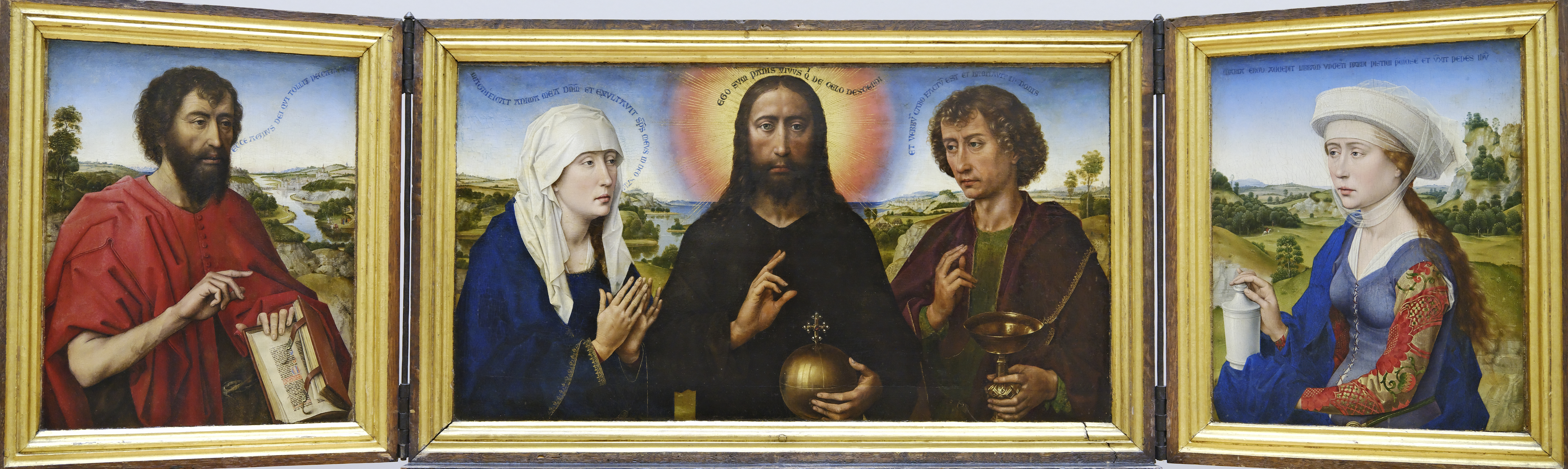
Interior panels of the Braque Triptych. c. 1452. Oil on oak panels with frame, 41cm × 34.5cm; 41cm× 68cm; 41cm × 34.5cm. Musée du Louvre, Paris.

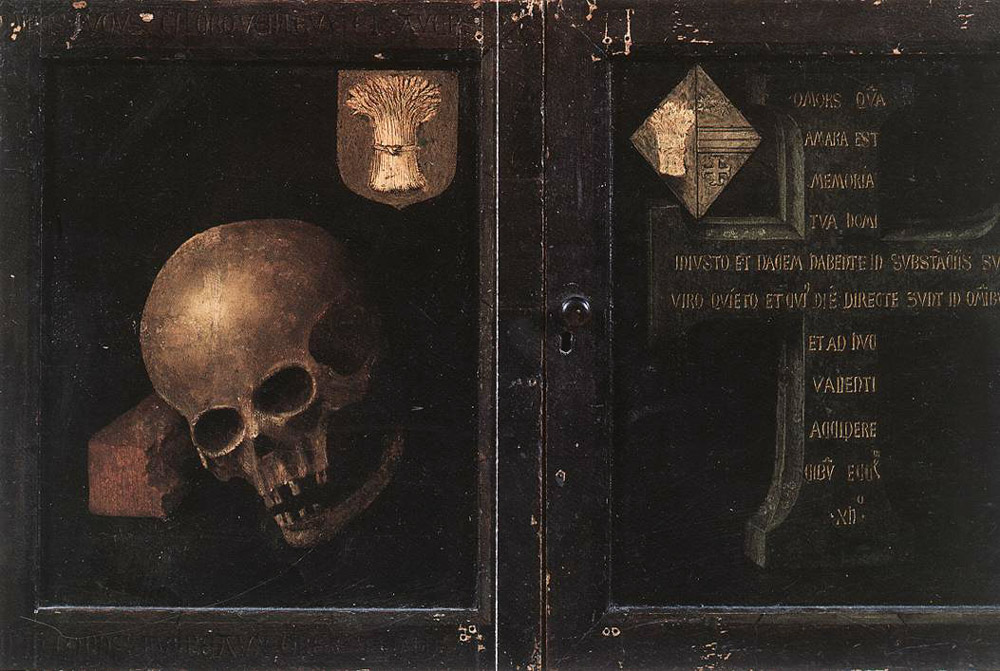
The outer panels shown folded. The skull is likely intended as both a memento mori and a memorial for the patron.

The Braque Triptych (or the Braque Family Triptych) is a c. 1452 oil-on-oak altarpiece by the Early Netherlandish painter Rogier van der Weyden. When open, its three half-length panels reveal, from left to right, John the Baptist, The Virgin Mary with Jesus and Saint John the Evangelist, and Mary Magdalene. When the wings are closed, the work shows a vanitas motif of a skull and cross.

The Braque Triptych is the only surviving devotional work by van der Weyden known to be painted for private rather than public display. The altarpiece was probably commissioned by either Jehan Braque of Tournai or, more likely, his wife Catherine de Brabant – possibly after Jehan's sudden and early death in 1452. The couple had been married for only a brief period. Catherine was much younger than her husband; when they married in 1450 or early 1451, she was 20 and some 12 or 13 years his junior. She evidently held a deep and lasting affection for him. When she died, almost 50 years after him, she had asked to be buried alongside him, despite remarrying years earlier.

Today the triptych is on permanent display in the Musée du Louvre, Paris, in its original oak frame. Because of its fragility, it is encased in glass.

== Triptych ==
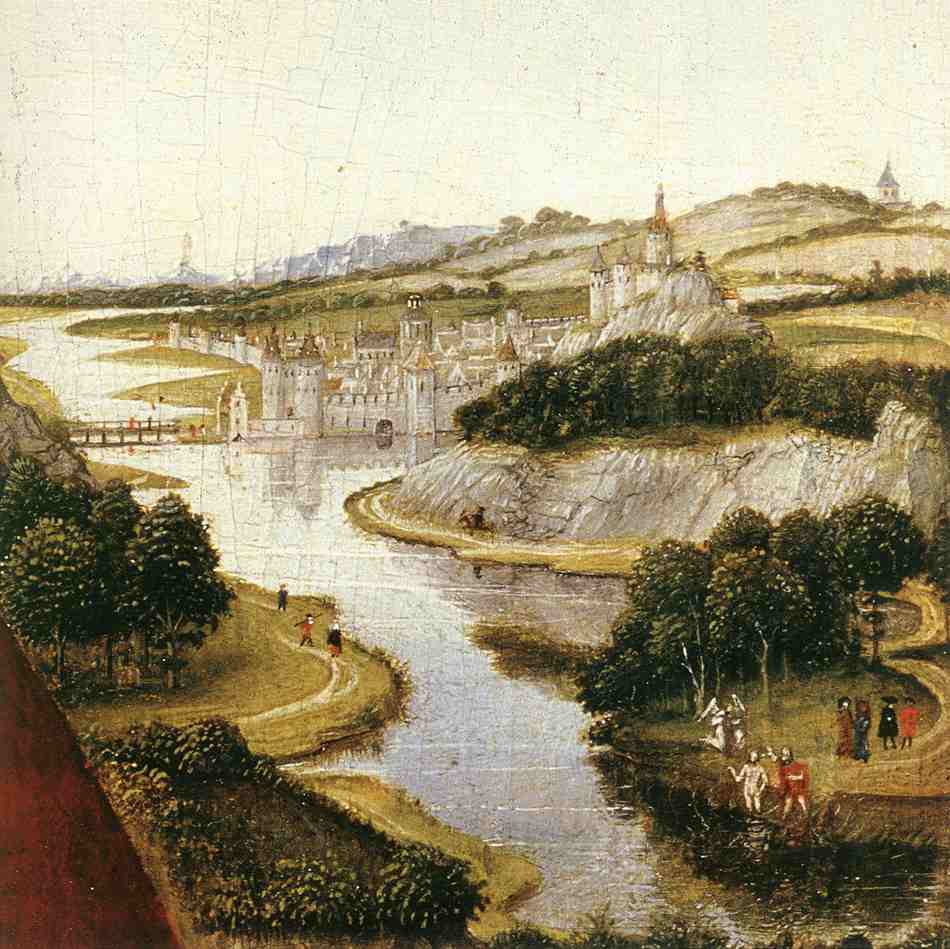
Detail of the landscape behind John the Baptist. As with the disembodied text, the landscape segues across the panel to form a continuous whole.

Inscription and free floating text play a major role in the work. Each interior panel contains Latin inscriptions issuing from the figures' mouths or floating above them, serving as either speech bubbles or commentary. They are echoed by the words inscribed on the cross of the left exterior panel. The texts are all taken from the Gospel of John, except for that of the Virgin's, which comes from the Gospel of Luke. The words of John the Baptist curve upwards from his mouth to the top right corner of the frame, and seem to join those of the Virgin in the center panel, which in turn flow along the top of the center panel.

The words of the Magdalen, in contrast, form a flat horizontal line, breaking the curved left to right continuity of the text of the left and central panels. Similarly The Magdalene's words differ from that of the other panels; they are not uttered by her and instead consist as a detached commentary on her. It is perhaps because of this that they are not rendered with, as art historian Alfred Acres puts it, the "sinuous grace" of the others, as they are "words written of the Magdalene not spoken or written by her." Her text, from John 12:3, reads Mary therefore took a pound of ointment of right spikenard, of great price, and anointed the feet of Jesus.

=== Interior ===
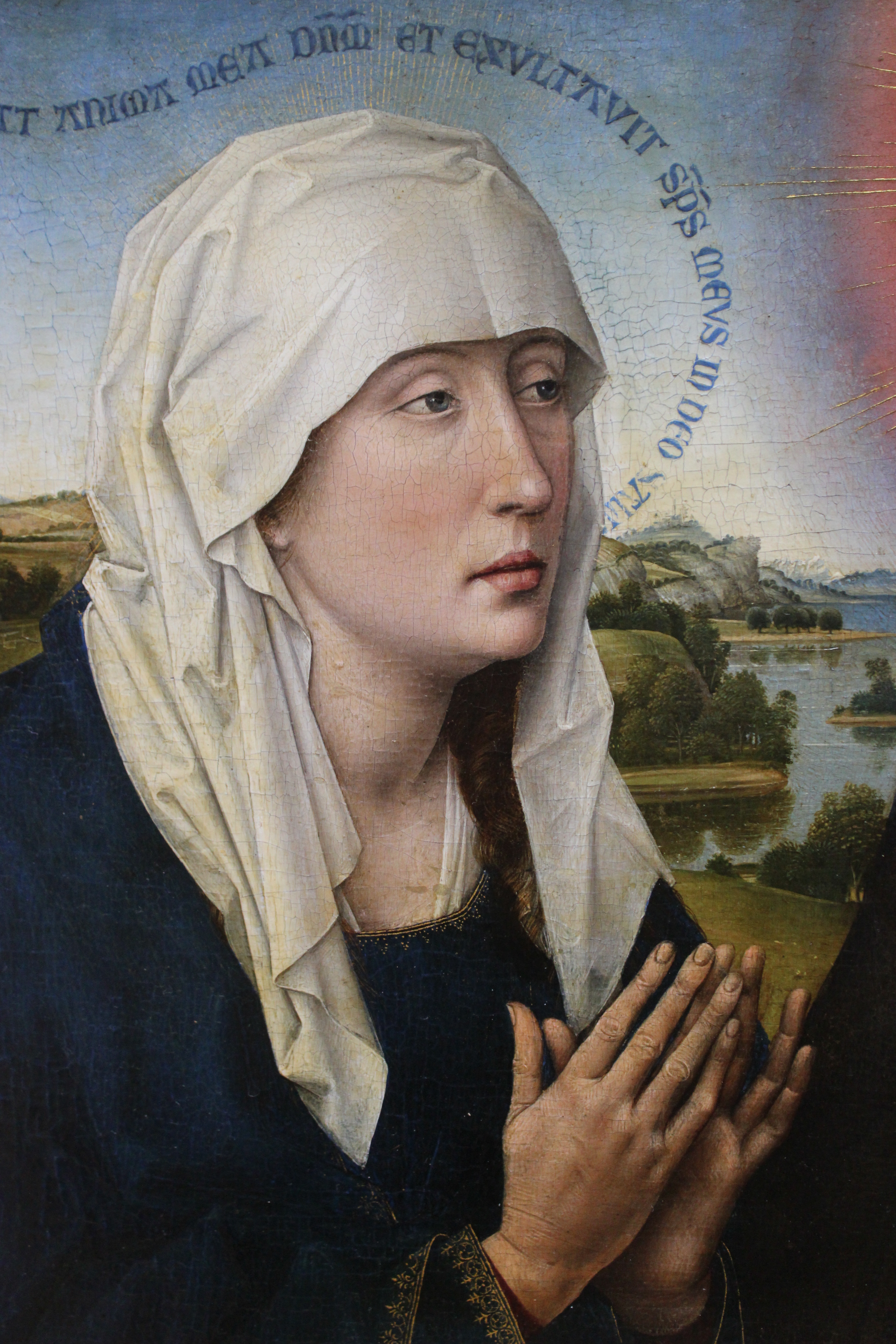
Detail, Mary, center panel

Van der Weyden had used the technique of floating inscriptions earlier, notably in the center panel of his c. 1445–50 Beaune Altarpiece, where words appear to float in the pictorial space or are seemingly sewn into the clothes of the figures.

The left panel is a half-length depiction of John the Baptist, with a background showing a scene from the baptism of Christ. John's words float above him as a curved speech balloon which emits from his mouth. The words, taken from John 1:29, read "Behold the Lamb of God, which taketh away the sins of the world". In the right hand panel Mary Magdalene is depicted in sumptuous and highly detailed dress in an image considered to be one of the finest of van der Weyden's female portraits. At 68 cm wide, the center panel is almost twice the breadth of the left and right panels. It shows Christ Salvator Mundi, his head a near-replica of his depiction in the Last Judgment triptych. The center panel acts as a "picture within a picture", the context of which is "narrated" by the balloons from the mouths of John and Mary.

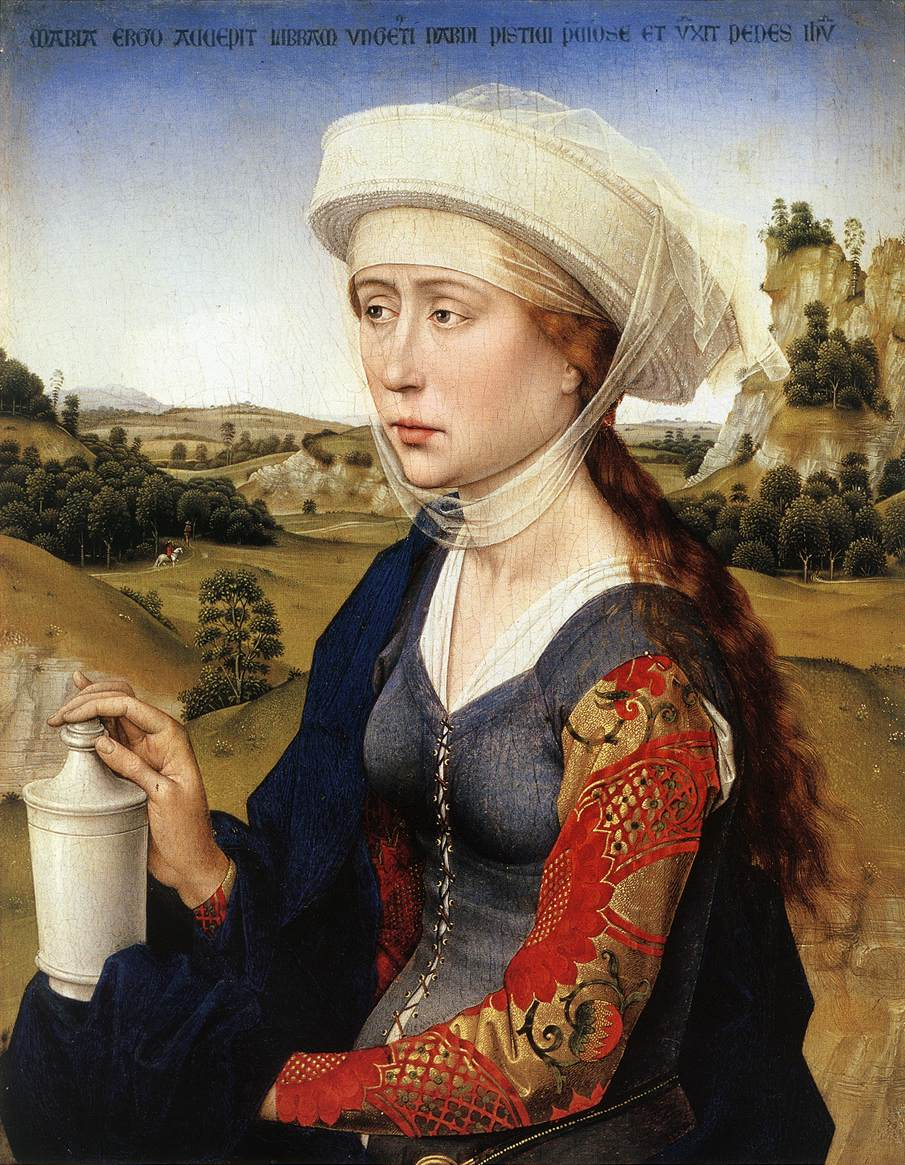
Detail showing the Magdalene

John the Evangelist and Jesus' right hands are raised in the traditional Christian pose or gesture of the teacher. Their index and middle fingers are held upright while their two small fingers are close to their thumbs. The hand gestures and fingers of each saint are arranged in a highly deliberate and symmetrical manner. The pattern they form across the three interior panels echoes the narrative of the triptych as indicated by the balloons. However, the flow is interrupted in the Magdalene panel, her hand is raised vertically as if a barrier to the other panels, while her text is in a straight horizontal rather than curved.

=== Exterior ===
When the wings are closed across the central panel, the exterior reveals a memento mori or vanitas motif of a skull and cross which is decorated with Latin inscriptions. The outer left hand wing shows a yellow-brown skull leaning against a broken brick or stone fragment alongside the coat of arms of the Braque family – a sheaf of wheat – seen on the upper right portion of the panel. It has been suggested that the skull is a future state representation of the viewer. The left frame bears a saying in French uttered by the skull: "See, you who are so proud and avaricious, my body was once beautiful but now is food for worms.." This skull is intended as a "likeness" of the dead Jean Braque, whose coat-of-arms is shown above it, reminding viewers of their mortality.

The panel is one of the earliest known examples of a skull used in a vanitas, while the broken brick, cross and inscriptions present imagery of death and decay typical of the genre. Brick in such works usually symbolise ruin, either of buildings or a dynasties, in this case given the inclusion of the Braque family crest, it can be assumed to serve as reminder to members of the latter. Other art historians believe that the skull may not have been symbolically relevant to the Braque family, as they were well-established as advisers and financiers to the House of Valois. Instead, the argue, it may represent Adam, or a piece of Golgotha.

The right panel contains a cross with a Latin inscription based on Ecclesiasticus XLI: 1–2. The words read as o mors quam amara est memoria tua homini pacem habenti in substantiis suis. viro quieto et cuius viae directae sunt in omnibus et adhuc valenti accipere cibum (O death, how bitter is the remembrance of thee to a man that hath peace in his possessions! To a man that is at rest, and whose ways are prosperous in all things, and that is yet able to take meat!).

== Provenance ==
The approximate dating of the triptych is based the death of Jehan Braque in 1452, and the fact that the interior panels show an Italian influence, and is considered one of the first of his later more austere mature period works; van der Weyden had visited Italy in 1450.

It is first mentioned, unattributed, in Catherine de Brabant's 1497 will when she left it to her grandson Jehan Villain. Records show the altarpiece in the possession of her heirs until 1586, after which it was purchased by a priest in England. It later came into the possession of the English painter Richard Evans. It was purchased by the Musée du Louvre from the writer and benefactor Lady Theodora Guest, in 1913. At the time, it was considered the most important acquisition by the Louvre since 1878 when they were bequeathed a major work by Hans Memling. The museum paid $130,000, which at that time was a record price paid for a van der Weyden; J. P. Morgan had earlier spent $100,000 on the Annunciation now in the New York Metropolitan Museum of Art.

== See also ==
- List of works by Rogier van der Weyden

== Bibliography ==
- Acres, Alfred. "Rogier van der Weyden's Painted Texts". Artibus et Historiae, Volume 21, No. 41, 2000
- Blum, Shirley. Early Netherlandish Triptychs; A Study in Patronage. University of California Press, 1970. ISBN 0-520-01444-8
- Bätschmann Oskar; Griener, Pascal. Hans Holbein. Reaktion Books, ISBN 1-86189-040-0
- Campbell, Lorne. Van der Weyden. London: Chaucer Press, 2004. ISBN 1-904449-24-7
- Engel, William. The Persistence of Memory and Melancholy in Early Modern England. Amherst MA: University of Massachusetts Press, 1995.
- Jacobs, Lynn F. Opening Doors: The Early Netherlandish Triptych Reinterpreted. University Park: Penn State University Press, 2012. ISBN 0-271-04840-9
- Lamb Jonathan. "The Rape of the Lock as Still Life", in The secret life of things: animals, objects, and it-narratives in eighteenth-century England. Associated University Press, 2007.
- Lane, Barbara. "Early Italian Sources for the Braque Triptych". The Art Bulletin, Volume LX11, No. 2, June 1980. 281–284
- Leprieur, Paul. "Un triptyque de Roger de la Pasture". Gazette des Beaux-Arts, volume 10, 1913. 257-80 Archived 2016-10-05 at the Wayback Machine
- McNamee, Maurice. Vested Angels: Eucharistic Allusions in Early Netherlandish Paintings. Leuven: Peeters Publishers,1998. ISBN 90-429-0007-5
