= Hospices de Beaune =

Former charitable almshouse in Beaune, France

Coordinates: 47°1′19″N 4°50′12″E

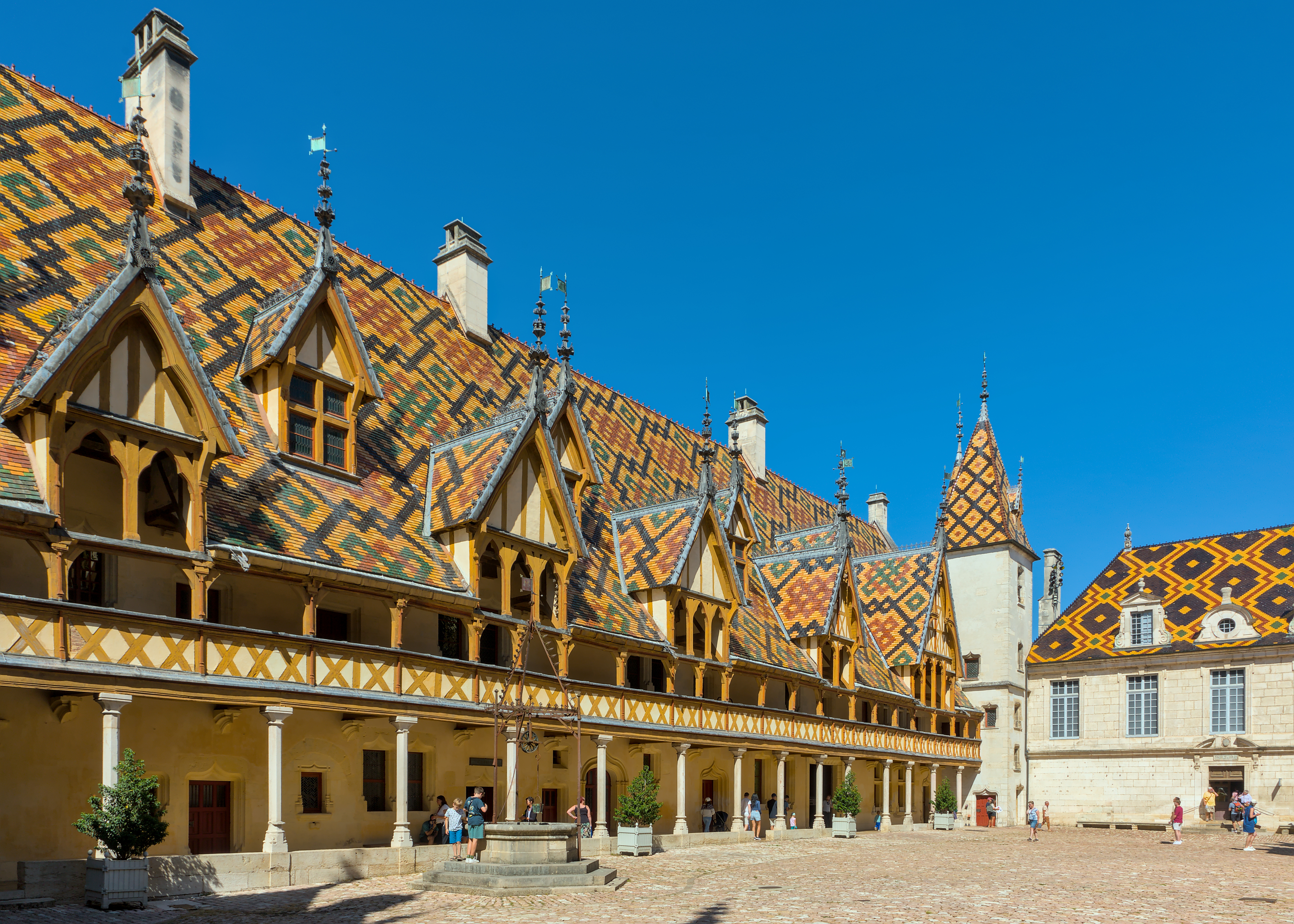
Courtyard of the Hôtel-Dieu

The Hospices de Beaune or Hôtel-Dieu de Beaune is a former charitable almshouse in Beaune, France. It was founded in 1443 by Nicolas Rolin, chancellor of Burgundy, as a hospital for the poor. The original hospital building, the Hôtel-Dieu, one of the finest examples of fifteenth-century Burgundian architecture, is now a museum. Services for patients are now provided in modern hospital buildings.

An important charity wine auction is held in November each year (formerly in the great hall of the Hôtel-Dieu).

== History ==
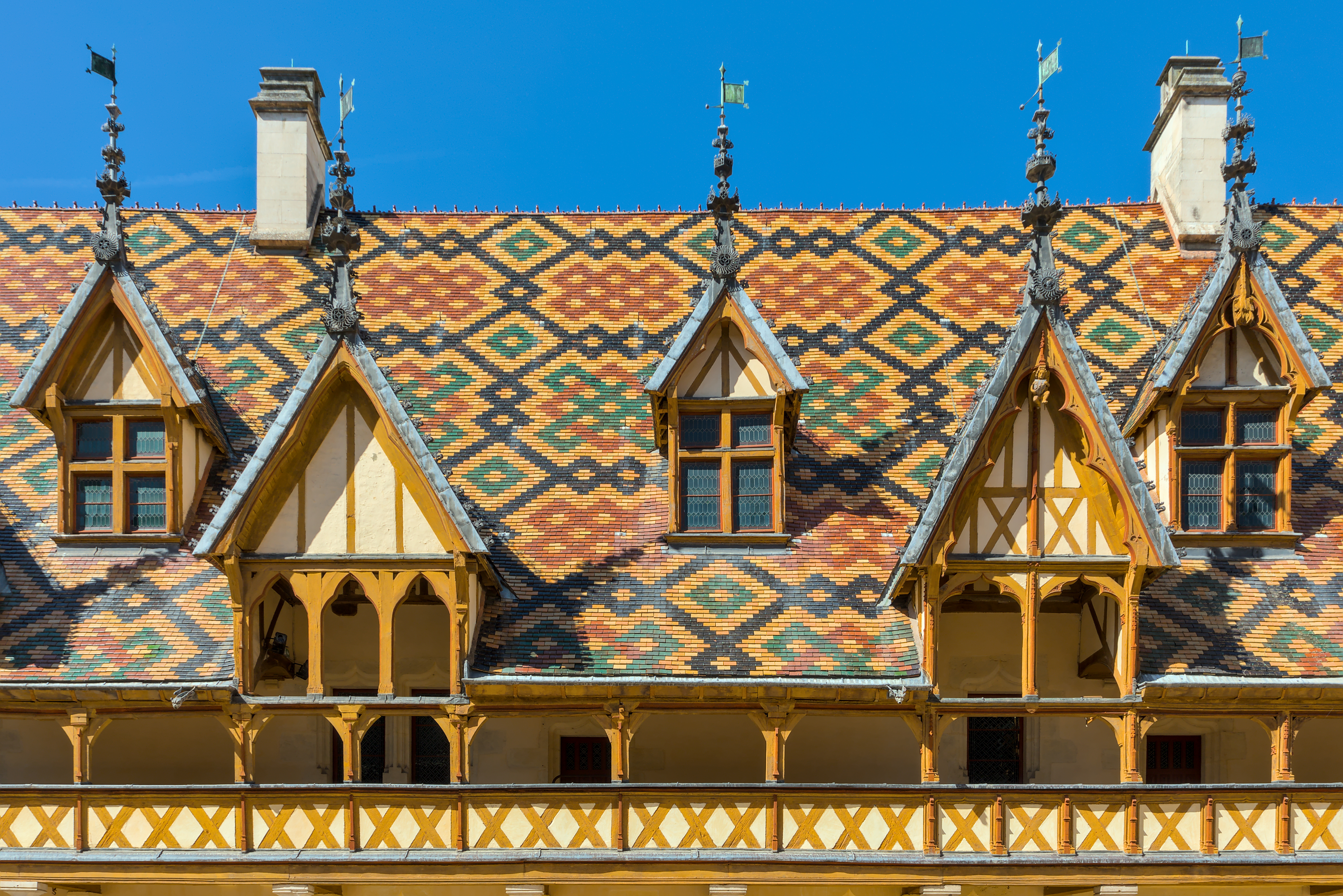
Polychrome roof of the Hospices de Beaune

The Hôtel-Dieu was founded on 4 August 1443, when Burgundy was ruled by Duke Philip the Good. The Hundred Years' War had recently been brought to a close by the signing of the Treaty of Arras in 1435. Massacres, however, continued with marauding bands (écorcheurs) still roaming the countryside, pillaging and destroying, provoking misery and famine. The majority of the people of Beaune were destitute, and the area had recently suffered an outbreak of plague. Nicolas Rolin, the Duke's Chancellor, and his wife Guigone de Salins, responded by building a hospital and refuge for the poor. Having gained permission from Pope Eugene IV in 1441, the hospice was built and consecrated on 31 December 1452. In conjunction, Rolin established the "Les sœurs hospitalières de Beaune" religious order.

The building's design was probably overseen by the Flemish architect Jacques Wiscrère and remained as a hospital until 1971. There is a documentary record of a large range of Flemish and French masons, painters and glass cutters employed for its construction. The façade is today regarded as a superior example of Northern Renaissance civic architecture and a treasure trove of panel painting, given its numerous portraits of Rolin, his wife and members of his extended family.

The Hospices de Beaune consists of a pair of two-storied buildings arranged around a stone courtyard. The building wings are well-preserved today; they contain half-timber galleries and ornate rooftops with dormer windows. The hospital is arranged so that the wings served the office, kitchen and apothecary functions. The nuns and patients were housed nearer the chapel, towards the center of the complex.

The Hospices de Beaune received the first patient on 1 January 1452. Elderly, disabled and sick people, with orphans, women about to give birth and the destitute have all been uninterruptedly welcomed for treatment and refuge from the Middle Ages until today. This Catholic institution focused on healing both the body and spirit of its patients.

Over the centuries, the hospital expanded its holdings and developed associations with similar institutions in the surrounding villages of Pommard, Nolay, Meursault. It received numerous donations from families and benefactors, including farms, properties, woodland, works of art, and vineyards. The institution represents an important example of Burgundy’s historical philanthropic and viticultural heritage and has become closely associated with the region’s economic and cultural life.

== Interior ==
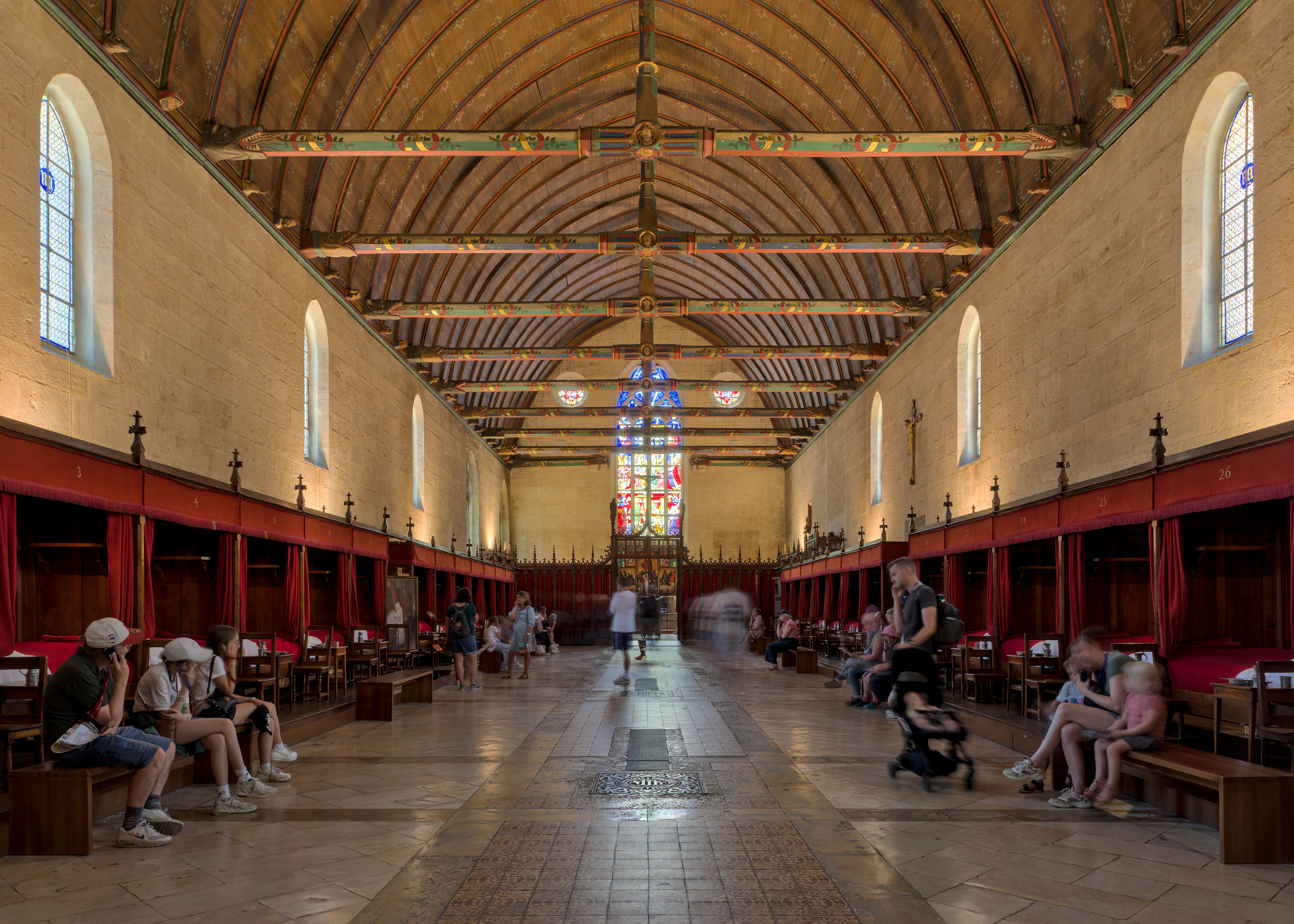
Room of the Poor

The interior's rectangular format makes it the best location to admire the different buildings, three of which are decorated with a glazed-tile roof. This technique probably has its origins in Central Europe (possibly from ceramics master Miklós Zsolnay of Pécs, Hungary) but quickly became a trademark of the architecture of Burgundy (other glazed-tile roofs can be seen in Dijon, for instance). There are four colours of tiles, (red, brown, yellow and green) arranged to form interlaced designs. The current tiles are replicas dating from between 1902 and 1907. The Northern, Eastern and Western buildings include a two-level gallery with stone columns on the ground floor and wood beams on the first floor. Many dormer and attic windows can be observed with finely detailed wood and ironworks. A well with gothic ironwork can also be seen in the centre of the courtyard.

The Beaune Altarpiece, by Rogier van der Weyden

The Room of the Poor measures 50 × 14 × 16 meters. On the ceiling, the exposed painted frame is in an upside-down boat-skiff shape, and in each beam are sculpted caricatures of important inhabitants of Beaune. On the floor tiling are written Nicolas Rolin's monogram and his motto "Seulle estoile" (my only star) referring to his wife, Guigone de Salins. The room is furnished with two rows of curtained beds. The central area was set up with benches and tables for meals. The pieces of furniture were brought together in 1875 by the son-in-law of the architect Eugène Viollet-le-Duc. Each bed could accommodate two patients.

Following the large ward is the chapel, whose location was chosen to allow the bedridden to attend Mass from their beds. The chapel was the original location of the Rogier van der Weyden polyptych altarpiece, now housed in the museum. The remains of Guigone Salins are buried here.

In addition to the altarpiece, the hospice possesses many artistic treasures, among them the mural paintings of the 17th century in the Salle St Hugues.

== Wine auction ==
The charity auction has been arranged annually since 1859, taking place on the third Sunday in November amid a three-day festival devoted to the food and wines of Burgundy called Les Trois Glorieuses. The charity is preceded by a black-tie dinner at the Clos de Vougeot on day one and followed by the lunch La Paulée de Meursault on day three. The Domaine des Hospices de Beaune is a non-profit organisation which owns around 61 hectares (150 acres) of donated vineyard land, much of this classified Grand and Premier cru. With bidding by professional and private buyers, the barrels, from 31 cuvées of red wine and 13 of white wine, attain prices usually well in excess of the current commercial values, although the results give some indication of the trend in expected bulk wine prices for the vintage from the rest of the region.

The auction was organised by Christie's from 2005 to 2020 and Sotheby's since 2021. Setting a record total figure at the 149th auction in 2009 when 799 barrels were up for sale, and 40% bids by telephone, internet, or fax connecting some 500 participants from around the world, the auction has in recent years evolved from a wholesale market to a retail market.

== Sources ==
- Blum, Shirley Neilsen. Early Netherlandish Triptychs: A Study in Patronage. Berkeley: California Studies in the History of Art, 1969. ISBN 0-520-01444-8
- Lane, Barbara. "'Requiem aeternam dona eis': The Beaune Last Judgment and the Mass of the Dead". Simiolus: Netherlands Quarterly for the History of Art, Vol. 19, No. 3, 1989
- Gotti, Laurent (2009). Hospices de Beaune, The saga of a Winemaking Hospital. Editions Féret. ISBN 978-2-35156-048-8
- Sinclair, Keith. Declaration De Hystoires. Leiden: Brill, 1990. ISBN 90-04-09088-6
- Smith, Molly Teasdale. "On the Donor of Jan van Eyck's Rolin Madonna". Gesta, Vol. 20, No. 1, 1981
- Vaughan, Richard. Philip the Good. Martlesham: Boydell and Brewer, 2012. ISBN 978-0-85115-917-1
