= Daniel Johnnes =

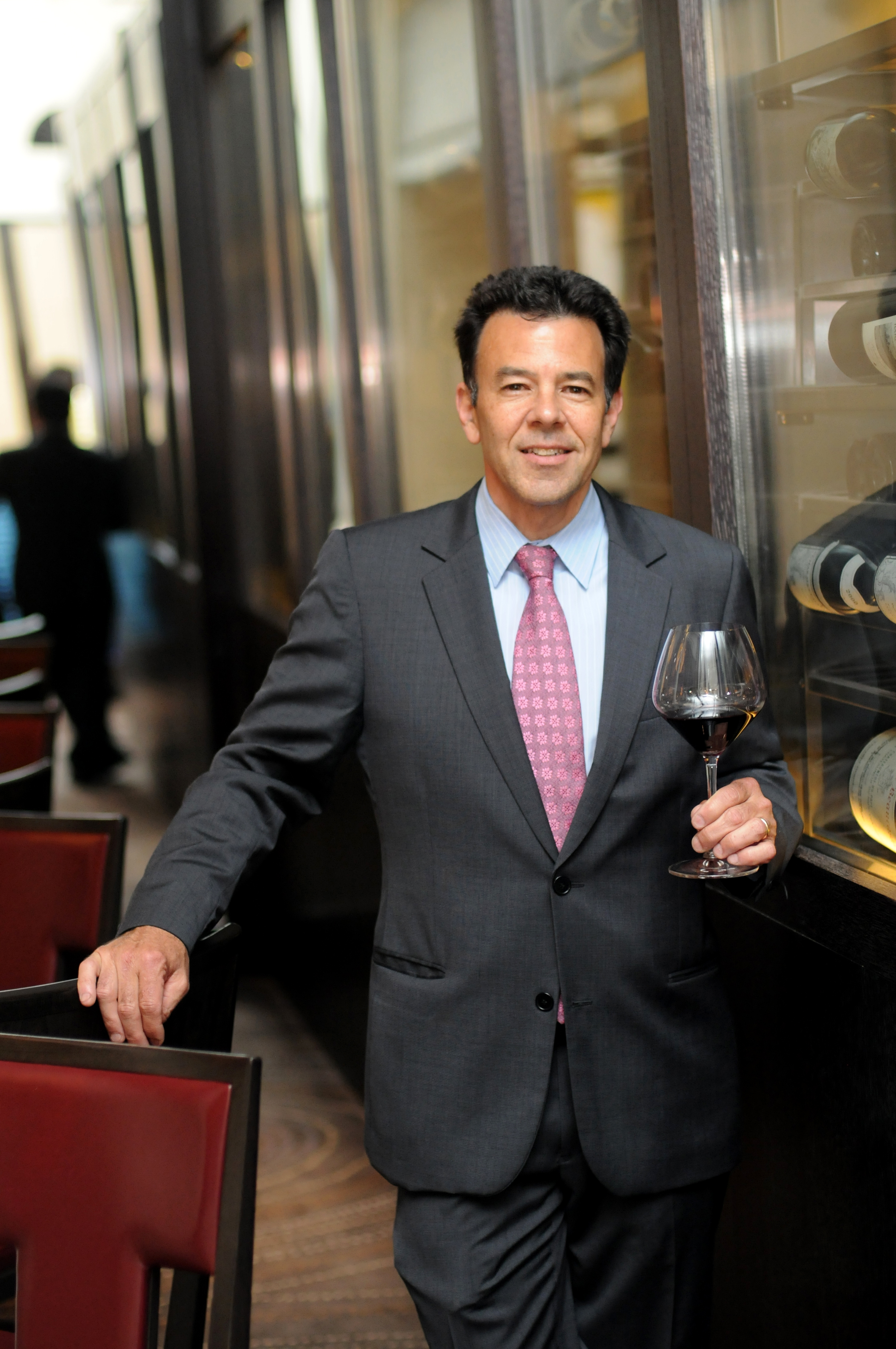
Daniel Johnnes

Daniel Johnnes (born 1955 in Manhattan, New York) is an American sommelier and wine entrepreneur, and longtime wine collaborator with Chef Daniel Boulud and his restaurant group. He is also known as the founder and host of La Paulée de New York and La Paulée de San Francisco which are inspired by the traditional Burgundian harvest celebration La Paulée de Meursault.

== Career ==
Daniel Johnnes has been the Wine Director for Daniel Boulud's Dinex group since 2005. From , Johnnes worked as the Wine Director for Drew Nieporent's Myriad restaurant group including his flagship restaurant Montrachet, where he built the wine list around France's Burgundy region. In 1994, he brought the "Grand Award" from Wine Spectator to restaurant Montrachet, which was anointed one of New York's finest wine restaurants by the same publication.

In 1991, Johnnes finished as one of the top 10 sommeliers in the United States in a competition sponsored by Food and Wines from France. He was named the Wine and Spirits Professional of the Year by Santé magazine in 2000 and received the highest honor awarded to a wine professional, the James Beard Foundation's Outstanding Wine and Spirits Professional of the Year, in 2006. Johnnes also was honored as the nation's top sommelier in 1995 with the James Beard Foundation's Outstanding Wine Service Award.

In 1996, Johnnes published his consumer guide to good value wines - Daniel Johnnes's Top 200 Wines, An Expert's Guide to Maximum Enjoyment for Your Dollar. It was updated with a 2004 edition.

Since 2000, inspired by La Paulée de Meursault, Johnnes has hosted La Paulée de New York and La Paulée de San Francisco in alternating years.

Johnnes also manages a portfolio of his French wine selections, Daniel Johnnes Wines, that are imported into the United States.

In 2016, the French Republic honored Johnnes by inducting him as a Chevalier into the Ordre du Mérite Agricole for his promotion of French wines in the United States.

Johnnes has contributed articles to Food & Wine, Gourmet, Wine & Spirits, and Santé magazine. He has been the subject of feature articles and his opinions have been cited in numerous publications, including The New York Times, The New York Times Sunday Magazine, Food & Wine, Newsweek, Business Week, Vogue, New York Magazine, The New Yorker, Wine Spectator, The Wall Street Journal, Market Watch, Art Culinaire, Elle Decor, and others. He has appeared as a guest on CBS This Morning, NBC's The Today Show, Food Network, Martha Stewart Living and other major network affiliates.

== Personal life ==
Johnnes lives in Brooklyn with his wife, two sons, and daughter.
