= Sivry =

Sivry may refer to:

== People ==
- Auguste-Louis de Sivry, 19th century French art collector and dealer

== Places ==
- Sivry-Rance, Belgium
  - Sivry, Wallonia, a submunicipality
- Sivry, Meurthe-et-Moselle, France
- Sivry (Saisy), Saône-et-Loire, France
- Sivry-Ante, Marne, France
- Sivry-Courtry, Seine-et-Marne, France
- Sivry-Rance, Hainaut, Belgium
- Sivry-la-Perche, Meuse, France
- Sivry-sur-Meuse, Meuse, France
