= Saisy =

- Commune
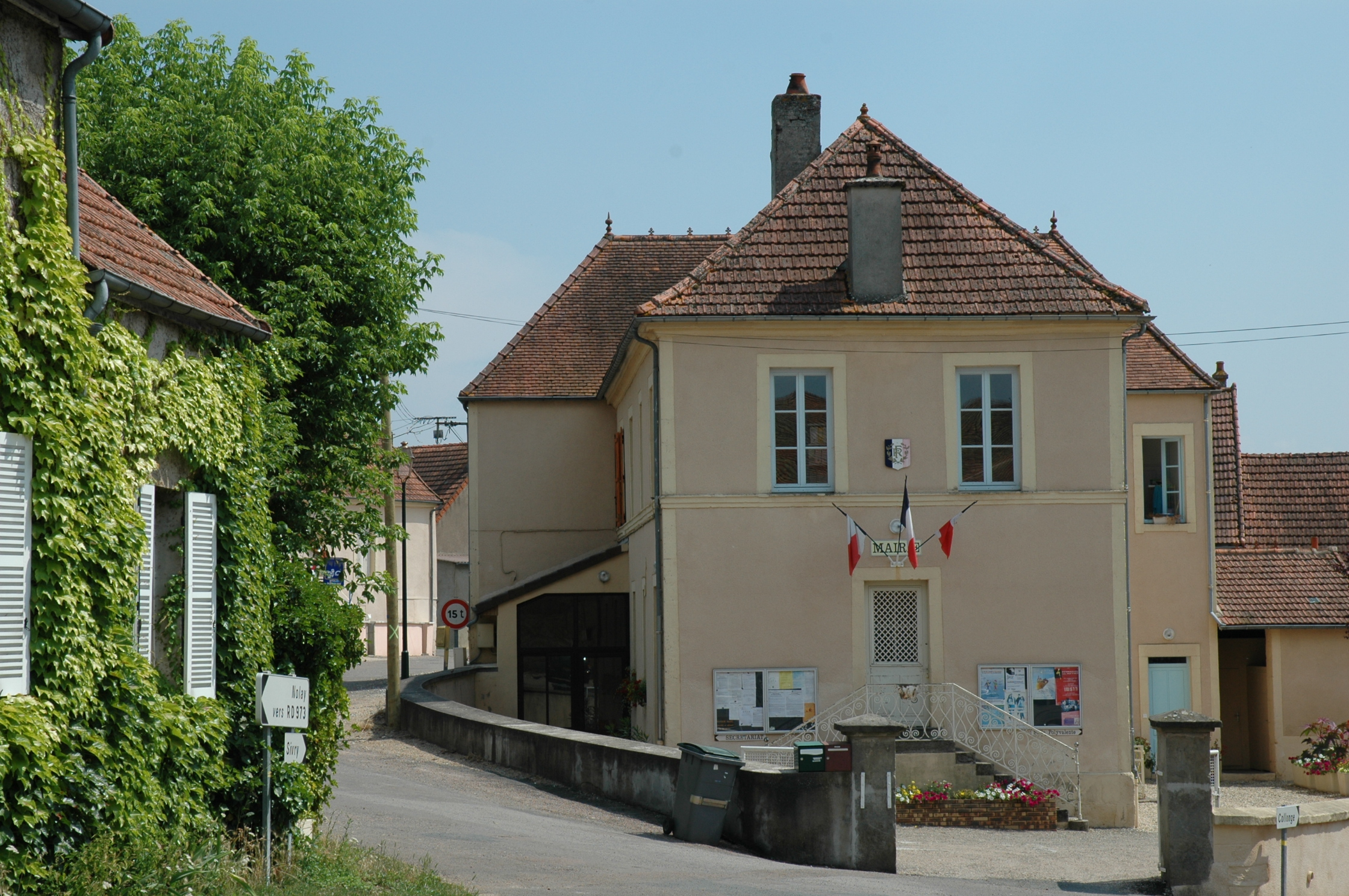
- Town hall
- Location of Saisy
- Location within France Location within Bourgogne-Franche-Comté
- Coordinates: 46°57′N 4°33′E
- Country: France
- Region: Bourgogne-Franche-Comté
- Department: Saône-et-Loire
- Arrondissement: Autun
- Canton: Autun-1

Government
  - Mayor (2020–2026): Christine Canon
- Area^{1}: 17.12 km^{2} (6.61 sq mi)
- Elevation: 363 m (1,191 ft)
- Highest elevation: 471 m (1,545 ft)
- Lowest elevation: 330 m (1,080 ft)
- Population (2023): 350
  - Density: 20/km^{2} (53/sq mi)
- Time zone: UTC+01:00 (CET)
  - Summer (DST): UTC+02:00 (CEST)
- INSEE/Postal code: 71493 /71360
- ^{1} French Land Register data, which excludes lakes, ponds, glaciers > 1 km^{2} (0.386 sq mi or 247 acres) and river estuaries.

Saisy (French pronunciation: [sɛzi]) is a commune in the Saône-et-Loire department in the region of Bourgogne-Franche-Comté in eastern France.

== Geography ==
Saisy is located 28 km (17 mi) from Beaune, 37 km (23 mi) from Chalon-sur-Saône and 21 km (13 mi) from Autun.

An aerial view of Saisy (le Bourg) from geoportail.fr.

The Chalon-Autun-Beaune triangle is known for its scenery, cuisine and wines. It is gradually becoming a popular place for second home owners from Paris, Holland and increasingly the UK and the US.

There are views across the countryside from every part of the commune, yet busy towns and cities, not least Dijon and Lyon, are on the doorstep. Saisy le Bourg is 5 km (3.1 mi) from Épinac and 6 km (3.7 mi) from Nolay, the birthplace of Lazare Carnot in the Côte-d'Or département.

The commune of Saisy is composed of five hamlets, le Bourg where the town hall, the church and the school are situated, Sivry, la Vesvre de Saisy, la Forêt de Saisy and Changey.

== History ==
There are two important monuments at Saisy le Bourg; the twelfth century Church and the Statue of the Madonna. In the year 2000 two signs were added to the RD 973 indicating "Église Romane du XII eme". The choir stalls, the bell tower and the apse are 12th century. The apse is built entirely out of local stone and vaults support the roof in roofing stones. The statue of the Madonna commands a view across the valley and was erected to commemorate the 50th anniversary of a miracle at Lourdes on 8 September 1884. Local school children traditionally visited the monument on The Feast of the Assumption of the Blessed Virgin Mary on 15 August but the last procession was in the 1960s. Latterly the statue also became a war memorial.

== Demographics ==
Historical population
Year	Pop.	±% p.a.
1968	427	—
1975	368	−2.10%
1982	329	−1.59%
1990	305	−0.94%
1999	308	+0.11%
2007	316	+0.32%
2012	319	+0.19%
2017	334	+0.92%
2023	350	+0.78%
Source: INSEE

== Sights ==
The twelfth century church opposite the town hall is classified by the l'Architecte de Batiments de France. This affords protection to the houses in le Bourg, with planning permission requiring their approval as well as the local maire.

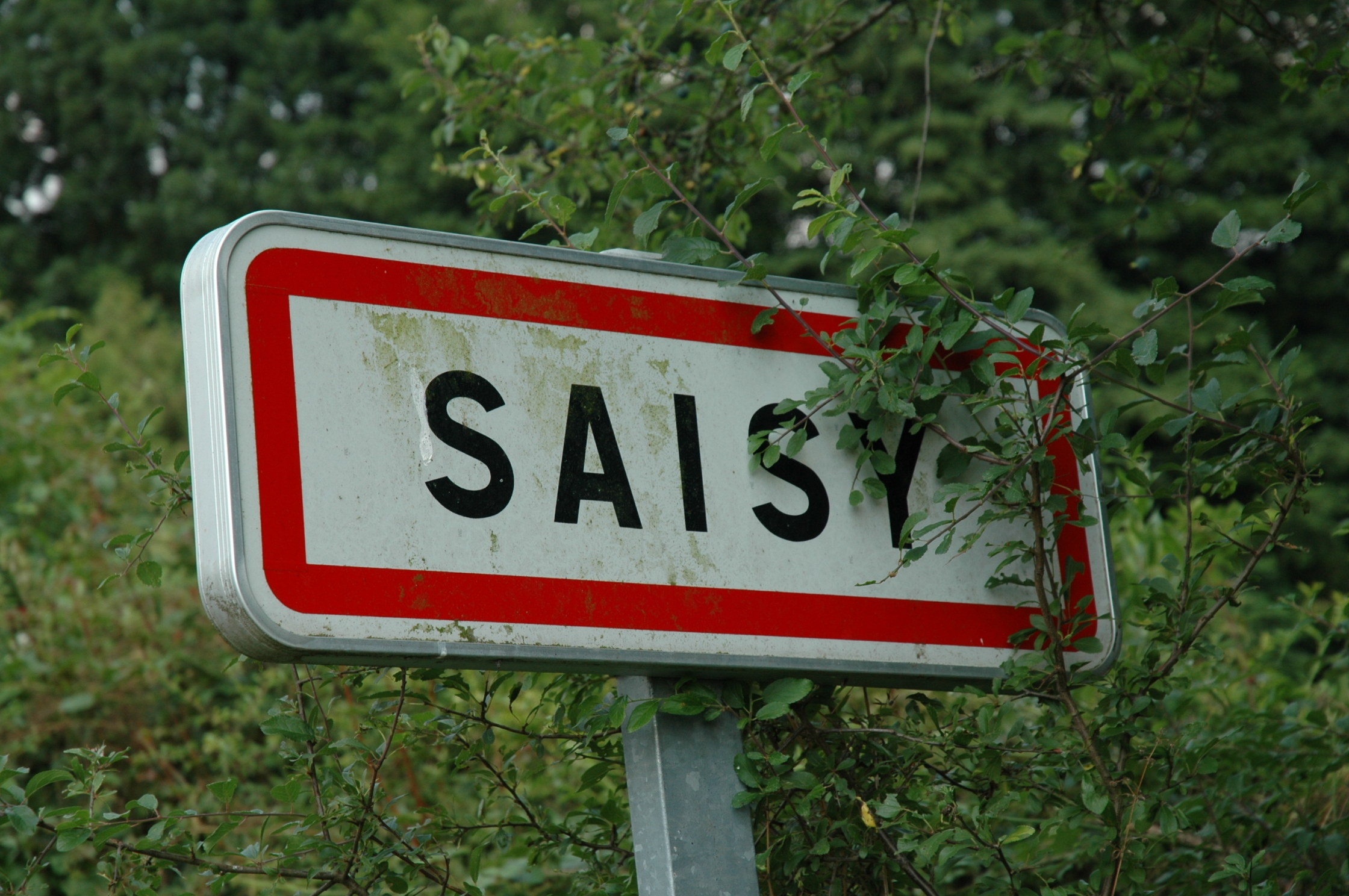

The Morvan National Park was the base for the French Resistance in the Second World War.

Local vineyards include: Pommard, Volnay, Gevrey-Chambertin, Nuits-Saint-Georges, Clos de Vougeot, Pernand-Vergelesses, Ladoix-Serrigny, Aloxe-Corton, Savigny-lès-Beaune, Chorey-lès-Beaune, Beaune, Corton-Charlemagne, Saint Romain, Monthélie, Auxey-Duresses, Meursault, Montrachet, Saint-Aubin, Puligny-Montrachet, Chassagne-Montrachet, Santenay, Bouzeron, Rully, Mercurey, Givry, Buxy, and Montagny.

== Transportation ==
Saisy is about 400 miles (644 km) from Calais and Boulogne-sur-Mer and can be reached by motorway via Paris or Rheims, with the last half an hour from Beaune via the route des Grands Crus and the vineyards of the Côte and Hautes Côte de Beaune. The French motorway system is second to none and Switzerland, Germany and even Italy are all within a few hours drive.

There are cheap flights from the UK to Lyon or Geneva which are only 2 hours drive from the commune.

The TGV rail link passes close by and a 20-minute drive to Gare du Creusot TGV means you can park your car (free) at the station and take a day trip (or longer) to Paris or even London.

== Neighboring places ==
The market towns of Épinac, Nolay and la Rochepot are within 3 miles each side of the commune where there are supermarkets, garages and restaurants.

Highlights of the area north of Saisy include Beaune (of course), Clos de Vougeot, the 15th century Hôtel-Dieu, Beaune, medieval Chateau de la Rochepot is only 5 kilometres (3 mi)away.

To the southwest, 20 minutes along the D973 from the commune of Saisy and the gateway to the Morvan National Park is the city of Autun. Even before it was conquered by Julius Cæsar, Autun was a bustling city. Through the centuries it has been renowned for its Roman ruins, the 12th Century Cathedral, its Romanesque sculptures, its Rolin Museum and its history.

== See also ==
- Communes of the Saône-et-Loire department

== Gallery ==
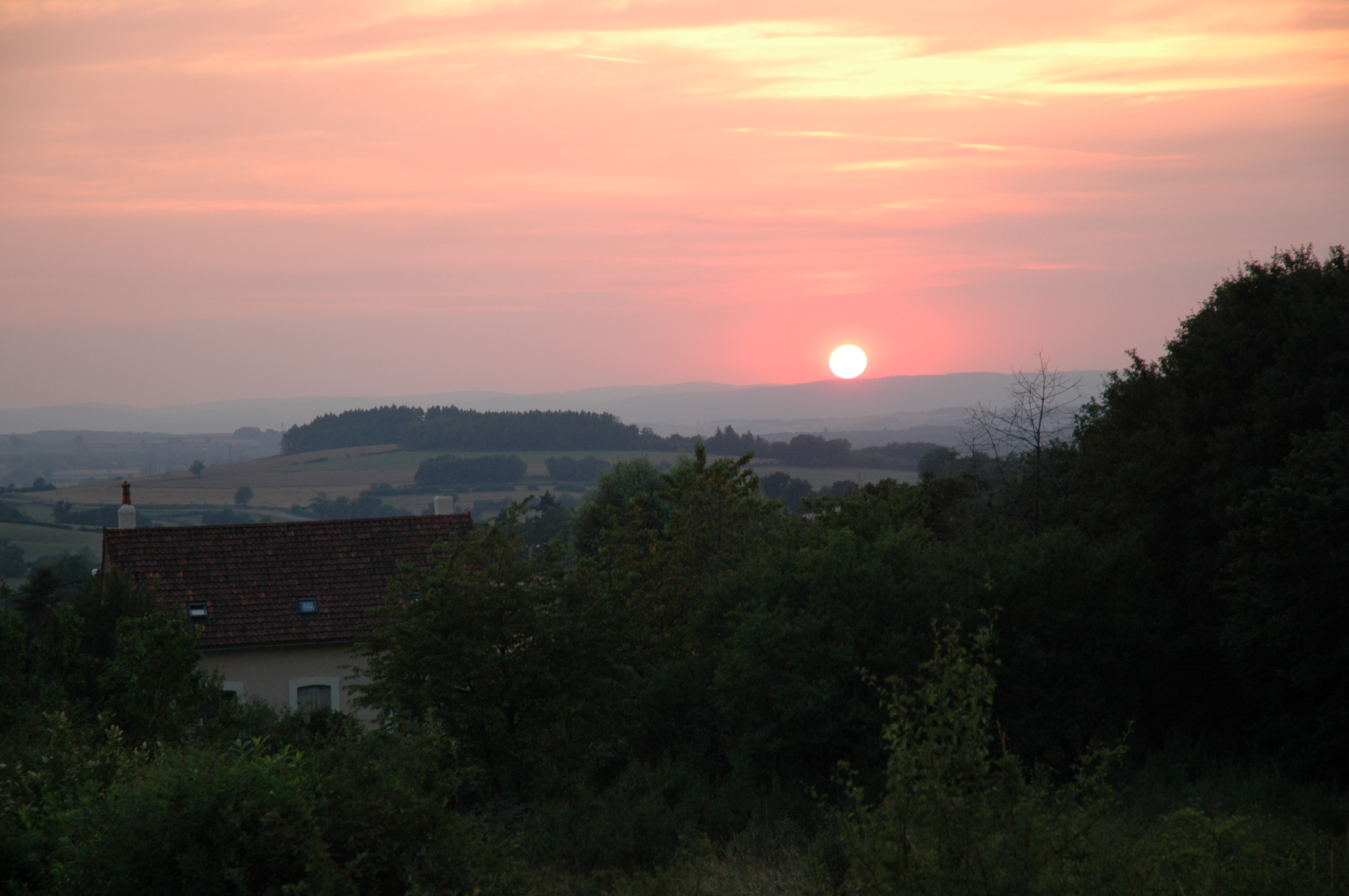
A Sunset in Saisy

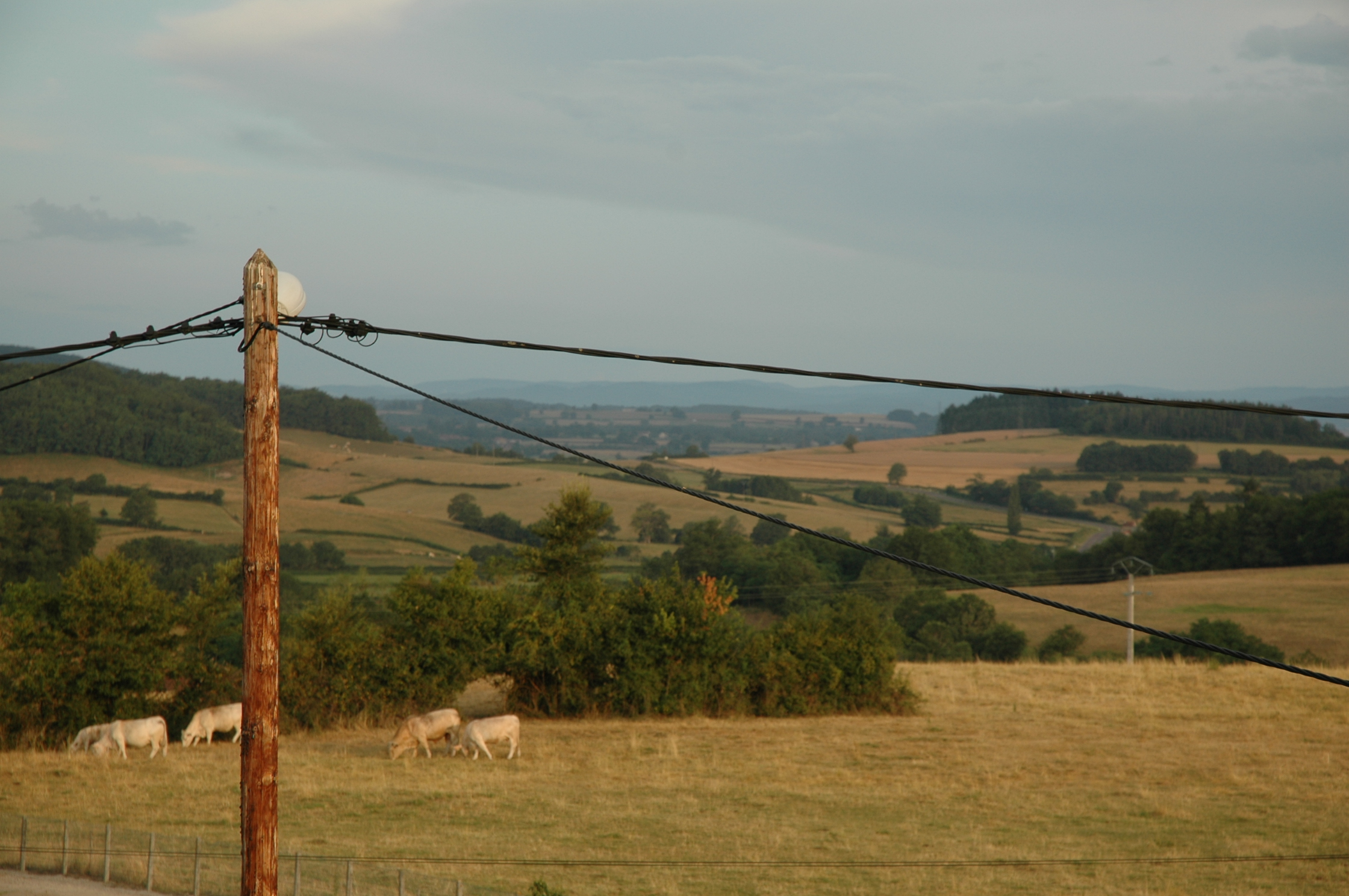
View from Saisy

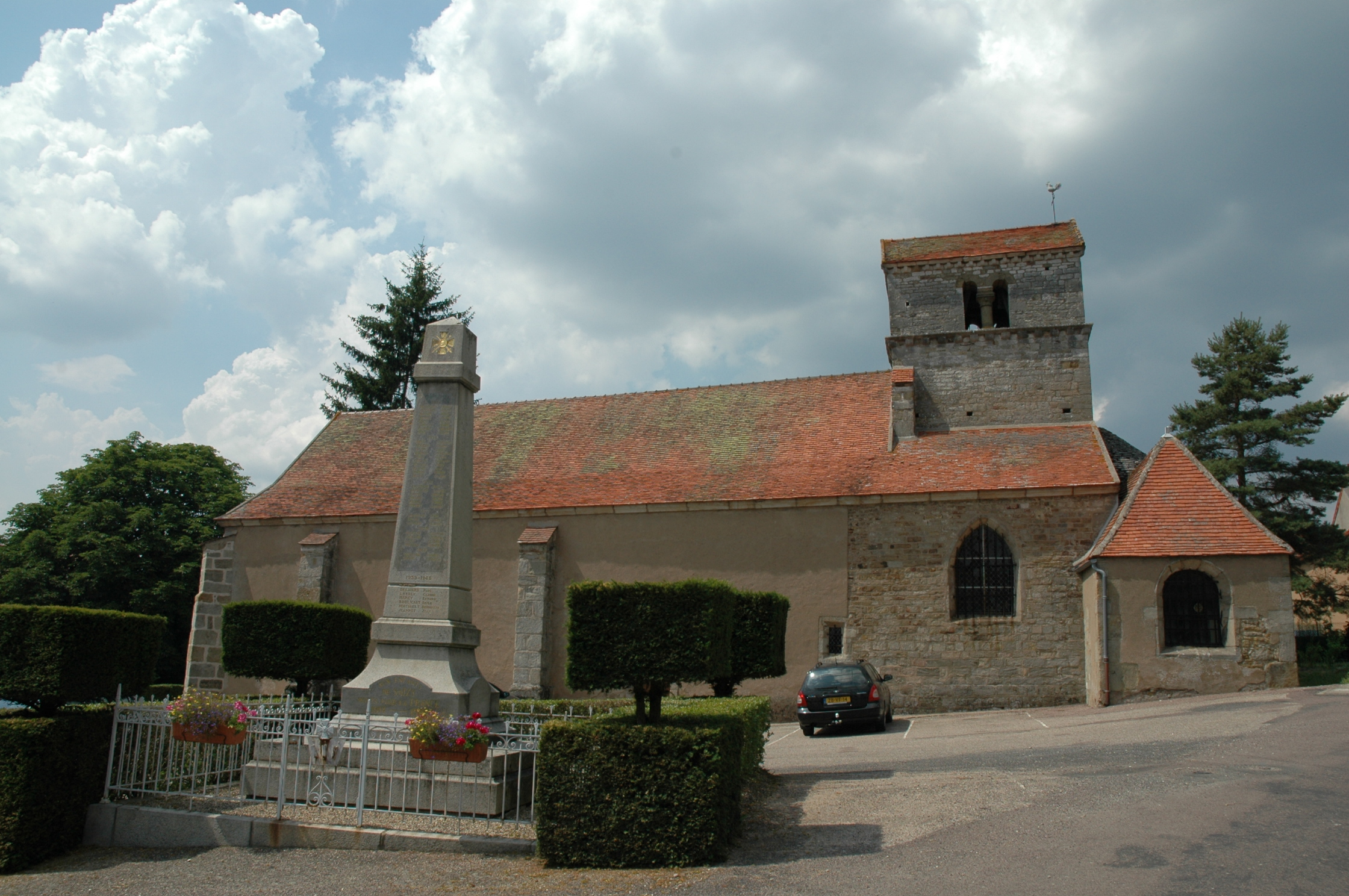
Saisy le Bourg

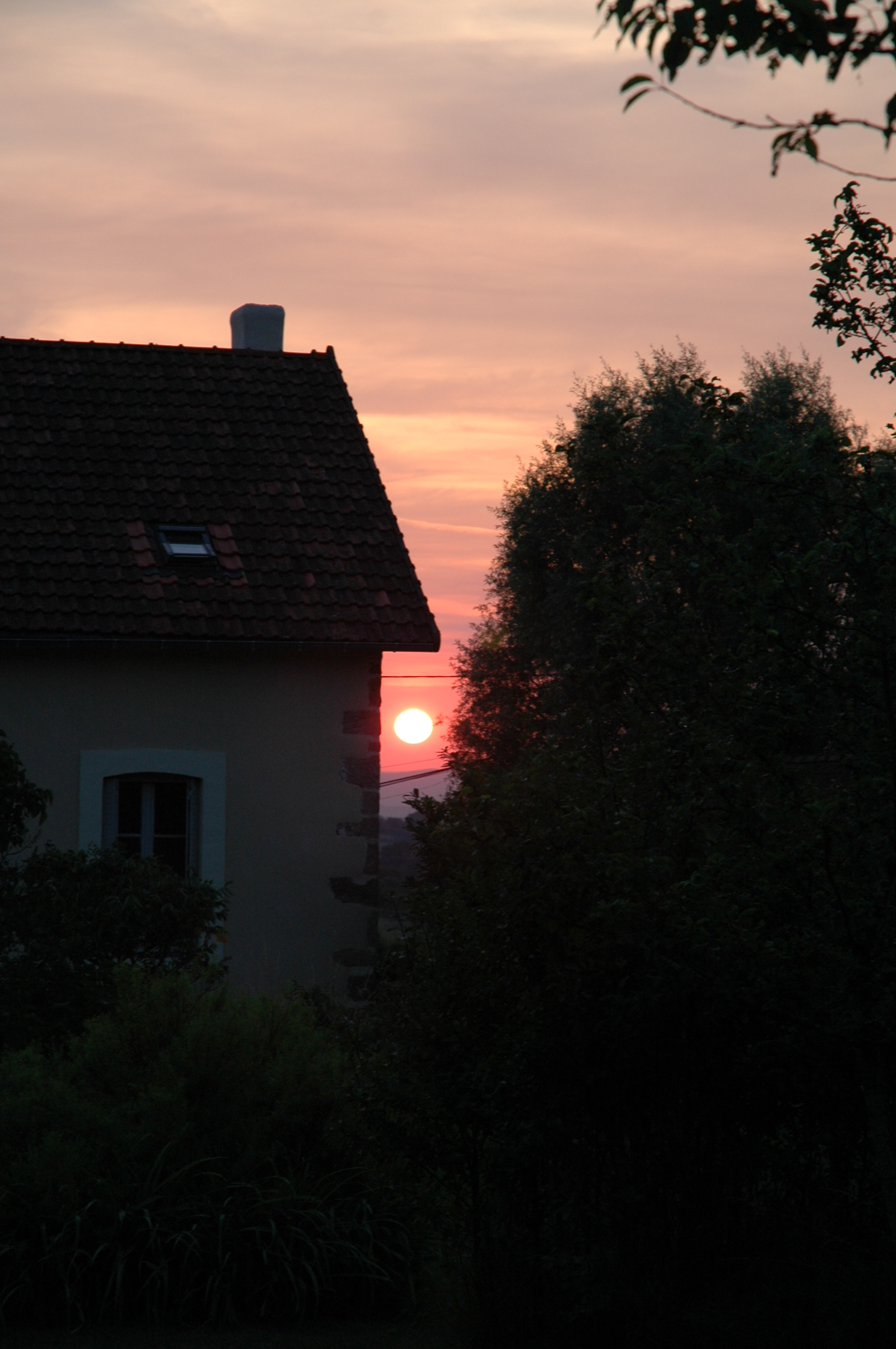
Another Sunset at Saisy

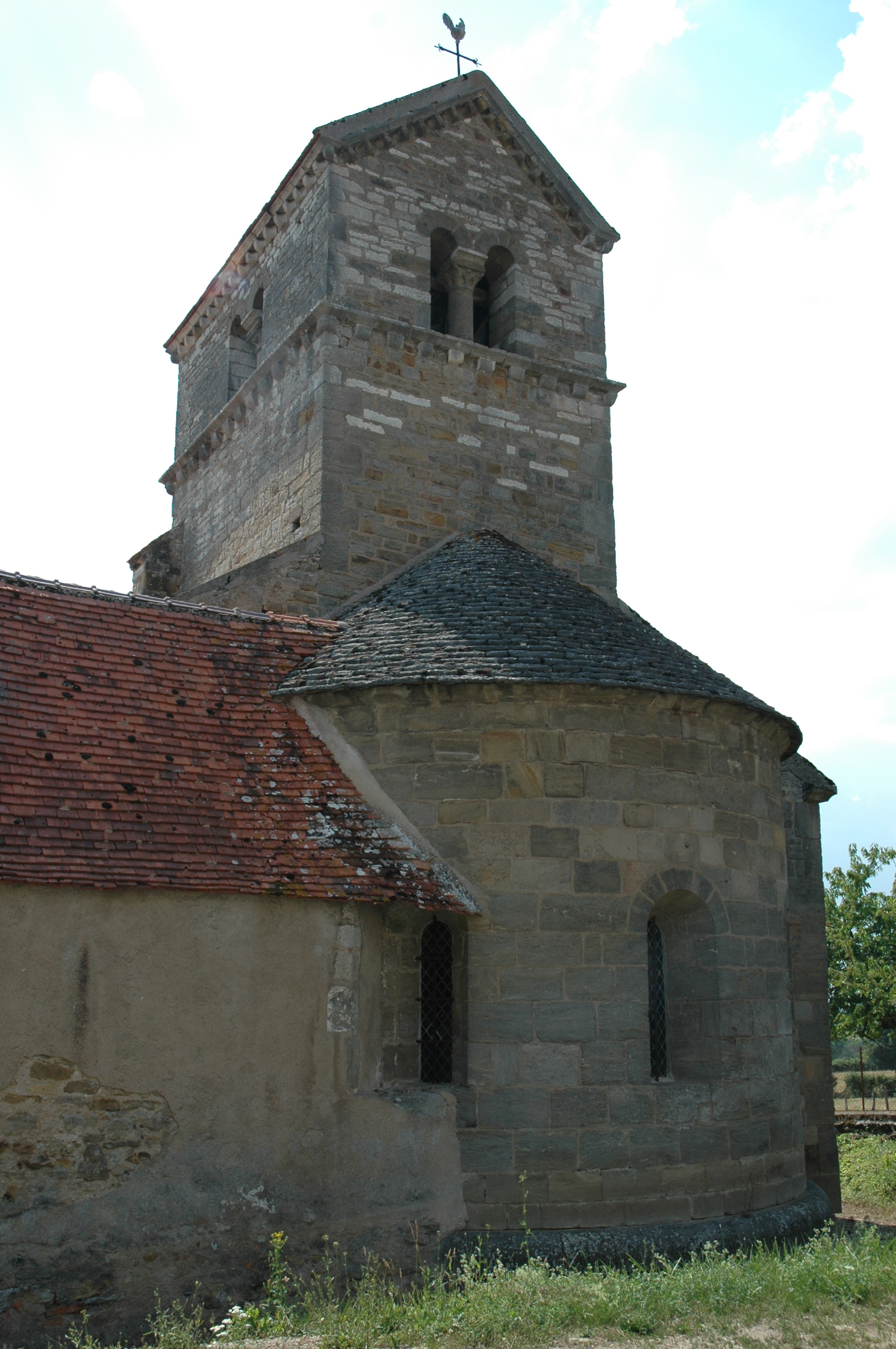
the Church at Saisy

The Madonna at Saisy

Holy Card for Saisy Statue

Holy Card for Saisy Statue

The View from the Statue at Sunset

The View from the Statue

Village Houses at Saisy
