= Le Forêt =

Le Forêt may refer to:

- La Forêt de Saisy
- "Le Forêt", song by composer André Caplet
