= Canton of Beaune =

Coordinates: 47.02°N 4.84°E

The canton of Beaune is an administrative division of the Côte-d'Or department, eastern France. It was created at the French canton reorganisation which came into effect in March 2015. Its seat is in Beaune.

It consists of the following communes:

1. Beaune
