= Nicolas Grozelier =

Nicolas Grozelier (17 August 1692, Beaune – 27 August 1778) was an 18th-century French fabulist.

== Biography ==
A French writer, Grozelier joined the Oratory of Saint Philip Neri in 1710, aged 18. There, he taught belles-lettres, philosophy and theology. He composed many poems and quite a number of small plays of his, almost always written in an easy and natural style, are quoted. A collection of his fables was published in six books in 1768.

== Works ==
- 1760: Fables nouvelles, divisées en six livres, et dédiées a monseigneur le duc de Bourgogne, À Paris, chez Desaint & Saillant
- 1768: Fables nouvelles, divisées en six livres, et dédiées a monseigneur le Dauphin, À Paris, chez Des Ventes de la Doué
- 1726–1730: Observations curieuses sur toutes les parties de la physique, extraites et recueillies des meilleurs mémoires, A. Cailleau
