= Lucien Jacob =

French politician (1930–2019)

Deputy of the French National Assembly
- In office 16 March 1986 – 14 May 1988
- Constituency: Côte-d'Or
- In office 6 May 1978 – 22 May 1981
- Preceded by: Jean-Philippe Lecat
- Succeeded by: François Patriat
- Constituency: Côte-d'Or's 3rd

Mayor of Échevronne
- In office 1977–2001
- Succeeded by: Jean-Marc Preney

Member of the General Council of Côte-d'Or for the Canton of Beaune-Nord
- In office 1992–2004
- Preceded by: Pierre Petitjean
- Succeeded by: Denis Thomas

Personal details
- Born: 3 July 1930 Beaune, France
- Died: 28 November 2019 (aged 89) Nuits-Saint-Georges, France
- Party: RPR
- Occupation: Winegrower

Lucien Jacob (3 July 1930 – 28 November 2019) was a French politician of the Rally for the Republic (RPR).

== Biography ==
A winegrower, mayor of Échevronne and general councillor of the canton of Beaune-Nord from 1992 to 2004.
