= The Annunciation, with Saint Emidius =

1486 painting by Carlo Crivelli

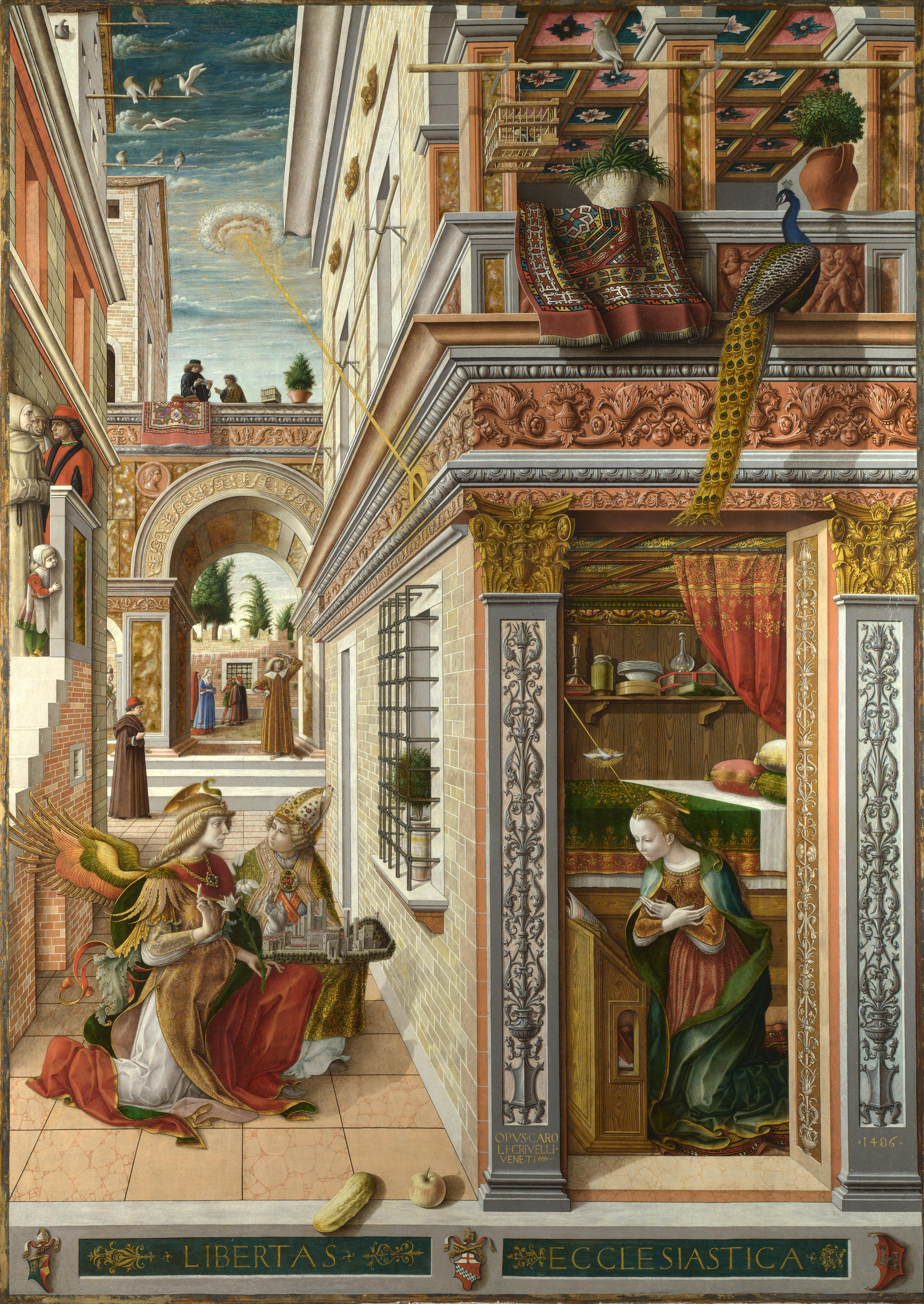
- Artist: Carlo Crivelli
- Year: 1486
- Type: Egg and oil on canvas
- Dimensions: 207 cm × 146.7 cm (81 in × 57.8 in)
- Location: National Gallery, London

The Annunciation, with Saint Emidius is an altarpiece by Italian artist Carlo Crivelli showing an artistic adaptation of the Annunciation. The Annunciation is a religious event described in the Bible which involves the archangel Gabriel appearing to the Virgin Mary and announcing a sacred message. This altarpiece was painted for the Church of SS. Annunziata in the Italian town of Ascoli Piceno, in the region of Marche, to celebrate the self-government granted to the town in 1482 by Pope Sixtus IV. Furthermore, this painting incorporates important religious symbols and subjects such as the archangel Gabriel, The Virgin Mary, Saint Emidius, and the Holy Spirit to convey the sacredness of the scene. Lastly, the architecture and clothes depicted in this painting, as well as the techniques used to create this painting, showcase that this is a Renaissance piece of art.

== Subject ==
The Annunciation is a key pivotal event within the Christian religion. In the painting archangel Gabriel descends from the heavens and informs the Virgin Mary that she is carrying God's child and will give birth to Jesus Christ. the Holy Spirit symbolizes the miraculous conception and is depicted as a ray of light that passes into the Virgin Mary. Subject matter that painters used when depicting the Annunciation can be drawn from the Gospel of Luke and the Apocryphal Gospels. By the fourteenth and fifteenth century Annunciation scenes commonly show the Virgin Mary as seated in an enclosed space reading, while the archangel Gabriel kneels before her, as in the painting. This Annunciation scene is distinctive because the artist has chosen to place a saint, St. Emidius, beside the archangel Gabriel.

== History ==
Carlo Crivelli moved from Venice to the Marches, near the port city of Ancona on the Adriatic Sea in 1458. Crivelli signed and dated this artwork by 1486, making this one of his earliest commissions since moving to the area. The altarpiece was made for the town of Ascoli Piceno, which neighbored the port city of Ancona and was meant to be housed in the city's church of the Santissima Annunciazione. Later on, the painting was removed to the Pinacoteca di Brera in Milan in 1811, but passed to Auguste-Louis de Sivry in 1820, and had reached England by the mid-19th century. It has been housed in the National Gallery in London since it was donated by Henry Labouchere, 1st Baron Taunton in 1864.

== Description ==
This specific altarpiece was made for the convent of the Observant Friars who were located near the Adriatic Sea in the town of Ascoli Piceno. The physical artwork itself is called a pala, which is an altarpiece that comes in one whole panel and does not disjoint or have other separate panels. This painting was created using a blend of egg tempera and oil paint on canvas, typical materials of the early Renaissance. He was also exposed to using these materials and techniques since both his father and brother were painters. This artwork by Crivelli is a great example of a quintessential Renaissance painting which depicts a biblical scene and uses elements of classical architecture mixed with Renaissance elements. One can see the use of columns and rounded arches, along with the incorporation of a lot of gold ornamentation.

=== Symbolism ===
Starting with the archangel Gabriel, he is in the foreground of the painting kneeled before the Virgin Mary. Gabriel is also accompanied by a kneeling St. Emidius who is the patron saint of the town of Ascoli Piceno and whom the painting is named after. St. Emidius is an important figure because he is known for performing many miracles, including curing the blind. He became the patron saint of the town after he was martyred in there in 303. Eventually, the bishop of Ascoli Piceno around the year 1000 had St. Emidius' relics transferred to a crypt within the city. In this painting, St. Emidius seems to be proudly showing the archangel Gabriel a detailed physical model of his town. This depiction of the Annunciation is peculiar since the archangel Gabriel is separated from the Virgin Mary by a piece of architecture and St. Emidius is kneeled alongside Gabriel while he announces his divine message to Mary.

Despite this, Gabriel's message is still received as one can see the appearance of the Holy Spirit in the upper left-hand corner. The Holy Spirit is breaking through the clouds and penetrating the building where Mary is kneeling. The light ray from the sky represents Mary receiving Jesus Christ into her womb by the Holy Spirit. The archangel Gabriel is also holding a pair of white lilies which are meant to symbolize that Virgin Mary's purity, virginity, and spirituality. This is important to represent since she will by the mother of Christ and needs to be seen as sin free and pure as possible. The closed passage into the depth at the left and the flask of pure water in Mary's bedroom conventionally refer to Mary's virginity as well. In front of Mary where she is kneeling, there is an open book that she is reading which is believed to be Isaiah's prophecy. This prophecy entails the birth of the Messiah and coincides with Gabriel's arrival.

There are many figures in the background of the painting which serve to add a feeling of everyday life and be a witness to this sacred moment. The man in the background behind St. Emidius as well as the small child to the left on top of the stairs, seem to be the only people who notice the Holy Spirit descending upon the Virgin Mary. The two figures on top of the stairs, left of the archangel Gabriel and Saint Emidius, are believed to be Franciscan friars and the patrons of Crivelli's The Annunciation, with Saint Emidius. Moving towards the upper right-hand corner, there are a variety of birds including a peacock and goldfinch within a cage. Both of these birds represent the Passion of Christ as well as his Resurrection. The peacock also symbolizes associated immortality, because it was believed that its flesh never decayed. In the same area as the birds, an Oriental carpet also adorns the loggia on the first floor of Mary's house. Crivelli was most likely exposed to oriental and Middle Eastern elements since he studied early Renaissance art in Padua. The Italian city of Padua has many Middle Eastern and Byzantine influences which is evident when viewing the construction of buildings within the city.

The bottom portion of the painting features the coats of arms of Pope Sixtus IV and the local bishop, Prospero Caffarelli. The Latin words libertas ecclesiastica (church liberty) refer to the self-government of Ascoli Piceno under the general oversight of the Catholic Church. Also at the bottom of the painting there seems to be a randomly placed cucumber and apple. The apple in the foreground represents the forbidden fruit and the associated fall of man. The cucumber symbolizes the promise of resurrection and redemption.

=== Architecture ===
The architectural styles represented within the painting are a combination of classical elements and Renaissance embellishments. There are rounded Roman arches, white columns with gilded capitals, elaborate entablatures designed with intricate friezes, and coffered ceilings. The architecture seems to be made out of various colors of brick, veined marble, and wood. Crivelli signed and dated his painting on the outside of Mary's house at the bottom of the Corinthian pilasters. The inscriptions at the bottom read "OPVS-CAROLI-CRIVELLI-VENETI-1486".

=== Clothing ===
The three subjects with the most striking and luxurious clothing are the archangel Gabriel, St. Emidius, and the Virgin Mary. Mary, Gabriel, and St. Emidius are all heavily adorned with gold and silver elements which include brocades, precious gems, and jewelry. Their clothing is also painted using rich tones of green, red, and orange, as well as surrounding areas that contain objects or are draped with fabric. The modest clothing that the Virgin Mary is wearing is from the fifteenth-century, depicted in a richly colored tight bodice detailed with gold flora and foliage and jewels. She also has on white underdressing which becomes exposed from her slashed sleeves. On her head she is wearing a jeweled coronet and is covered with an elegant cloak. The archangel Gabriel is clothed in heavy drapery and wears shoulder coverings that are reminiscent of armor. He is also wearing a large medallion around his neck and a coronet that is bejeweled as well as a gilded halo. St. Emidius wears the attire of a bishop but has one of the most heavily jeweled, embroidered, and gilded outfits compared to Gabriel and Mary. His bishop's mitre is adorned with precious gems and he also has a large jeweled clasp to connect his lavish golden cope.

== Art Style ==
Being born in Venice, Carlo Crivelli absorbed many artistic styles of painters around him, that being to create striking paintings that incorporated vibrant colors with clear strong lines. There was also a slight influence of the Netherlandish manuscript style in his paintings. This can be seen with his use of meticulous detail, realistic depictions of people and objects, rich colors, and a focus on religious themes. When Crivelli left Venice and moved to the Marches, he reinvented his own type of Adriatic style painting. In this painting Crivelli showcases his use of bold vibrant colors along with the implementation of clear strong lines. The use of these techniques create an extremely detailed painting with a lot of small details and intricacies. Crivelli created this artwork as an altarpiece with a single unified surface which allowed him to display his understanding and mastery of linear perspective setting his vanishing point in the upper third and halfway across the lower left quadrant, (Lecture to Manchester Literary & Philosophical Society) as well as his appreciation for detail. He implements and utilizes background subjects and objects to create shadows and depth . In doing so, it creates the sense of a real space within the painting. In the Virgin Mary's house, Crivelli places many objects around the room such as the books above her head, a candle, and a vase. The way he paints these objects display his skills of foreshortening and casting shadows. The apple and cucumber at the very bottom of the painting are an illusion that Crivelli liked to use in order to confuse the viewer. Both fruits look like they are placed inside and outside of the painting because of their shadows. This cleverly makes the painting look flat and three-dimensional at the same time.

== Interpretation/ Scholarly Debate ==
In fringe theories, the halo of the Holy Spirit on the painting is sometimes interpreted as a UFO. According to historian Massimo Polidoro, the circular form in the sky is "a vortex of angels in the clouds, another frequent representation of God in Medieval and Renaissance sacred works of art". Polidoro calls the UFO explanation, "reinterpreting with the eyes of twenty-first-century Europeans the product of other cultures".

== See also ==
- Ancient astronauts #Medieval and Renaissance art
