= Changey (Saisy) =

Village in Burgundy, France

Coordinates: 46°57′40″N 4°34′28″E

Changey is a village in Burgundy, France. It is part of the Commune of Saisy in the Saône-et-Loire département.
