= Hôtel de Ville, Beaune =

Town hall in Beaune, France

Hôtel de Ville
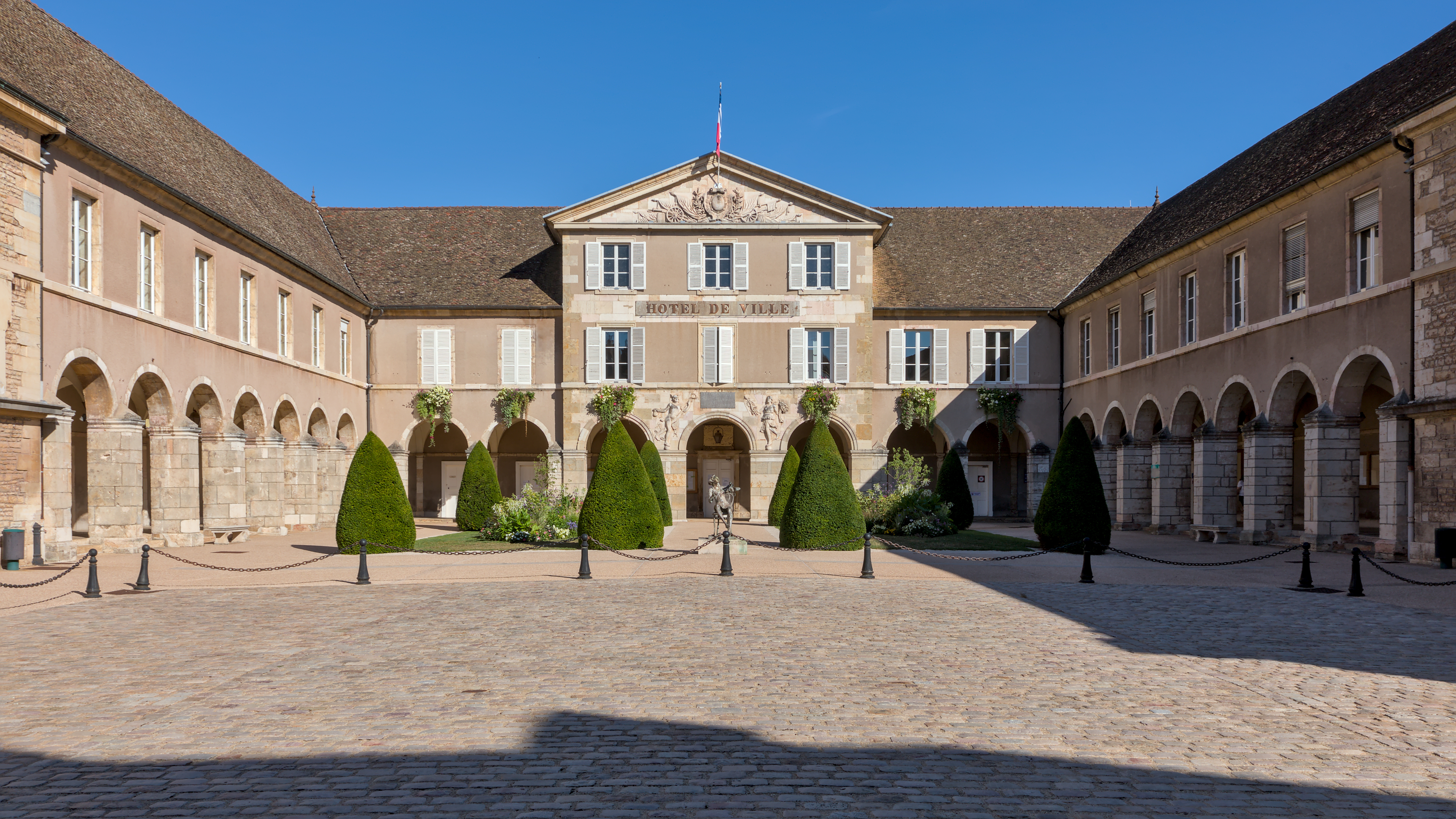
- The main frontage of the Hôtel de Ville in August 2025

General information
- Type: City hall
- Architectural style: Neoclassical style
- Location: Beaune, France
- Coordinates: 47.0262°N 4.8397°E
- Completed: c.1700

Design and construction
- Architect: Jacques Guichard

Monument historique
- Official name: Couvent des Ursulines (ancien)
- Type: Inscrit
- Designated: 1946
- Reference no.: PA00112106

The Hôtel de Ville (French pronunciation: [otɛl də vil], City Hall) is a municipal building in Beaune, Côte-d'Or, in eastern France, standing on Rue de l'Hôtel de Ville. It was designated a monument historique by the French government in 1946.

== History ==
One of the galleries

The first town hall in Beaune was a medieval building on Place Monge dating from the late 13th century. The design involved a symmetrical main frontage of three bays facing onto the street. There were bartizans at the corners and an octagonal belfry at roof level.

In the late 18th century, after finding the old town hall too cramped, the town council decided to move to the Couvent des Ursulines (Convent of the Ursulines). The convent had originally been established in a row of houses on what is now Rue de l'Hôtel de Ville by nuns from Autun in May 1626. At the end of the century, after finding their existing premises inadequate, the nuns decided to commission a purpose-built building. The foundation stone was laid by the mother superior, Marie de Sayvre, also known as Marie de Saint Michel, and by a local dignitary, Bénigne Lebelin, on 6 July 1697. The building was designed in the neoclassical style, built in ashlar stone and was completed around 1700.

After the French Revolution, the convent was seized by the state, the nuns were driven out, and the building was handed over to the town council for use as a town hall. Following a major fire in 1815, the building was given a new façade by the building contractor, Pierre Champenois, to a design by the architect, Jacques Guichard: the work was completed in 1818. The complex was laid out with a main block of seven bays facing onto the street, with two wings of seven bays each, which were projected forward. The central section of three bays, which was slightly projected forward, featured three arched openings with moulded surrounds on the ground floor, three casement windows on each of the first and second floors and a pediment above. The pediment contained fine carvings by Louis Bonnet in the tympanum. The right wing (south wing) was extended forward to accommodate a reception hall in 1828, and the left wing (north wing) was extended forward to accommodate a library and a museum in 1850.

The Museum of Fine Arts, which had been established in the north wing of the town hall in 1850, relocated to the former chapel in the south wing in 1871. The museum moved again to the Porte Marie de Bourgogne, where it was collocated with the local tourist office, in 2005. A war memorial, in the form of a female figure standing in front of an obelisk which was intended to commemorate the lives of local people who had died in the Franco-Prussian War of 1870, was created by the sculptor, Henri Chapu, and installed in the courtyard in front of the town hall in 1896. It was removed to the Place du Souvenir Français in 1954.
