= Santissima Annunziata, Ascoli Piceno =

Roman Catholic church in Ascoli Piceno, Italy

Santissima Annunziata
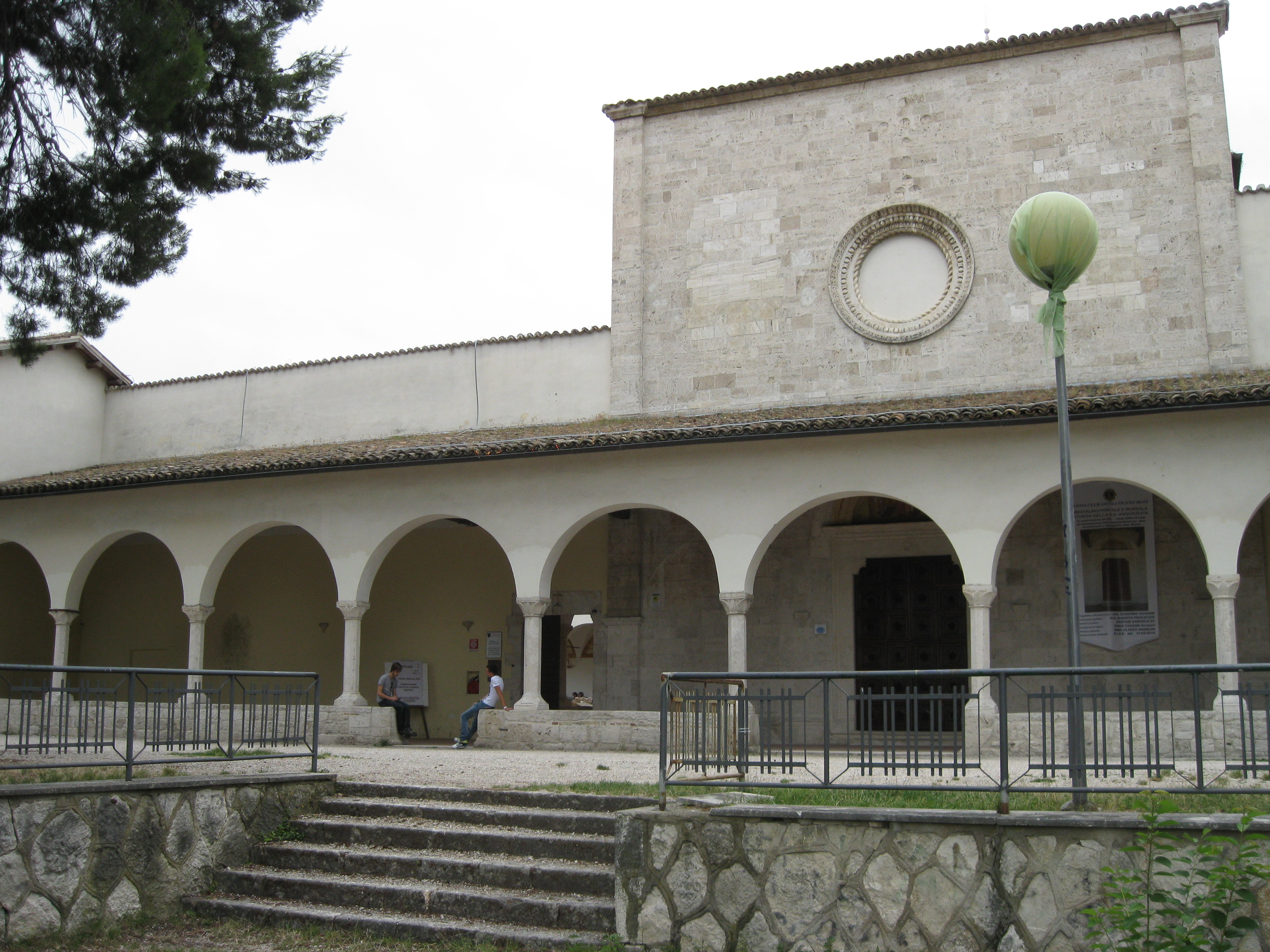
- Facade and eight-arch portico at the entrance to the church.
- Santissima Annunziata
- Location: Ascoli Piceno, Marche
- Country: Italy
- Denomination: Catholic Church

Santissima Annunziata was a Roman Catholic church dedicated to the Annunciation in Ascoli Piceno, Italy. It is located in the Parco dell'Annunziata. The whole complex was the result of extensions to an original 13th century set of buildings.

== History ==
The complex on the site was built on the 'Grotte dell'Annunziata', ancient Roman remains at the top of the Colle dell'Annunziata. It originally housed a hospital until 1250, when Peter of Verona handed it over to Augustinian nuns. These nuns built the small church and the earliest and largest of the two surviving cloisters in the 14th century - that cloister is square in plan and surrounded by a portico of octagonal pilasters supporting a loggiato

The complex was handed over to nuns of the order of saint Monica in 1444 and then put under the oversight of the Franciscans in Ascoli in 1481. For a long time, starting in 1482, the people of the city processed to the church every 25 March in memory of pope Sixtus IV granting the city 'Libertà Ecclesiastica'. At the centre of the smaller cloister is a 15th century well.

A 17th century local historian, Sebastiano Andreantonelli, described the complex as the "seventh convent in Ascoli", still run in his time by the Franciscans. In 1882 the complex buildings were made the headquarters of the first 'Practical School of Agriculture of Italy' and then in 1924 of the Scuola Media Agraria. In 1933 they were converted into an orphanage run by the Sisters of Charity and renamed the Conservatorio Regina Margherita. The complex's buildings were then abandoned for a long period but now house the Scuola di Architettura e Design, Unicam.

== Art ==
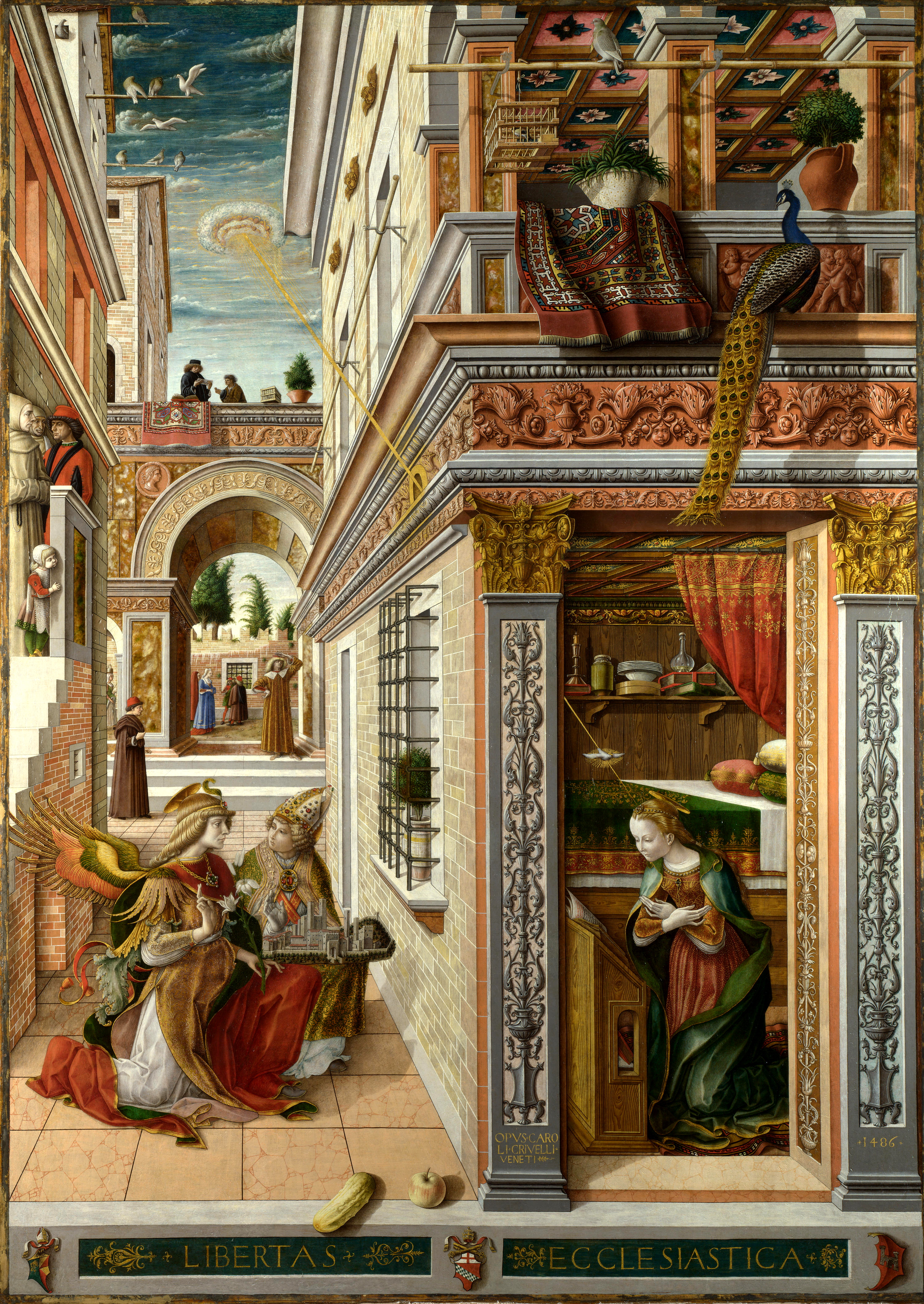
The Annunciation, with Saint Emidius.

The church originally housed The Annunciation, with Saint Emidius by Crivelli (National Gallery, London), Blessed James of the Marches (Louvre) and Polyptych with the Virgin and Saints (present location unknown). A 1519 lunette mural of Christ's Climb to Cavalry by Cola dell'Amatrice hangs on the west side of what was the refectory The work belongs to his early period and was restored in the first half of the 19th century after damage by the Napoleonic army.

== Bibliography (in Italian) ==
- Sebastiano Andreantonelli, Historiae Asculanae, Padova, Typis Matthaei de Cadorinis, 1673.
- Giambattista Carducci, Su le memorie e i monumenti di Ascoli nel Piceno, Fermo, Saverio Del Monte, 1853.
- Antonio Rodilossi, Ascoli Piceno città d'arte, Modena, "Stampa & Stampa" Gruppo Euroarte Gattei, Grafiche STIG, 1983.
- Sebastiano Andreantonelli, Storia di Ascoli, Traduzione di Paola Barbara Castelli e Alberto Cettoli – Indici e note di Giannino Gagliardi, Ascoli Piceno, G. e G. Gagliardi Editori, Centro Stampa Piceno, giugno 2007.
- Erminia Tosti Luna, Un'antica torre da valorizzare in Flash Ascoli - mensile di vita Picena, N. 367, anno 2008, p. 20.
- Giuseppe Marinelli, Dizionario Toponomastico Ascolano - La Storia, i Costumi, i Personaggi nelle Vie della Città, Ascoli Piceno, D'Auria Editrice, 2009.
