= La Vesvre =

Village in Burgundy, France

Coordinates: 46°57′45″N 4°31′57″E

La Vesvre de Saisy is a village in Burgundy. It is part of the Commune of Saisy in the département of Saône-et-Loire, France.

Morning mist at La Vesvre
