= Beaune =

Subprefecture and commune in Bourgogne-Franche-Comté, France

Beaune Beane (Burgundian)
- Subprefecture and commune
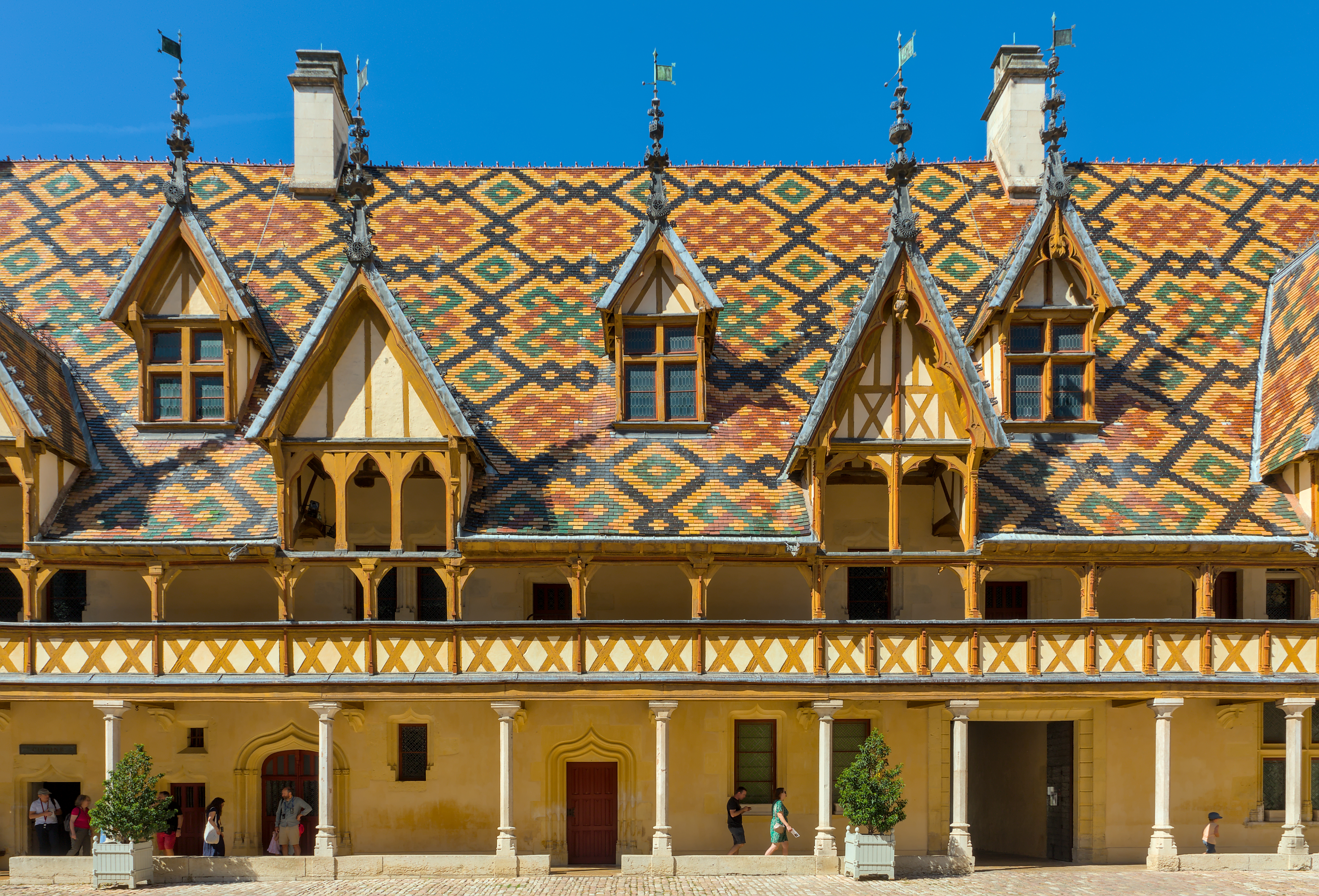
- Hospices de Beaune

- Coat of arms
- Location of Beaune
- Location within France Location within Bourgogne-Franche-Comté
- Coordinates: 47°01′30″N 4°50′23″E
- Country: France
- Region: Bourgogne-Franche-Comté
- Department: Côte-d'Or
- Arrondissement: Beaune
- Canton: Beaune
- Intercommunality: CA Beaune Côte et Sud

Government
  - Mayor (2026–2032): Pierre Bolze
- Area^{1}: 31.30 km^{2} (12.08 sq mi)
- Elevation: 219 m (719 ft)
- Highest elevation: 407 m (1,335 ft)
- Lowest elevation: 193 m (633 ft)
- Population (2023): 20,352
  - Density: 650.2/km^{2} (1,684/sq mi)
- Time zone: UTC+01:00 (CET)
  - Summer (DST): UTC+02:00 (CEST)
- INSEE/Postal code: 21054 /21200
- ^{1} French Land Register data, which excludes lakes, ponds, glaciers > 1 km^{2} (0.386 sq mi or 247 acres) and river estuaries.

Beaune (French pronunciation: [bon]; in Burgundian: Beane) is a town in eastern France and wine capital of Burgundy, in the Côte-d'Or department. It is between Lyon and Dijon. Beaune is a hub of Burgundy wine production and business.

The town is surrounded by the wine villages like Meursault and Puligny Montrachet, while the facilities and cellars of producers, large and small, are in the historic center of Beaune, as they have been since Roman times. It is an ancient town on a plain by the hills of the Côte d'Or, with features from pre-Roman and Roman eras through the medieval and Renaissance periods.

Beaune is a walled city, with much of the battlements, ramparts, and moat having survived in good condition. The central "old town" within the walls is extensive. Historically Beaune is intimately connected with the Dukes of Burgundy.

Attractions include the 15th-century Hospices de Beaune, in the town center. Other landmarks in Beaune include the old market (les Halles), the Beffroi (clock tower), and the collegiate church of Notre Dame. Beaune is the main center of the region's "Burgundian tile" polychrome Renaissance roofing style. Because of its historical importance in wine production and the system of terroir in the region, the town of Beaune was inscribed on the UNESCO World Heritage List in 2015 as part of the Climats, terroirs of Burgundy site.

== Origin, geography and climate ==
The name "Beaune" derives from the Latinised Gaulish word "Belena", which was the name of a spring around which the settlement was established. That name in turn is derived from "Belen" or "Belenos", a god of fast-flowing water. A Roman fort was built there in the first century A.D. and it was already a wine-growing region in the 13th century.

The town is served by a small river, the "Bouzaise" (or "Bouzaize") of which the source is in a public park on the north-east edge of town.

Beaune has a semi-continental climate with an oceanic influence, with frequent rains in each season (though autumn has the most and summer the least) and frequent weather changes.

== History ==
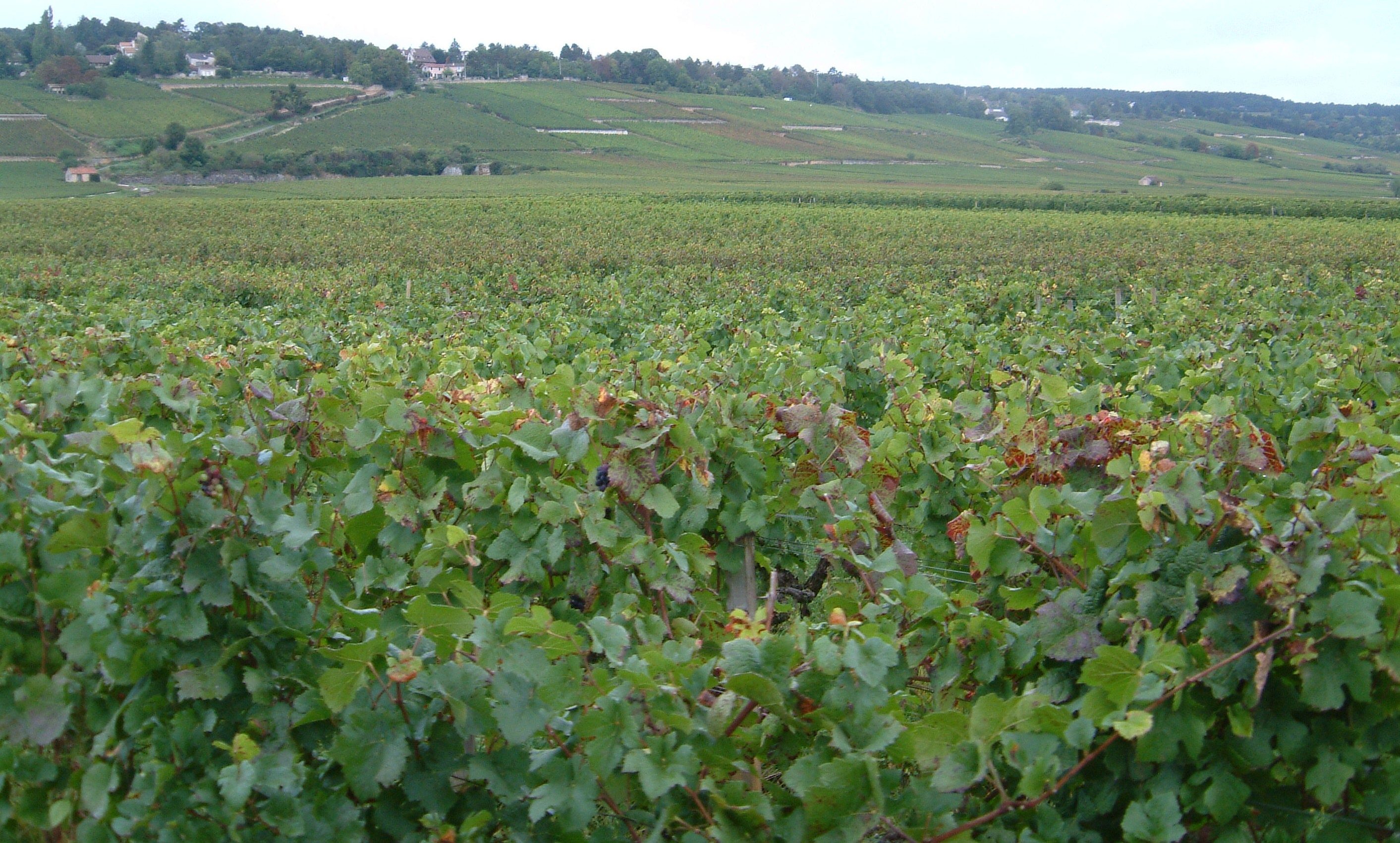
Vineyards on the outskirts of Beaune

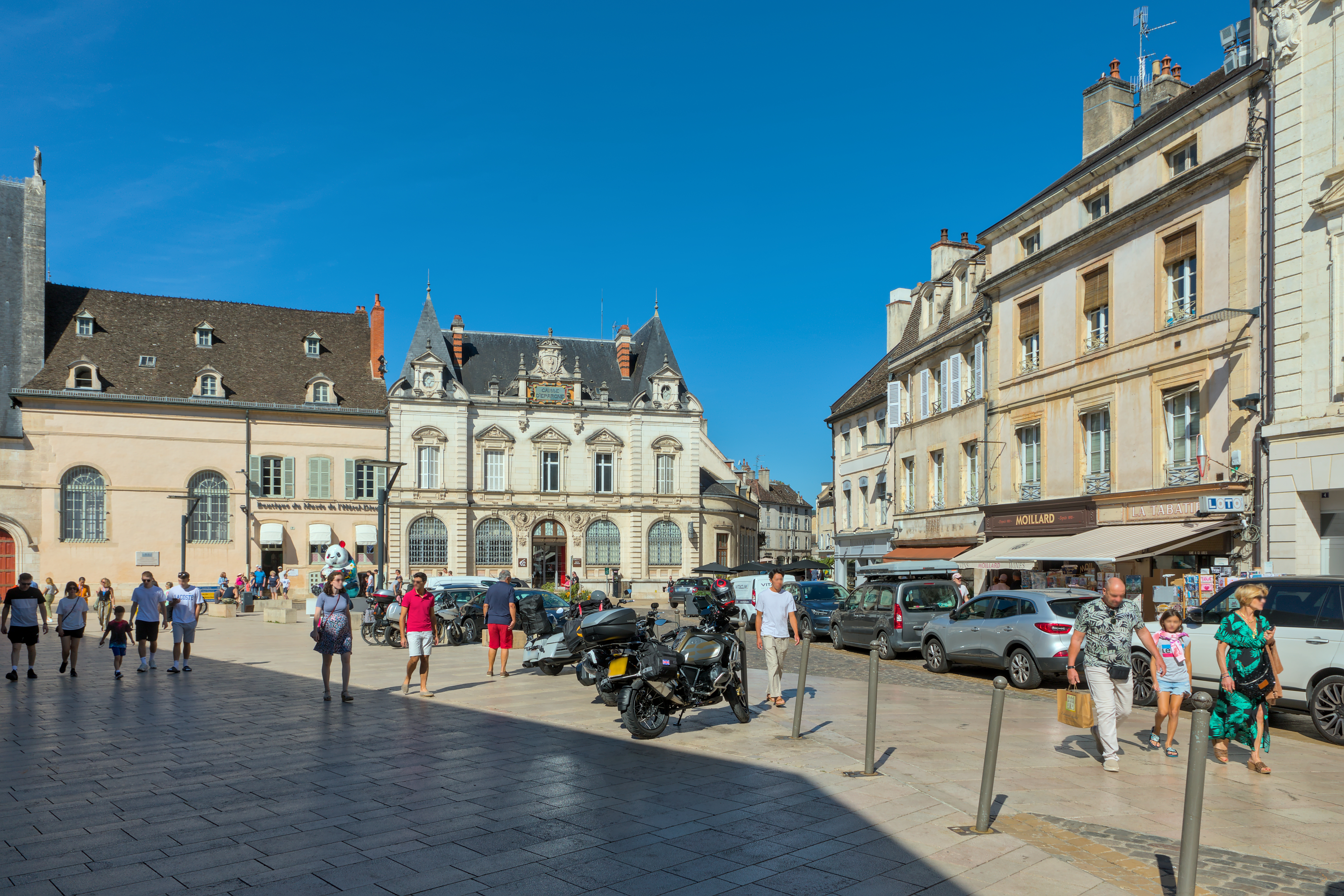
Place de la Halle in Beaune, France

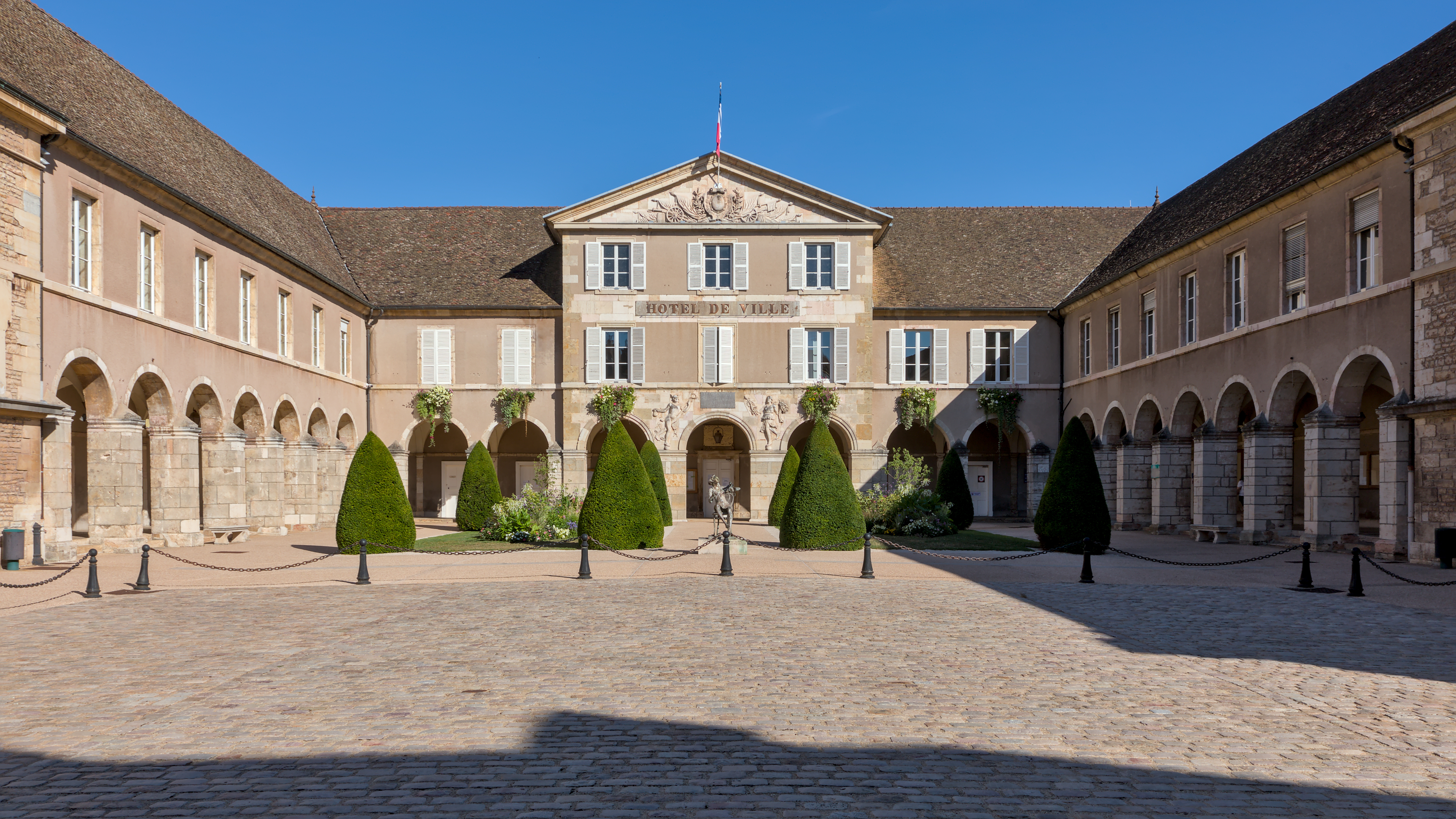
The Hôtel de Ville

Founded in 1442 by Nicolas Rolin, chancellor of the Duke of Burgundy, who was encouraged to do so by his wife, Guigone de Salins, the Hospices are a charity running hospitals and other services for the needy. Thanks to donations from benefactors, they own vineyards in Burgundy. The Hôtel de Ville is a former convent completed in around 1700.

At the end of the First World War, the American Expeditionary Forces University was established in Beaune under the leadership of Brigadier General Robert I. Rees, complete with its own chapter of Phi Beta Kappa. Faculty included Walter M. Chandler, a Progressive Party member and, later, a Republican Party member of the U.S. House of Representatives from the State of New York.

Beaune is one of the wine towns in the Côte de Beaune section of the Burgundy wine region. It is the home of Beaune wine. Although Beaune itself does not have a Grand cru named for it, it is the hub of the region's wine business, as many of Burgundy's major négociants are here. Beaune hosts an annual charity wine auction on behalf of the Hospices de Beaune. It is on the route des Grands Crus which is a road that runs through the vineyards, north from Beaune to Gevrey Chambertin and Nuits-Saint-Georges and south to Nolay, Saisy and Autun. The appellation d'origine contrôlée (AOC) Beaune was created in 1936.

Technically Beaune is a commune in eastern France, a sub-prefecture of department 21, the Côte-d'Or department, in the Bourgogne-Franche-Comté region.

== Population ==
Historical population

Year	Pop.	±% p.a.
1793	10,114	—
1800	8,344	−2.71%
1806	9,298	+1.82%
1821	9,947	+0.45%
1831	9,908	−0.04%
1836	10,678	+1.51%
1841	10,585	−0.17%
1846	11,362	+1.43%
1851	10,969	−0.70%
1856	10,453	−0.96%
1861	10,715	+0.50%
1866	10,907	+0.36%
1872	11,176	+0.41%
1876	11,421	+0.54%
1881	12,038	+1.06%
1886	12,146	+0.18%
1891	12,470	+0.53%
1896	13,726	+1.94%
1901	13,887	+0.23%

Year	Pop.	±% p.a.
1906	13,540	−0.50%
1911	13,409	−0.19%
1921	11,661	−1.39%
1926	11,990	+0.56%
1931	11,862	−0.21%
1936	12,161	+0.50%
1946	11,990	−0.14%
1954	13,175	+1.19%
1962	15,367	+1.94%
1968	16,874	+1.57%
1975	19,060	+1.76%
1982	20,207	+0.84%
1990	21,289	+0.65%
1999	21,923	+0.33%
2007	22,012	+0.05%
2012	21,806	−0.19%
2017	21,031	−0.72%
2023	20,352	−0.55%

Source: EHESS and INSEE (1968-2023)

== Notable people ==
- Louis Chevrolet (1878–1941), race car driver, co-founder of the Chevrolet Motor Car Company, co-founder of the Frontenac Motor Corporation with brothers Gaston and Arthur
- Arthur Chevrolet (1884–1946), race car driver and co-founder of the Frontenac Motor Corporation with brothers Louis and Gaston
- Gaston Chevrolet (1892–1920), 1920 Indianapolis 500 winner and 1920 AAA National Champion race car driver, co-founder of the Frontenac Motor Corporation with brothers Louis and Arthur
- Nicolas Grozelier (1692–1778), 18th-century French fabulist
- Lucien Jacob (1930–2019), politician
- Bruno Latour (1947–2022), anthropologist and an influential theorist in the field of science and technology studies
- Étienne-Jules Marey (1830–1904), scientist and chronophotographer, a pioneer of photography and cinema
- Gaspard Monge (1746–1818), mathematician and inventor of descriptive geometry
- Enzo Peugeot (born 2005), racing driver
- Félix Ziem (1821–1911), painter in the style of the Barbizon School
- Léna Grandveau (born 2003), French handball player

== Twin towns ==
Beaune is twinned with:

- Nantucket, Massachusetts, United States, since 2006
- Bensheim, Hessen, Germany, since 1960
- Malmedy, Liège Province, Belgium, since 1962
- Krems an der Donau, Lower Austria, Austria, since 1976
- Kōshū, Yamanashi, Japan, since 1976

== Gallery ==
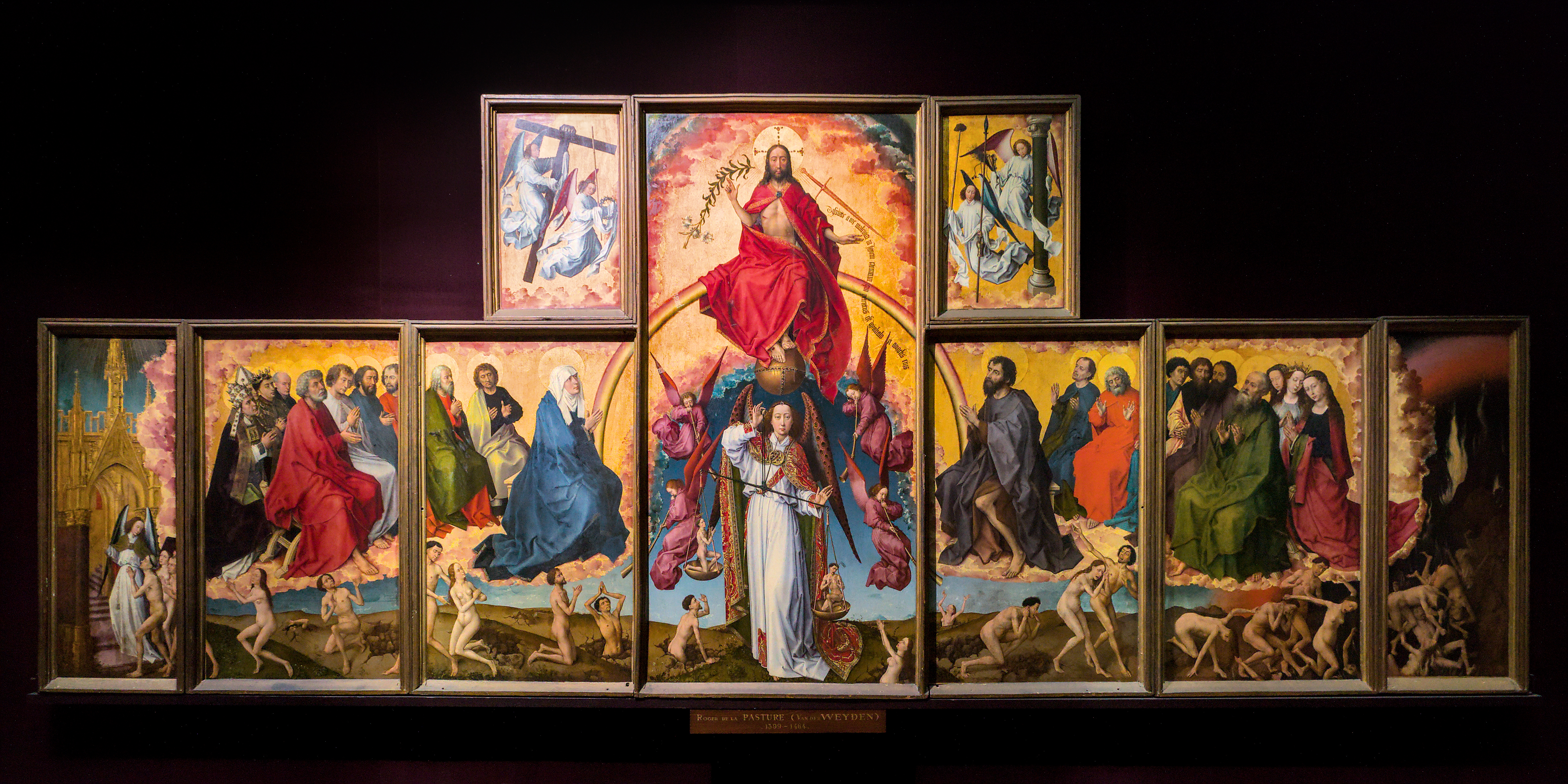
Beaune Altarpiece, Hôtel-Dieu, Beaune

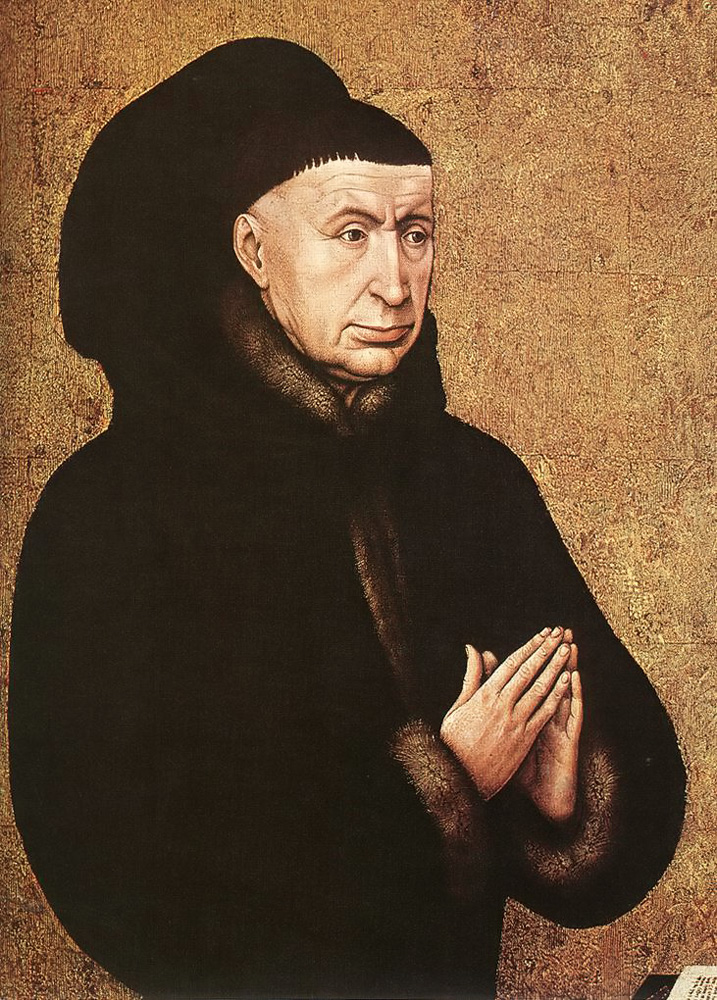
Nicolas Rolin, founder of the Hôtel-Dieu, Beaune

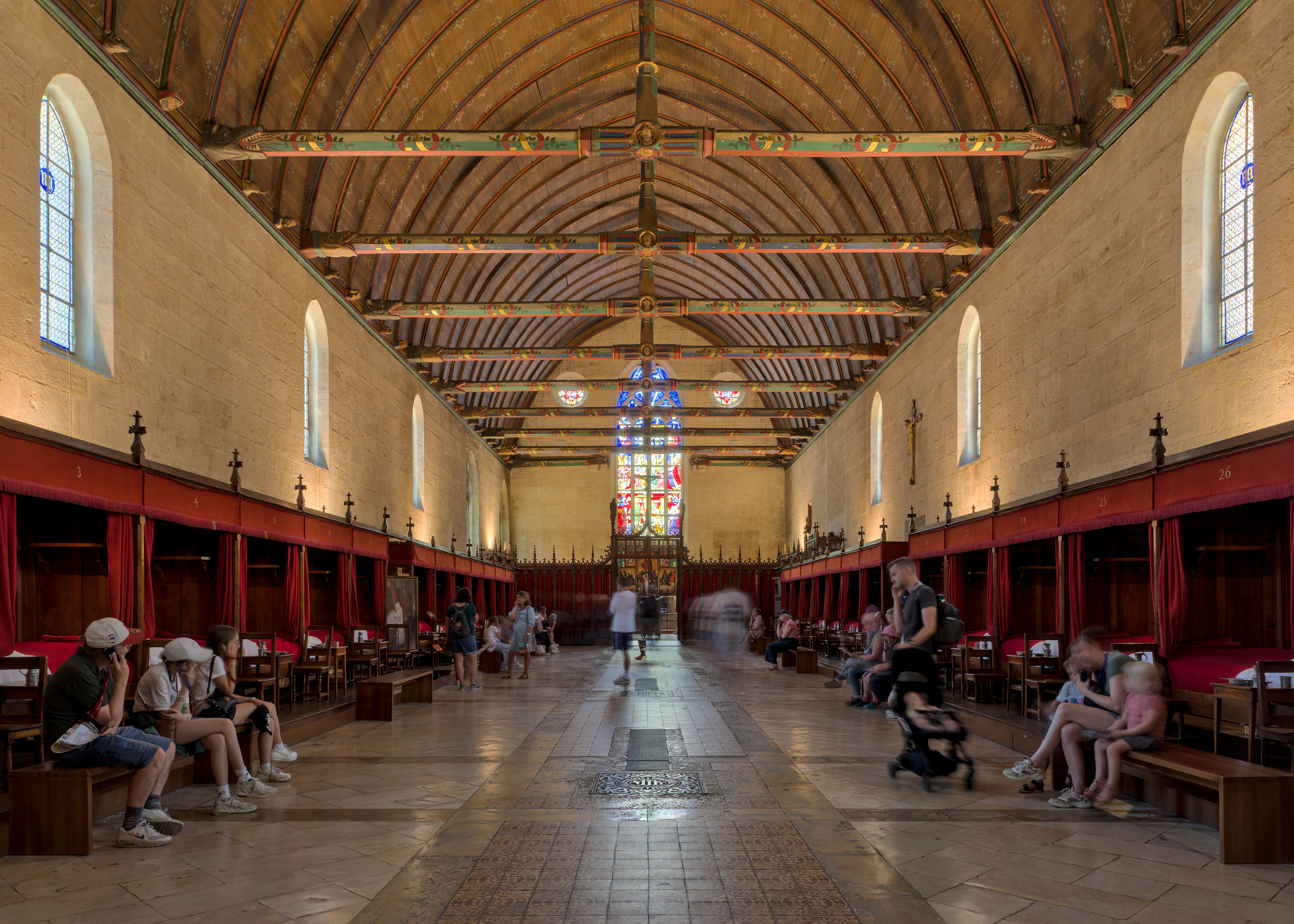
"Salle des Pôvres", Hôtel-Dieu, Beaune

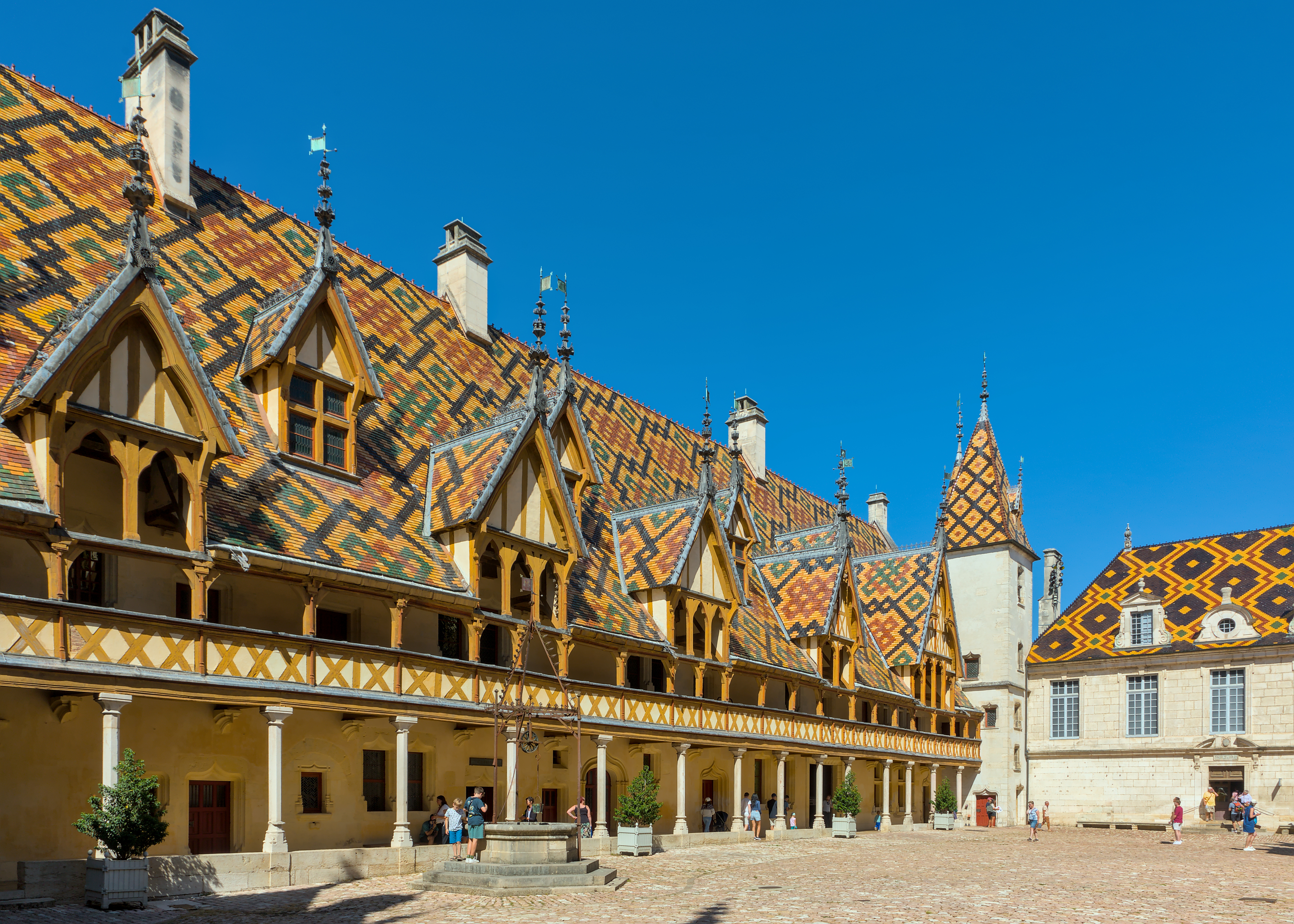
Hôtel-Dieu, Beaune

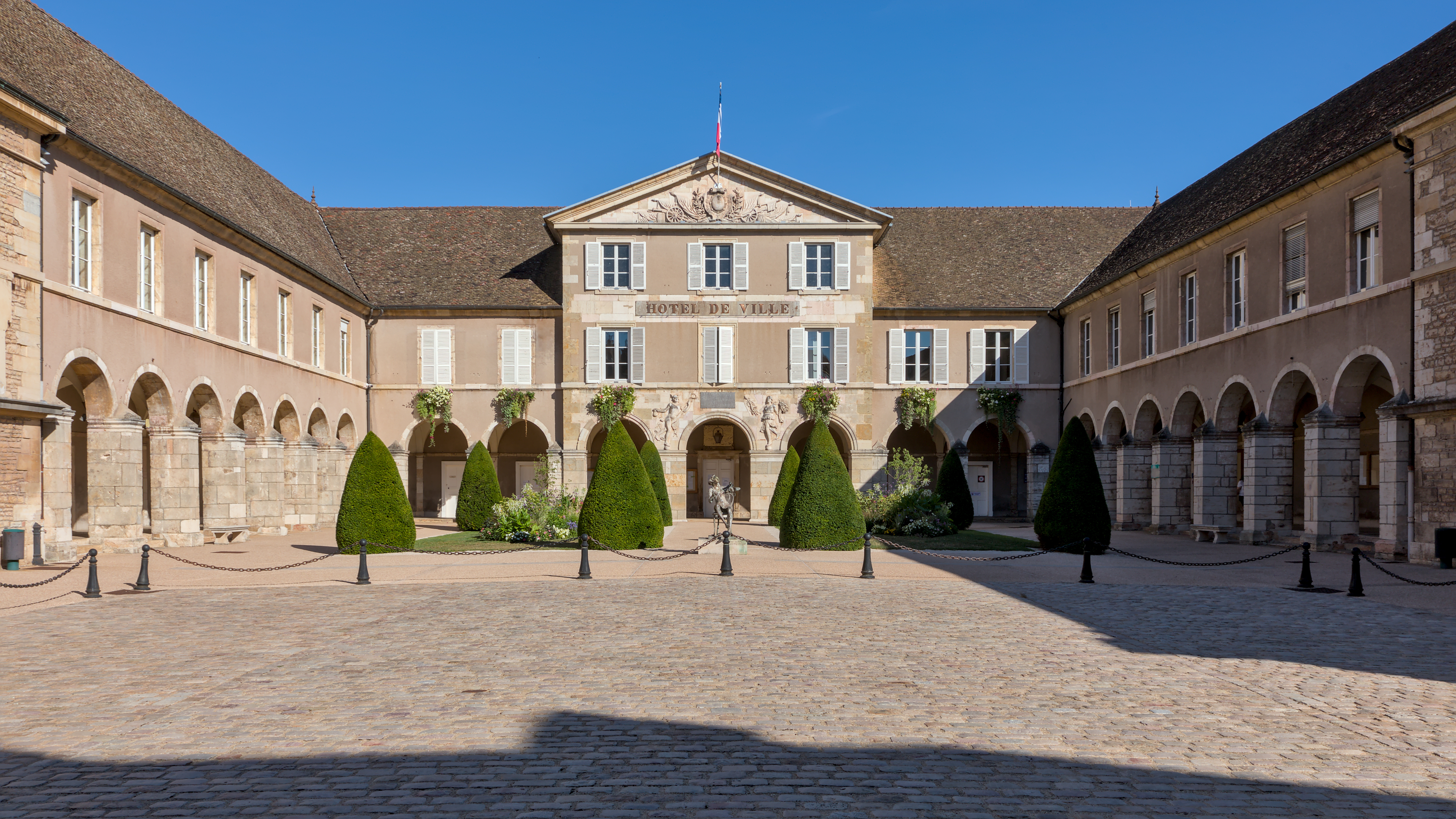
Beaune City Hall

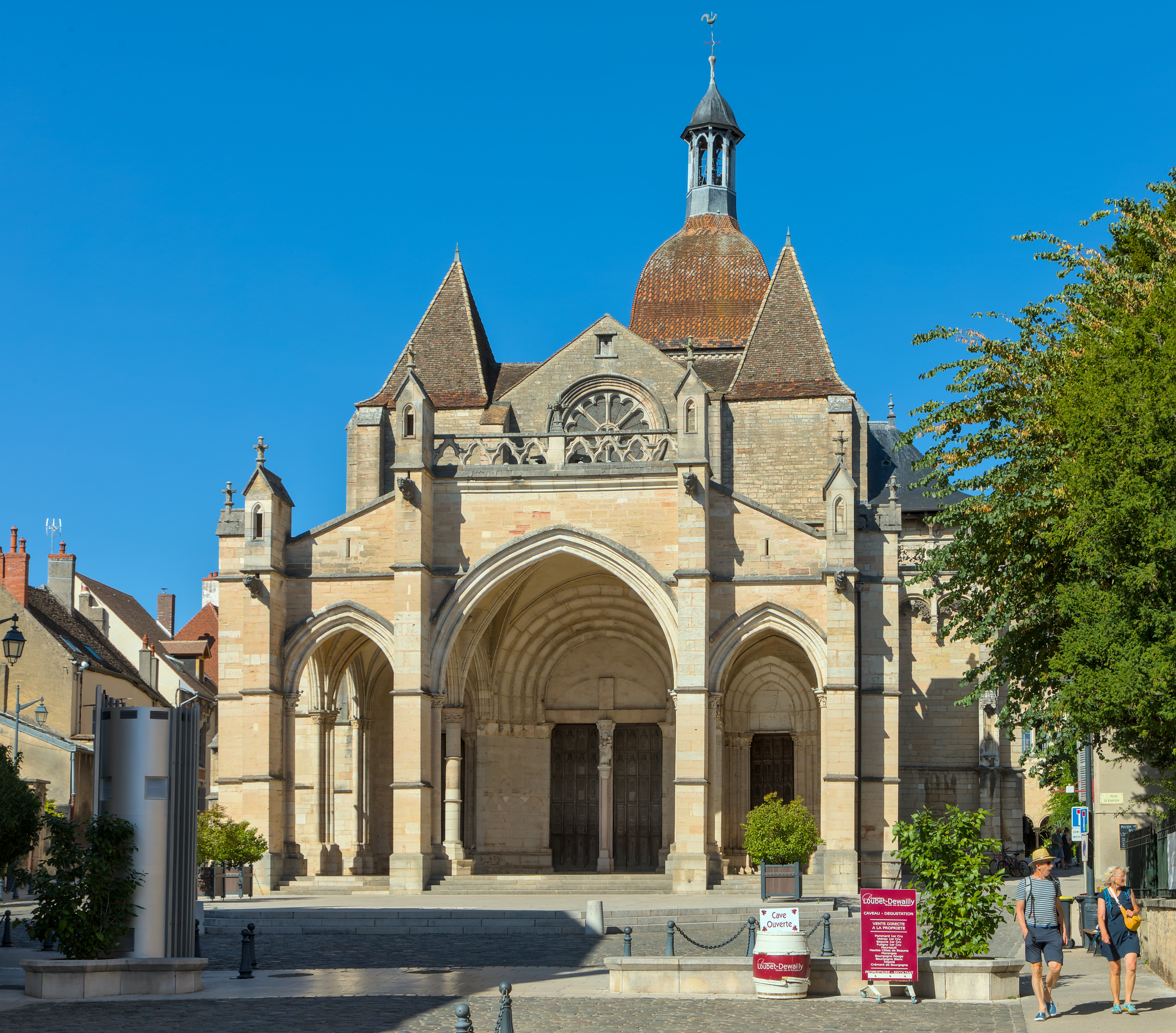
Collégiale Notre-Dame de Beaune

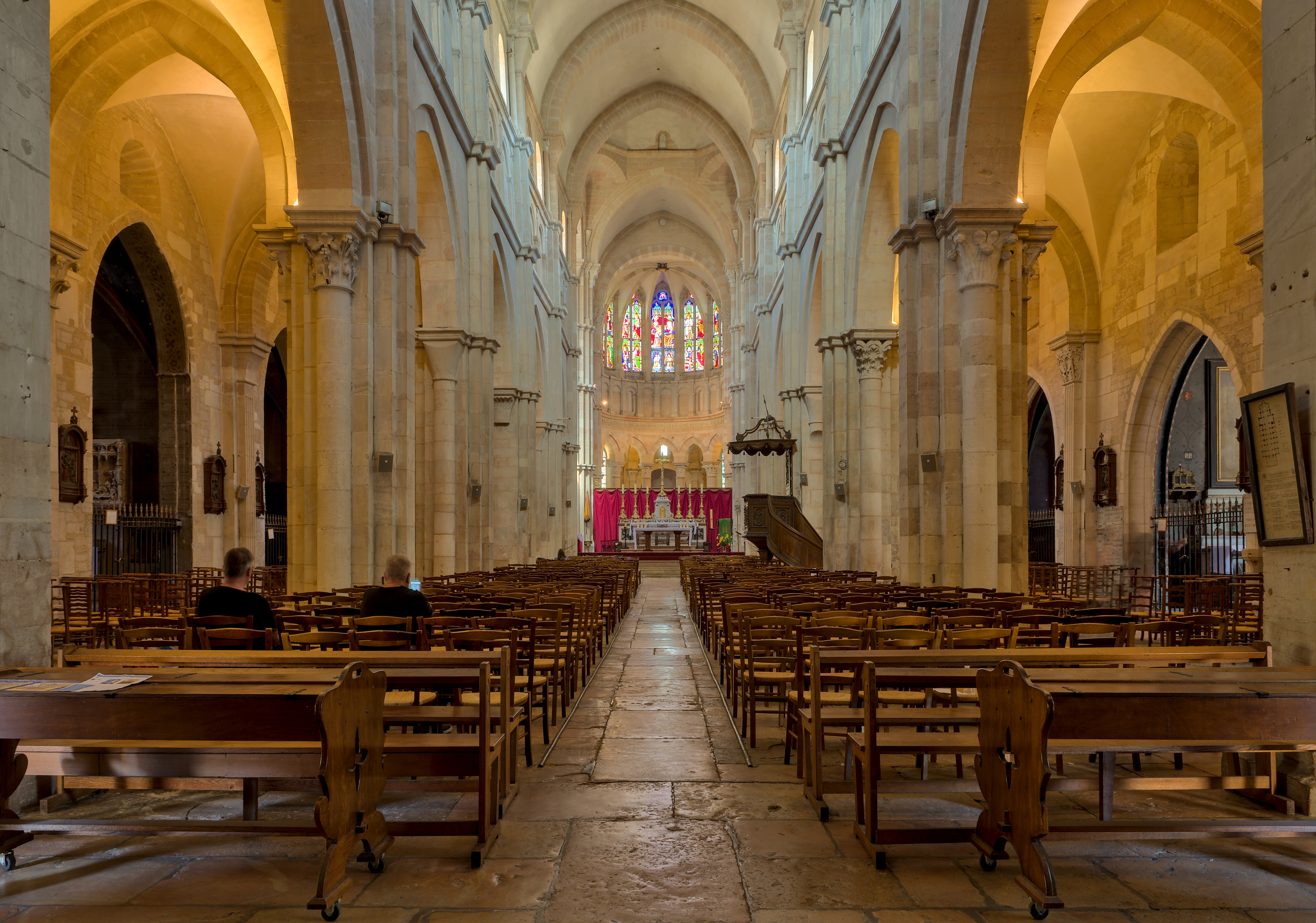
Collégiale Notre-Dame de Beaune

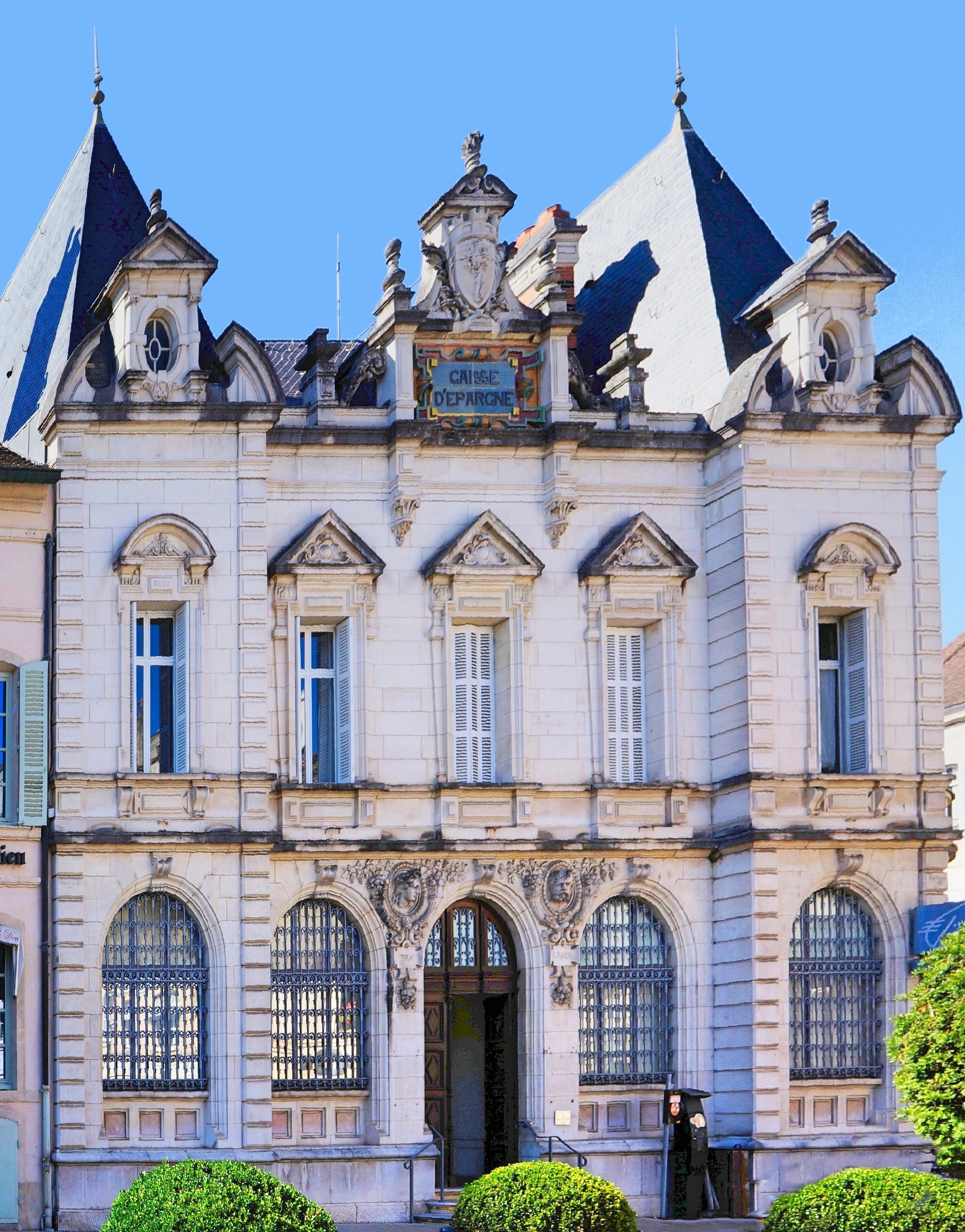
Bâtiment de la caisse d'épargne

== Climate ==
Climate data for Beaunne (Savigny-lès-Beaune) (1991–2020 normals, extremes 1940–present)
Month	Jan	Feb	Mar	Apr	May	Jun	Jul	Aug	Sep	Oct	Nov	Dec	Year
Record high °C (°F)	17.0 (62.6)	21.0 (69.8)	24.9 (76.8)	28.7 (83.7)	31.8 (89.2)	37.5 (99.5)	39.0 (102.2)	39.8 (103.6)	34.0 (93.2)	29.0 (84.2)	21.6 (70.9)	17.9 (64.2)	39.8 (103.6)
Mean daily maximum °C (°F)	5.9 (42.6)	7.9 (46.2)	12.8 (55.0)	16.5 (61.7)	20.5 (68.9)	24.5 (76.1)	26.8 (80.2)	26.5 (79.7)	21.9 (71.4)	16.4 (61.5)	10.0 (50.0)	6.4 (43.5)	16.3 (61.3)
Daily mean °C (°F)	3.1 (37.6)	4.3 (39.7)	8.2 (46.8)	11.5 (52.7)	15.4 (59.7)	19.1 (66.4)	21.2 (70.2)	20.9 (69.6)	16.8 (62.2)	12.2 (54.0)	6.9 (44.4)	3.7 (38.7)	11.9 (53.4)
Mean daily minimum °C (°F)	0.3 (32.5)	0.6 (33.1)	3.6 (38.5)	6.4 (43.5)	10.4 (50.7)	13.8 (56.8)	15.6 (60.1)	15.3 (59.5)	11.7 (53.1)	8.1 (46.6)	3.7 (38.7)	1.0 (33.8)	7.5 (45.5)
Record low °C (°F)	−20.5 (−4.9)	−20.0 (−4.0)	−11.0 (12.2)	−4.5 (23.9)	−2.0 (28.4)	3.0 (37.4)	5.0 (41.0)	4.5 (40.1)	0.5 (32.9)	−4.5 (23.9)	−9.5 (14.9)	−16.5 (2.3)	−20.5 (−4.9)
Average precipitation mm (inches)	58.9 (2.32)	49.2 (1.94)	52.0 (2.05)	57.3 (2.26)	69.2 (2.72)	62.1 (2.44)	67.4 (2.65)	56.3 (2.22)	55.3 (2.18)	76.0 (2.99)	80.3 (3.16)	68.9 (2.71)	752.9 (29.64)
Average precipitation days (≥ 1.0 mm)	10.8	9.4	9.5	9.6	10.4	8.8	8.2	7.4	7.9	10.1	11.3	11.3	114.8
Source: Meteociel

== See also ==
- Communes of the Côte-d'Or department
- French wine
- List of works by Henri Chapu Sculptor of Beaune memorial 1870
