= La Forêt de Saisy =

Coordinates: 46°58′13″N 4°32′58″E

La Forêt is a village in Burgundy. It is part of the Commune of Saisy in Saône-et-Loire département.
