= Sivry (Saisy) =

Coordinates: 46°57′8″N 4°34′11″E

Sivry is a village in Burgundy. It is part of the Commune of Saisy in Saône-et-Loire département.
