= Savigny-lès-Beaune =

- Commune
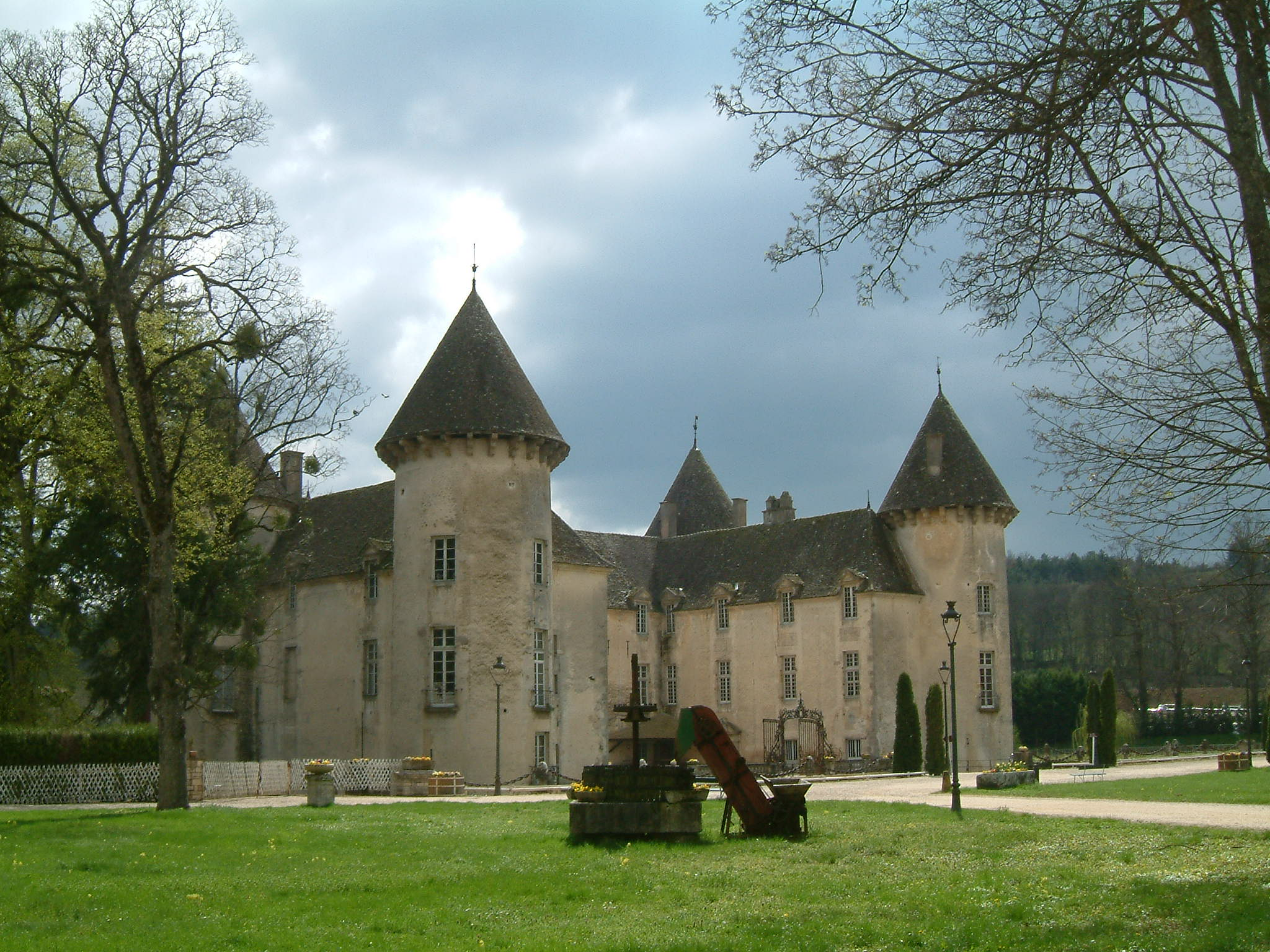
- Chateau

- Coat of arms
- Location of Savigny-lès-Beaune
- Location within France Location within Bourgogne-Franche-Comté
- Coordinates: 47°03′51″N 4°49′09″E
- Country: France
- Region: Bourgogne-Franche-Comté
- Department: Côte-d'Or
- Arrondissement: Beaune
- Canton: Ladoix-Serrigny
- Intercommunality: CA Beaune Côte et Sud

Government
  - Mayor (2020–2026): Sylvain Jacob
- Area^{1}: 35.98 km^{2} (13.89 sq mi)
- Highest elevation: 577 m (1,893 ft)
- Lowest elevation: 229 m (751 ft)
- Population (2023): 1,268
  - Density: 35.24/km^{2} (91.28/sq mi)
- Time zone: UTC+01:00 (CET)
  - Summer (DST): UTC+02:00 (CEST)
- INSEE/Postal code: 21590 /21420
- ^{1} French Land Register data, which excludes lakes, ponds, glaciers > 1 km^{2} (0.386 sq mi or 247 acres) and river estuaries.

Savigny-lès-Beaune (French pronunciation: [saviɲi lɛ bon], literally Savigny near Beaune) is a commune in the Côte-d'Or department in eastern France.

== Geography ==
=== Climate ===
Savigny-lès-Beaune has an oceanic climate (Köppen climate classification Cfb). The average annual temperature in Savigny-lès-Beaune is 11.6 °C (52.9 °F). The average annual rainfall is 749.6 mm (29.51 in) with May as the wettest month. The temperatures are highest on average in July, at around 21.0 °C (69.8 °F), and lowest in January, at around 2.5 °C (36.5 °F). The highest temperature ever recorded in Savigny-lès-Beaune was 39.8 °C (103.6 °F) on 12 August 2003; the coldest temperature ever recorded was −20.5 °C (−4.9 °F) on 9 January 1985.

Climate data for Savigny-lès-Beaune (1981–2010 averages, extremes 1940−present)
Month	Jan	Feb	Mar	Apr	May	Jun	Jul	Aug	Sep	Oct	Nov	Dec	Year
Record high °C (°F)	16.0 (60.8)	21.0 (69.8)	24.9 (76.8)	28.7 (83.7)	31.8 (89.2)	37.5 (99.5)	39.0 (102.2)	39.8 (103.6)	34.0 (93.2)	29.0 (84.2)	21.6 (70.9)	17.9 (64.2)	39.8 (103.6)
Mean daily maximum °C (°F)	5.3 (41.5)	7.3 (45.1)	12.1 (53.8)	15.6 (60.1)	20.0 (68.0)	23.7 (74.7)	26.6 (79.9)	26.1 (79.0)	21.6 (70.9)	16.2 (61.2)	9.6 (49.3)	5.9 (42.6)	15.9 (60.6)
Daily mean °C (°F)	2.5 (36.5)	3.8 (38.8)	7.7 (45.9)	10.8 (51.4)	15.1 (59.2)	18.6 (65.5)	21.0 (69.8)	20.6 (69.1)	16.6 (61.9)	12.1 (53.8)	6.4 (43.5)	3.3 (37.9)	11.6 (52.9)
Mean daily minimum °C (°F)	−0.3 (31.5)	0.4 (32.7)	3.3 (37.9)	6.0 (42.8)	10.2 (50.4)	13.4 (56.1)	15.5 (59.9)	15.0 (59.0)	11.6 (52.9)	8.0 (46.4)	3.3 (37.9)	0.7 (33.3)	7.3 (45.1)
Record low °C (°F)	−20.5 (−4.9)	−20.0 (−4.0)	−11.0 (12.2)	−4.5 (23.9)	−2.0 (28.4)	3.0 (37.4)	5.0 (41.0)	4.5 (40.1)	0.5 (32.9)	−4.5 (23.9)	−9.5 (14.9)	−16.5 (2.3)	−20.5 (−4.9)
Average precipitation mm (inches)	59.2 (2.33)	49.3 (1.94)	49.9 (1.96)	59.9 (2.36)	76.5 (3.01)	65.6 (2.58)	59.8 (2.35)	52.7 (2.07)	62.6 (2.46)	73.6 (2.90)	74.0 (2.91)	66.5 (2.62)	749.6 (29.51)
Average precipitation days (≥ 1.0 mm)	11.3	9.3	9.7	10.2	11.2	9.0	7.7	7.5	8.1	10.4	10.8	11.1	116.4
Source: Meteociel

== Wine ==
Savigny-lès-Beaune is one of the wine communes of the Côte de Beaune in the Côte-d'Or region.

== Heritage ==
The village houses several buildings of architectural interest, including several châteaux, a Romanesque clock tower and a church dedicated to St. Cassien.

=== Château and museums ===
The Château de Savigny-lès-Beaune dates from the fourteenth century. It has museums that have little to do with its wine producing activities. The Château has several museum collections: "Musee de la moto" (~250 motorbikes, from 1902–1960); "Musee de la Voiture de Course Abarth" (Abarth racing cars); "Musee de l'Aéronautique" (aviation - around 80 aircraft, mostly warbirds, including many by Dassault and Mikoyan/MiG); "Musee de al Maquettes d'Avion" (around 2,500 1:72 scale model aircraft); "Musee du Tracteur Enjambeur" (tractors); "Musee du Matériel Vinaire et Viticole" (viticulture); and "Musee des Pompeurs" (fire engines).

Historical population
Year	Pop.	±% p.a.
1968	1,285	—
1975	1,410	+1.33%
1982	1,404	−0.06%
1990	1,392	−0.11%
1999	1,422	+0.24%
2007	1,373	−0.44%
2012	1,347	−0.38%
2017	1,305	−0.63%
2023	1,268	−0.48%
Source: INSEE

== See also ==
- Route des Grands Crus
- Communes of the Côte-d'Or department
