= Auguste-Louis de Sivry =

French art collector and art dealer

Auguste-Louis de Sivry was a French art collector and art dealer, resident and mainly active in Venice in the 19th century.

He acquired part of the Nani collection of antiquities. In 1841 he sold part of his collection to the Musée Calvet in Avignon. Sometime after 1797 he bought Paris Bordone's Christ Disputing in the Temple from Count Tiepolo; it was still in de Sivry's collection in 1831 but is now in the Isabella Stewart Gardner Museum in Boston, Massachusetts. His collection also included The Annunciation, with Saint Emidius, now in the National Gallery, London, and a Portrait of Marchesa Balbi by Anthony van Dyck, now held by the National Gallery of Art in Washington, DC.
