= René Gaillard =

French racing cyclist (1927–2025)

Personal information
- Born: 24 September 1927 Besançon, France
- Died: 6 October 2025 (aged 98) Vaivre-et-Montoille, France

Cycling career
- Sport: Cycling

René Gaillard (French: [ʁəne ɡajaʁ]; 24 September 1927 – 6 October 2025) was a French racing cyclist.

== Biography ==
Born in Besançon on 24 September 1927, Gaillard participated in his first race in 1941. In the 1950s, he became a regional champion. He finished 16th in a race in Besançon won by Fausto Coppi, with Louison Bobet as runner-up. In 1999, he took part in a 3200 kilometer trip from Chicago to Los Angeles in the "Route 66 by bike" series. In 2017, he became the hour record holder for 90-94 year-old men by cycling 29.278 km in one hour on the Vélodrome National. In 2021, he was considered the dean of French cycling following the death of Robert Marchand. In May 2025, he was still cycling at almost 98 years old. He had cycled an estimated 550,000 km in his lifetime.

Gaillard was the father of actress Manoëlle Gaillard. His eldest daughter, Evelyne, worked as a wedding dress merchant in Vesoul. His wife, Colette, was a keyboard player.

Gaillard died in Vaivre-et-Montoille on 6 October 2025, at the age of 98.
