= Vaivre =

Vaivre may refer to the following places in France:

- Grange-de-Vaivre, a commune in the Jura department in eastern France
- La Basse-Vaivre, a commune in the Haute-Saône department in eastern France
- La Vaivre, a commune in the Haute-Saône department in eastern France
- Lac de Vaivre, an artificial lake in Vesoul, in Haute-Saône, France
- Rémondans-Vaivre, a commune in the Doubs department in eastern France
- Vaivre-et-Montoille, a commune in the Haute-Saône department in eastern France
