= René de Boisdeffre =

French composer

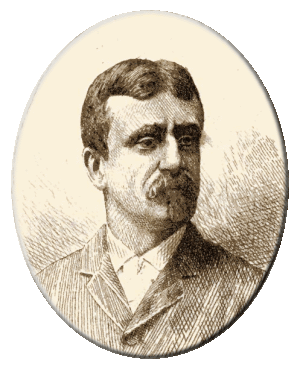
- Born: René Le Mouton de Boisdeffre; 3 April 1838; Vesoul
- Died: 25 November 1906 (aged 68); Vézelise
- Occupation: Composer

René de Boisdeffre (3 April 1838 – 25 November 1906) was a French composer. He is the author of some 60 pieces of chamber music as well as a few pieces for piano and vocal music. General de Boisdeffre was his cousin.

== Biographical sketch ==
Boisdeffre was born in Vesoul, Département Haute Saône, into a family of military traditions and moved with his family to Paris in 1843. His musical education began with Charles Wagner (himself a pupil of P. J. G. Zimmermann) and was continued with Auguste Barbereau.

Quite conservative in his style, Boisdeffre owed much to Gounod and Massenet in his vocal music, while his instrumental scores were influenced by Lalo and Saint-Saëns.

In May 1883, Boisdeffre was awarded the Prix Chartier for his chamber music.

He died in Vézelise, Département Lorraine, aged 68.

== Works ==
=== Instrumental music ===
- Premier recueil de trois romances sans paroles for piano, Op. 1
- Deuxième recueil de trois romances sans paroles for piano, Op. 2
- Sérénade for violin, organ and piano, Op. 5
- Mélodie in A major for viola and piano, Op. 6
- Deux Pièces for piano, Op. 7
- Scherzo-sérénade for two pianos, Op. 9
- Piano Trio No. 1 in B♭ major, Op. 10
- Piano Quintet in D minor, Op. 11
- Sonata No. 1 in A major for violin (or clarinet) and piano, Op. 12
- Piano Quartet No. 1 in G minor, Op. 13
- Marche religieuse for orchestra arranged for piano four hands, Op. 14
- Six Pièces for cello and piano, Op. 15
- Suite poétique for violin and piano, Op. 19
- Trois Pièces for clarinet (or violin) and piano, Op. 20
- Romance et canzonetta for violin and orchestra, Op. 21
- Suite romantique for violin and piano, Op. 24
- Piano Quintet in D major (piano, violin, viola, cello, double bass), Op. 25
- Trois Pièces for oboe and piano, Op. 26
- Trois Pièces for flute and piano, Op. 31
- Piano Trio No. 2 in G minor, Op. 32
- Berceuse for viola and piano, Op. 34
- Epithalame for violin, cello, harp and organ, Op. 36
- Méditation et cantilène for cello and piano, Op. 37
- Douze Morceaux de genre for piano, Op. 38
- Trois Pièces for clarinet (or viola) and piano, Op. 40 (1873)
- Suite orientale for cello (or violin) and piano, Op. 42
- Sextet No. 1 in B♭ major for piano, string quartet and double bass (ad. lib.), Op. 43
- Pièces symphoniques pour piano à quatre mains, Op. 44
- Septet in B♭ major for piano, flute, oboe, clarinet, horn, bassoon and double bass ad. lib., Op. 49
- Sonata No. 2 in E minor for violin and piano, Op. 50
- Lamento et chant d'automne for cello and piano, Op. 51
- Trois Pièces for trio with piano, Op. 54
- Rêverie for viola d'amore (or violin, or viola, or cello) and string orchestra with harp or piano, Op. 55 (1890?)
- Suite for cello and piano, Op. 56
- Sonata in F major for cello and piano, Op. 63
- Trois Pièces for piano quartet (piano, violin, viola, cello), Op. 64
- Sonata No. 3 in G major for violin and piano, Op. 67
- 2 Idylles for violin and piano, Op. 75
- Deux Pièces for violin and piano, Op. 77
- Sextet No. 2 in A minor for piano, string quartet and double bass, Op. 81
- Suite in D major for piano trio, Op. 83
- Sérénade for flute, violin and piano, Op. 85
- Scènes villageoises for oboe and piano, op. 86
- Poème pastoral for violin (or oboe), cello and piano, Op. 87
- Chant d'église for violin with organ or piano accompaniment, Op. 89 (c.1898)
- Piano Quartet No. 2 in E♭ major, Op. 91
- Trois Pièces pittoresques for cello and piano, Op. 93

=== Vocal music ===
- Six Mélodies for voice and piano, Op. 3
- O Salutaris for baritone, Op. 4
- Deux idylles for voice and piano, Op. 8
- Le Cantique des cantiques (Elie Cabrol), op. 16
- Les Martyrs, sacred drama in three parts (Louis Gallet, inspired by Chateaubriand), Op. 17
- Moïse sauvé des eaux (Paul Collin) for soloists and choir, Op. 18
- Latone (Paul Collin), for solo voice and choir, Op. 22
- Printemps d'amour (Paul Collin), Op. 23
- L'Abeille (Chantepie), choir for female voice and tenor, Op. 27
- Ewa la folle (Paul Collin) for solo voice and choirs, Op. 28
- Jeanne d'Arc prisonnière (Paul Collin) for soprano, Op. 29
- Six Mélodies for voice, Op. 30
- Les Saisons (Paul Collin) for female choir, Op. 35(?)
- Ave Maria for two voices with organ accompaniment, Op. 35
- Six Mélodies for voice, Op. 39
- Dans la forêt (Edouard Guinand), symphonic ode for solo voice and choir, Op. 41
- Six Mélodies for voice, Op. 45
- Les Lendemains de la vie (Edouard Guinand), ode for soloists and choir, Op. 46

=== Orchestral music ===
- Au bord d'un ruisseau, sérénade champêtre for orchestra, Op. 52

== Discography ==
- 2016: Acte Préalable AP0362 – René de Boisdeffre - Works for violin and piano 1
- 2017: Acte Préalable AP0379 – René de Boisdeffre - Works for flute and piano
- 2017: Acte Préalable AP0401 – René de Boisdeffre - Works for viola and piano 1
- 2017: Acte Préalable AP0402 – René de Boisdeffre - Works for viola and piano 2
- 2018: Acte Préalable AP0414 – René de Boisdeffre - Choral Works
- 2018: Acte Préalable AP0418 – René de Boisdeffre - Works for cello and piano
- 2019: Acte Préalable AP0445 – René de Boisdeffre - Works for oboe and piano
- 2019: Acte Préalable AP0446 – René de Boisdeffre - Works for piano trio
- 2020: Acte Préalable AP0464 – René de Boisdeffre - Works for clarinet or cello and piano
- 2020: Acte Préalable AP0478 – René de Boisdeffre - Works for violin, cello and piano
- 2020: Acte Préalable AP0481 – René de Boisdeffre - Songs 1
- 2021: Acte Préalable AP0482 – René de Boisdeffre - Songs 2
- 2021: Acte Préalable AP0483 – René de Boisdeffre - Songs 3
- 2021: Acte Préalable AP0513 – René de Boisdeffre - Works for violin and piano 2
- 2021: Acte Préalable AP0515 – René de Boisdeffre - Piano Sextets
- 2021: Acte Préalable AP0519 – René de Boisdeffre - Works for violin and piano 3
- 2022: Acte Préalable AP0532 – René de Boisdeffre - Complete piao works

== Bibliography ==
- François de Boisdeffre: Les Le Mouton (Paris, 2007).
- François Joseph Fétis: Biographie universelle des musiciens (Paris, 1867), vol. 8, p. 404.
- Hugues Imbert: Nouveaux profils de musiciens (Paris, 1892), pp. 3–42.
- Frédéric Robert: "Boisdeffre, René le Mouton de", in Ludwig Finscher (ed.): Die Musik in Geschichte und Gegenwart, biographical part vol. 3 (Kassel: Bärenreiter, 2000), col. 275–276.
