= Notre-Dame-de-la-Motte =

Chapel located in Haute-Saône, France

Coordinates: 47°37′25″N 6°09′28″E

Notre Dame de la Motte
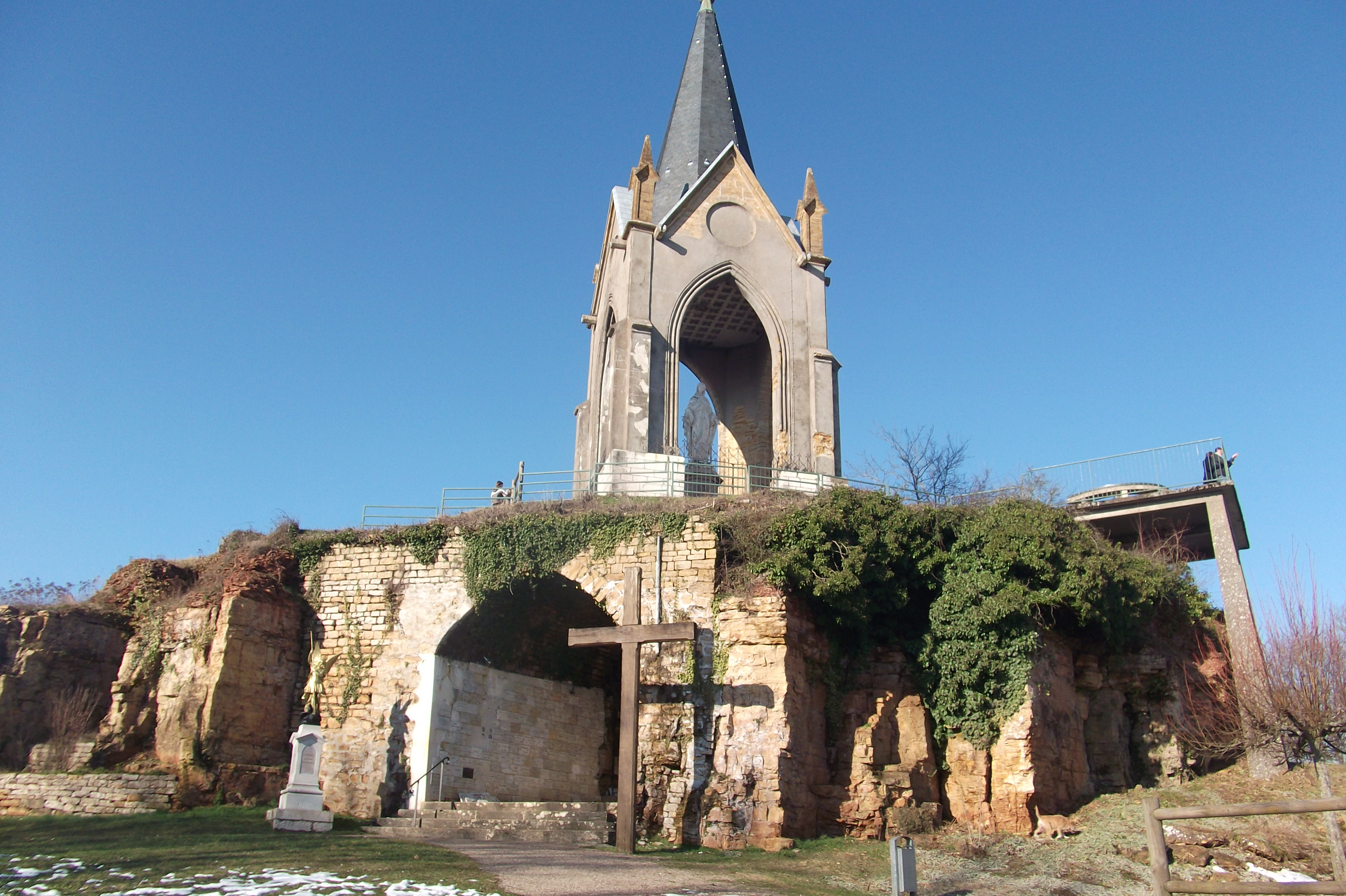
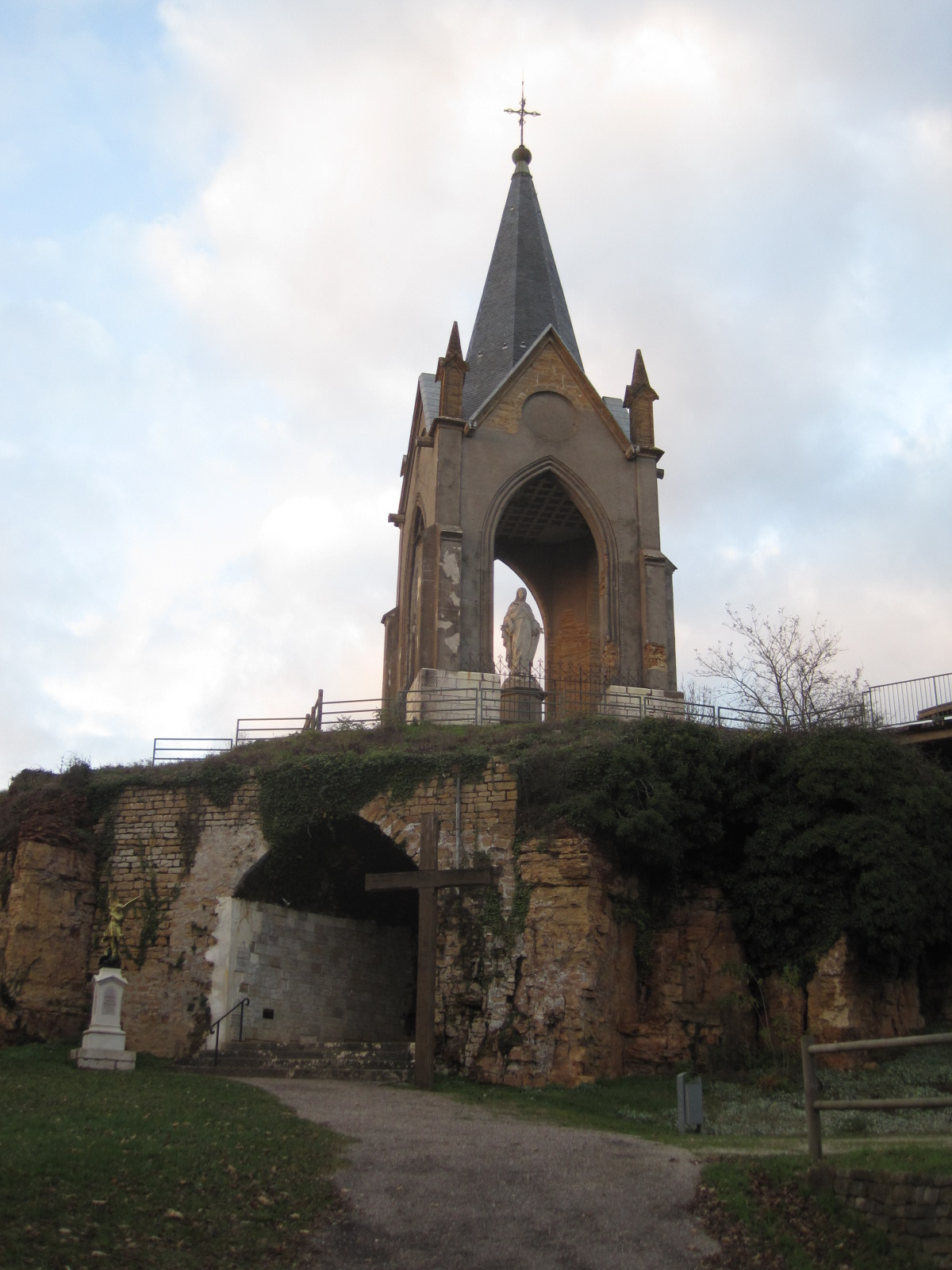
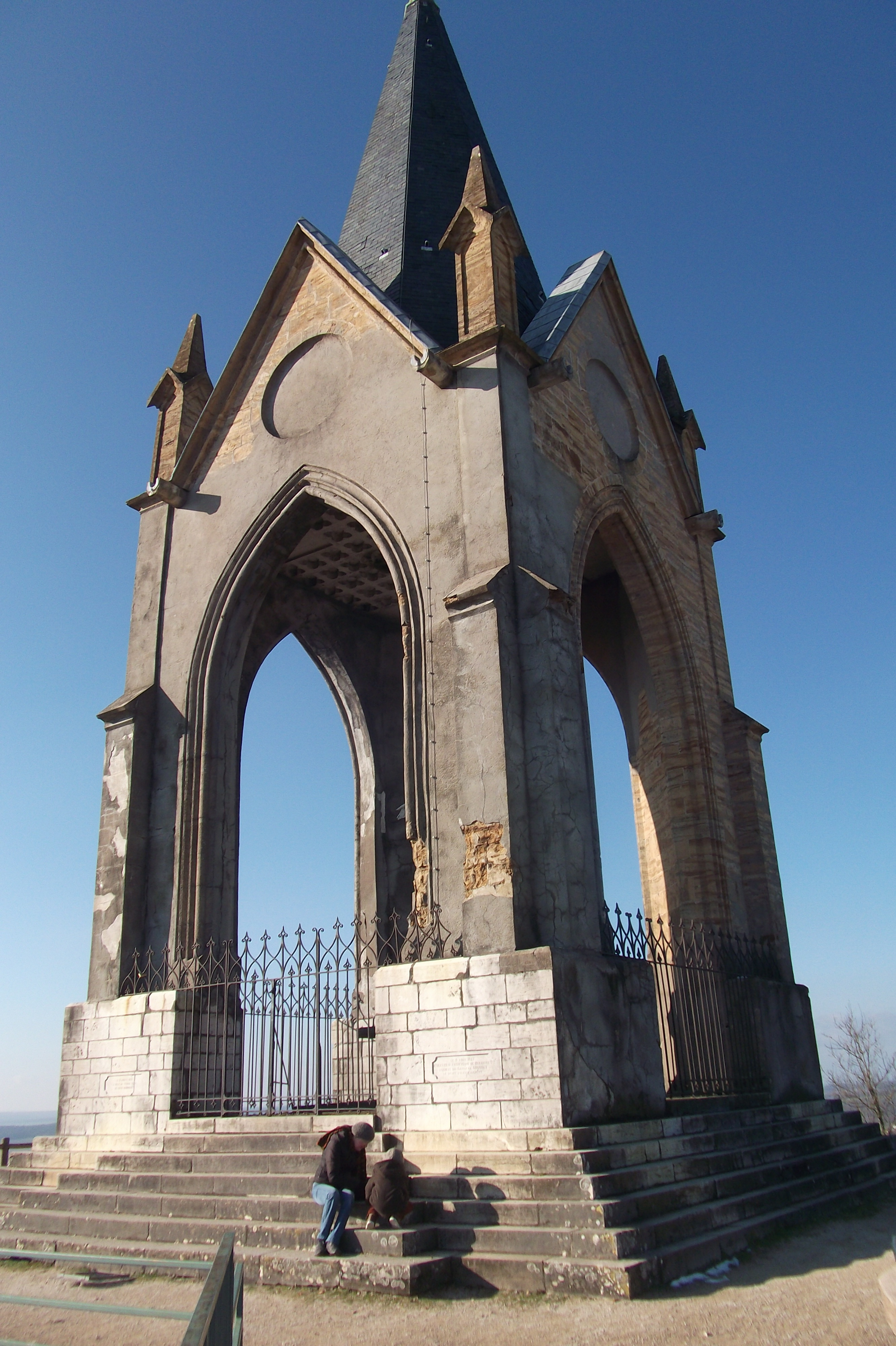
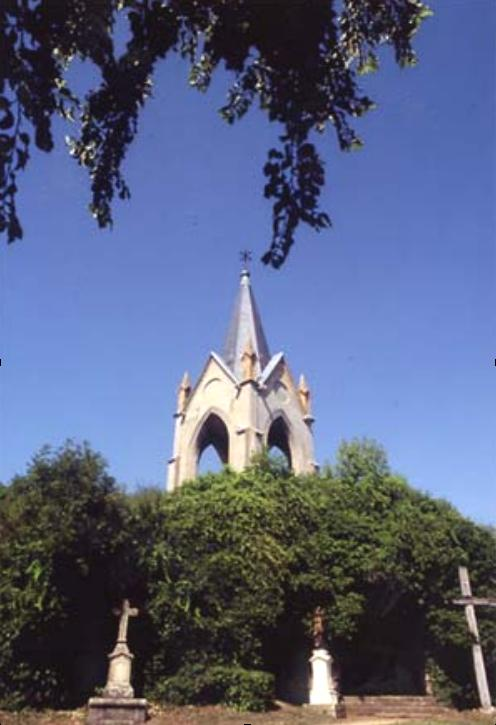
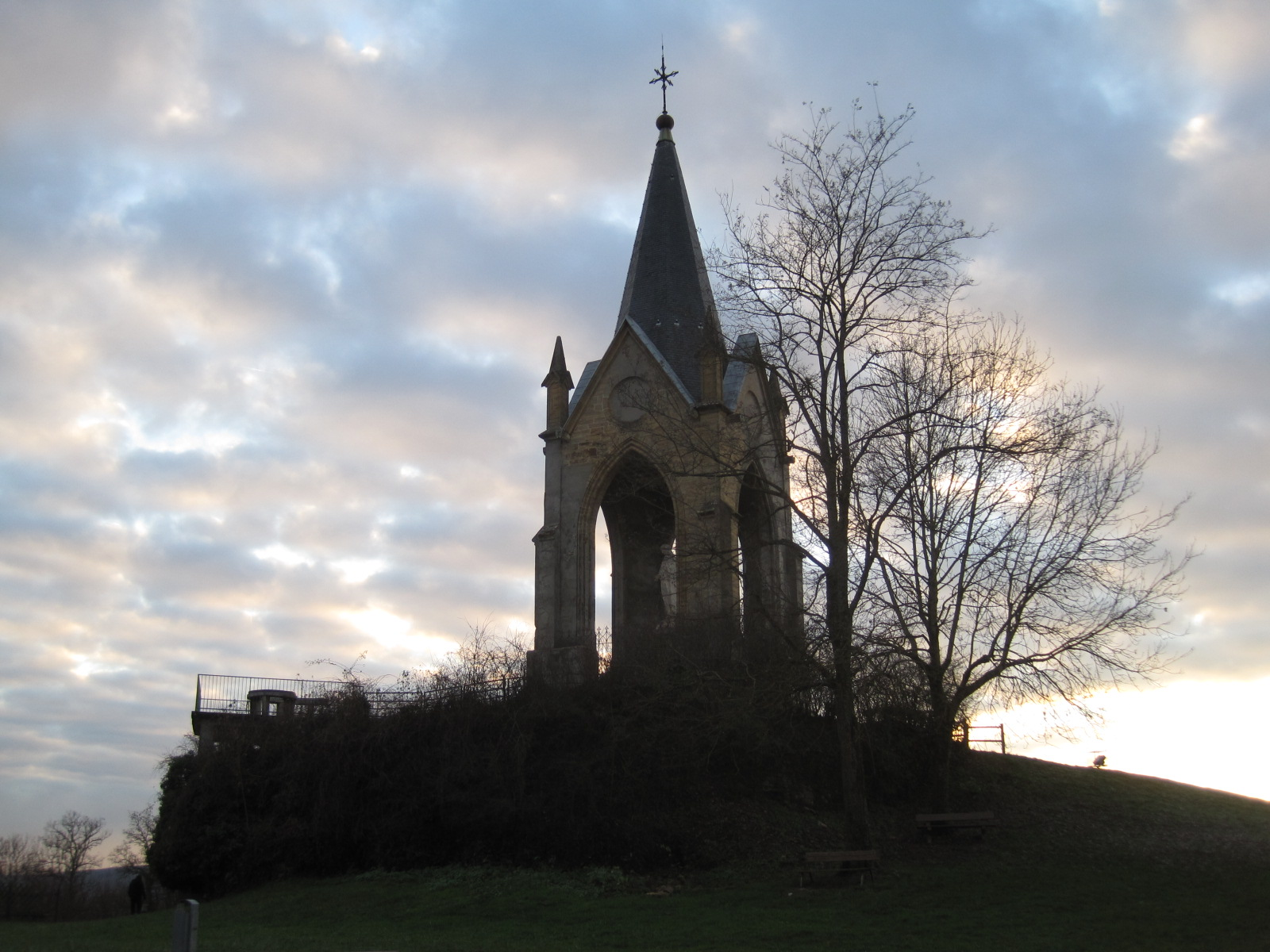

Religion
- Affiliation: Roman Catholic
- Ecclesiastical or organizational status: Pilgrimage Chapel

Location
- Location: Vesoul, Haute-Saône, France
- Interactive map of Notre Dame de la Motte

Architecture
- Type: Chapel
- Completed: 1857

Notre Dame de la Motte is a chapel located at the top of the hill de la Motte, in Vesoul (France).
