= St. George's Church, Vesoul =

Church in France

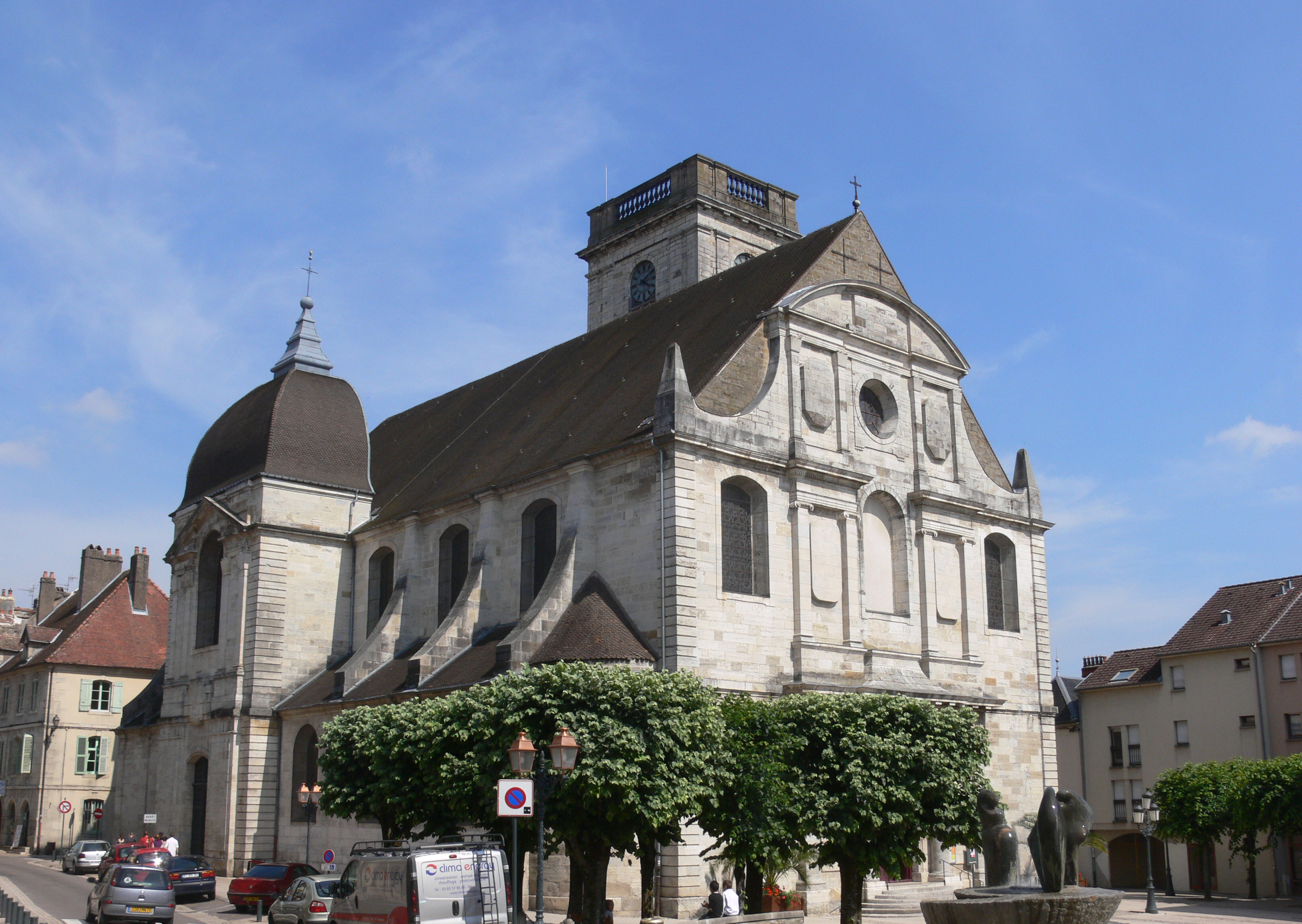
St. George's Church, Vesoul

The St. George's Church, Vesoul is a church in Vesoul, in France.

== Gallery ==
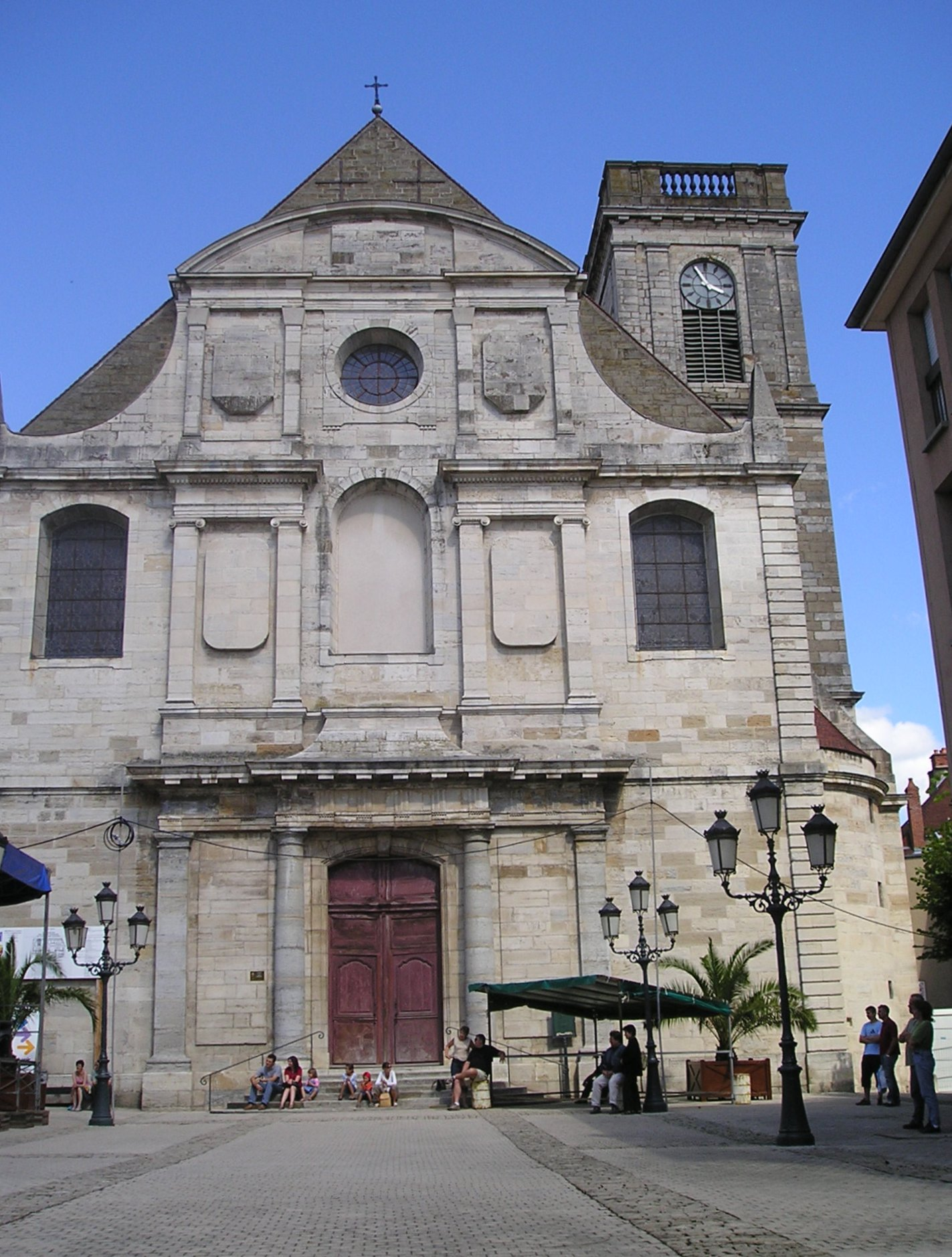

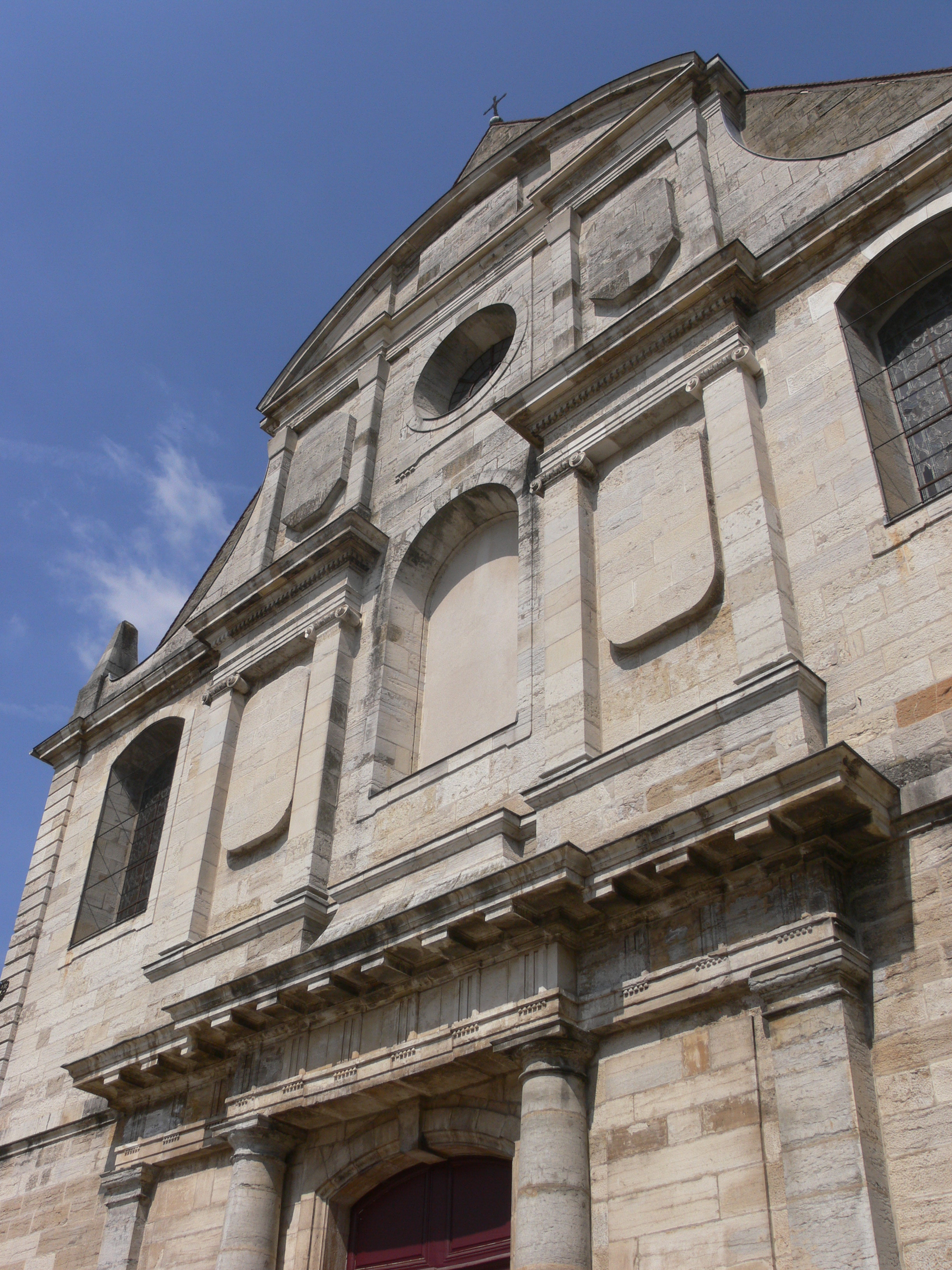

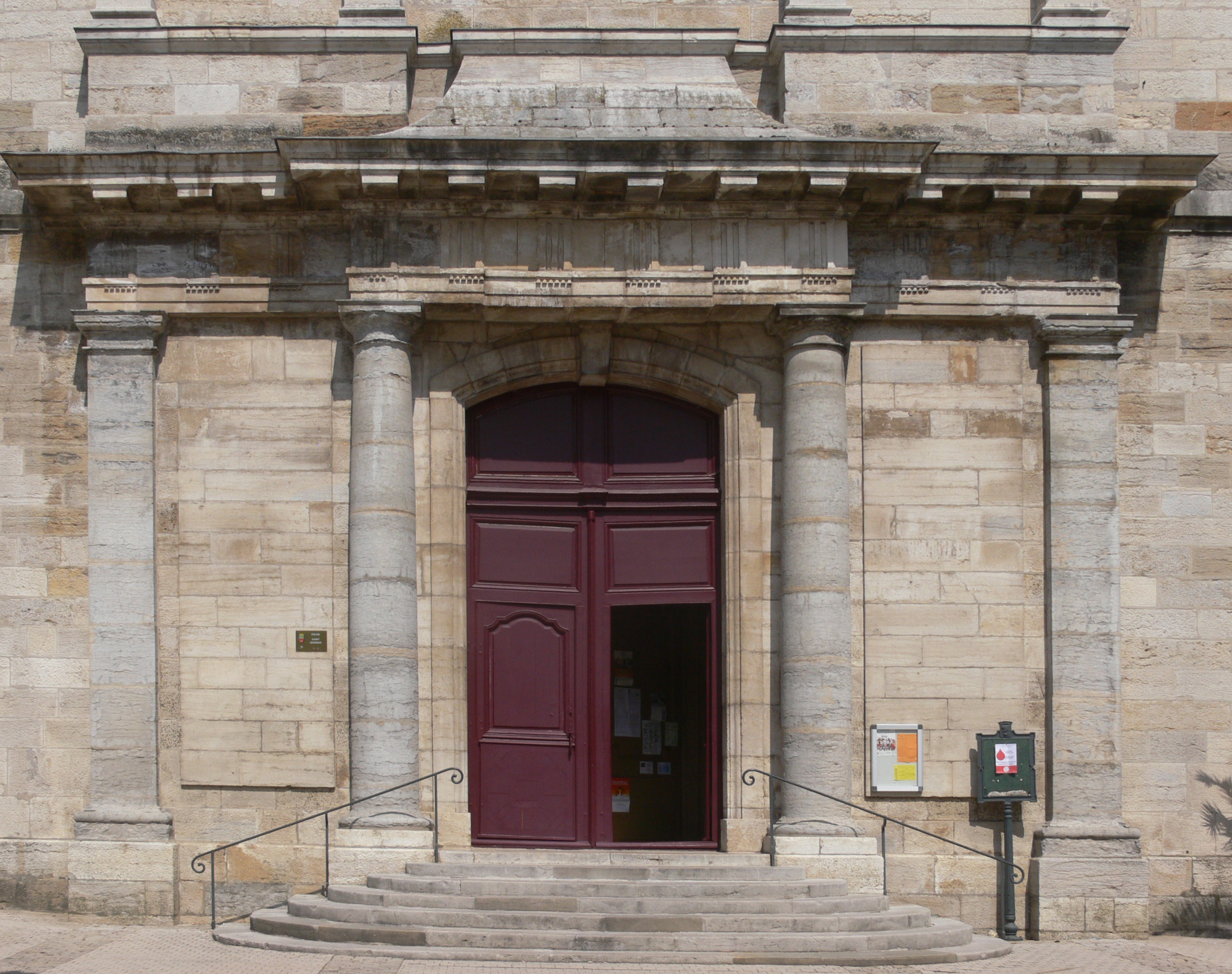

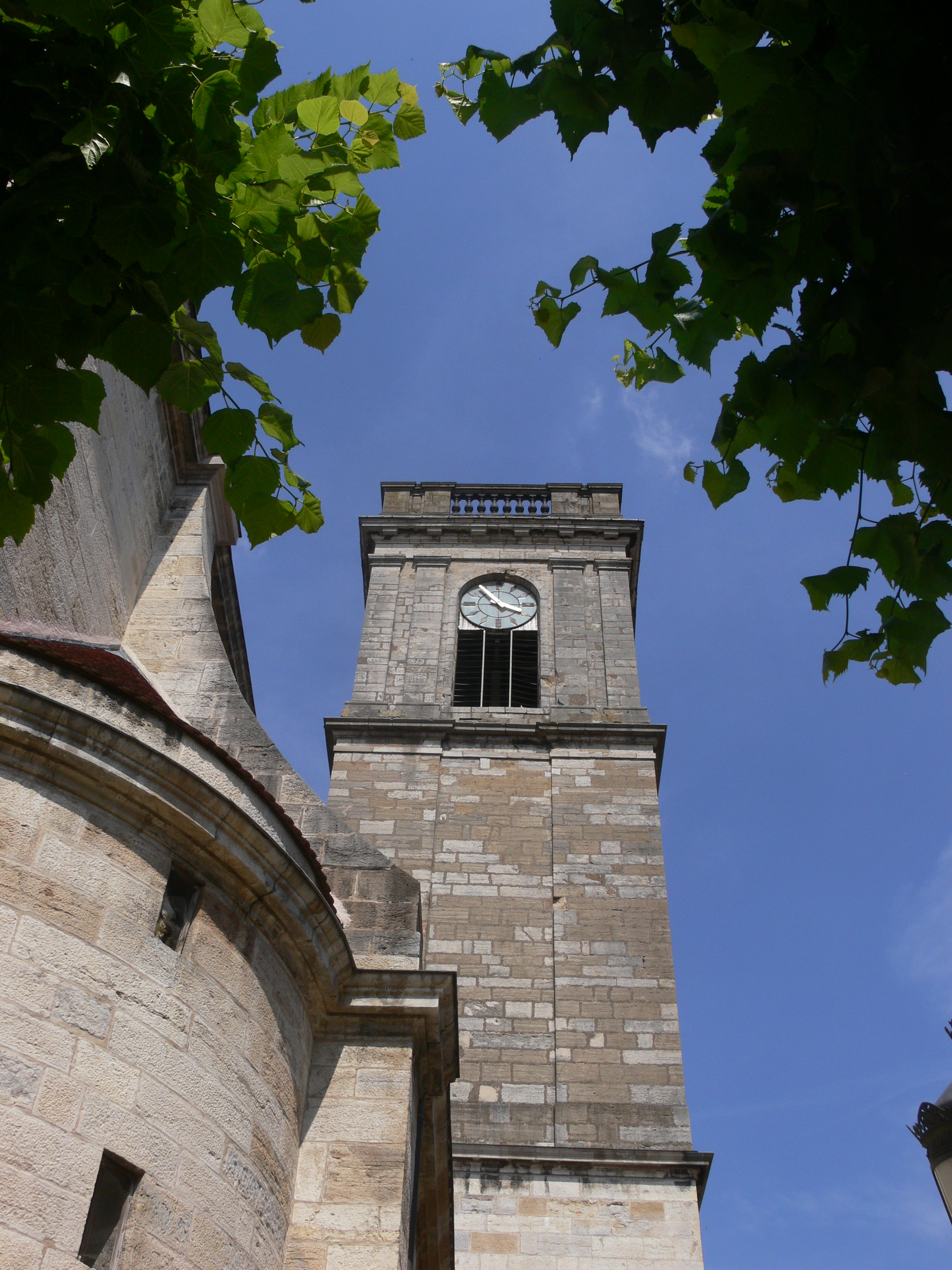
