= Sabot de Frotey National Nature Reserve =

Coordinates: 47°37′55″N 6°11′05″E

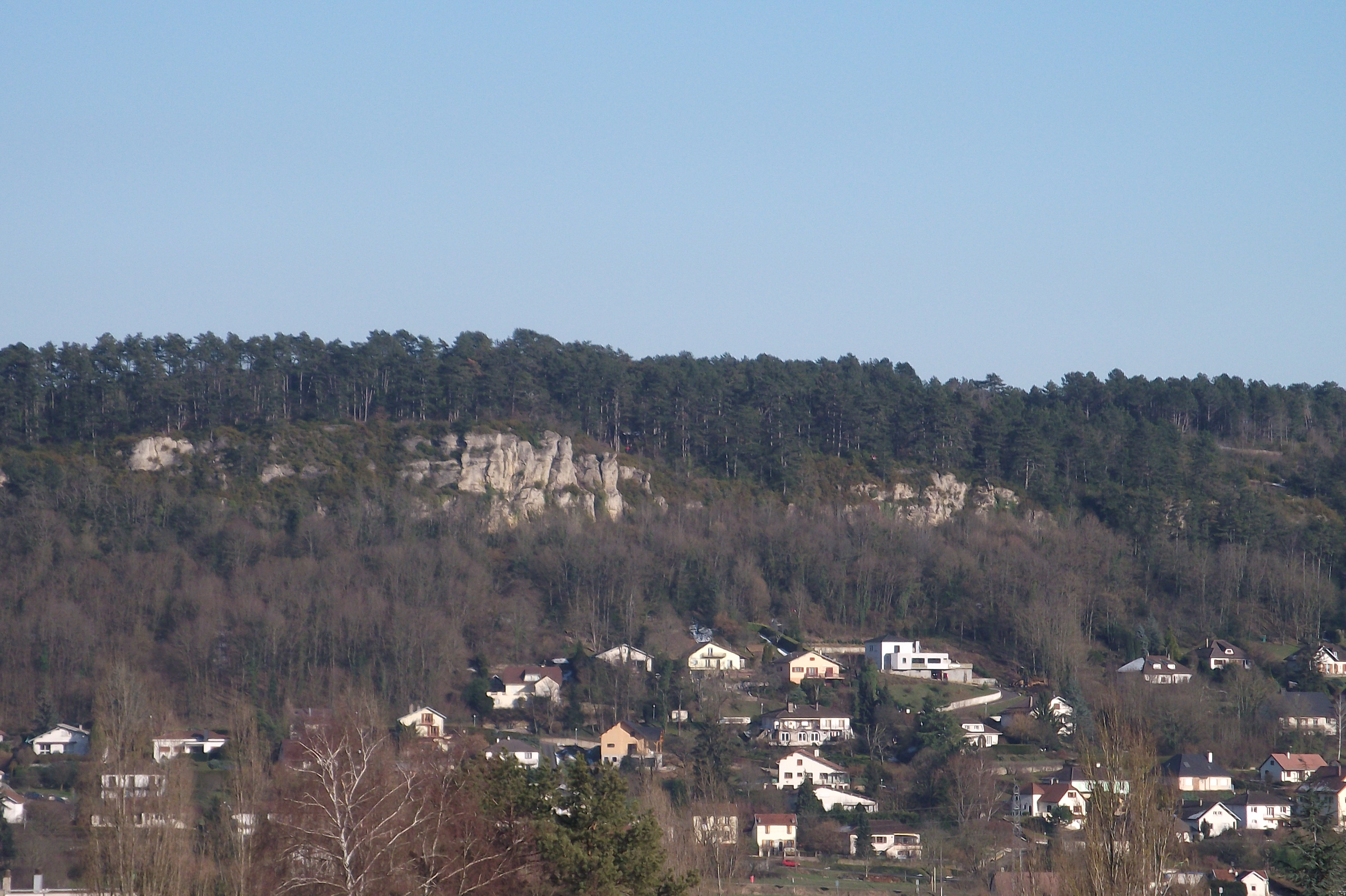

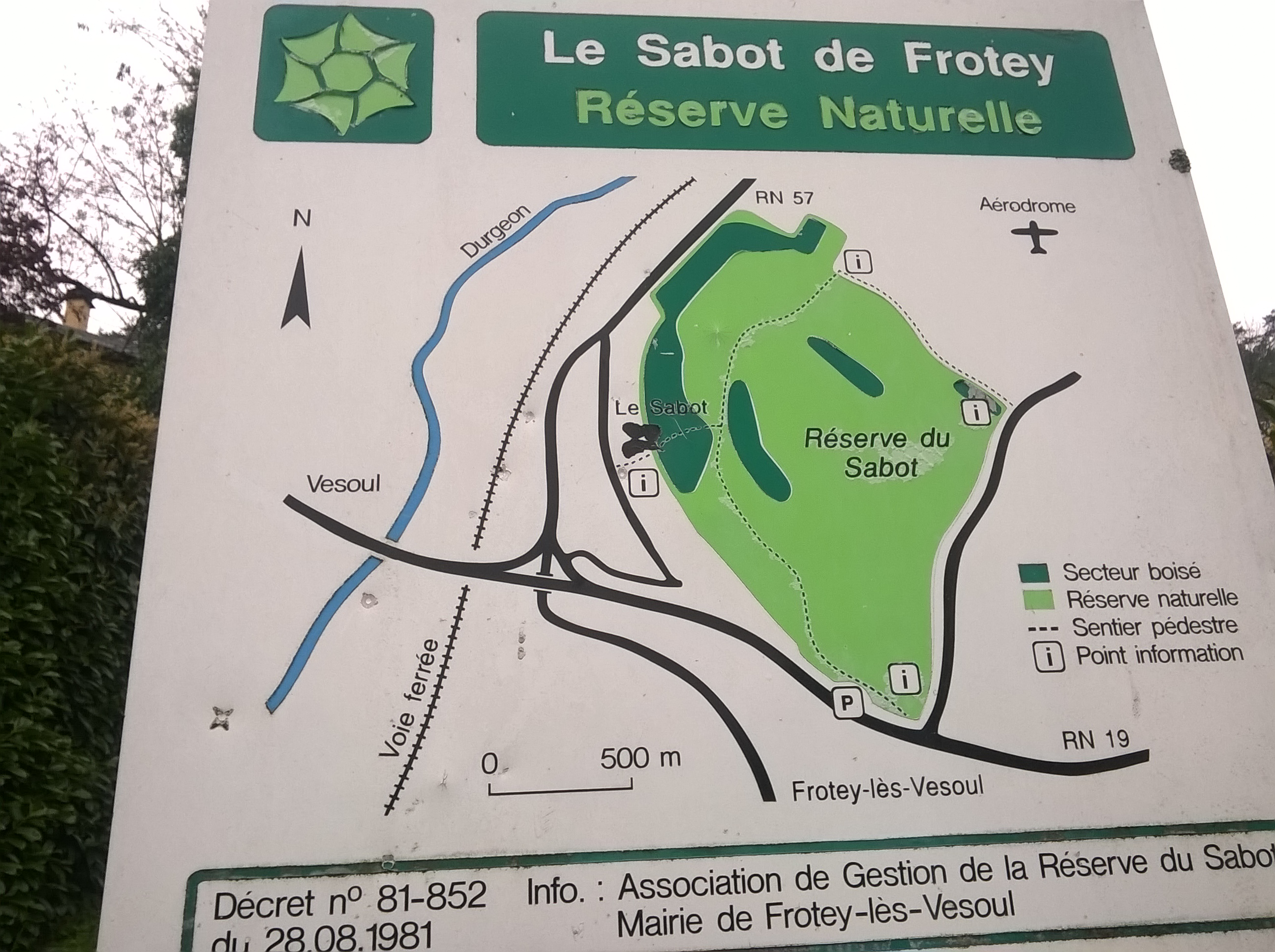
Posted map of the reserve in 2016

Sabot de Frotey National Nature Reserve is a national nature reserve located in Vesoul, France. It was created in 1981 over 98 hectares to protect the area from urbanisation by the nearby city of Vesoul. The reserve features at least 440 different flora species including 20 different species of orchid, 39 species of orthoptera and 500 species of butterflies. Since 2000, 30 hectares of the area was allocated for use as sheep pastures.
