= Durgeon =

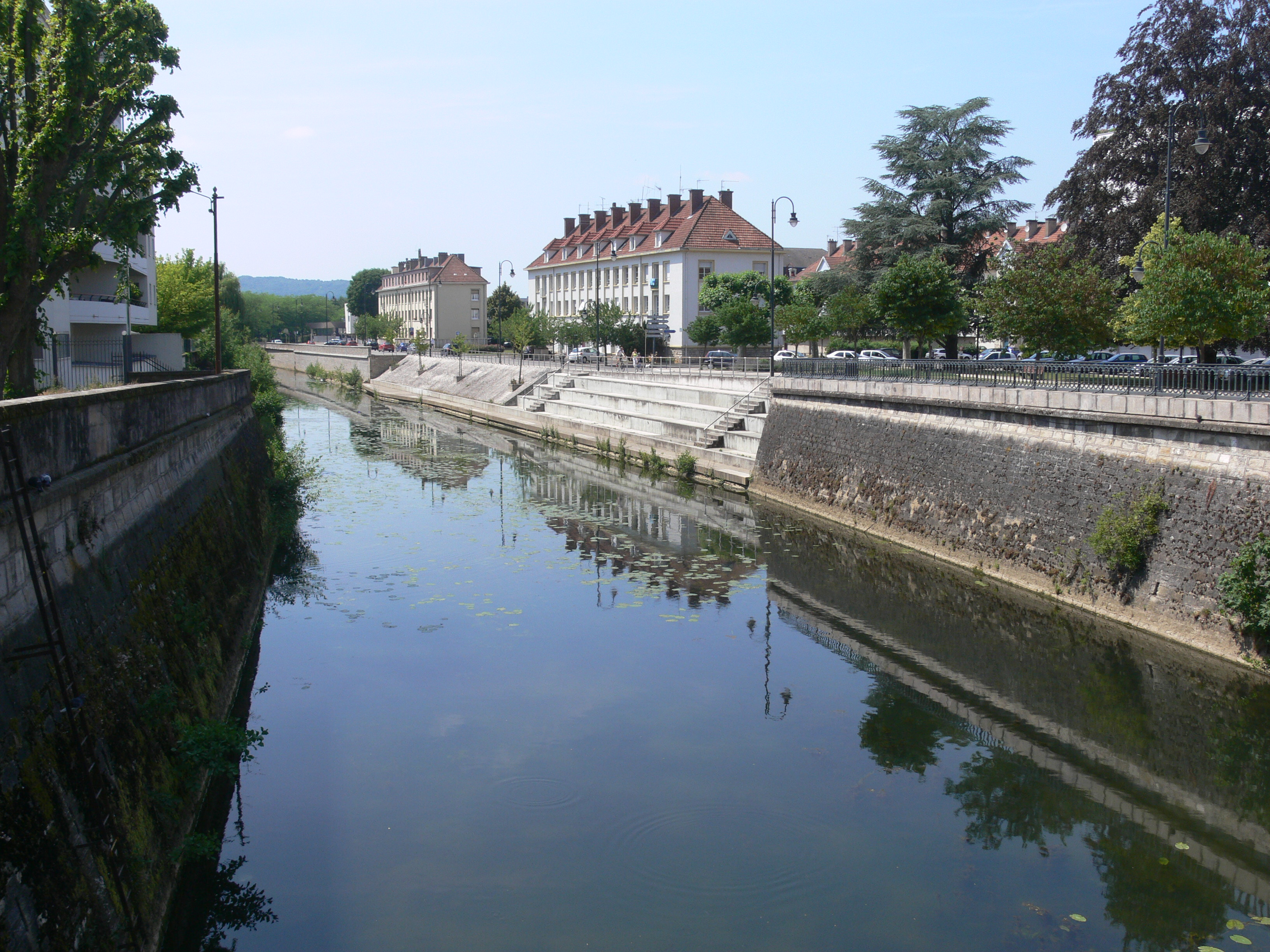

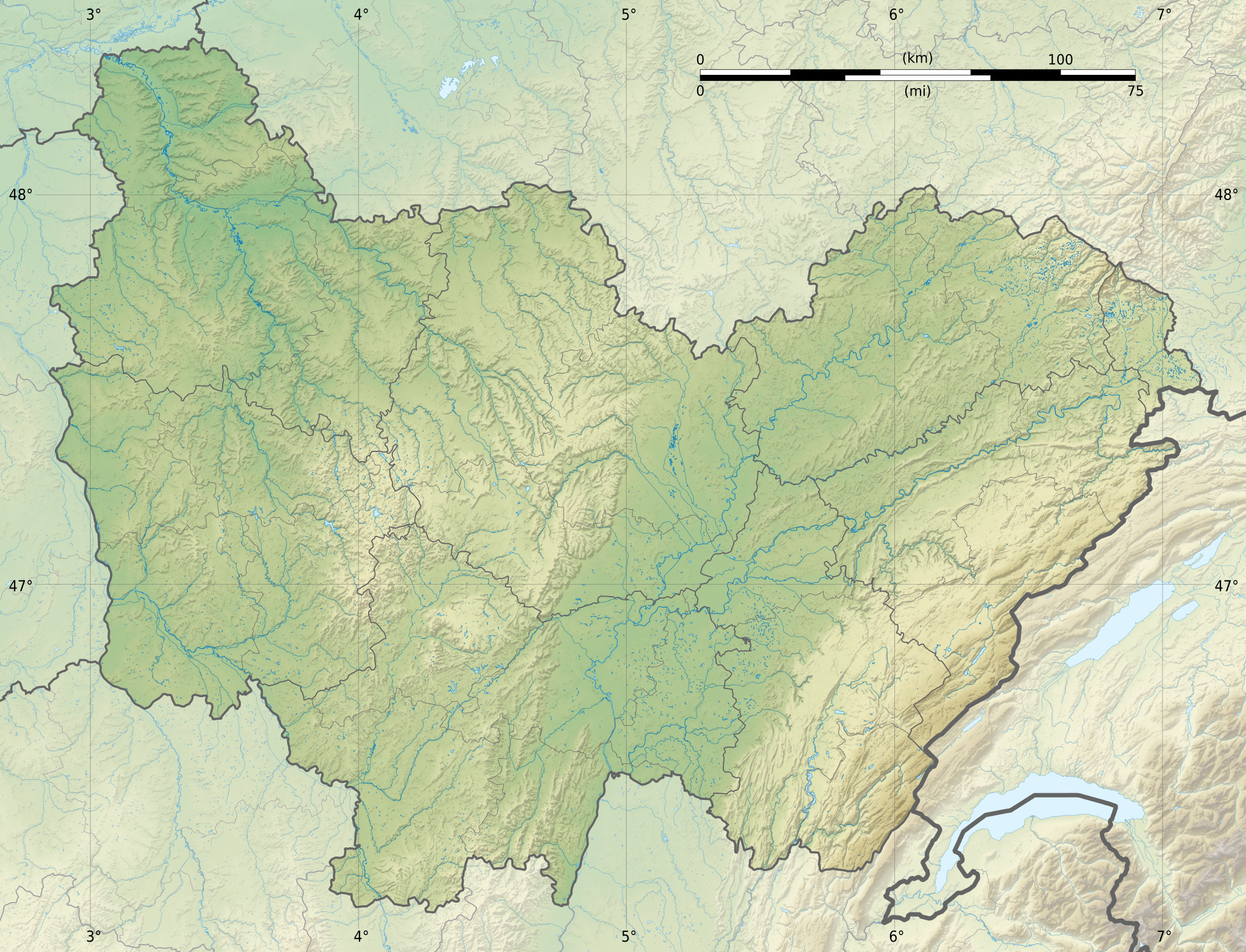
- Location within France Location within Bourgogne-Franche-Comté

Location
- Country: France

Physical characteristics
- Mouth: Saône
  - coordinates: 47.6501°N 6.024°E
- Length: 42 km (26 mi)

Basin features
- Progression: Saône→ Rhône→ Mediterranean Sea

The Durgeon (French: [dyʁʒɔ̃]) is a 42.4 km river in Haute-Saône in Franche-Comté, eastern France. It rises in Genevrey and flows generally west to join the Saône at Chemilly. The town Vesoul is situated on its banks.
