= Lac de Vesoul – Vaivre =

Lac de Vaivre
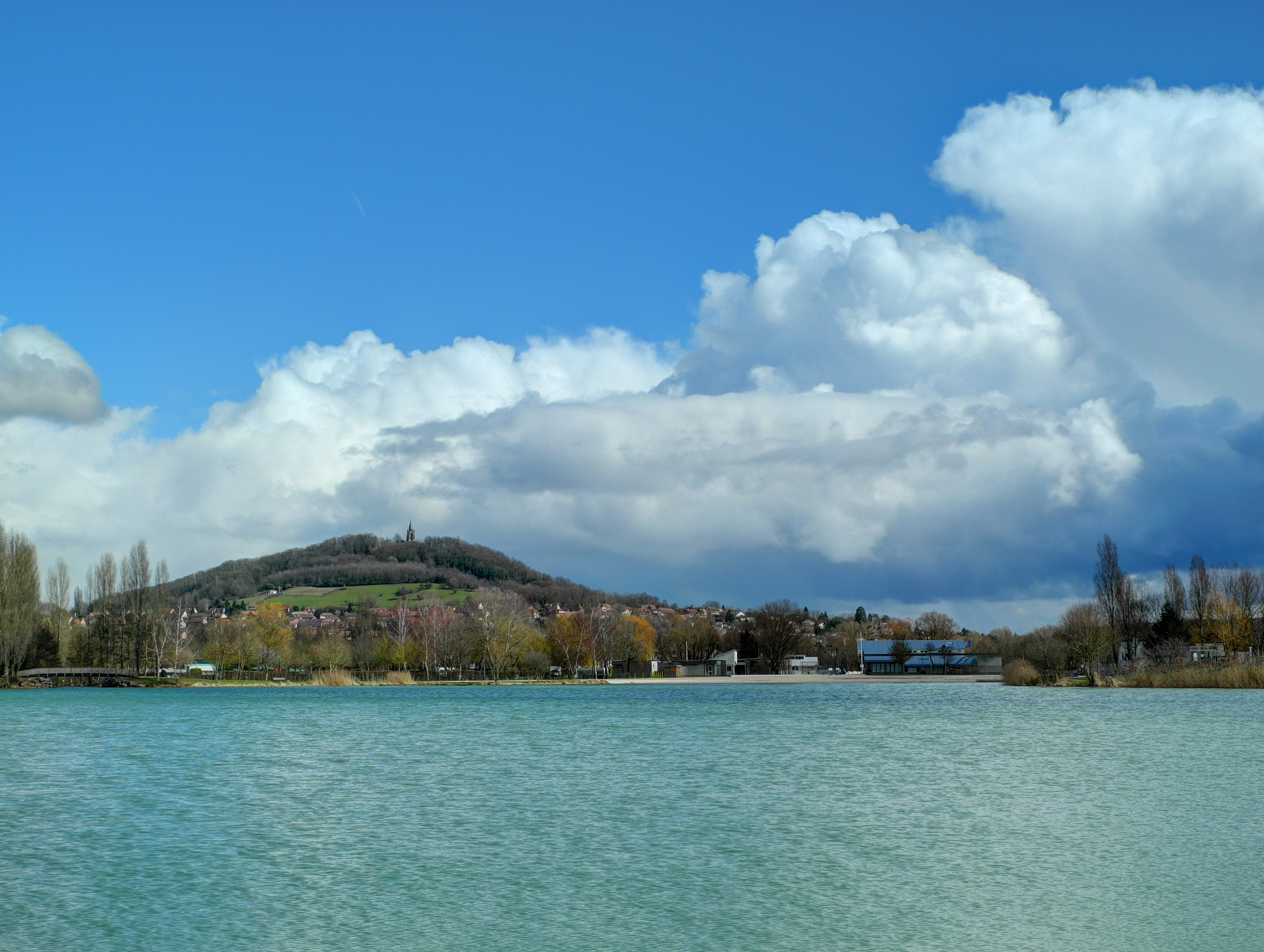

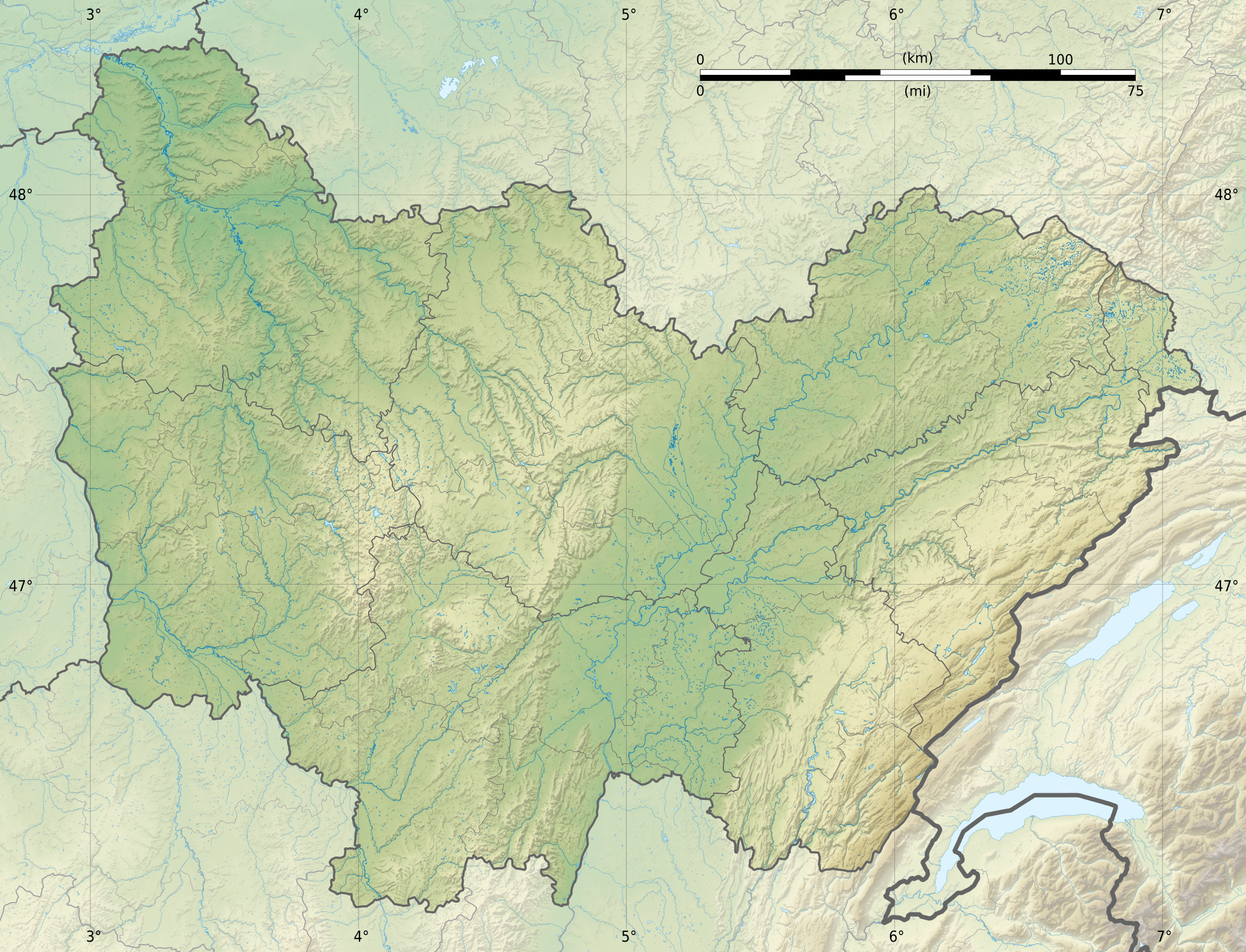
- Location within Bourgogne-Franche-Comté
- Location: Vaivre-et-Montoille, Haute-Saône
- Coordinates: 47°38′N 6°7′E
- Type: artificial
- Primary outflows: Durgeon River
- Basin countries: France
- Surface area: 0.93 km^{2} (0.36 sq mi)
- Surface elevation: 210 m (690 ft)

Lac de Vaivre is an artificial lake in Vaivre-et-Montoille, in Haute-Saône, France. At an elevation of 210 m (690 ft), its surface area is 0.93 km^{2}.

== Renovation of the recreation area ==
Since 2009, the Urban community of Vesoul, then chaired by Alain Chrétien, Prime Deputy Vesoul, has undertaken important work in order to give a new face to the area of the lake, resulting in lifting improving the overall functioning spaces (path pedestrians, cyclists, traffic vehicles, access to the restaurant and camping) while preserving the natural beauty of the site, but also brought a lot of new things: pedestrian square, playground for children, terrace restaurant, expansion of parking, camping enhancement.

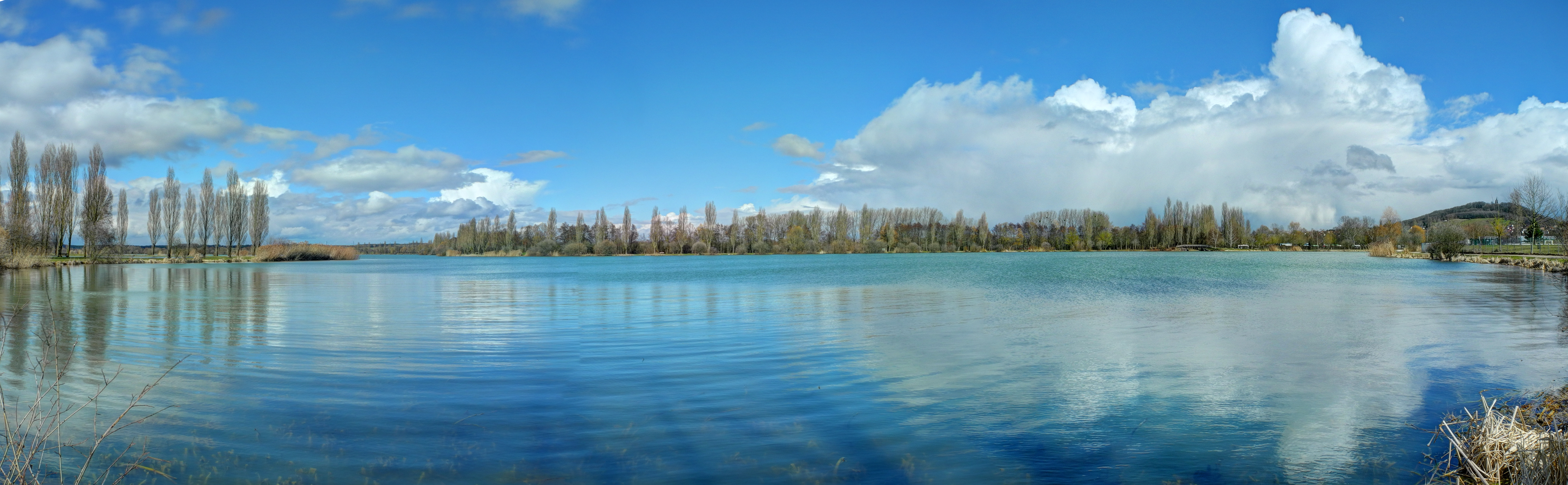
Lake of Vesoul
