= Vesoul =

- Prefecture and commune
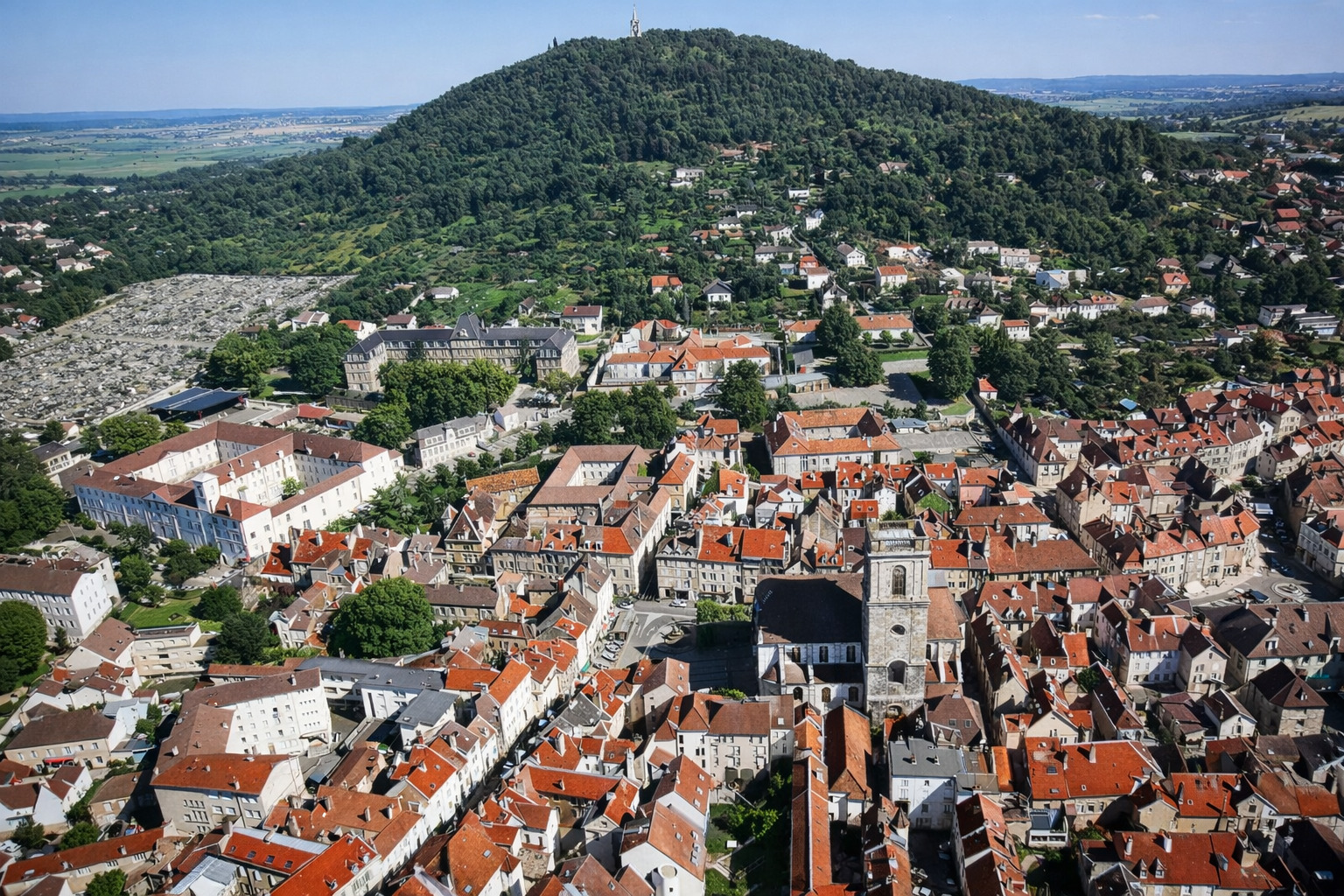
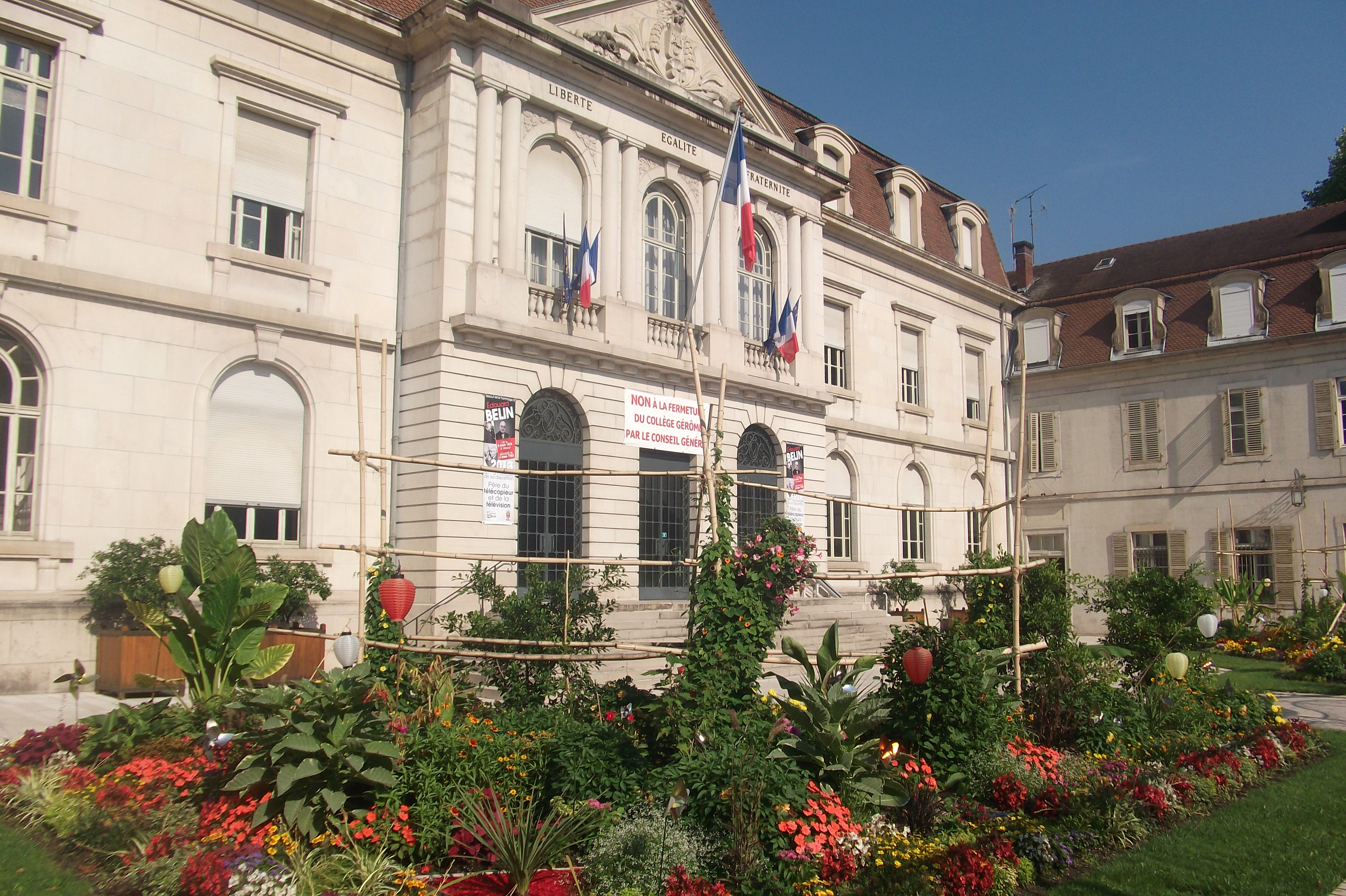
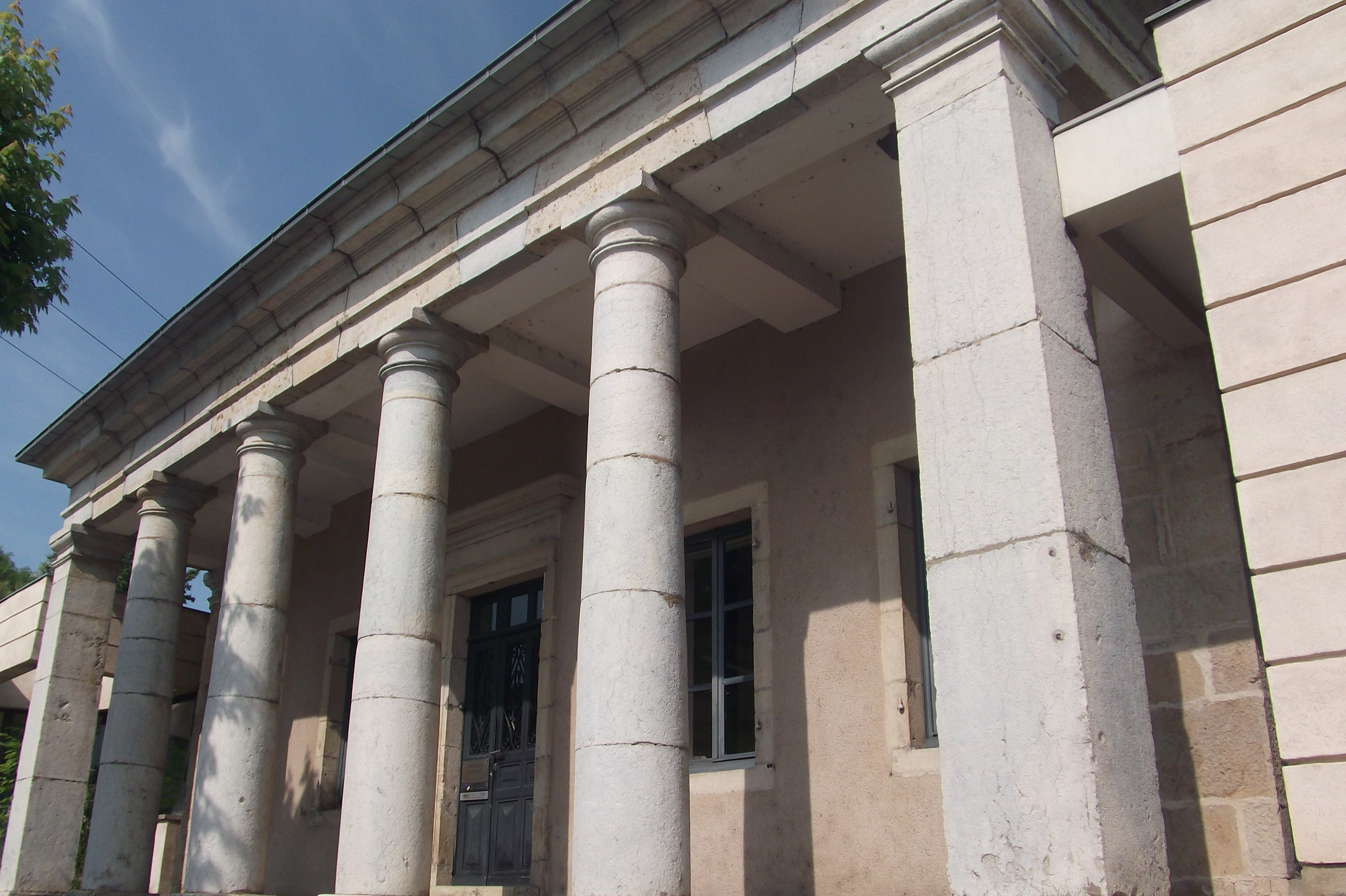
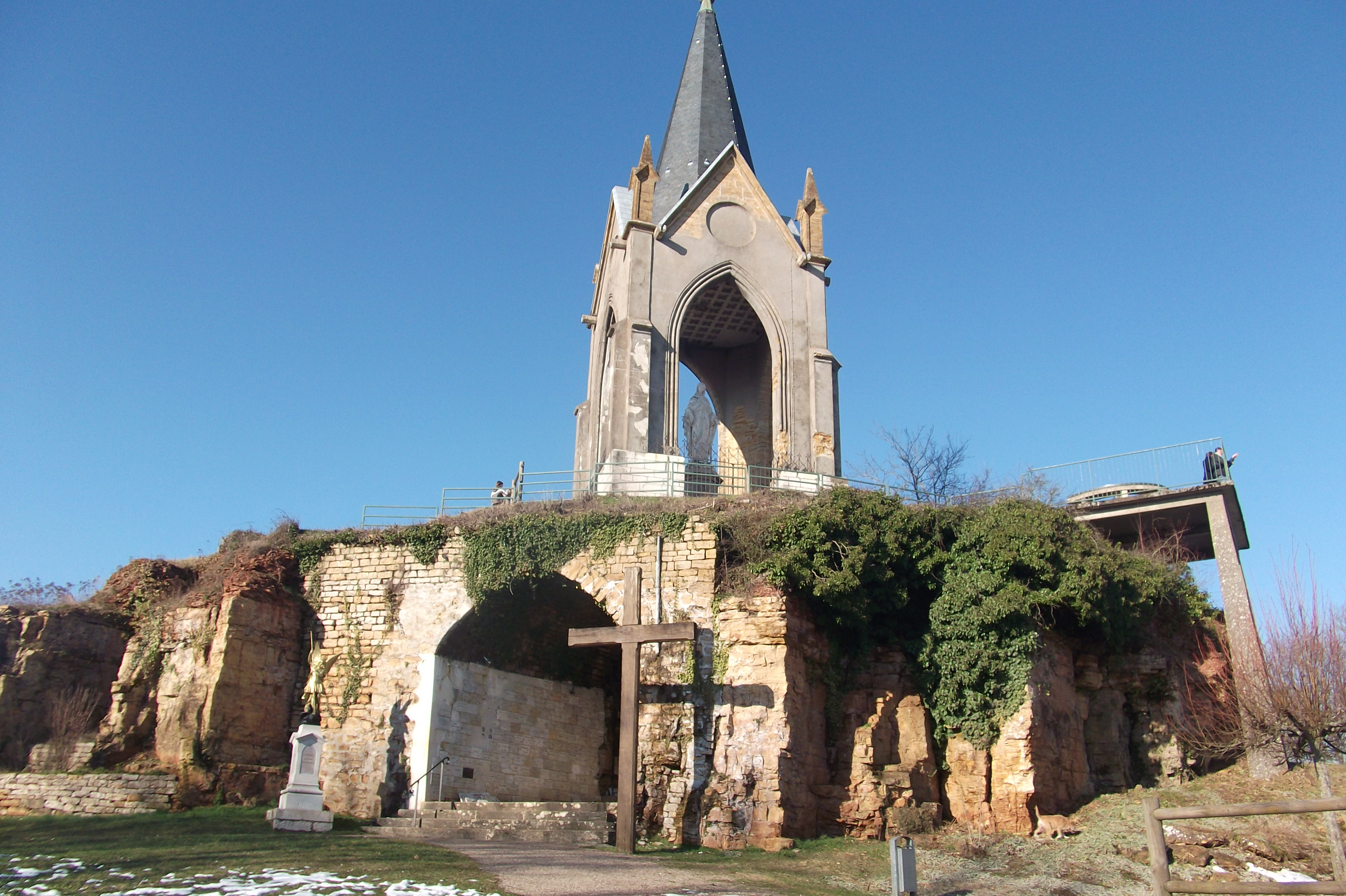
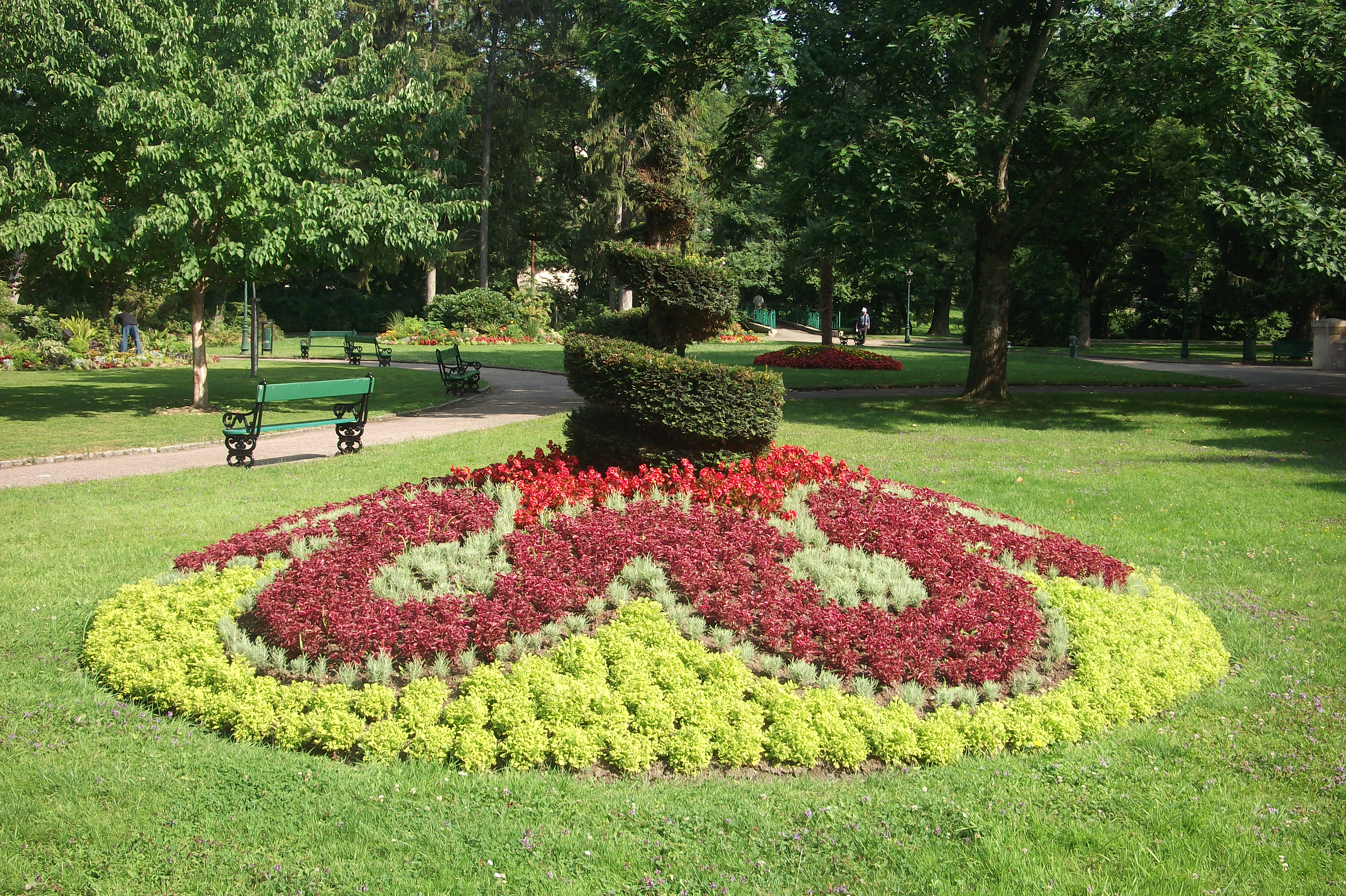
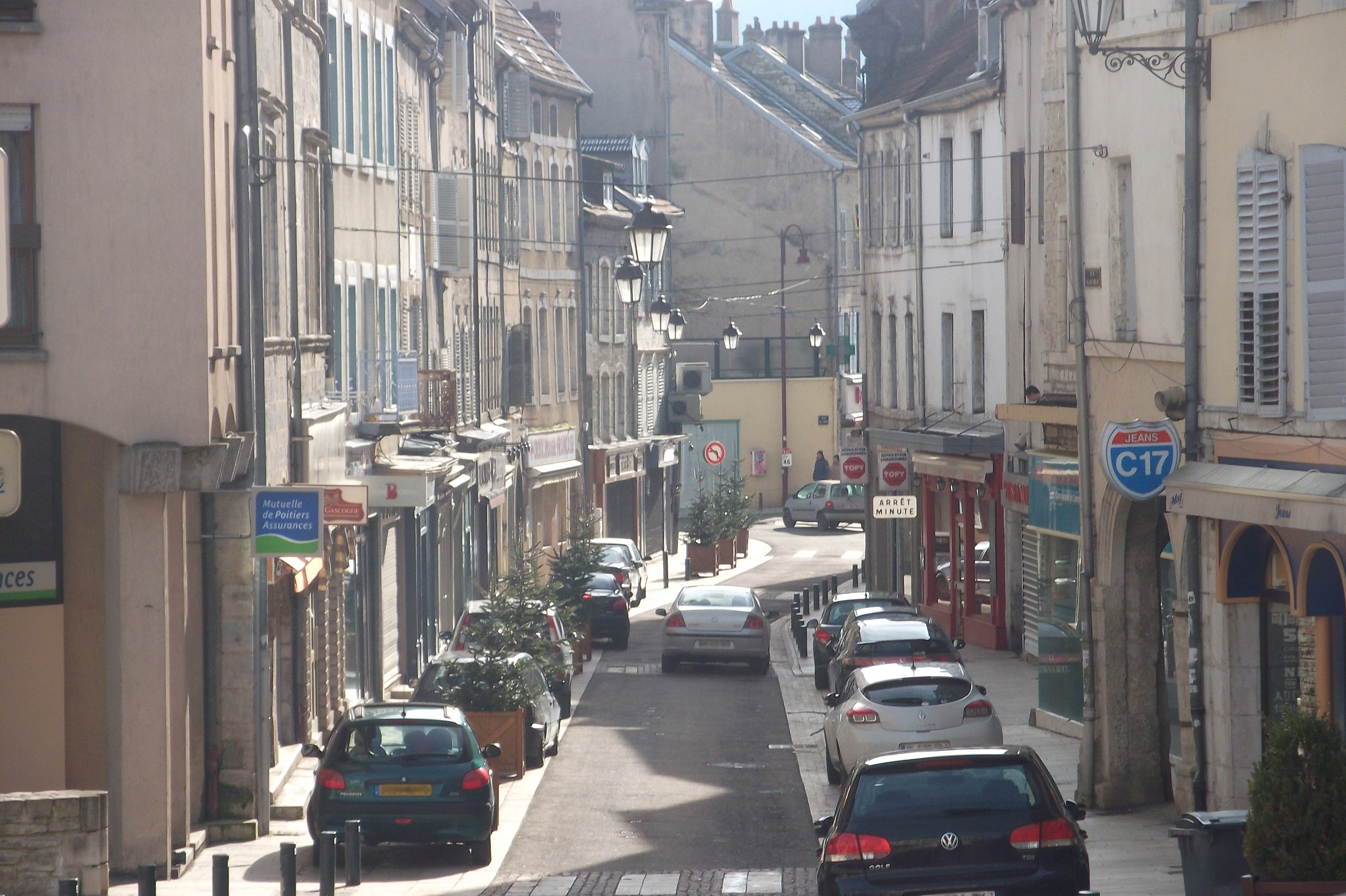
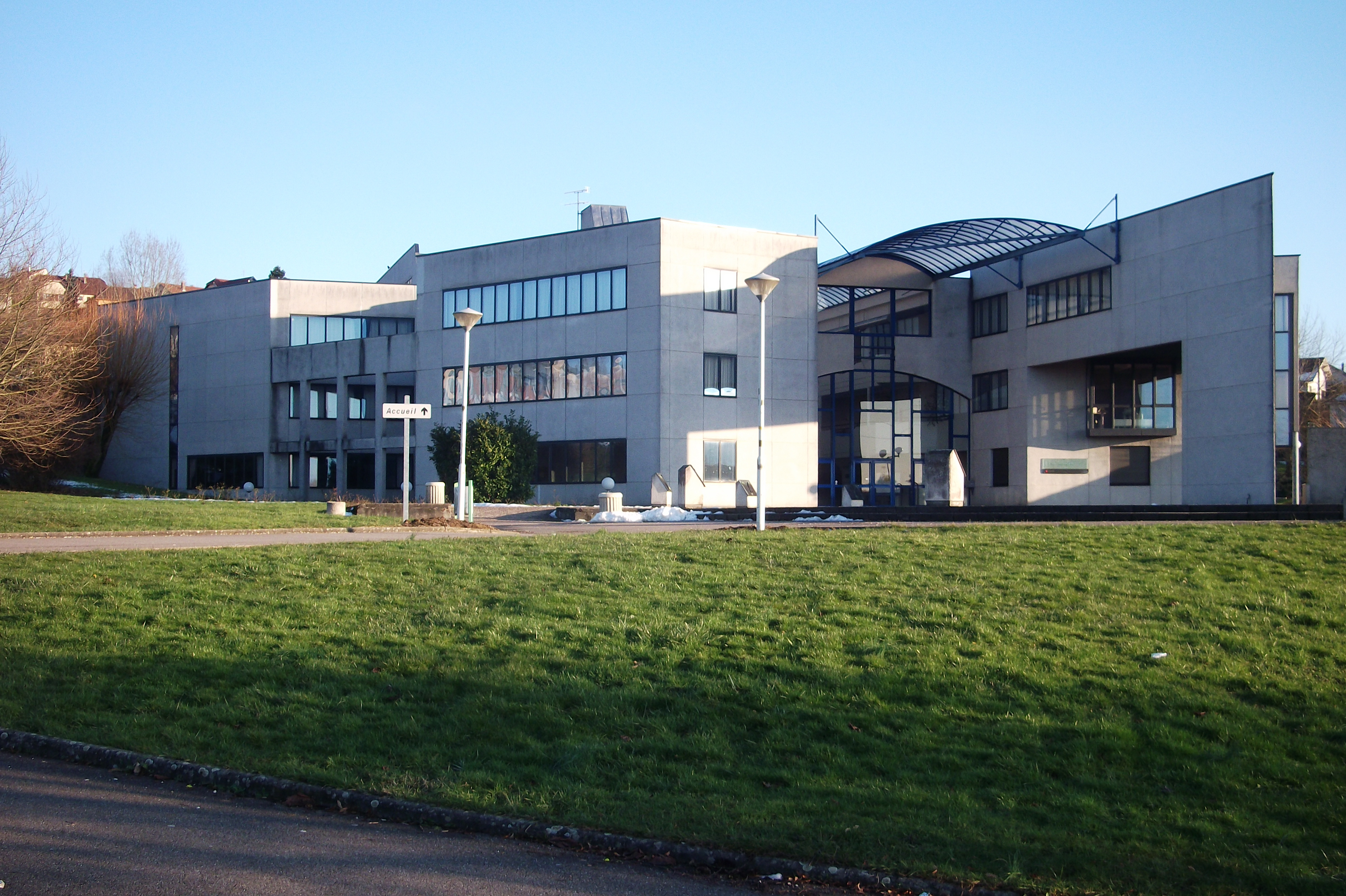
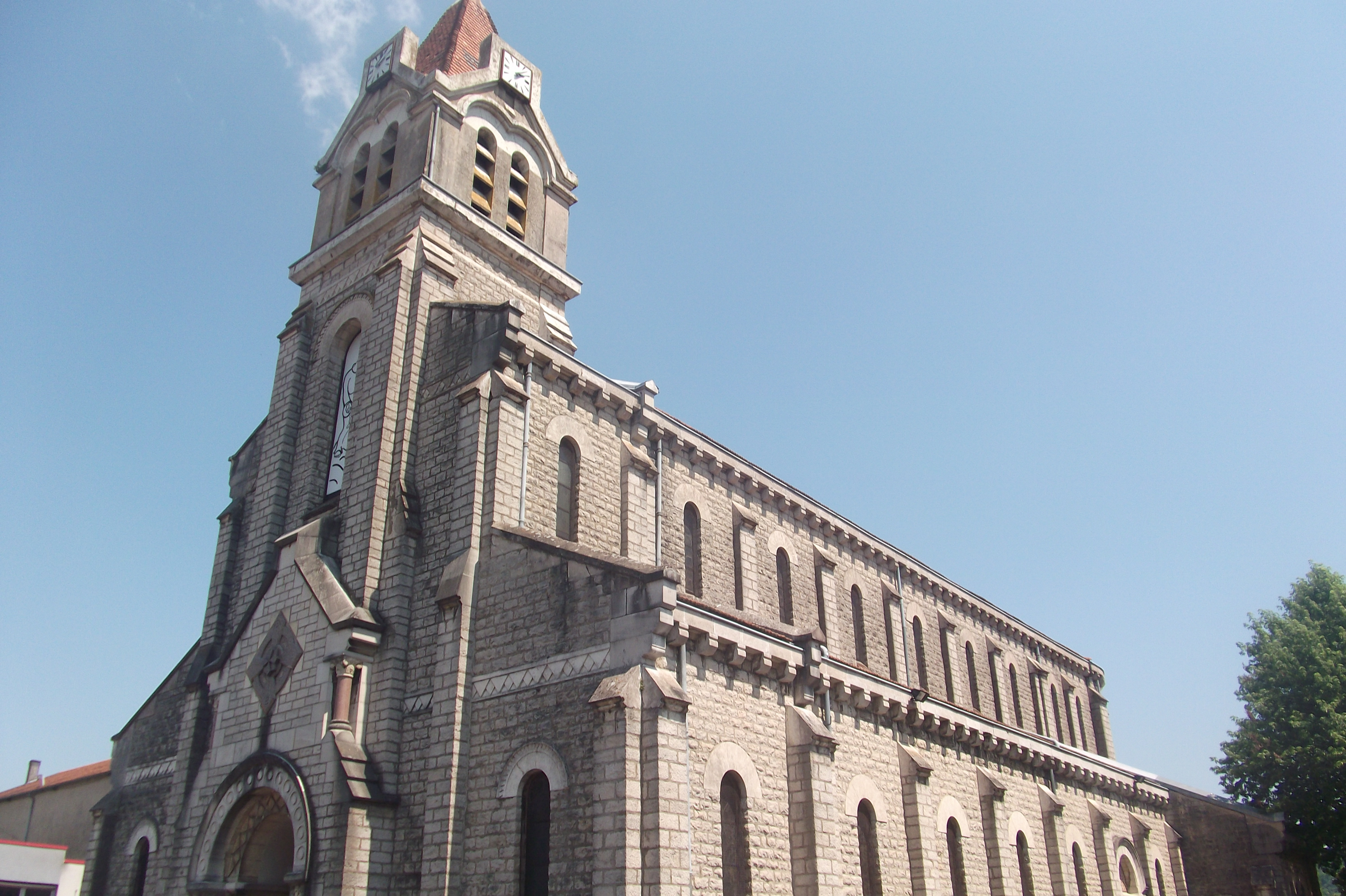

- Coat of arms
- Location of Vesoul
- Location within France Location within Bourgogne-Franche-Comté
- Coordinates: 47°37′23″N 6°09′21″E
- Country: France
- Region: Bourgogne-Franche-Comté
- Department: Haute-Saône
- Arrondissement: Vesoul
- Canton: Vesoul-1 and 2
- Intercommunality: CA Vesoul

Government
  - Mayor (2020–2026): Alain Chrétien
- Area^{1}: 9.07 km^{2} (3.50 sq mi)
- Elevation: 220 m (720 ft)
- Highest elevation: 375 m (1,230 ft)
- Lowest elevation: 213 m (699 ft)
- Population (2023): 15,078
  - Density: 1,660/km^{2} (4,310/sq mi)
- Demonym: Vésulien(ne)
- Time zone: UTC+01:00 (CET)
  - Summer (DST): UTC+02:00 (CEST)
- INSEE/Postal code: 70550 /70000
- ^{1} French Land Register data, which excludes lakes, ponds, glaciers > 1 km^{2} (0.386 sq mi or 247 acres) and river estuaries.

Vesoul (French pronunciation: [vəzul] və-ZOOL) is a commune in the predominantly rural Haute-Saône department, of which it is the prefecture, or capital, in the region of Bourgogne-Franche-Comté in eastern France.

It is the most populous municipality of the department, with 15,078 inhabitants in 2023. The Communauté d'agglomération de Vesoul, which covers 20 municipalities, together had 32,339 inhabitants (2022), while its functional area, comprising 158 municipalities, had 67,202 inhabitants. Its inhabitants are known in French as Vésuliens.

Built on top of the hill of La Motte in the first millennium under the name of Castrum Vesulium, the city gradually evolved into a European commercial and economic center. At the end of the Middle Ages, the city experienced a challenging period beset with plagues, epidemics, and localized conflict.

The main urban center of the department, Vesoul is also home to a major PSA parts manufacturing plant and to the Vesoul International Film Festival of Asian Cinema. It was immortalized by Jacques Brel in his 1968 song "Vesoul".

== History ==
Vesoul is first mentioned in a document dated 899; it describes an elevation with a fortified watchtower and speaks of "Castrum Vesulium". Castrum is a fortification, and "Vesulium" has the syllable ves which meant hill or mountain in a language that was spoken before the Celts. Today, there is a castle that forms the centre of the city. The first houses were built inside the walls of the castle. Newcomers who found no place settled outside the city walls, on the flanks of the hill. Viticulture was popular.

The town was severely affected by the plague in 1586. It became part of France in 1678.

In 1814, after the fall of the First French Empire, a buffer state was created, with Vesoul as its capital. The principality was that of Franche-Comté, of the Vosges and of Porrentruy.

Today, one of the main factories of Stellantis, formerly an installation of PSA Peugeot Citroën, is near Vesoul.

== Geography ==
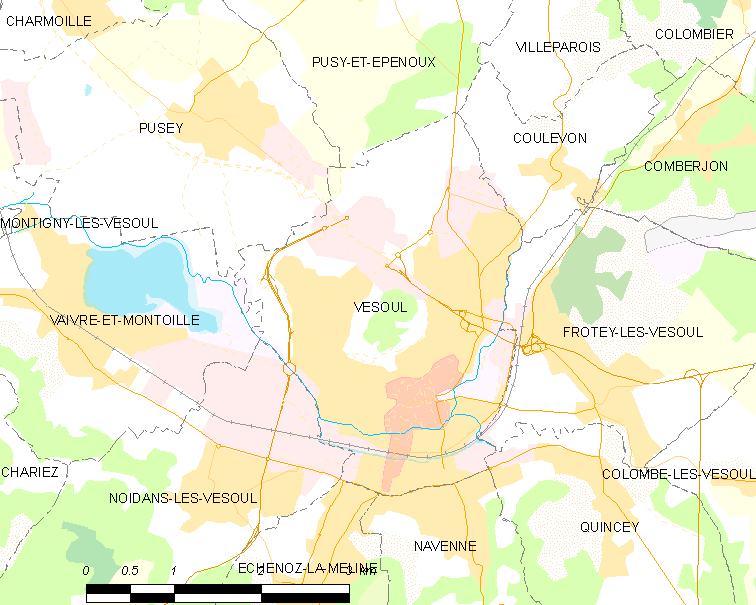
/Map of Vesoul's urban area.

Vesoul is located in eastern France, about 100 kilometers from the German and Swiss borders and between the Jura and Vosges mountain ranges. Vesoul is also situated in the center of the Haute-Saône department, which is in the north of Bourgogne-Franche-Comté. In this region, Vesoul is included in the Pays de Vesoul et du Val de Saône, a geographic region composed the Vesoul area and the northern part of the Saône valley.

By road, Vesoul is 32 kilometres (20 mi) from the towns of Luxeuil-les-Bains, 30 kilometres (19 mi) from Lure and 59 kilometres (37 mi) from Gray. Relative to the bigger cities in the French East region, Vesoul is located 50 kilometres (31 mi) from Besançon, 64 kilometres (40 mi) from Belfort, 105 kilometres (65 mi) from Dijon, and 156 kilometres (97 mi) from Nancy. Equidistant from Dijon and Mulhouse, Vesoul is 370 kilometres (230 mi) from Paris, at the intersection of national roads N19 and N57. Vesoul station is on the SNCF Paris–Mulhouse railway line, and has connections with Paris, Belfort, Mulhouse and Chaumont.

The Vesoul area is also included in the Pôle métropolitain Centre Franche-Comté which is a government structure unifying the biggest areas of central Franche-Comté. Nine communes border the town of Vesoul.

Vesoul is crossed by four watercourses: two rivers (Durgeon and Colombine) and two streams (Vaugine and Méline). All four are tributaries and sub-tributaries of the Saône, the fourth longest river in France at 473 km, and a tributary of the Rhone, which flows at about ten kilometers to the west of Vesoul.

== Governance and politics ==
=== Twin towns ===
- Gerlingen, Germany, since 1964

=== Administrative division ===
- Arrondissement of Vesoul
- Canton of Vesoul-1
- Canton of Vesoul-2

== Population and society ==
- Jean-Michel Nicolier ( 1 July 1966 – 20/21 November 1991), French volunteer in the Croatian War of Independence who was killed in the Vukovar massacre
- Sophie Bouillon (born 1984), independent journalist, winner of the 2009 Albert Londres Prize.

=== Demography ===
Historical population

Year	Pop.	±% p.a.
1793	5,303	—
1800	5,417	+0.30%
1806	5,708	+0.88%
1821	5,391	−0.38%
1831	5,408	+0.03%
1836	5,887	+1.71%
1841	6,788	+2.89%
1846	5,941	−2.63%
1851	6,621	+2.19%
1856	7,281	+1.92%
1861	7,579	+0.81%
1866	7,614	+0.09%
1872	7,716	+0.22%

Year	Pop.	±% p.a.
1876	9,206	+4.51%
1881	9,553	+0.74%
1886	9,733	+0.37%
1891	9,770	+0.08%
1896	10,083	+0.63%
1901	9,704	−0.76%
1906	10,163	+0.93%
1911	10,539	+0.73%
1921	10,471	−0.06%
1926	10,859	+0.73%
1931	11,562	+1.26%
1936	11,926	+0.62%
1946	11,825	−0.09%

Year	Pop.	±% p.a.
1954	12,038	+0.22%
1962	13,678	+1.61%
1968	16,352	+3.02%
1975	18,173	+1.52%
1982	18,412	+0.19%
1990	17,614	−0.55%
1999	17,168	−0.28%
2007	16,329	−0.62%
2012	15,637	−0.86%
2017	14,916	−0.94%
2023	15,078	+0.18%

Source: Ehess and INSEE

=== Media ===
Vesoul is also the name of a song by Jacques Brel from 1968, a fast-paced waltz during the recording of which Brel famously yelled "Chauffe, Marcel, chauffe!" ("heat up, Marcel, heat up!") at his accordionist, Marcel Azzola.

The town is also mentioned facetiously in the satirical rap Fous ta cagoule by Michael Youn.

=== Sport ===
- FC Vesoul, football club
- Stade René Hologne
- Cercle de Judo de Vesoul, Judo club with a competitors section

=== Education ===
Vesoul has schools of higher education. The city has 1,200 students divided between an IUT, an IUFM, an Institute of Nursing Training, a School of Management and Commerce and BTS.
A Council of Student Life (CVE), led by the Officer in charge of Higher Education, was established in 2011. It offers activities to stimulate student life. In all, Vesoul has 10,000 students.

All schools and studies in Vesoul

Kindergarten: Kindergarten Small; Kindergarten Saint Exupery; Kindergarten Montmarin II; Kindergarten Bank; Kindergarten Jean Morel; Kindergarten the Grand Sleet; Kindergarten Stadium; Kindergarten Lafayette	Primary School: Elementary School South ERfKE; Elementary School Pablo Picasso-; Boulevard Elementary School; Elementary school-Henri Matisse; Elementary School Stadium; Elementary School of Luxembourg; Elementary School of Marteroy	Public College: College Jean-Leon Gerome; College Jean-Macé; College-Jacques Brel; College René-Cassin; Private College: College Marteroy	General and Technical High School: Lycée les Haberges; Lycée Edouard Belin; LEGTA Munier-Etienne; Vocational College: High School Pontarcher; High School Luxembourg; Apprentice Training Centre: C.F.A. of Haute Saône	Studies senior: IUT (University Institute of Technology); IUFM (University Institute of Teacher Training); IFSM (Institute of Nursing Education); CGE (School of Management and Commerce)

== Culture and heritage ==
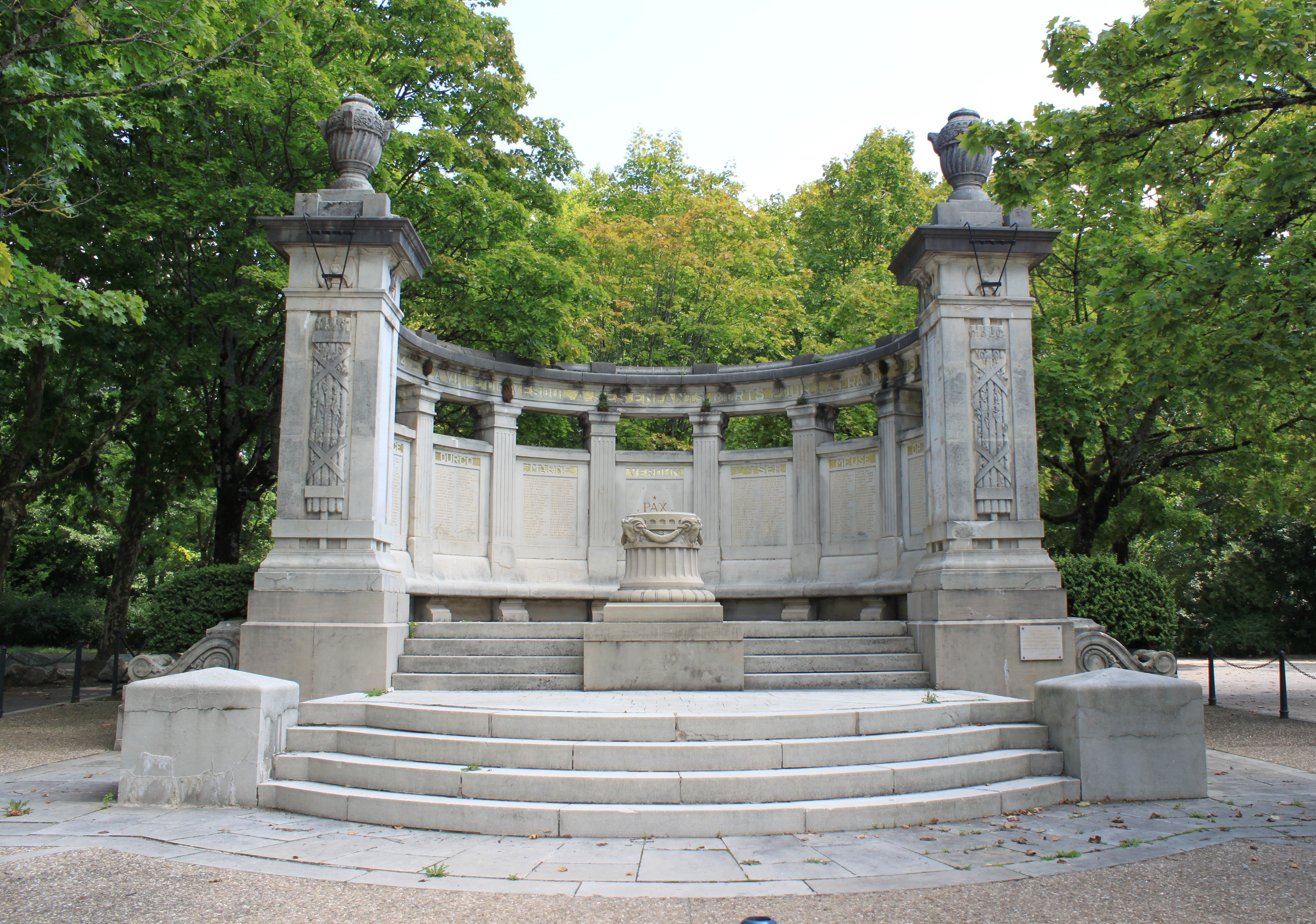
Monuments to the dead of the war 14-18

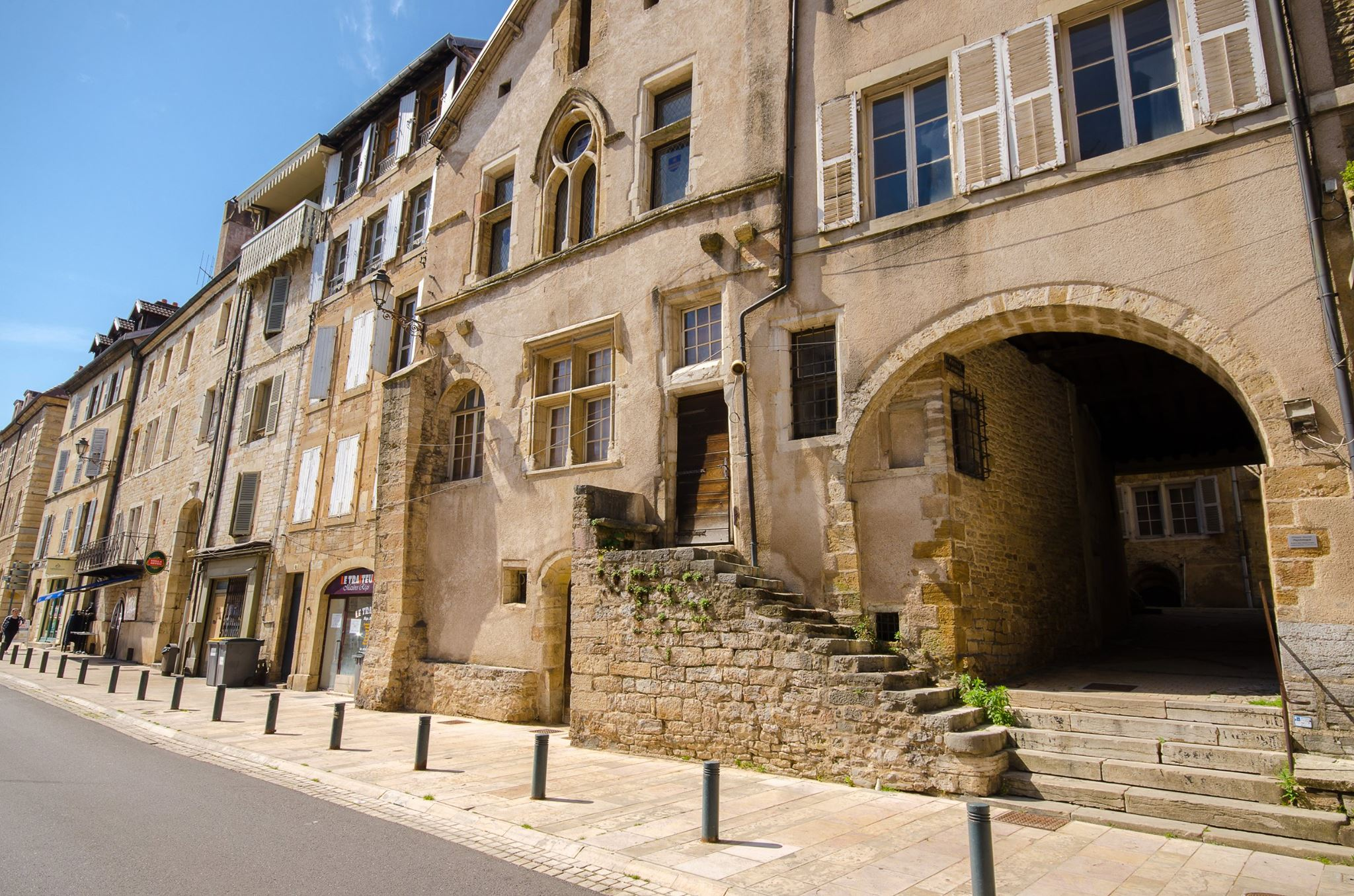
Hotel Baressols

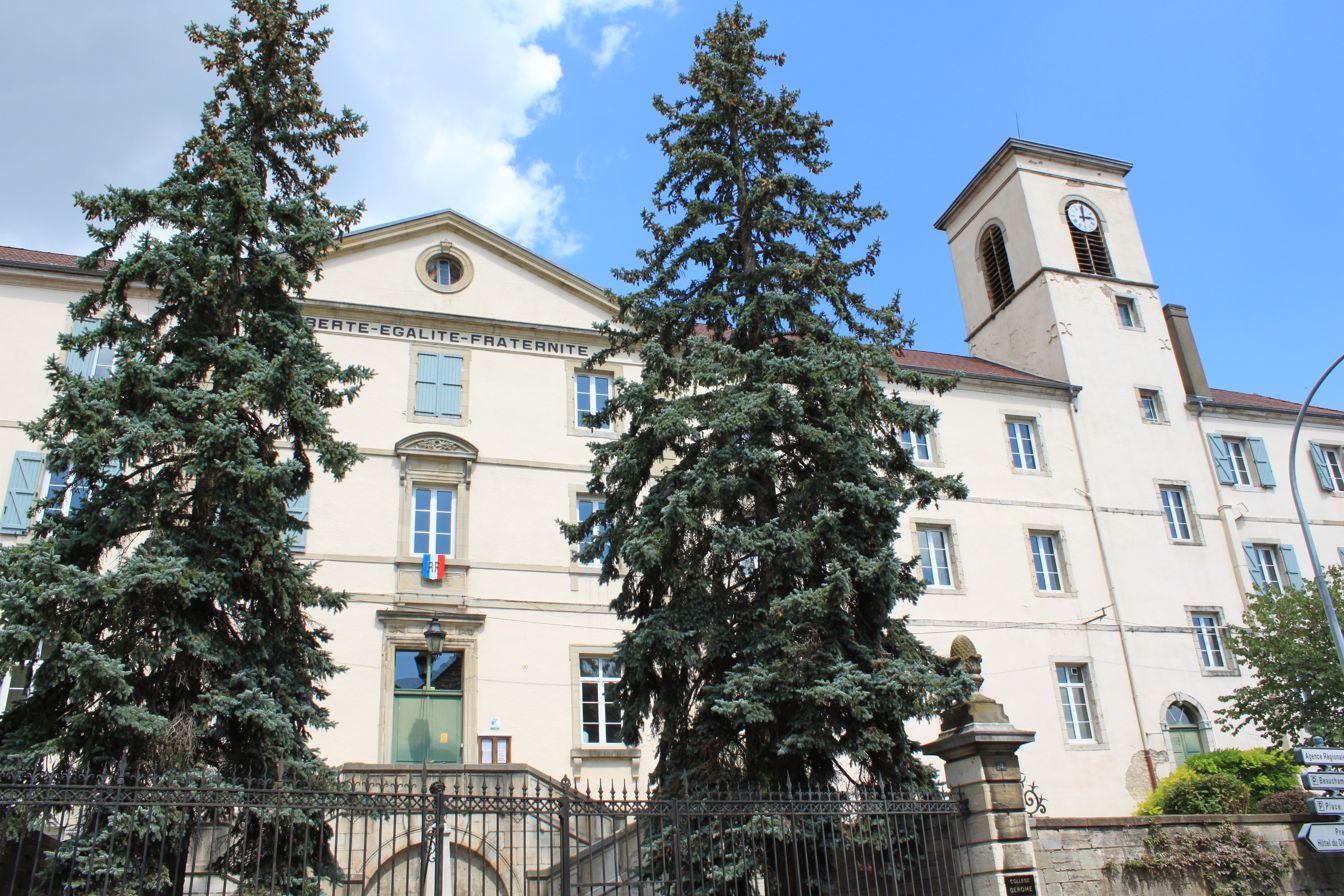
The Jean-Léon Gérôme Collège

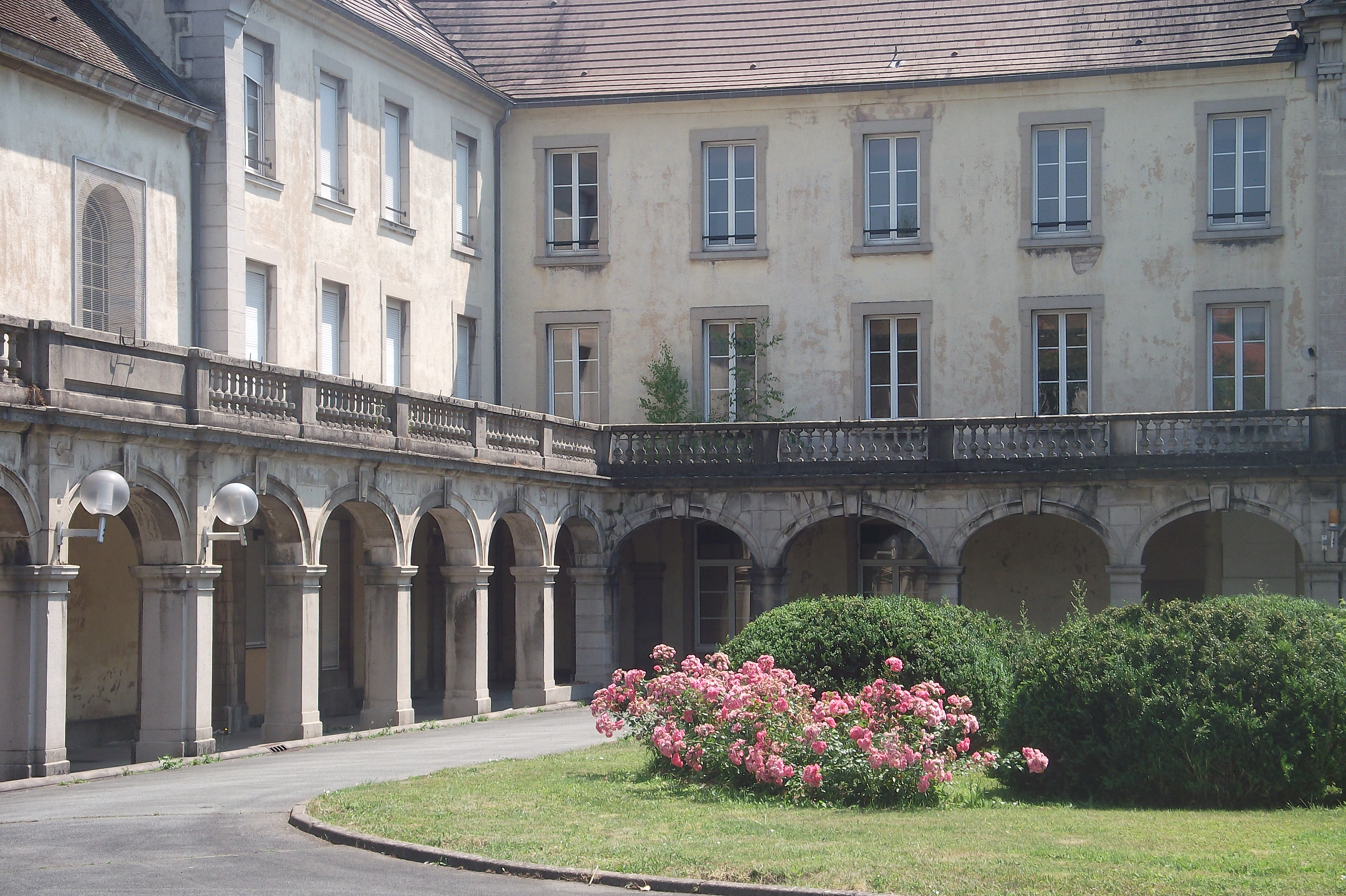
Hôpital Paul-Morel

=== Monuments and tourist attractions ===
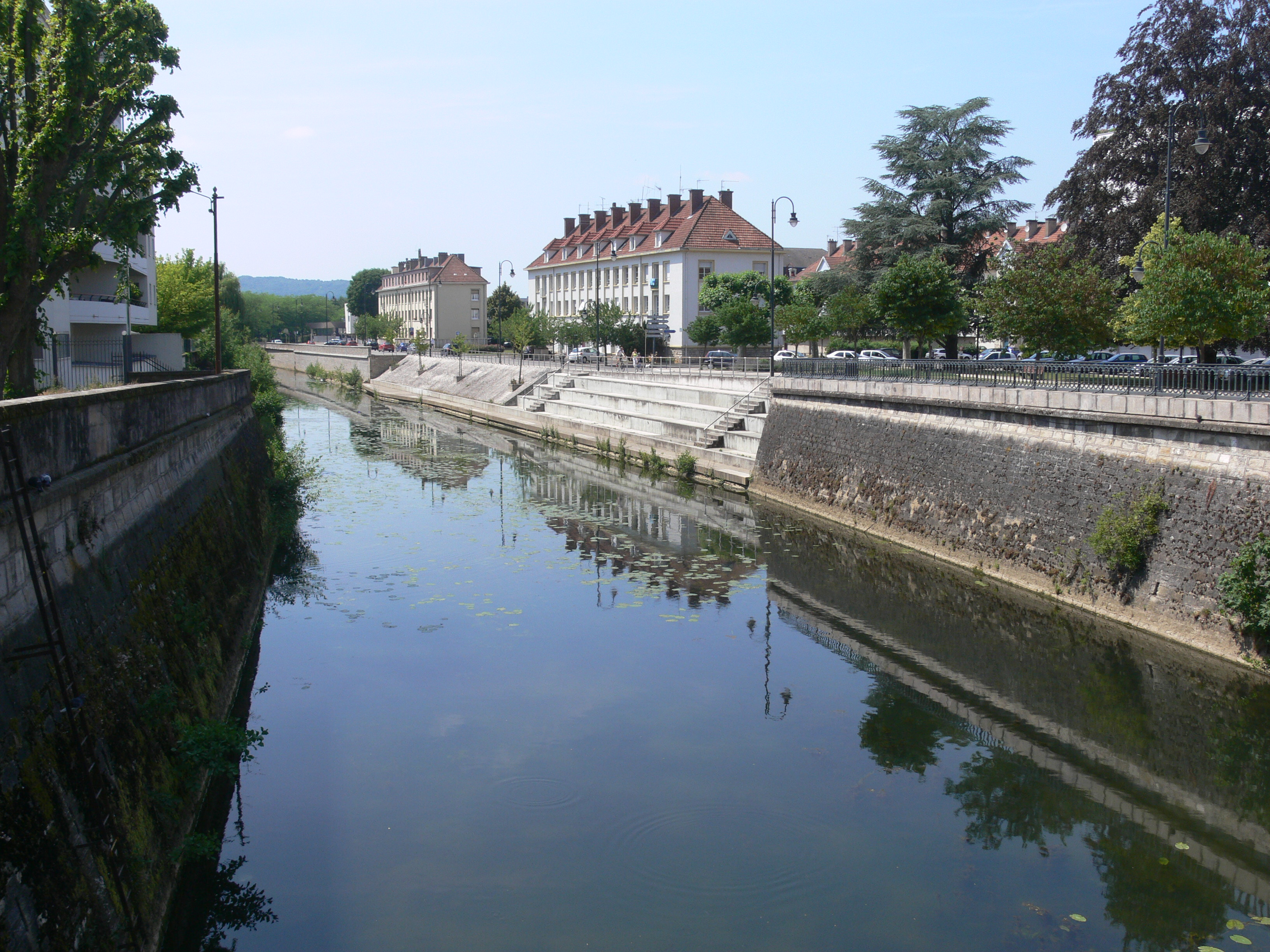
The Durgeon

- Vieux Vesoul (Old Vesoul) (buildings from the 15th, 16th and 18th centuries and Garret Museum)
- Site of Vesoul's Motte
- Site of the Sabot de Frotey
- Lake of Vesoul - Vaivre
- Vesoul-Vaivre Vélo-rail
- Convent of the Ursulines (17th century)
- St. George's Church, Vesoul
- Gare de Vesoul
- PSA Vesoul Plant
- Synagogue of Vesoul
- Musée Georges-Garret
- Notre-Dame-de-la-Motte
- Paul Morel Hospital
- Lac de Vesoul - Vaivre

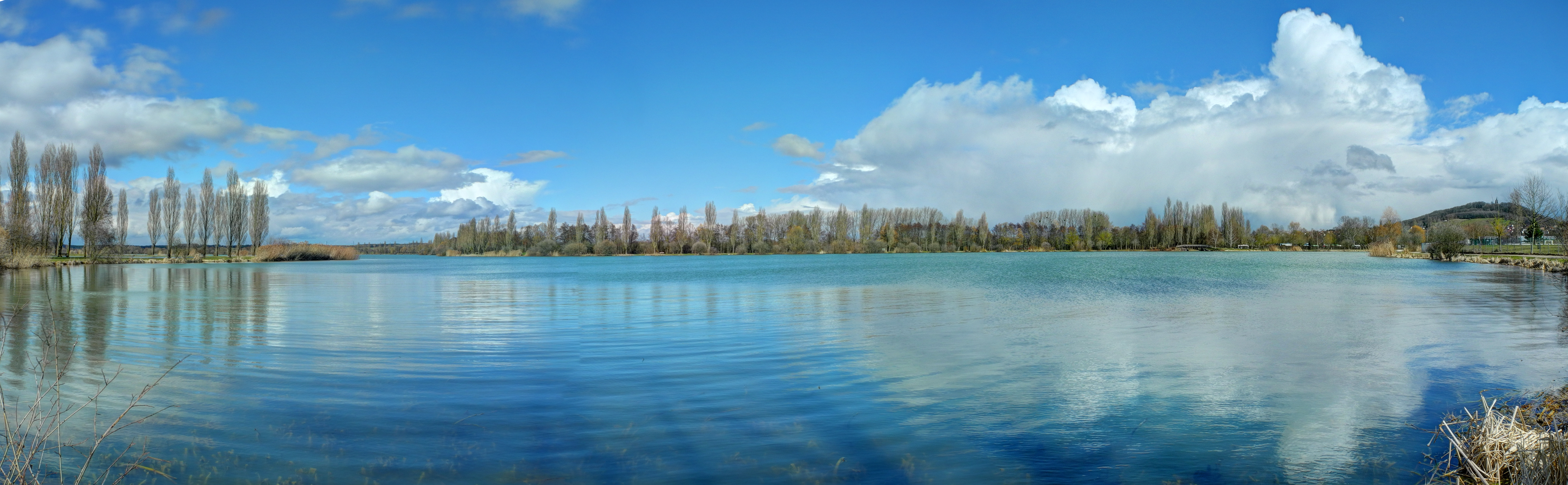
Lake of Vesoul

=== Festival ===
- Vesoul International Film Festival of Asian Cinema

=== Library ===
The first public library of Vesoul opened in 1771. The abbé (abbot) Bardenet, superior of the Saint-Esprit hospital in Besançon, gave his book collection to the town. There were 1772 books. The collections became a lot larger with the Revolution. At that time, the revolutionaries (people who led the French Revolution) took the books from the monasteries of the town (capucins) and even of the region (Luxeuil and Faverney monasteries). Around 20,000 books were added to the library this way, including some 11th century manuscripts. The Mayor's office was responsible for keeping the books.

In 1981, the municipality decided to build a new building to encourage the public to read. The library was recently equipped with computers. There are around 200 manuscripts and 150 incunables.

=== Areas ===
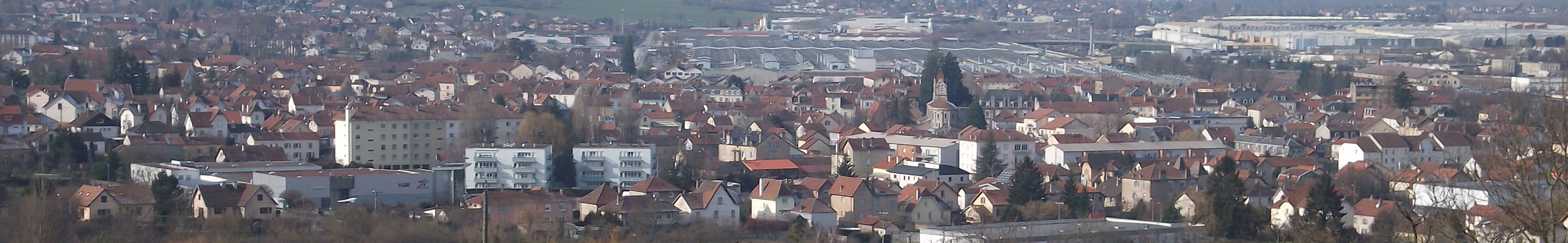
Jean Jaurès-Petit-Banque area

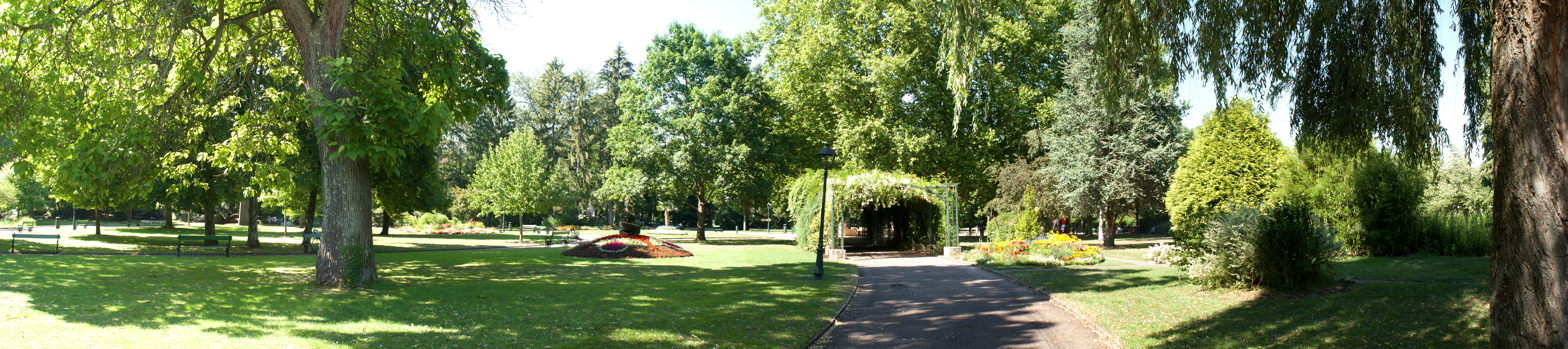
Anglais Garden Park

Neighborhoods: Rêpes-Pontarcher; Grand Montmarin; Vesoul Ouest; Vesoul Centre Nord-Saint-Ferjeux; Grand Grésil; Stade; Vesoul Centre Sud; Jean Jaurès-Petit-Banque	Sectors : Vieux-Vesoul; Les Bains; Pontarcher; Taillevanne; Haberges; Saint-Martin; Grand Miselot; Saint-Maur; Luxembourg	Commercial areas : Espace de la Motte; Pôle Santé de Vesoul; Oasis; Kennedy; Halles de Vesoul; Paul-Morel	Industrial areas : Vesoul Technologia; PSA; Poincaré; Les Saussis	Spaces : La Motte; Jardin anglais; Plateau de Cita; Les Rives du Lac; Sabot de Frotey

=== Notable people ===
- René de Boisdeffre
- Jean-Léon Gérôme
- Raymond Aubrac
- Édouard Belin
- Edwige Feuillère
- Charles Grandmougin
- Arthur Constantin Krebs
- Laurent Mangel
- Jean Pierre Marie Orchampt
- Robert Schurrer
- Stéphane Peterhansel
- Albert Cartier
- Abel Khaled
- Jean-Baptiste Humbert
- Alain Joyandet
- Yves Krattinger
- Mickaël Ravaux
- Jean-Xavier Bureau de Pusy
- Georges Cogniot
- Théodule-Armand Ribot
- Albert Mathiez
- Jean Peyrière
- Julien Casoli
- Amédée Simon Dominique Thierry
- Affo Erassa
- Jean Compagnon
- Cédric Si Mohamed
- Katty Piejos
- Vincent Luis
- Frédéric Vichot
- Pascal Dagnan-Bouveret
- Jean-Michel Nicollier
- Pape Mamadou Diouf
- Roger Munier
- Jean-Joseph Gaume

== Awards ==
- Vesoul inaugurated the first Cyber Base France in 1999
- Voted "most athletic city of France" in 2001
- Labeled "Child Friendly City" by UNICEF in 2006. This label was renewed in 2009.
- Labeled "friendly and inclusive City" in 2010
- Labeled "Cities and villages in bloom" and has 3 flowers
- Labeled "QualiTri Collection" in 2012
- Vesoul is the second city in France to obtain ISO 14001 certification

== Climate ==
Climate data for Vesoul Ville (1991–2020 normals, extremes 1959–present)
Month	Jan	Feb	Mar	Apr	May	Jun	Jul	Aug	Sep	Oct	Nov	Dec	Year
Record high °C (°F)	18.9 (66.0)	23.0 (73.4)	26.5 (79.7)	29.5 (85.1)	33.5 (92.3)	38.5 (101.3)	40.5 (104.9)	40.5 (104.9)	33.8 (92.8)	29.5 (85.1)	24.0 (75.2)	20.0 (68.0)	40.5 (104.9)
Mean daily maximum °C (°F)	6.3 (43.3)	8.3 (46.9)	13.1 (55.6)	17.3 (63.1)	21.2 (70.2)	25.0 (77.0)	27.2 (81.0)	26.9 (80.4)	22.2 (72.0)	16.9 (62.4)	10.6 (51.1)	6.8 (44.2)	16.8 (62.2)
Daily mean °C (°F)	2.9 (37.2)	3.9 (39.0)	7.5 (45.5)	10.8 (51.4)	14.9 (58.8)	18.6 (65.5)	20.6 (69.1)	20.3 (68.5)	16.1 (61.0)	12.0 (53.6)	6.8 (44.2)	3.6 (38.5)	11.5 (52.7)
Mean daily minimum °C (°F)	−0.4 (31.3)	−0.5 (31.1)	1.8 (35.2)	4.4 (39.9)	8.5 (47.3)	12.1 (53.8)	14.0 (57.2)	13.7 (56.7)	9.9 (49.8)	7.0 (44.6)	3.0 (37.4)	0.3 (32.5)	6.2 (43.2)
Record low °C (°F)	−22.2 (−8.0)	−18.5 (−1.3)	−15.5 (4.1)	−7.0 (19.4)	−2.9 (26.8)	0.5 (32.9)	2.8 (37.0)	2.5 (36.5)	−1.2 (29.8)	−6.0 (21.2)	−10.5 (13.1)	−18.5 (−1.3)	−22.2 (−8.0)
Average precipitation mm (inches)	80.9 (3.19)	71.9 (2.83)	69.7 (2.74)	68.5 (2.70)	98.1 (3.86)	85.0 (3.35)	83.9 (3.30)	80.1 (3.15)	80.6 (3.17)	94.7 (3.73)	96.8 (3.81)	97.5 (3.84)	1,007.7 (39.67)
Average precipitation days (≥ 1.0 mm)	13.0	11.6	10.9	10.3	12.4	10.2	10.5	9.8	9.7	12.3	12.7	14.0	137.5
Source: Meteociel

== See also ==
- Communes of the Haute-Saône department
- Sabot de Frotey National Nature Reserve
