= Vézelise =

- Commune
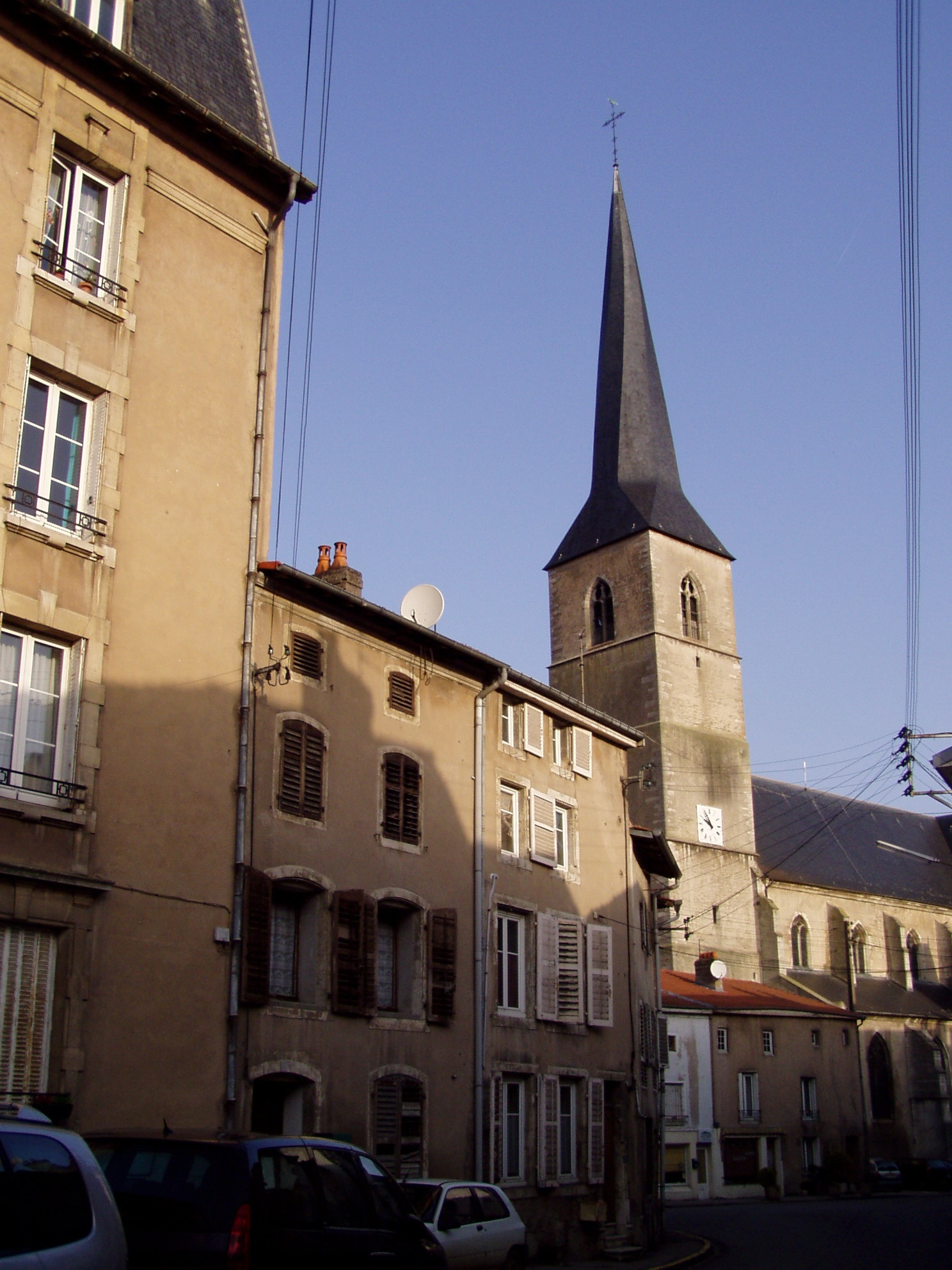
- Around the church

- Coat of arms
- Location of Vézelise
- Location within France Location within Grand Est
- Coordinates: 48°29′15″N 6°05′19″E
- Country: France
- Region: Grand Est
- Department: Meurthe-et-Moselle
- Arrondissement: Nancy
- Canton: Meine au Saintois
- Intercommunality: CC Pays du Saintois

Government
  - Mayor (2020–2026): Stéphane Colin
- Area^{1}: 5.35 km^{2} (2.07 sq mi)
- Elevation: 260 m (850 ft)
- Highest elevation: 313 m (1,027 ft)
- Lowest elevation: 245 m (804 ft)
- Population (2023): 1,346
  - Density: 252/km^{2} (652/sq mi)
- Time zone: UTC+01:00 (CET)
  - Summer (DST): UTC+02:00 (CEST)
- INSEE/Postal code: 54563 /54330
- ^{1} French Land Register data, which excludes lakes, ponds, glaciers > 1 km^{2} (0.386 sq mi or 247 acres) and river estuaries.

Vézelise (French pronunciation: [vez(ə)liz]) is a commune in the Meurthe-et-Moselle department in north-eastern France.

== See also ==
- Communes of the Meurthe-et-Moselle department
