= Vaivre-et-Montoille =

- Commune
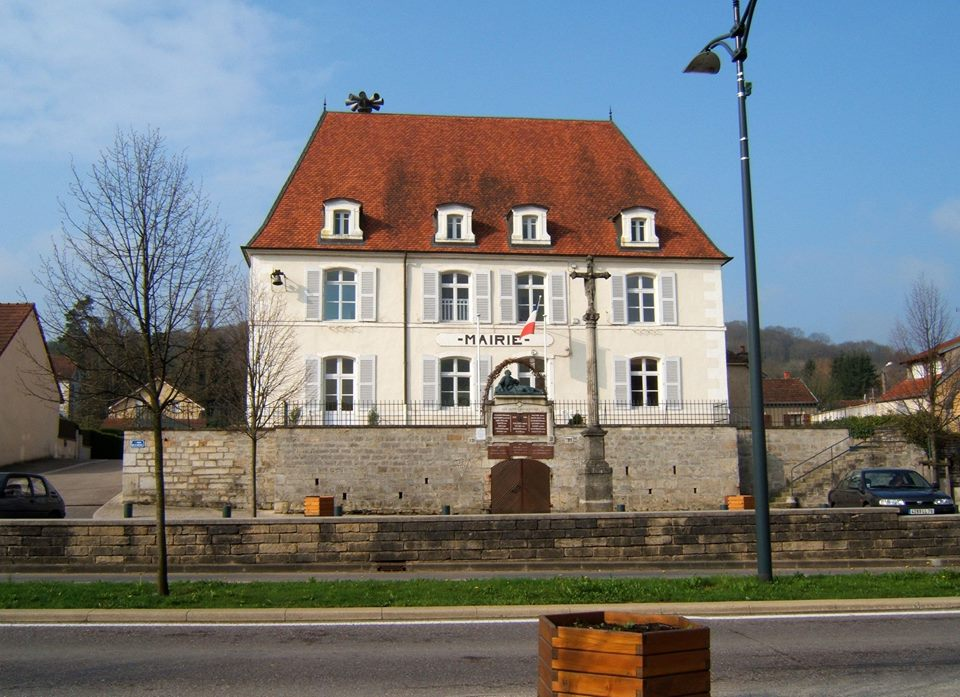
- The town hall in Vaivre-et-Montoille

- Coat of arms
- Location of Vaivre-et-Montoille
- Location within France Location within Bourgogne-Franche-Comté
- Coordinates: 47°37′53″N 6°06′18″E
- Country: France
- Region: Bourgogne-Franche-Comté
- Department: Haute-Saône
- Arrondissement: Vesoul
- Canton: Vesoul-1
- Intercommunality: CA Vesoul
- Area^{1}: 8.48 km^{2} (3.27 sq mi)
- Highest elevation: 380 m (1,250 ft)
- Lowest elevation: 212 m (696 ft)
- Population (2023): 2,422
  - Density: 286/km^{2} (740/sq mi)
- Time zone: UTC+01:00 (CET)
  - Summer (DST): UTC+02:00 (CEST)
- INSEE/Postal code: 70513 /70000
- ^{1} French Land Register data, which excludes lakes, ponds, glaciers > 1 km^{2} (0.386 sq mi or 247 acres) and river estuaries.

Vaivre-et-Montoille is a commune in the Haute-Saône department in the region of Bourgogne-Franche-Comté in eastern France. The city is commonly known for its lake.

The town is located near Vesoul.

== Population ==
Historical population
Year	Pop.	±% p.a.
1968	604	—
1975	747	+3.08%
1982	1,854	+13.87%
1990	2,469	+3.65%
1999	2,691	+0.96%
2007	2,339	−1.74%
2012	2,311	−0.24%
2017	2,417	+0.90%
2023	2,422	+0.03%
Source: INSEE

== See also ==
- Communes of the Haute-Saône department
- Communauté d'agglomération de Vesoul
- Arrondissement of Vesoul
