= Results of the 2024 French legislative election in Haute-Saône =

Following the first round of the 2024 French legislative election on 30 June 2024, runoff elections in each constituency where no candidate received a vote share greater than 50 percent were scheduled for 7 July. Candidates permitted to stand in the runoff elections needed to either come in first or second place in the first round or achieve more than 12.5 percent of the votes of the entire electorate (as opposed to 12.5 percent of the vote share due to low turnout).

== Haute-Saône ==
=== 1st constituency ===
Candidate	Party or alliance		First round		Second round	
Candidate	Party or alliance		Votes	%	Votes	%
Antoine Villedieu	National Rally		29,459	48.82	32,044	53.54
Alain Chrétien	Ensemble	Horizons	18,093	29.99	27,812	46.46
Sébastien Poyard	New Popular Front	La France Insoumise	10,362	17.17		
Mohamed-Salah Zelfa	Independent		906	1.50		
Cédric Fischer	Far-left	Lutte Ouvrière	816	1.35		
Philippe Ghiles	Reconquête		701	1.16		
Total			60,337	100.00	59,856	100.00
Valid votes			60,337	96.52	59,856	94.99
Invalid votes			947	1.51	1,112	1.76
Blank votes			1,227	1.96	2,043	3.24
Total votes			62,511	100.00	63,011	100.00
Registered voters/turnout			88,355	70.75	88,348	71.32

=== 2nd constituency ===
Candidate	Party or alliance		Votes	%
Emeric Salmon	National Rally		30,315	50.11
Eric Houlley	New Popular Front	Socialist Party	13,632	22.53
Fabrice Barassi Zamochnikoff	Ensemble	Renaissance	8,354	13.81
Loïc Laborie	The Republicans		6,600	10.91
Isabelle Apro	Far-left	Lutte Ouvrière	1,018	1.68
Christophe Devillers	Reconquête		579	0.96
Total			60,498	100.00
Valid votes			60,498	96.36
Invalid votes			1,082	1.72
Blank votes			1,201	1.91
Total votes			62,781	100.00
Registered voters/turnout			89,378	70.24
