= Jean-Pierre Michel =

French politician (1938–2021)

Member of the French Senate for Haute-Saône
- In office 1 October 2004 – 1 October 2014
- Preceded by: Bernard Joly
- Succeeded by: Michel Raison; Alain Joyandet

Mayor of Héricourt
- In office 13 March 1983 – 30 September 2004
- Preceded by: André Girard
- Succeeded by: Jean-Michel Villaumé

Member of the National Assembly from Haute-Saône's 2nd constituency
- In office 23 June 1988 – 18 June 2002
- Preceded by: Proportional representation
- Succeeded by: Maryvonne Briot
- In office 2 July 1981 – 1 April 1986
- Preceded by: Jean-Jacques Beucler
- Succeeded by: Proportional representation

Personal details
- Born: 5 August 1938 Nîmes, France
- Died: 24 January 2021 (aged 82) Trévenans, France
- Party: Socialist Party
- Spouse: Myriam Michel

Jean-Pierre Michel (5 August 1938 – 24 January 2021) was a member of the Senate of France, representing the Haute-Saône department from 2004 to 2014. He was a member of the Socialist Party. In 2014 he ran for a second term, but lost by a 57%-34% margin to Alain Joyandet and by a 60%-34% margin to mayor Michel Raison.

Michel died on 24 January 2021 at the age of 82.

== Political career ==
As part of the study of the bill opening marriage to same-sex couples, as rapporteur of the Committee on Laws, he declared on February 13, 2013: "Me, my position is that something is just [or fair] because that's what the law says, that's all. And the law does not refer to some natural order. It refers to a given balance of power at some point in time, period, nothing else." The philosopher Thibaud Collin interjects: "Ah, I see, the basis of justice is thus the result of a balance of power?" And the socialist rapporteur concludes: "This is my point of view, it is the Marxist point of view on law."(Starting at 1:40:01 in the full video of the committee hearing on 13 February 2013, can be found on YouTube but not linked to.)

== Electoral history ==
Haute-Saône Senate Election 2014
| Party | Candidate | Votes | % | ±% |
|---|---|---|---|---|
| UMP | Michel Raison | 560 | 59.77 | |
| UMP | Alain Joyandet | 535 | 57.10 | |
| PS | Jean-Pierre Michel | 317 | 33.83 | |
| PS | Jean-Pierre Chausse | 313 | 33.40 | |
| Majority | | | | |
| Turnout | | 960 | 98.77 | |
| UMP gain from PS | | Swing | | |

Haute-Saône Senate Election 2004 (Runoff)
| Party | Candidate | Votes | % | ±% |
|---|---|---|---|---|
| PS | Jean-Pierre Michel | 465 | 50.11 | |
| UMP | Marie-Odile Hagemann | 463 | 49.89 | |
| Majority | | 2 | 0.22 | |
| Turnout | | 948 | 99.37 | |
| PS gain from UMP | | Swing | | |

Haute-Saône's 2nd constituency Election 2002 (Runoff)
| Party | Candidate | Votes | % | ±% |
|---|---|---|---|---|
| UMP | Maryvonne Briot | 19 045 | 51.09 | |
| PS | Jean-Pierre Michel | 18 234 | 48.91 | |
| Majority | | 811 | 2.18 | |
| Turnout | | 39 782 | 64.97 | |
| UMP gain from PS | | Swing | | |
