= Barbara Bessot Ballot =

French politician (born 1972)

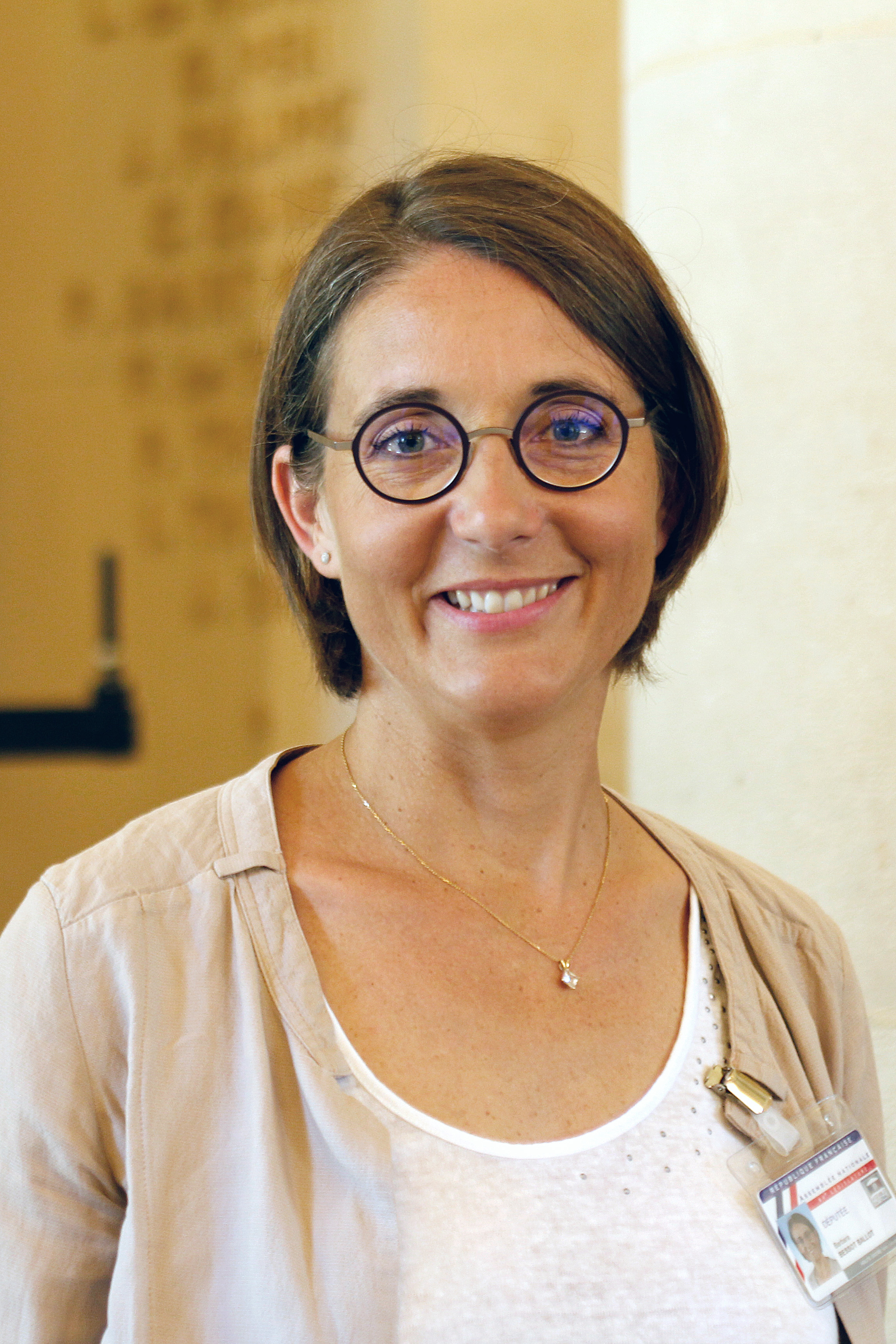

Member of the National Assembly for Haute-Saône's 1st constituency
- In office 21 July 2017 – 21 June 2022
- Preceded by: Alain Chrétien
- Succeeded by: Antoine Villedieu

Personal details
- Born: 13 April 1972 (age 53) Besançon, France
- Party: LREM

Barbara Bessot Ballot (French pronunciation: [baʁbaʁa bɛso balo]; born 13 April 1972) is a French politician who served as a member of the French National Assembly from 2017 until 2022, where she represented the 1st constituency of the Haute-Saône.

== Early life and education ==
Bessot Ballot, daughter of restorers of Marnay, was born in Besançon and spent her childhood in the village of Chassey-lès-Scey. Mother of three children, she is married to Vincent Ballot, mayor of Marnay since 2001.

She was a firefighter volunteer in Marnay between 2001 and 2006. Barbara Bessot Ballot is managing director of BVB-La Grange in Marnay, founded and managed with her husband Vincent Ballot since 1996. This is a company that sells teas and coffees for professionals.

== Member of the National Assembly ==
On 11 June 2017, Bessot Ballot came first, with 28.58% of the vote, in the first round of the legislative election. Opposed to the second round to a candidate of the National Front, she wins with 59.13% of the vote on 18 June 2017.

In the National Assembly, Bessot Ballot serves on the Committee on Economic Affairs. She is also a Vice President of the trade, crafts's Working Group, Vice President of the Food industry facing the challenges of food's Working Group and Vice President of the Road and road safety's Working Group. In March 2019, She is appointed President of the new Gastronomy's Working Group at the National Assembly.

Member of the Agriculture's Working Group, Bessot Ballot published in October 2017 a first report on the threshold of resale at a loss and the framing of promotions within the framework of the General States of Food, launched in July 2017 by the Minister of Agriculture.

Following the Assises du Commerce held in Vesoul and Gray in April 2018, Bessot Ballot published in May 2018 and submitted to the Ministers of Economy and Finance and Cohesion of the Territories her report on issues related to dynamism and the attractiveness of businesses in small towns and town centers.

Since April 2019, Bessot Ballot has been participating in the work of the inquiry commission on the situation and the practices of the large retailers and its groupings in their commercial relations with the suppliers.

She lost her seat in the second round of the 2022 French legislative election. The seat was won by Antoine Villedieu of the National Rally.

== See also ==
- 2017 French legislative election
