= Haute-Saône's 1st constituency =

Constituency of the National Assembly of France

1st constituency of Haute-Saône
- inline Constituency of the National Assembly of France

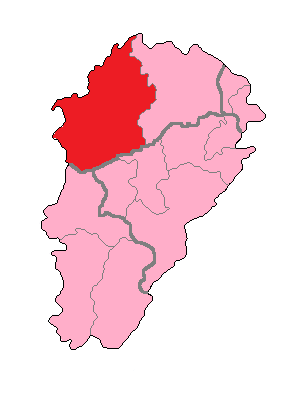
- Haute-Saône's 1st Constituency shown within Franche-Comté
- Deputy: Antoine Villedieu; RN
- Department: Haute-Saône
- Cantons: Amance, Autrey-lès-Gray, Champlitte, Combeaufontaine, Dampierre-sur-Salon, Fresne-Saint-Mamès, Gray, Gy, Jussey, Marnay, Pesmes, Port-sur-Saône, Rioz, Scey-sur-Saône-et-Saint-Albin, Vesoul Est et Ouest, Vitrey-sur-Mance.
- Registered voters: 88,838

The 1st constituency of Haute-Saône is a French legislative constituency in the Haute-Saône département. Like the other 576 French constituencies, it elects one MP using a two round electoral system.

== Description ==
The 1st constituency of Haute-Saône is centred on the small town of Vesoul and covers the western portion of the department. The borders of the constituency crested for the 2012 election match those of the old 1st Constituency which existed between 1958 and 1986 after which Haute-Saône had three constituencies before reverting to two in 2012.

Until 2017 the constituency had elected conservative representatives throughout the Fifth Republic.

== Historic Representation ==
Election	Member	Party
1958	Pierre Vitter	IR
1962	Pierre Vitter	IR
1967	Pierre Vitter	IR
1968	Pierre Vitter	IR
1973	Pierre Vitter	IR
1978	Pierre Chantelat	UDF
1981	Christian Bergelin	RPR
1986	Proportional representation – no election by constituency	
1988	Christian Bergelin	RPR
1993	Christian Bergelin	RPR
1997	Christian Bergelin	RPR
2002	Jean Rosselot	UMP
2007	Jean Rosselot	UMP
2012	Alain Chrétien	UMP
2017	Barbara Bessot Ballot	LREM
2022	Antoine Villedieu	RN
2024	Antoine Villedieu	RN

== Election results ==
=== 2024 ===
Candidate	Party	Alliance	First round			Second round		
Candidate	Party	Alliance	Votes	%	+/–	Votes	%	+/–
Antoine Villedieu	RN		29,459	48.82	+19.13	32,044	53.54	-0.96
Alain Chrétien	HOR	Ensemble	18,093	29.99	+7.56	27,812	46.46	+0.96
Sébastien Poyard	LFI	NFP	10,362	17.17	-1.67			
Mohamed-Salah Zelfa	DIV		906	1.50	new			
Cédric Fischer	LO		816	1.35	-0.52			
Philippe Ghiles	REC		701	1.16	-2.81			
Votes			60,337	100.00		59,856	100.00	
Valid votes			60,337	96.52	-0.57	59,856	94.99	+4.60
Blank votes			1,227	1.96	+0.26	2,043	3.24	-2.95
Null votes			947	1.51	+0.30	2,043	3.24	-0.18
Turnout			62,511	70.75	+17.96	63,011	71.32	+19.62
Abstentions			25,844	29.25	-17.96	25,337	28.68	-19.62
Registered voters			88,355			88,348		
Result			RN HOLD					

=== 2022 ===
Legislative Election 2022: Haute-Saône's 1st constituency
Party	Candidate	Votes	%	±%
RN	Antoine Villedieu	13,441	29.69	+10.42
LREM (Ensemble)	Barbara Bessot Ballot	10,155	22.43	-6.15
LR (UDC)	Dimitri Doussot	8,946	19.76	+7.20
LFI (NUPÉS)	Sandra Girardot	8,531	18.84	+1.35
REC	Philippe Ghiles	1,798	3.97	N/A
Others	N/A	2,404	-	−
Turnout		45,275	52.79	−0.18
2nd round result
RN	Antoine Villedieu	22,498	54.50	+13.63
LREM (Ensemble)	Barbara Bessot Ballot	18,781	45.50	−13.63
Turnout		41,279	51.70	+7.48
RN gain from LREM				

=== 2017 ===
Legislative Election 2017: Haute-Saône's 1st constituency
Party	Candidate	Votes	%	±%
LREM	Barbara Bessot Ballot	13,390	28.58	N/A
FN	Léonie Cugnot	9,029	19.27	+5.66
DVD	Marie Breton	8,135	17.36	N/A
LR	Dimitri Doussot	5,840	12.46	−27.62
LFI	François Froidurot	4,237	9.04	N/A
PS	Laurent Ricard	2,256	4.81	−28.77
EELV	Corinne Guyonnet	1,259	2.69	N/A
Others	N/A	2,713		
Turnout		46,859	52.97	−10.61
2nd round result
LREM	Barbara Bessot Ballot	23,129	59.13	N/A
FN	Léonie Cugnot	15,989	40.87	N/A
Turnout		39,118	44.22	−18.42
LREM gain from LR				

=== 2012 ===
Legislative Election 2012: Haute-Saône's 1st constituency
Party	Candidate	Votes	%	±%
UMP	Alain Chrétien	22,639	40.08	
PS	Claudy Chauvelot-Duban	18,968	33.58	
FN	Colette Clerc	7,686	13.61	
DVG	Frédéric Bernabé	1,481	2.62	
FG	Clotilde Prot	1,455	2.58	
MoDem	Jean-Claude Gay	1,212	2.15	
Others	N/A	3,045		
Turnout		56,486	63.58	
2nd round result
UMP	Alain Chrétien	29,688	53.35	
PS	Claudy Chauvelot-Duban	25,962	46.65	
Turnout		55,650	62.64	
UMP hold				

=== 2007 ===
Legislative Election 2007: Haute-Saône's 1st constituency
Party	Candidate	Votes	%	±%
UMP	Alain Joyandet	23,382	56.72	
PS	Armelle Salvador	9,560	23.19	
FN	Jacques Bard	1,970	4.78	
MoDem	Francis Jerome	1,775	4.31	
PCF	Régine Stiefvater	1,223	2.97	
LV	Philippe Chatelain	1,137	2.76	
Others	N/A	2,180	-	−
Turnout		41,972	65.50	
UMP hold				

=== 2002 ===
Legislative Election 2002: Haute-Saône's 1st constituency
Party	Candidate	Votes	%	±%
UMP	Alain Joyandet	19,199	45.85	
PS	Philippe Chatelain*	9,881	23.60	
FN	Marcel Grognu	5,630	13.45	
DVG	Paul Chaviet	1,789	4.27	
PCF	Frédéric Bernabe	1,667	3.98	
LV	Philippe Chatelain	905	2.16	
Others	N/A	2,798	-	−
Turnout		42,849	69.07	
2nd round result
UMP	Alain Joyandet	23,095	59.93	
PS	Philippe Chatelain*	15,439	40.07	
Turnout		40,447	65.21	
UMP hold				

* PS dissident

=== 1997 ===
Legislative Election 1997: Haute-Saône's 1st constituency
Party	Candidate	Votes	%	±%
RPR	Christian Bergelin	15,848	38.12	
PS	Loïc Niepceron	10,680	25.69	
FN	Marcel Grognu	6,415	15.43	
PCF	Frédéric Bernabé	3,049	7.33	
LDI	Michel Bailly	1,531	3.68	
LO	Jean Leureux	1,262	3.04	
GE	Jean-François Jurvillier	1,146	2.76	
MEI	Michèle Durand-Migeon	972	2.34	
EXG	Nicolas Bultot	674	1.62	
Turnout		44,255	73.64	
2nd round result
RPR	Christian Bergelin	23,031	53.68	
PS	Loïc Niepceron	19,872	46.32	
Turnout		46,026	76.59	
RPR hold				

== Sources ==
Official results of French elections from 2002: "Résultats électoraux officiels en France" (in French).
