= List of mayors of Vesoul =

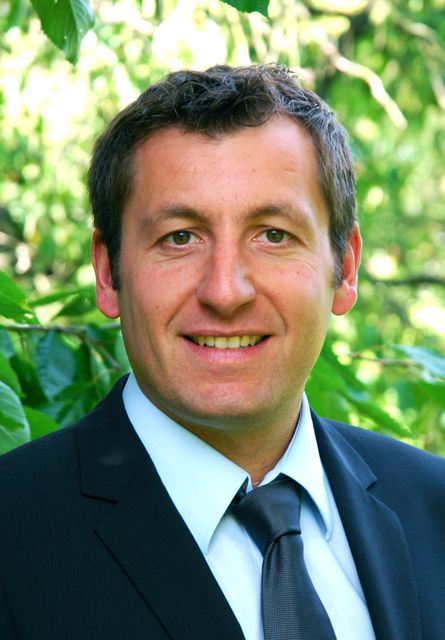
The current mayor Alain Chrétien

This article lists the Mayors of Vesoul in chronological order from 1797 to today

== List of mayors ==
List of mayors.

List of mayors
| Period | Name |
|---|---|
| 1797-1810 | Antoine de Mailly |
| 1813-1826 | Georges-Louis de Fyard |
| 1815-1825 | Jean-Claude Maire |
| 1826-1826 | Charles-François Levert |
| 1826-1829 | Nicolas Baulmont |
| 1829-1830 | Claude Petitclerc |
| 1830-1833 | Charles-Auguste Leroy de Lisa |
| 1833-1833 | Nicolas Courcelle |
| 1833-1835 | Alexandre Ébaudy de Fresnes |
| 1837-1848 | Nicolas Baulmont |
| 1848-1857 | Etienne Bernard Rossen |
| 1857-1866 | Henri François Frin |
| 1866-1870 | Jean-Charles, Augustin Petitclerc |
| 1870-1877 | Alphonse Noirot |
| 1871-1877 | Marie-Félix, Albert Grillet |
| 1877-1892 | Charles Emé Jules Meillier |
| 1892-1897 | Adolphe Despierres |
| 1897-1902 | Louis Joseph Émile Grillon |
| 1902-1904 | Harold Fachard |
| 1904-1908 | Jean Gustave Edmond Chaudey |
| 1908-1933 | Paul Morel |
| 1934-1940 | René Weil |
| 1940-1942 | René Hologne |
| 1942-1944 | Paul Heymes |
| 1944-1945 | René Weil |
| 1945-1946 | René Hologne |
| 1946-1947 | Georges Garret |
| 1947-1953 | Georges Ponsot |
| 1953-1977 | Pierre Renet |
| 1977-1989 | Pierre Chantelat |
| 1989-1995 | Loïc Niepceron |
| 1995-2012 | Alain Joyandet |
| 2012-ongoing | Alain Chrétien |
