= Marnay, Haute-Saône =

Marnay
- Commune
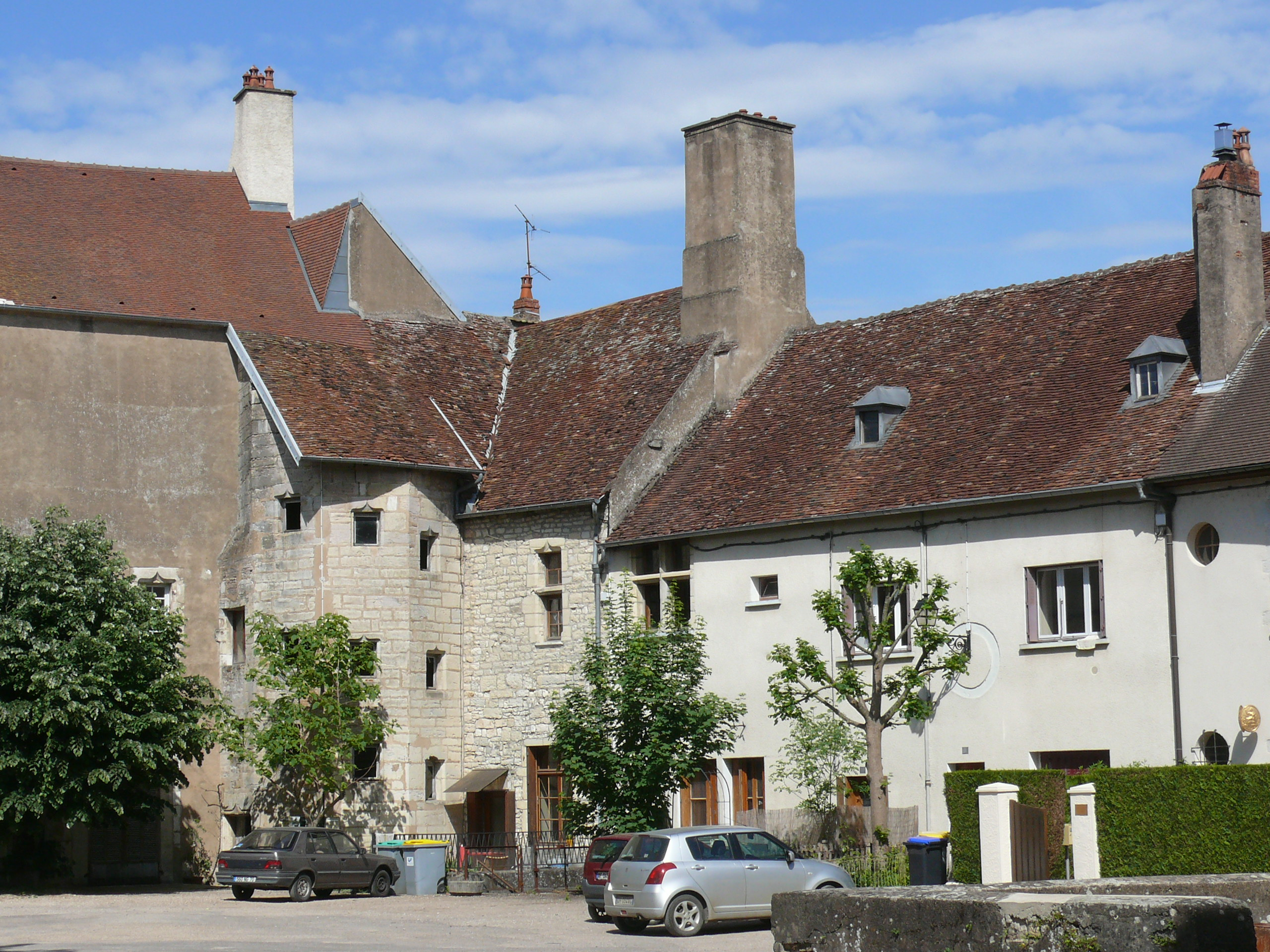
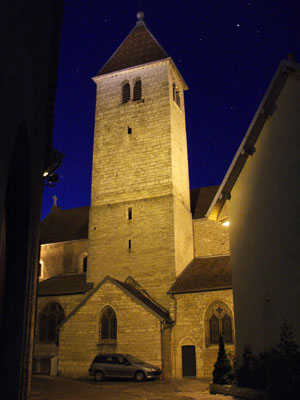
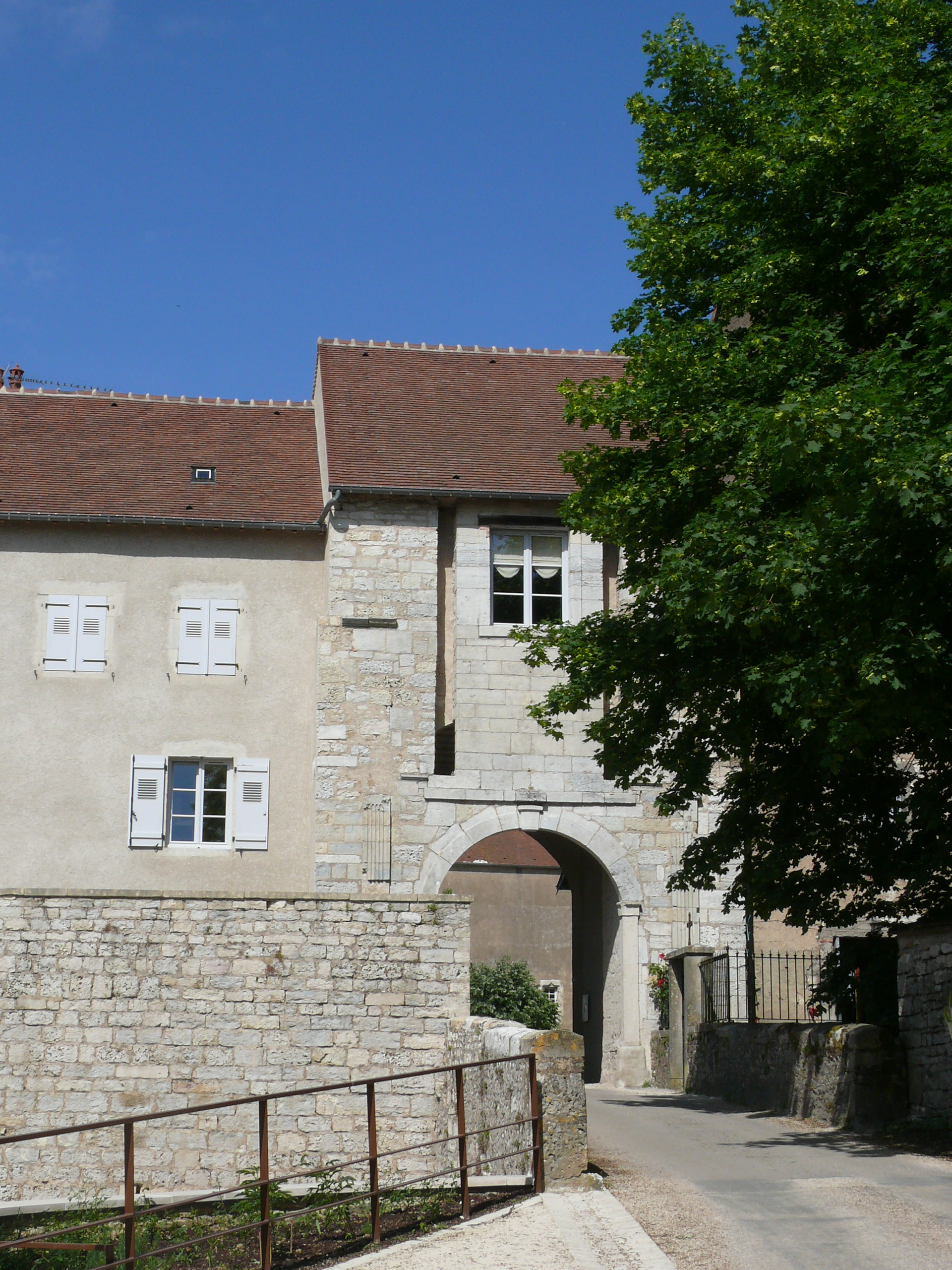
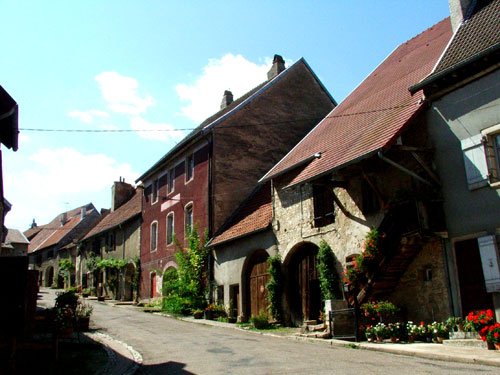
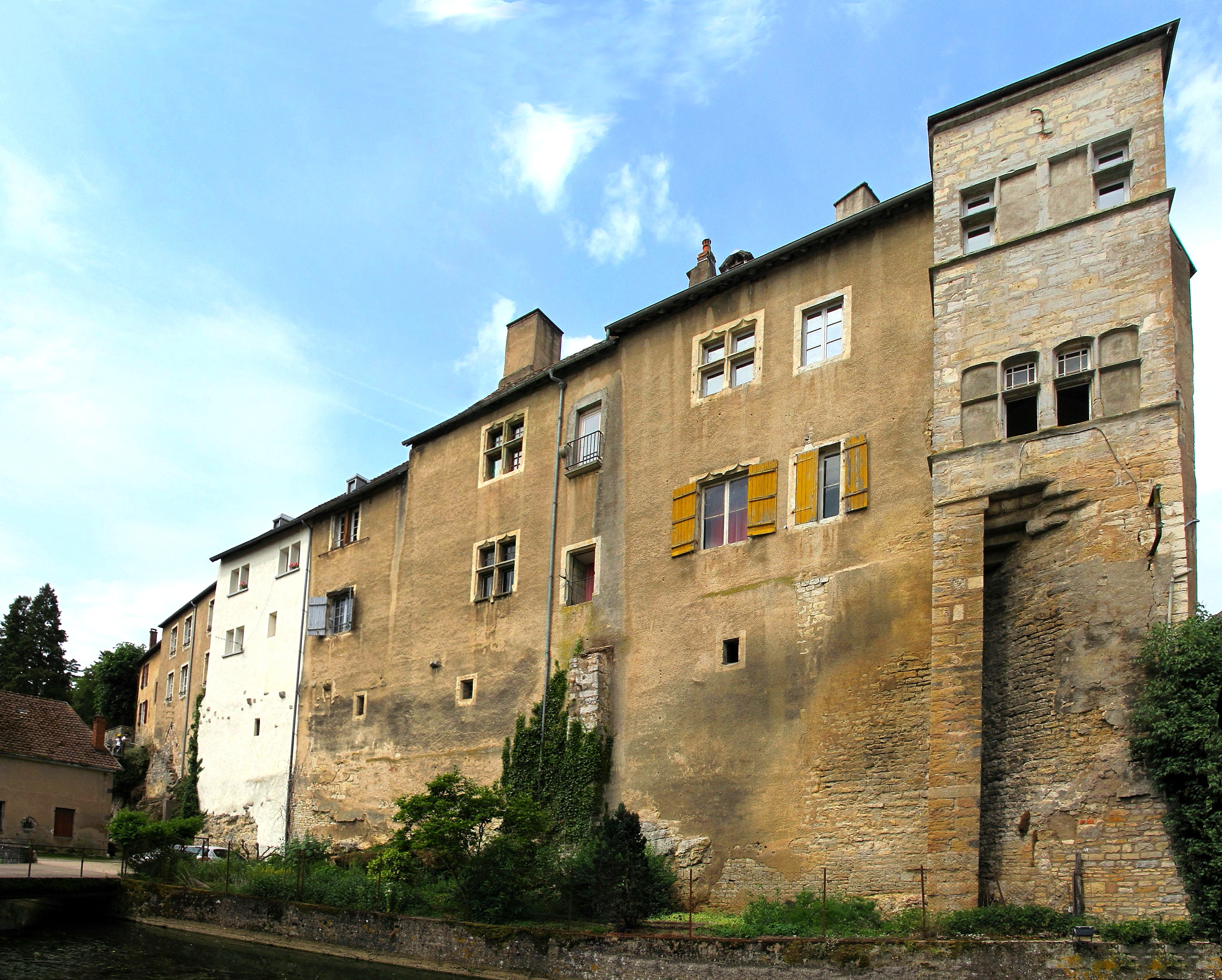
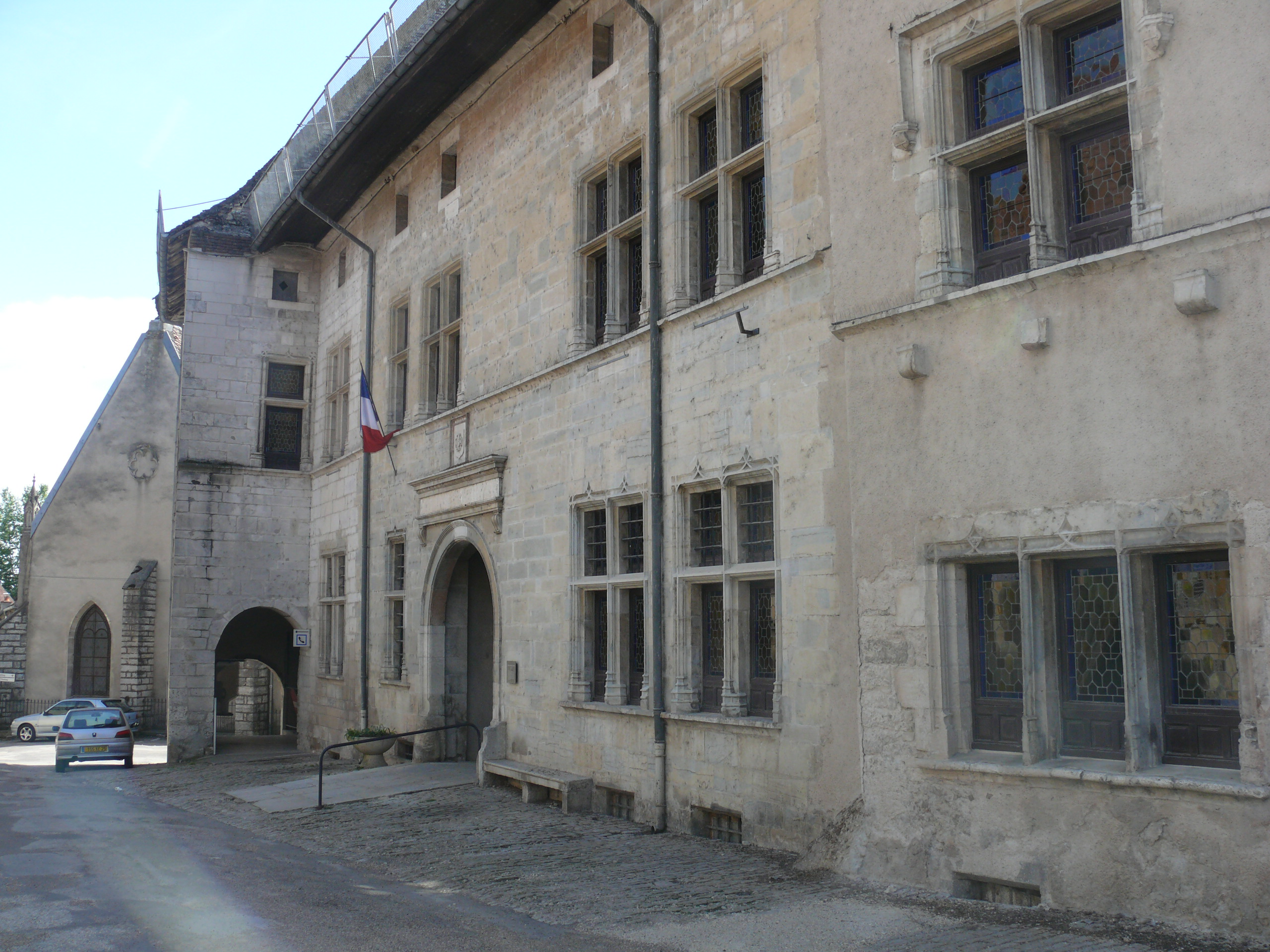

- Coat of arms
- Location of Marnay
- Location within France Location within Bourgogne-Franche-Comté
- Coordinates: 47°17′26″N 5°46′20″E
- Country: France
- Region: Bourgogne-Franche-Comté
- Department: Haute-Saône
- Arrondissement: Vesoul
- Canton: Marnay

Government
  - Mayor (2020–2026): Vincent Ballot
- Area^{1}: 10.37 km^{2} (4.00 sq mi)
- Highest elevation: 324 m (1,063 ft)
- Lowest elevation: 189 m (620 ft)
- Population (2023): 1,528
  - Density: 147.3/km^{2} (381.6/sq mi)
- Time zone: UTC+01:00 (CET)
  - Summer (DST): UTC+02:00 (CEST)
- INSEE/Postal code: 70334 /70150
- ^{1} French Land Register data, which excludes lakes, ponds, glaciers > 1 km^{2} (0.386 sq mi or 247 acres) and river estuaries.

Marnay (French pronunciation: [maʁnɛ]) is a commune in the Haute-Saône department in the region of Bourgogne-Franche-Comté in eastern France.

== See also ==
- Communes of the Haute-Saône department
