= Haute-Saône's 2nd constituency =

Constituency of the National Assembly of France

2nd constituency of Haute-Saône
- inline Constituency of the National Assembly of France

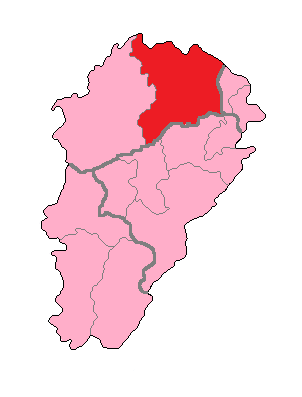
- Haute-Saône's 2nd Constituency shown within Franche-Comté
- Deputy: Emeric Salmon; RN
- Department: Haute-Saône
- Cantons: Champagney, Faucogney-et-la-Mer, Héricourt Est, Héricourt Ouest, Lure Nord, Lure Sud, Luxeuil-les-Bains, Mélisey, Montbozon, Noroy-le-Bourg, Saint-Loup-sur-Semouse, Saint-Sauveur, Saulx, Vauvillers, Villersexel.
- Registered voters: 91,944

The 2nd constituency of Haute-Saône is a French legislative constituency in the Haute-Saône département. Like the other 576 French constituencies, it elects one MP using a two round electoral system.

== Description ==
The 2nd constituency of Haute-Saône is centered on the small towns of Héricourt and Lure it covers the eastern portion of the department. The borders of the constituency created for the 2012 election match those of the old 1st Constituency which existed between 1958 and 1986 after which Haute-Saône had three constituencies before reverting to two in 2012.

From 1981 until 2002 the seat was held Jean-Pierre Michel first elected as a Socialist before he joined Jean-Pierre Chevènement's breakaway Citizen's Movement in 1993. The conservative UMP took the seat at the 2002 election before quickly losing it to the Socialists in 2007.

The Socialist Jean-Michel Villaumé was narrowly re-elected with a majority of just 246 at the 2012 election suggesting the seat can be classified as marginal.

In 2017, Christophe Lejeune won the seat for President Emmanuel Macron's centrist LREM party, but lost re-election to Emeric Salmon of the far-right RN party.

== Historic Representation ==
Election	Member	Party
1958	Alfred Clerget	UNR
1967	Jacques Maroselli	DVG
1968	Jean-Jacques Beucler	DVD
1973	Jean-Jacques Beucler	DVD
1978	Jean-Jacques Beucler	UDF
1981	Jean-Pierre Michel	PS
1986	Proportional representation – no election by constituency	
1988	Jean-Pierre Michel	PS
1993	Jean-Pierre Michel	MDC
1997	Jean-Pierre Michel	MDC
2002	Maryvonne Briot	UMP
2007	Jean-Michel Villaumé	PS
2012	Jean-Michel Villaumé	PS
2017	Christophe Lejeune	LREM
2022	Emeric Salmon	RN
2024	Emeric Salmon	RN

== Election results ==
=== 2024 ===
Candidate	Party	Alliance	First round			Second round		
Candidate	Party	Alliance	Votes	%	+/–	Votes	%	+/–
Emeric Salmon	RN		30,315	50.11	+17.13			
Eric Houlley	PS	NFP	13,632	22.53	+1.74			
Fabrice Barassi Kamochnikoff	RE	Ensemble	8,354	13.81	-11.88			
Loïc Laborie	LR	UDC	6,600	10.91	new			
Isabelle Apro	LO		1,018	1.68	-0.37			
Christophe Devillers	REC		579	0.96	-3.69			
Votes			60,498	100.00				
Valid votes			60,498	96.36	-0.48			
Blank votes			1,201	1.91	-0.05			
Null votes			1,082	1.72	+0.52			
Turnout			62,781	70.24	+19.44			
Abstentions			26,597	29.76	-19.44			
Registered voters			89,378					
Result			RN HOLD					

=== 2022 ===
Legislative Election 2022: Haute-Saône's 2nd constituency
Party	Candidate	Votes	%	±%
RN	Emeric Salmon	14,574	32.98	+13.00
LREM (Ensemble)	Christophe Lejeune	11,353	25.69	-6.65
LFI (NUPÉS)	Patrice Guerain	9,188	20.79	+3.66
UDI (UDC)	Corinne Coudereau	4,338	9.82	−5.54
REC	Maurice Monnier	2,053	4.64	N/A
LMR	Ludovic Buri	1,110	2.51	N/A
LO	Isabelle Apro	904	2.05	+1.48
PA	Sophie Rochon	666	1.51	N/A
Turnout		44,186	50.80	+0.20
2nd round result
RN	Emeric Salmon	22,244	54.38	+12.38
LREM (Ensemble)	Christophe Lejeune	18,662	45.62	−12.38
Turnout		40,906	50.32	+7.86
RN gain from LREM				

=== 2017 ===
Legislative Election 2017: Haute-Saône's 2nd constituency
Party	Candidate	Votes	%	±%
LREM	Christophe Lejeune	14,848	32.34	N/A
FN	Maurice Monnier	9,174	19.98	+2.21
LR	Isabelle Gehin	7,051	15.36	−18.21
LFI	Isabelle Haismann-Febvay	5,454	11.88	N/A
DIV	Claude Marconot	3,367	7.33	N/A
EELV	Marie-Claire Thomas	1,477	3.22	+0.77
Far right	Christophe Devillers	1,121	2.44	N/A
PCF	Quentin Hafekost	934	2.03	−2.46
Others	N/A	2,489		
Turnout		45,915	50.60	−11.53
2nd round result
LREM	Christophe Lejeune	22,343	58.00	N/A
FN	Maurice Monnier	16,181	42.00	N/A
Turnout		38,524	42.46	−18.58
LREM gain from PS				

=== 2012 ===
Legislative Election 2012: Haute-Saône's 2nd constituency
Party	Candidate	Votes	%	±%
PS	Jean-Michel Villaumé	20,227	35.40	
UMP	Michel Raison	19,181	33.57	
FN	Jean Receveur	10,150	17.77	
FG	Gilles Lazar	2,563	4.49	
EELV	Marie-Claire Thomas	1,399	2.45	
Others	N/A	3,613		
Turnout		57,133	62.13	
2nd round result
PS	Jean-Michel Villaumé	28,185	50.22	
UMP	Michel Raison	27,939	49.78	
Turnout		56,124	61.04	
PS hold				

=== 2007 ===
Legislative Election 2007: Haute-Saône's 2nd constituency
Party	Candidate	Votes	%	±%
UMP	Maryvonne Briot	14,598	37.70	
PS	Jean-Michel Villaume	12,442	32.13	
FN	Claude Thiebaut	3,510	9.07	
MoDem	Stephen Thueillon	1,742	4.50	
EXG	Gilles Lazar	1,333	3.44	
LV	Danielle Bourgon	1,255	3.24	
MPF	Bernard Contois	844	2.18	
PCF	Olivier Del Rizzo	799	2.06	
Others	N/A	2,197	-	−
Turnout		39,945	62.30	
2nd round result
PS	Jean-Michel Villaume	20,795	51.61	
UMP	Maryvonne Briot	19,498	48.39	
Turnout		42,056	65.60	
PS gain from UMP				

=== 2002 ===
Legislative Election 2002: Haute-Saône's 2nd constituency
Party	Candidate	Votes	%	±%
DVG	Jean-Pierre Michel	12,999	33.26	
UMP	Maryvonne Briot	12,124	31.03	
FN	Claude Thiebaut	7,650	19.58	
PCF	Gilles Lazar	2,041	5.22	
LO	Noël Hennequin	848	2.17	
Others	N/A	3,416		
Turnout		40,488	66.11	
2nd round result
UMP	Maryvonne Briot	19,044	51.09	
DVG	Jean-Pierre Michel	18,234	48.91	
Turnout		39,781	64.96	
UMP gain from MDC				

=== 1997 ===
Legislative Election 1997: Haute-Saône's 2nd constituency
Party	Candidate	Votes	%	±%
MDC	Jean-Pierre Michel	13,702	35.37	
PRV	Gilles Roy	8,750	22.59	
FN	Jean-Marc Brissaud	7,662	19.78	
PCF	Gilles Lazar	3,809	9.83	
MEI	Denis Robert	1,854	4.79	
LO	Noël Hennequin	1,598	4.12	
LDI	Claude Brocard	1,366	3.53	
Turnout		41,606	72.54	
2nd round result
MDC	Jean-Pierre Michel	21,843	51.99	
PRV	Gilles Roy	13,577	32.32	
FN	Jean-Marc Brissaud	6,591	15.69	
Turnout		44,263	77.18	
MDC hold				

== Sources ==
Official results of French elections from 2002: "Résultats électoraux officiels en France" (in French).
