= Jean-Michel Villaumé =

French politician

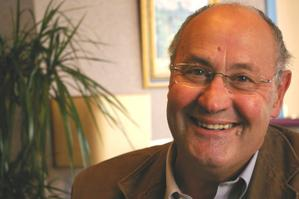
- Jean-Michel Villaumé in 2007

Deputy for Haute-Saône's 2nd constituency in the National Assembly of France
- In office 20 June 2007 – 20 June 2017
- Preceded by: Maryvonne Briot
- Succeeded by: Christophe Lejeune

Personal details
- Born: 24 March 1946 (age 79); Bavilliers, Territoire de Belfort
- Political party: Socialist

Jean-Michel Villaumé (born 24 March 1946 in Bavilliers, Territoire de Belfort) was a member of the National Assembly of France, representing Haute-Saône's 2nd constituency from 2007 to 2017, as a member of the Socialiste, radical, citoyen et divers gauche group.
