= Christian Bergelin =

French politician

Christian Bergelin (15 April 1945 – 26 March 2008) was a French politician. He was Secretary of State for Sport and Youth in the Government of Jacques Chirac (1986–1988).

He was deputy of Haute-Saône at the National Assembly of France and had been president of this department for more than 10 years.

== Biography ==
After Baccalauréat from high school, he studied law and obtained his Licence de droit. He then entered the École nationale des Impôts (National Tax School) and began a career as a chartered accountant. However, following the death of his father in a road accident, he interrupted his studies to take over the family transport business in 1972. He became a municipal councilor in Gray, Haute-Saône in 1977 and served as mayor from 1995 to 1998. He was elected Rally for the Republic deputy for the first constituency of Haute-Saône from 1981 to 2002. In 1986, he was appointed Secretary of State for Youth and Sports in Jacques Chirac's government, a position he held until 1988.

In 1989, he became president of the Haute-Saône General Council. In the 1998 cantonal elections, the right and left ended up tied in Haute-Saône (16 cantons each). Radical Party of the Left candidate Marc Roussel was elected to succeed him, due to his age.

From September 2002 to December 2002, he was elected senator for Haute-Saône, before the election was invalidated by the Constitutional Council (France). He was defeated in the subsequent by-election by Yves Krattinger and withdrew from political life.

He died on the evening of March 26, 2008, from a cerebral Embolism at the age of 62. He was the father of four children and grandfather of sixteen grandchildren.
