= Arrondissements of the Haute-Saône department =

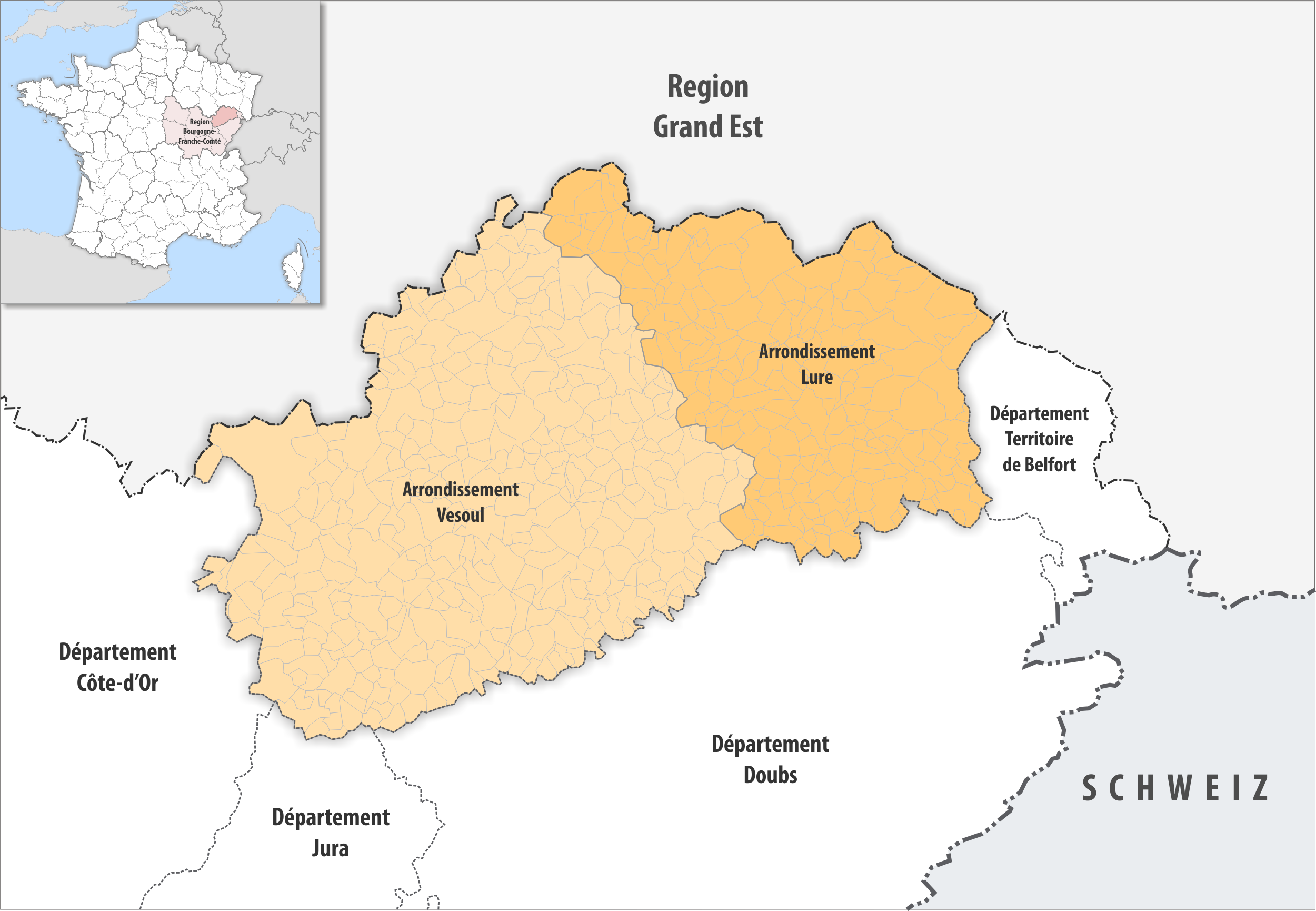
Map of arrondissements of the Haute-Saône department.

The 2 arrondissements of the Haute-Saône department are:

1. Arrondissement of Lure, (subprefecture: Lure) with 192 communes. The population of the arrondissement was 106,659 in 2021.
2. Arrondissement of Vesoul, (prefecture of the Haute-Saône department: Vesoul) with 347 communes. The population of the arrondissement was 127,637 in 2021.

== History ==
In 1800 the arrondissements of Vesoul, Gray and Lure were established. The arrondissement of Gray was disbanded in 1926.

The borders of the arrondissements of Haute-Saône were modified in January 2017:

- three communes from the arrondissement of Lure to the arrondissement of Vesoul
- five commune from the arrondissement of Vesoul to the arrondissement of Lure
