= Christophe Lejeune =

French politician

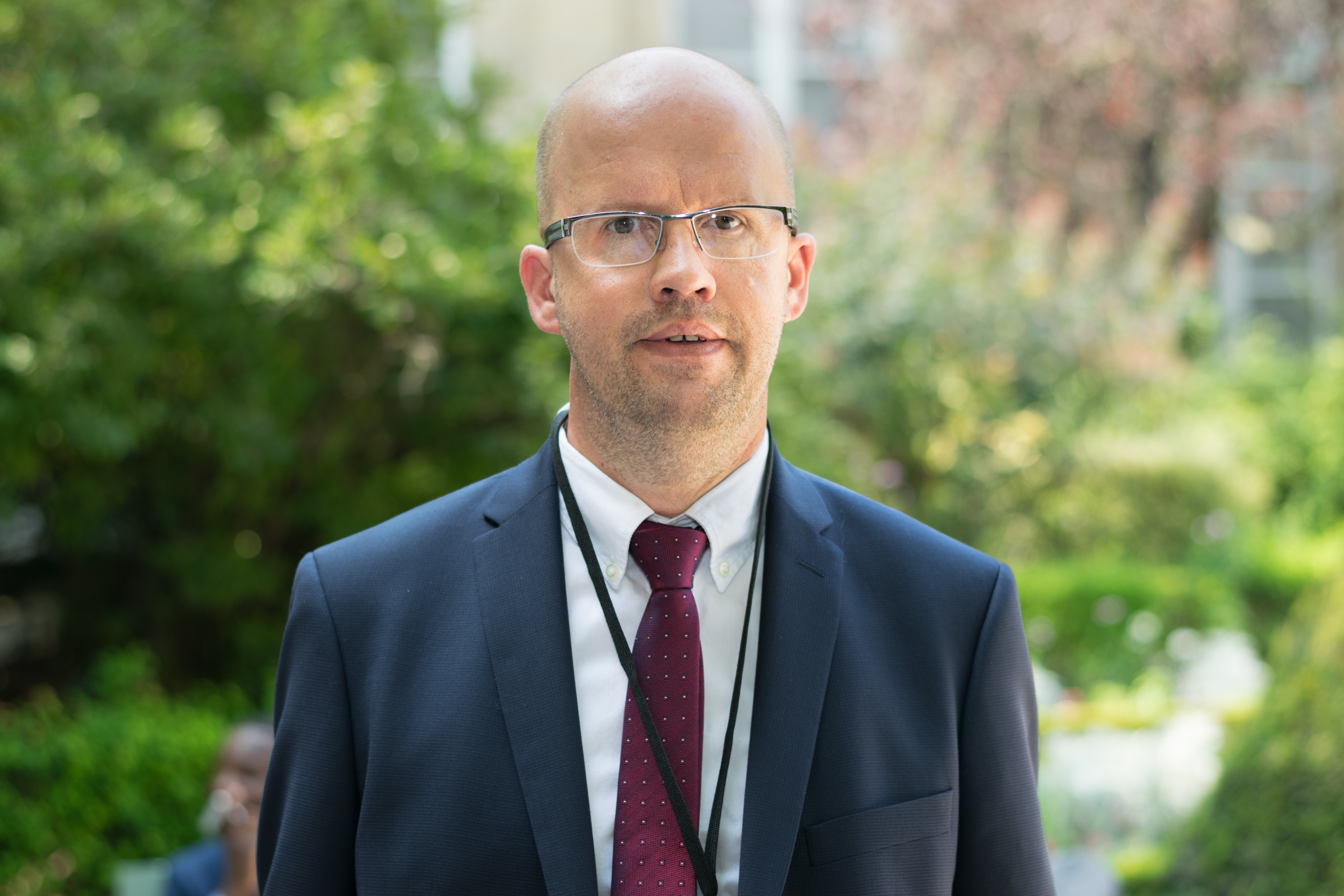

Member of the French National Assembly for Haute-Saône's 2nd constituency
- Incumbent
- Assumed office 21 June 2017
- Preceded by: Jean-Michel Villaumé

Personal details
- Born: 22 March 1968 (age 57); Luxeuil-les-Bains, France
- Political party: La République En Marche!

Christophe Lejeune (French pronunciation: [kʁistɔf ləʒœn]; born 22 March 1968) is a French politician of La République En Marche! (LREM) who was elected to the French National Assembly on 18 June 2017, representing the department of Haute-Saône.

== Political career ==
In parliament, Lejeune serves on the Defense Committee. In addition to his committee assignments, he is a member of the French-Belarusian Parliamentary Friendship Group.

In November 2019, 20 members of the yellow vests movement tried to force open the door of Lejeune's house in the Haute-Saône.

== Political positions ==
In July 2019, Lejeune decided not to align with his parliamentary group's majority and became one of 52 LREM members who abstained from a vote on the French ratification of the European Union's Comprehensive Economic and Trade Agreement (CETA) with Canada.

In late 2019, Lejeune was one of 17 members of the Defense Committee who co-signed a letter to Prime Minister Édouard Philippe in which they warned that the 365 million euro ($406 million) sale of aerospace firm Groupe Latécoère to U.S. fund Searchlight Capital raised "questions about the preservation of know-how and France's defense industry base" and urged government intervention.

== See also ==
- 2017 French legislative election
