= Alain Chrétien =

French politician (born 1975)

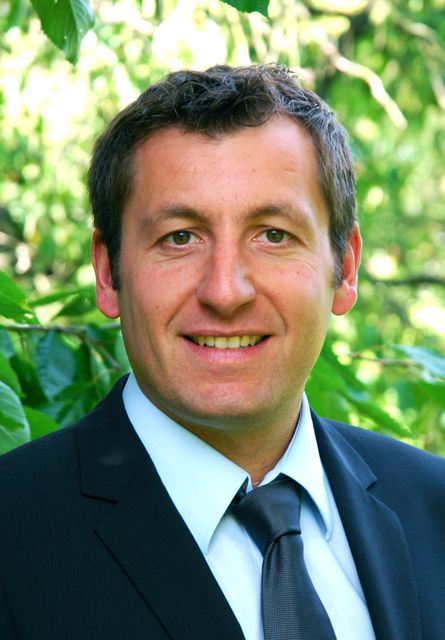
- Alain Chrétien in 2010

Mayor of Vesoul
- Incumbent
- Assumed office 17 March 2012
- Preceded by: Patrick Rimbert

Member of the National Assembly for Haute-Saône's 1st constituency
- In office 19 June 2012 – 19 June 2017
- Preceded by: Alain Joyandet
- Succeeded by: Barbara Bessot-Ballot

Personal details
- Born: 17 March 1975 (age 51) Vesoul, France
- Party: The Republicans; Agir; Horizons (since 2021)
- Education: University of Franche-Comté; Sciences Po Lyon

Alain Chrétien (French pronunciation: [alɛ̃ kʁetjɛ̃]; born 17 March 1975) is a French politician. He is best known for being the mayor of Vesoul.

== Early life and education ==
Alain Chrétien was born in Vesoul, Haute-Saône, but he grew up in Jussey, a town located 35 kilometers northwest of Vesoul. He attended public schools in this area where he earned his Baccalauréat in Economics and Social sciences (Bac B). In 1995, Chrétien entered the University of Franche-Comté where he obtained a master's degree in Economic and Social Administration with honors. In 1996, he graduated from a specialized management program at Sciences Po Lyon.

Chrétien served in the French Army as part of the 152nd Infantry Regiment.

== Political career ==
He began his political career as a parliamentary assistant to Alain Joyandet. His first elected position was as a municipal councillor of Vesoul. He was later elected general councillor of the Canton of Vesoul-1, a position he held until 2012.

He has been the mayor of Vesoul since 17 March 2012.

=== Positions held ===
- 1998 - 1999: Project manager of the land use plan for Vesoul neighborhoods.
- 15 June 2004 - 15 May 2013: President of Pays de Vesoul and the Saône Valley.
- 22 September 2002 - 1 July 2012: General Councillor of the Canton of Vesoul-1.
- 2008 - 2012: Deputy mayor of Vesoul.
- Since 2001: Member of the council of Vesoul.
- Since 14 June 2004: President of the Communauté d'agglomération de Vesoul.
- Since 17 March 2012: Mayor of Vesoul.
- 17 June 2012 - 2017: National Assembly member for Haute-Saône's 1st constituency.

== Political positions ==
In 2019, Chrétien publicly declared his support for incumbent President Emmanuel Macron.
