= Emeric Salmon =

French politician

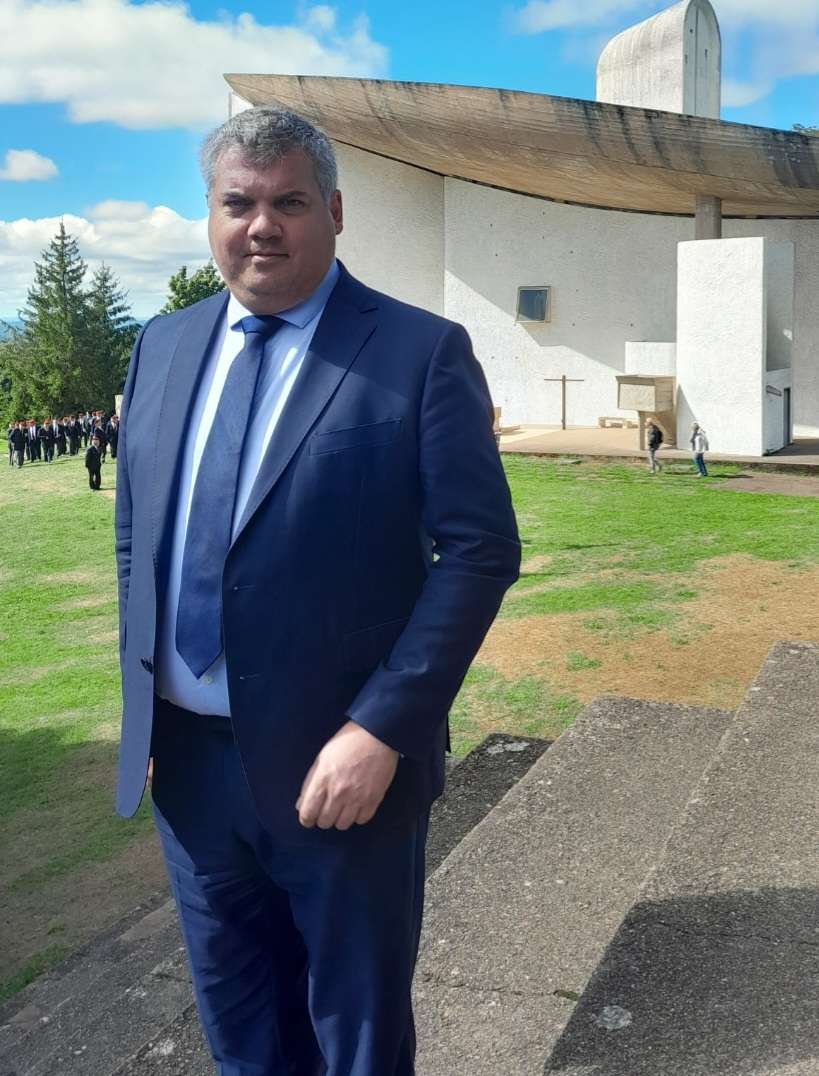

Member of the National Assembly for Haute-Saône's 2nd constituency
- Incumbent
- Assumed office 22 June 2022
- Preceded by: Christophe Lejeune

Personal details
- Born: 26 November 1973 (age 52) Vannes, France
- Party: National Rally
- Education: University of Rennes I
- Occupation: Software developer, politician

Emeric Salmon (born 26 November 1973) is a French politician of the National Rally and a member of the National Assembly for Haute-Saône's 2nd constituency since 2022.

== Biography ==
Salmon was born in Vannes in 1973 to a family of six children. His father was an architect. Salmon studied computer science at the University of Rennes I and worked as a software developer.

He became active in politics as a teenager when he voted No in the 1992 French Maastricht Treaty referendum. He joined the National Front (now National Rally) in 2004 and served as a regional councilor in Brittany from 2015 to 2021.

During the 2017 French legislative election he contested Ille-et-Vilaine's 1st constituency but was eliminated in the first round. During the 2022 French legislative election he was selected to run in Haute-Saône's 2nd constituency for the National Rally and defeated Christophe Lejeune.

== See also ==
- List of deputies of the 16th National Assembly of France
