= Antoine Villedieu (21st-century politician) =

French politician

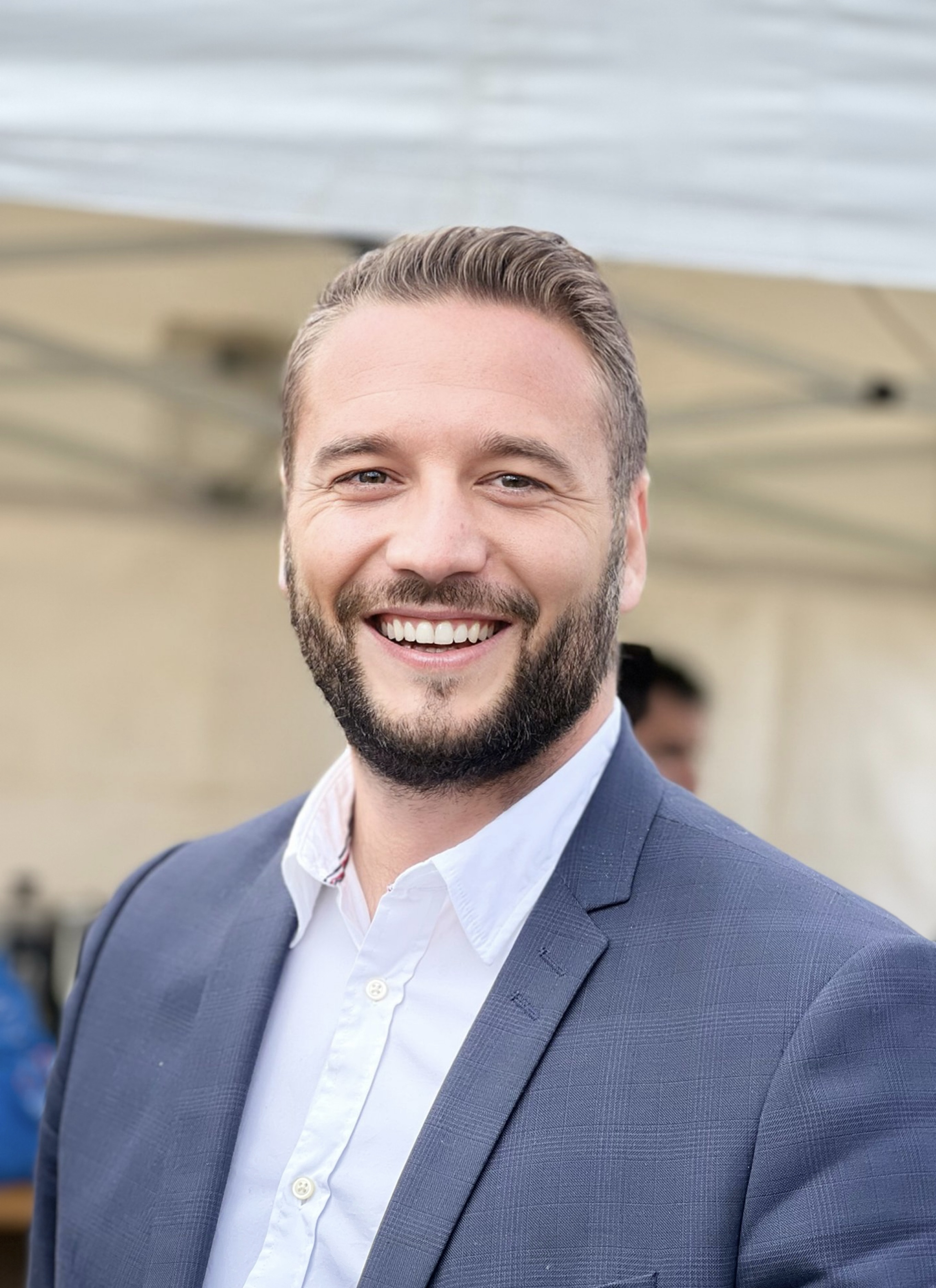
- Antoine Villedieu in 2023

Member of the National Assembly for Haute-Saône's 1st constituency
- Incumbent
- Assumed office 21 June 2022
- Preceded by: Barbara Bessot Ballot

Personal details
- Born: 8 March 1989 (age 37) Lure, Haute-Saône, France
- Party: National Rally

Antoine Villedieu (French pronunciation: [ɑ̃twan vildjø]; born 8 March 1989) is a French politician from National Rally. He has been Member of Parliament for Haute-Saône's 1st constituency since 2022.
