= Maryvonne Briot =

French politician (born 1959)

Maryvonne Briot (born 4 February 1959) is a French former politician from the UMP who served as Member of Parliament for Haute-Saône's 2nd constituency from 2002 to 2007.

== See also ==
- List of deputies of the 12th National Assembly of France
