= Haute-Saône =

Department of France in Bourgogne-Franche-Comté

- Department of France
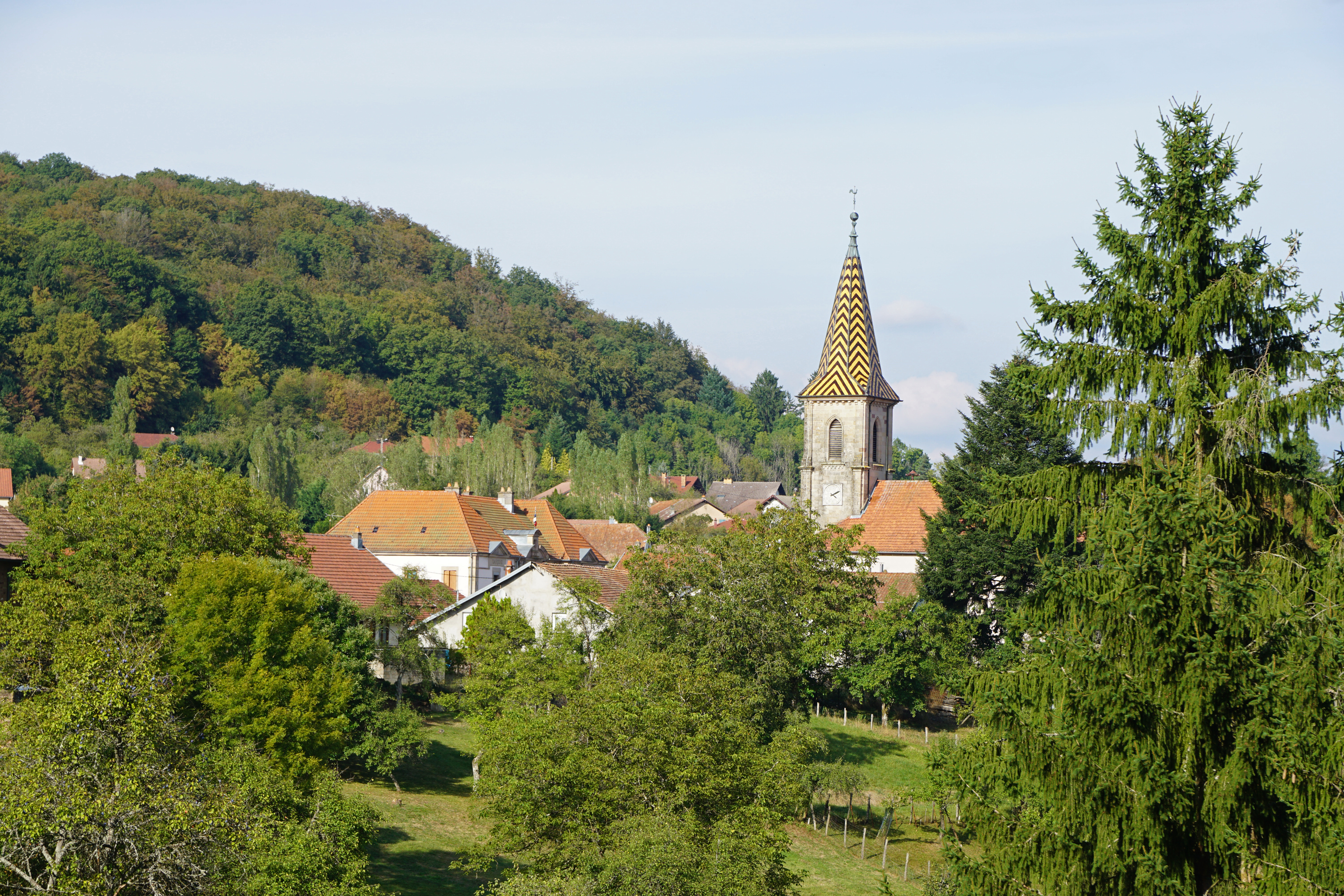
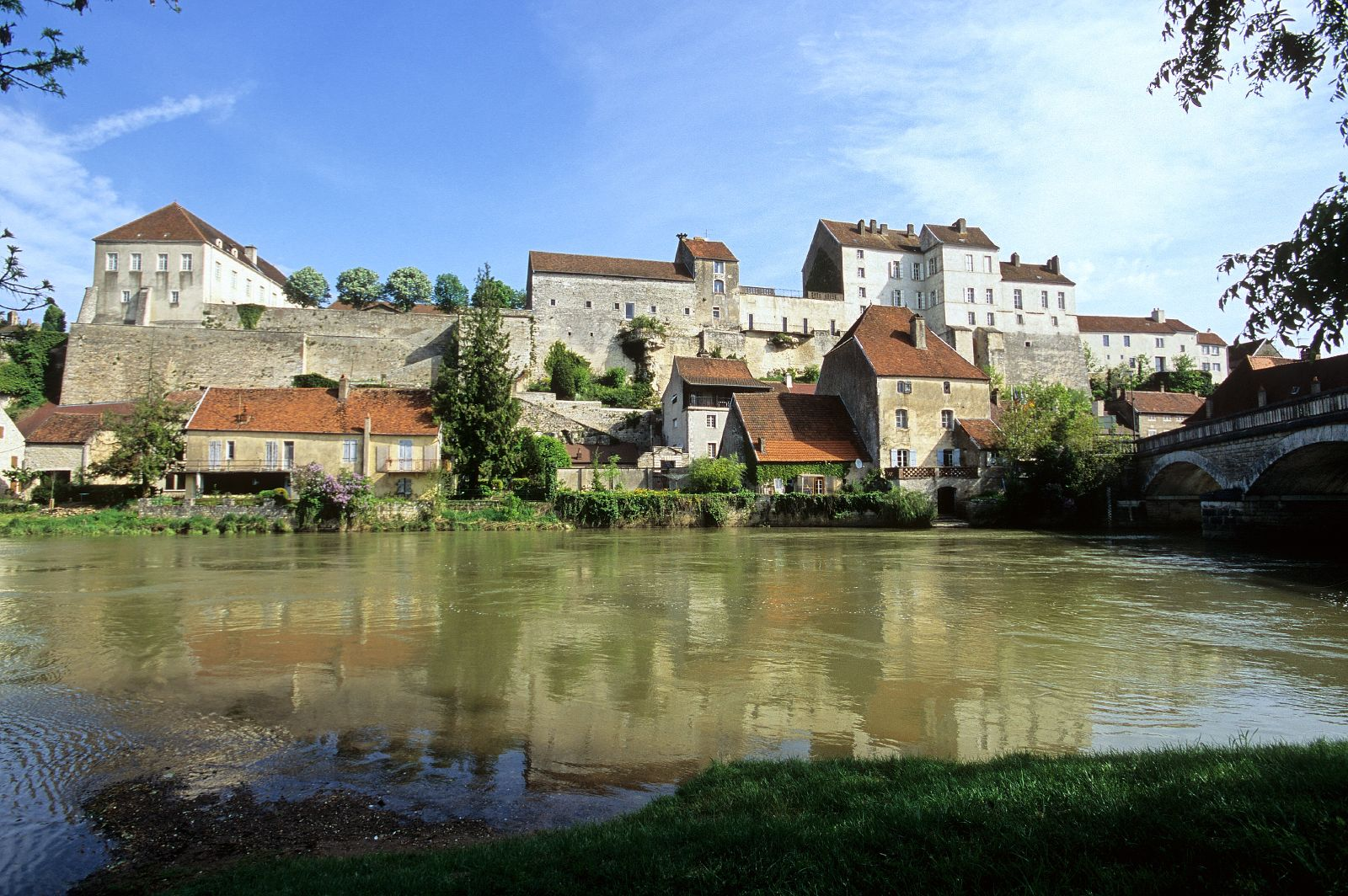
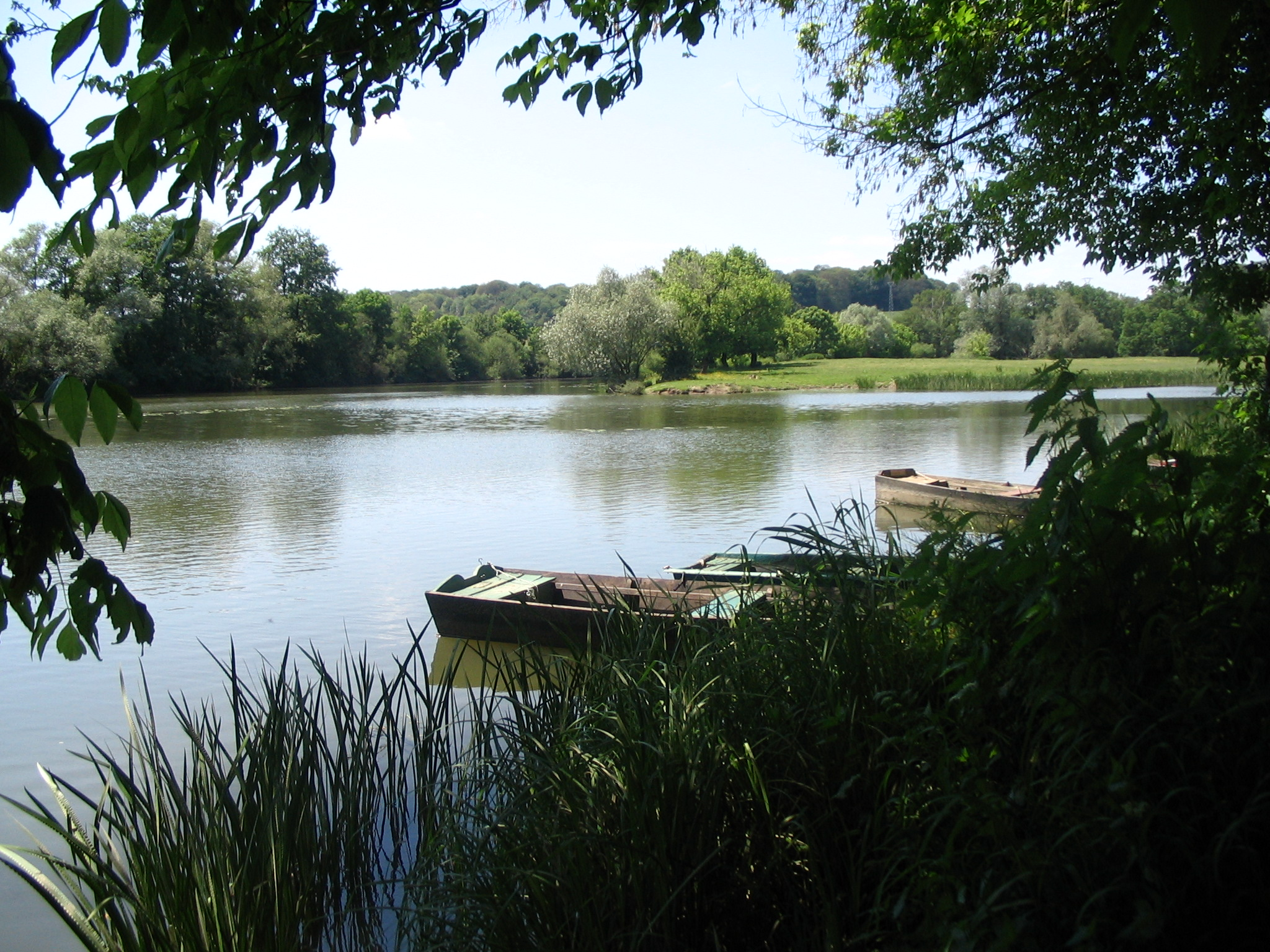
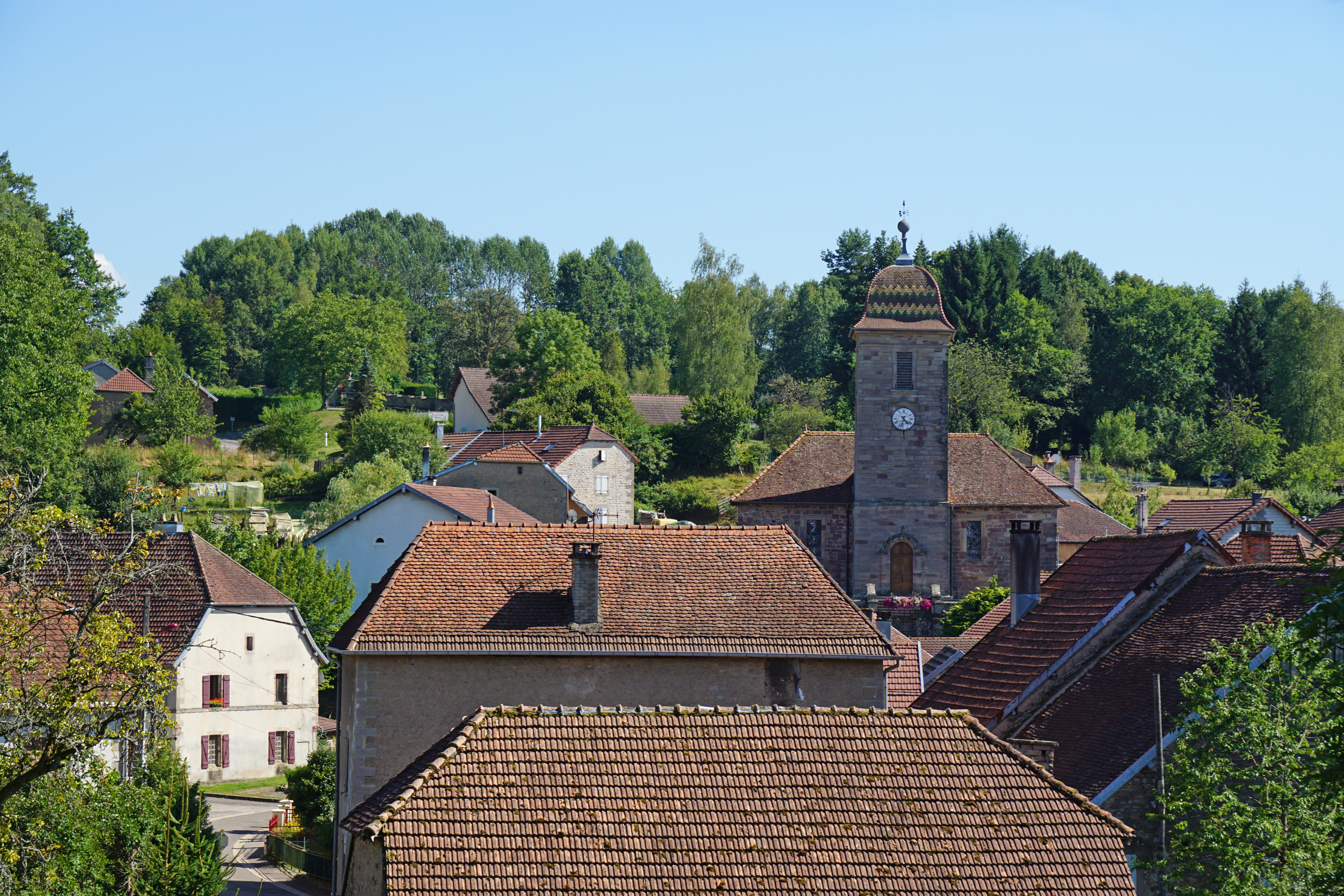
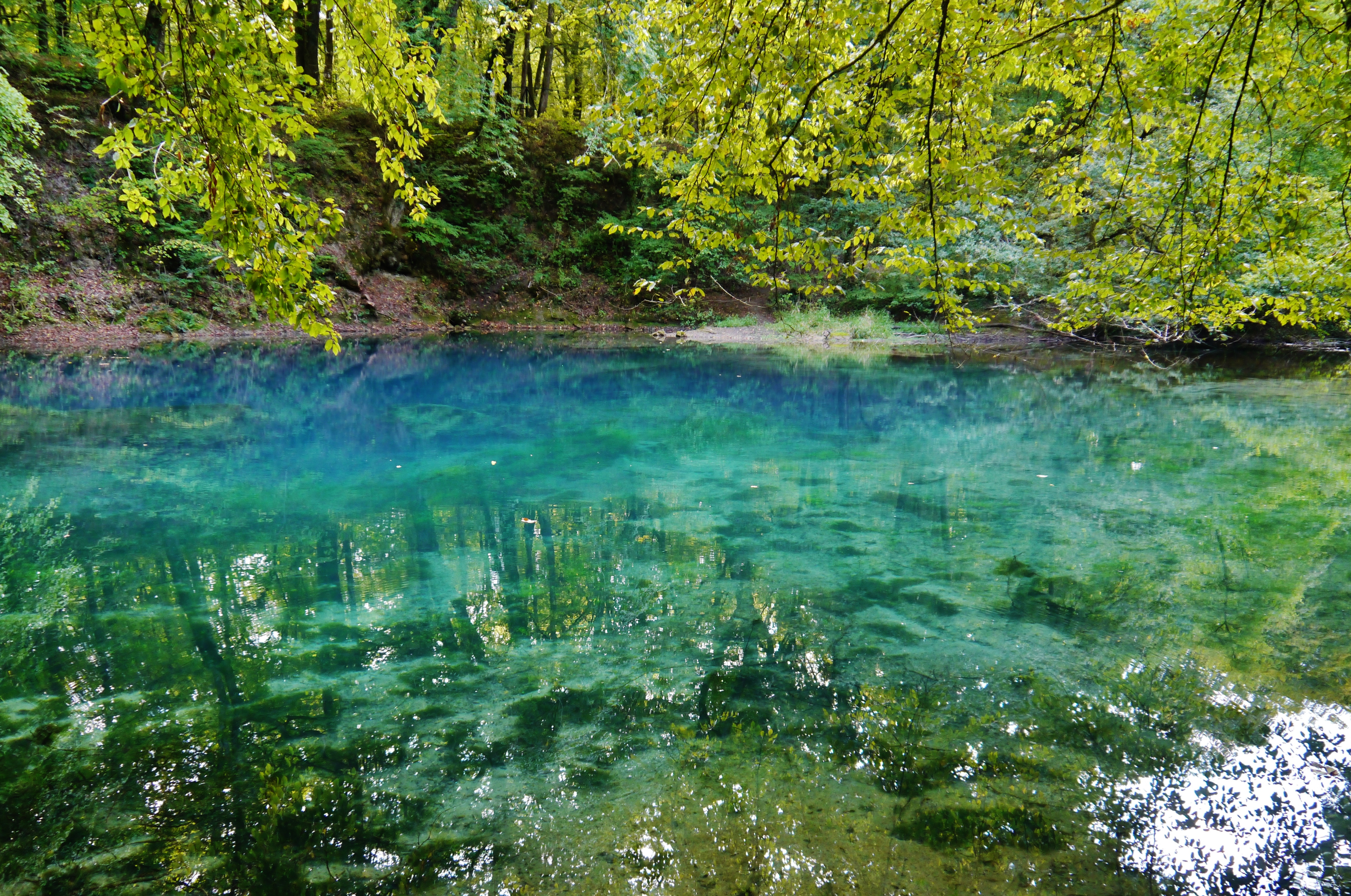
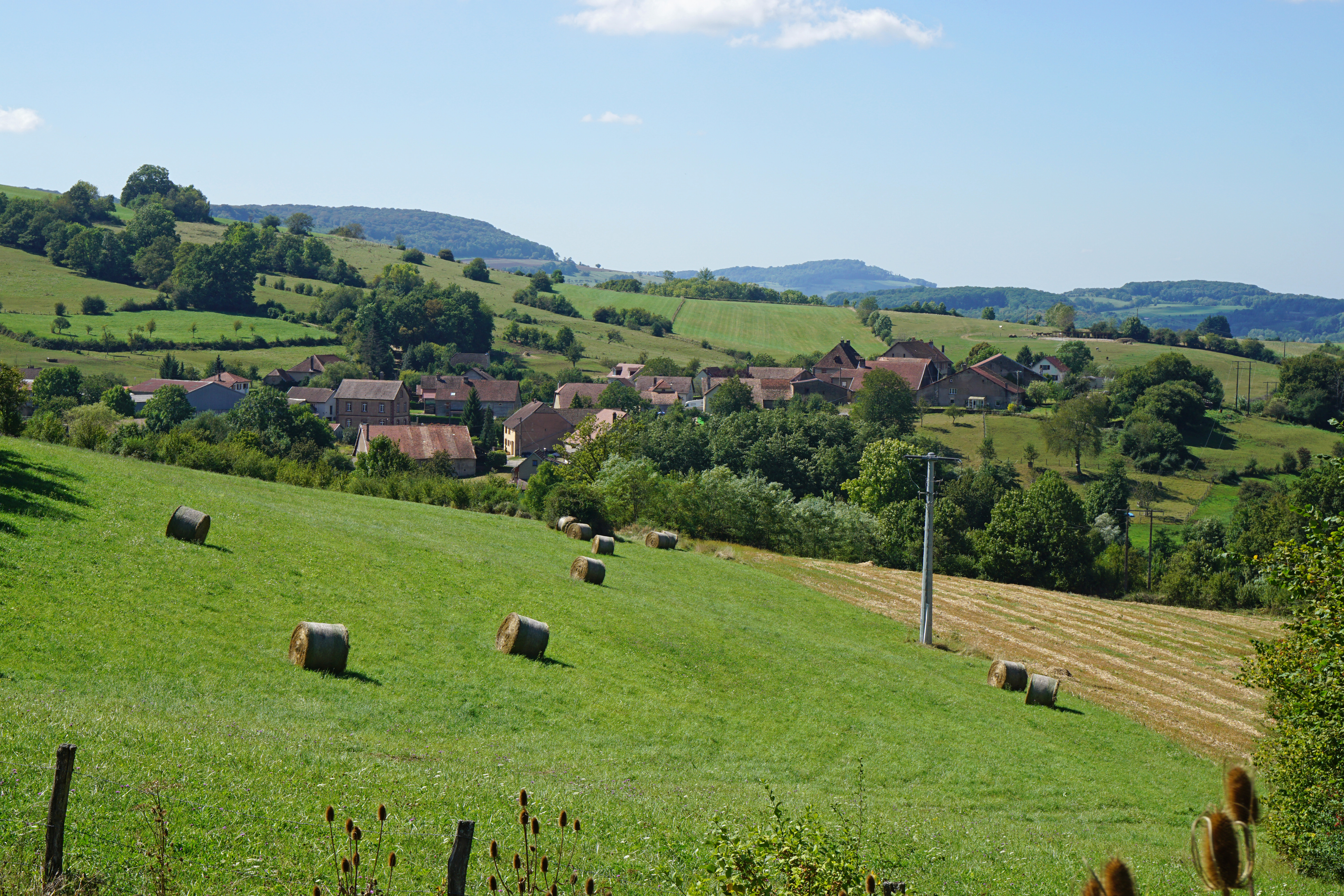
- From top down, left to right: Étobon; the Ognon River in Pesmes; the Saône River in Bucey-lès-Traves; Clairegoutte; Source du Planey in Anjeux; and view of the village of Corcelles in Saulnot

- Flag Coat of arms

- Location of Haute-Saône in France
- Coordinates: 47°35′N 06°00′E
- Country: France
- Region: Bourgogne-Franche-Comté
- Prefecture: Vesoul
- Subprefecture: Lure

Government
  - President of the Departmental Council: Yves Krattinger (DVG)

Area^{1}
  - Total: 5,360 km^{2} (2,070 sq mi)

Population (2023)
  - Total: 233,185
  - Rank: 85th
  - Density: 43.5/km^{2} (113/sq mi)
- Time zone: UTC+1 (CET)
  - Summer (DST): UTC+2 (CEST)
- Department number: 70
- Arrondissements: 2
- Cantons: 17
- Communes: 536
- ^1 French Land Register data, which exclude estuaries and lakes, ponds and glaciers larger than 1 km^{2}

Haute-Saône (French: [ot son]; Frainc-Comtou: Hâte-Saône; English: Upper Saône) is a department in the Bourgogne-Franche-Comté region of northeastern France. Named after the river Saône, it had a population of 233,185 in 2023. Its prefecture is Vesoul; its sole subprefecture is Lure.

== History ==
The department was created in the early years of the French Revolution through the application of a law dated 22 December 1789, from part of the former province of Franche-Comté. The frontiers of the new department corresponded approximately to those of the old Bailiwick of Amont.

The department was also marked by the Franco-Prussian War with the battles of Héricourt, and Villersexel but also the proximity of the Siege of Belfort. The department welcomed Alsatians fleeing the annexation of Alsace-Lorraine.

The Franco-Prussian war in Haute-Saône

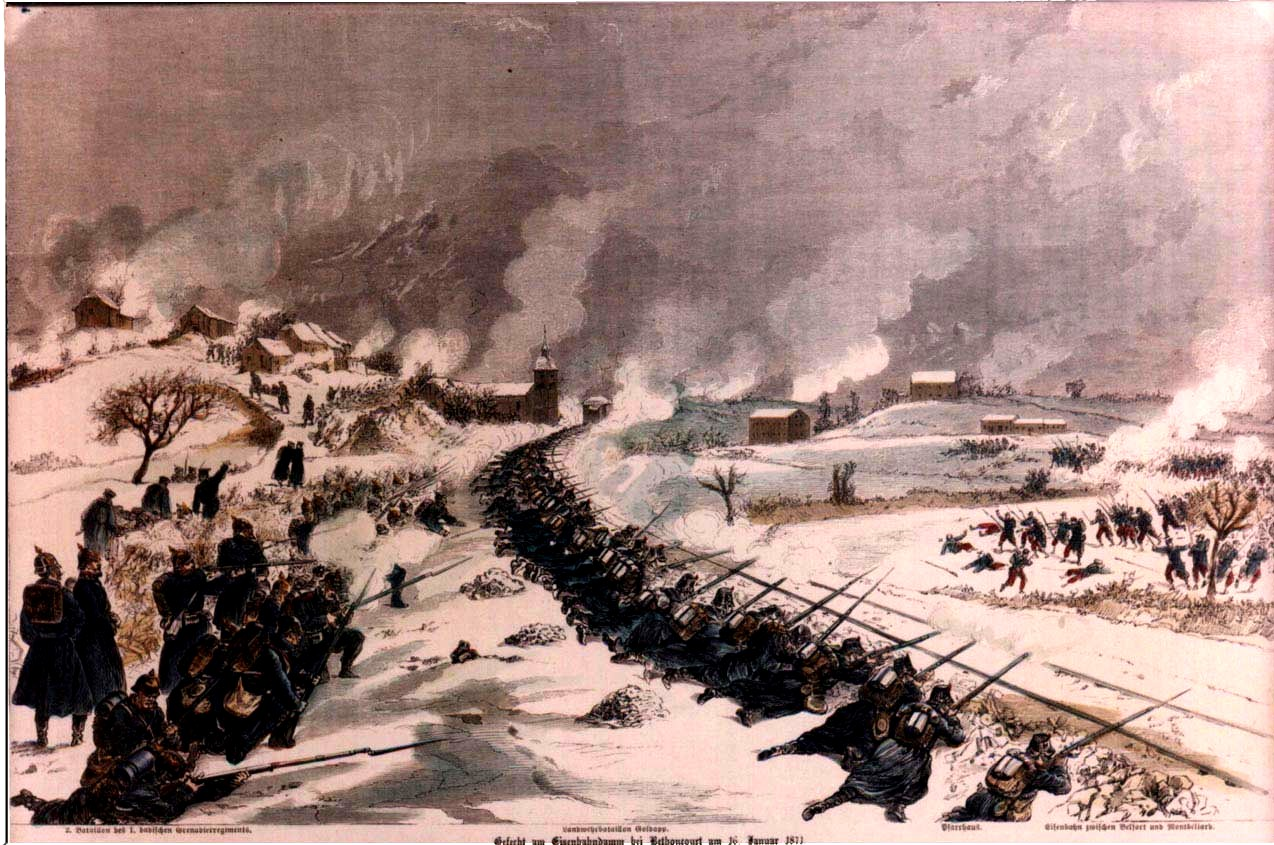
Battle of the Lisaine

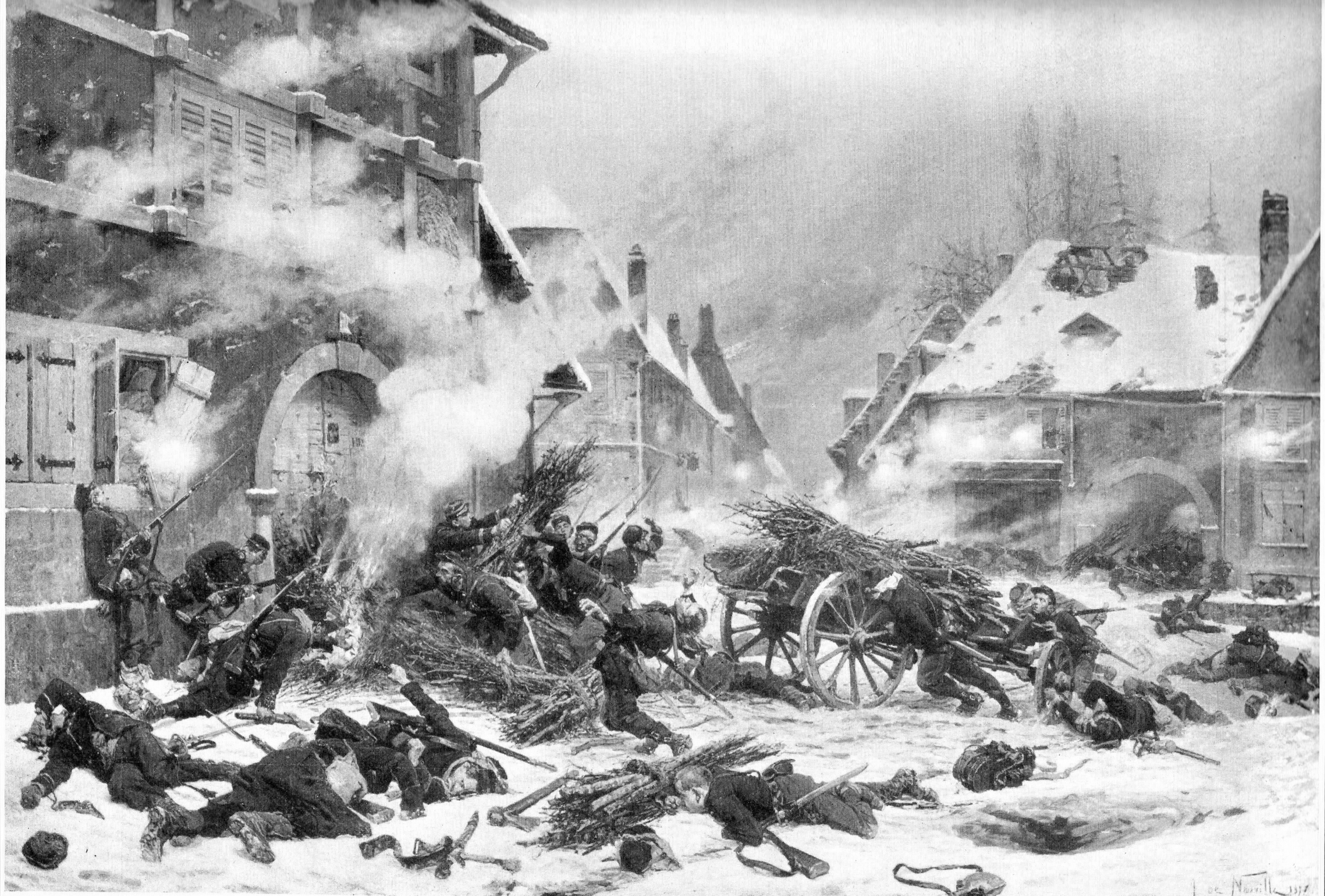
Battle of Villersexel

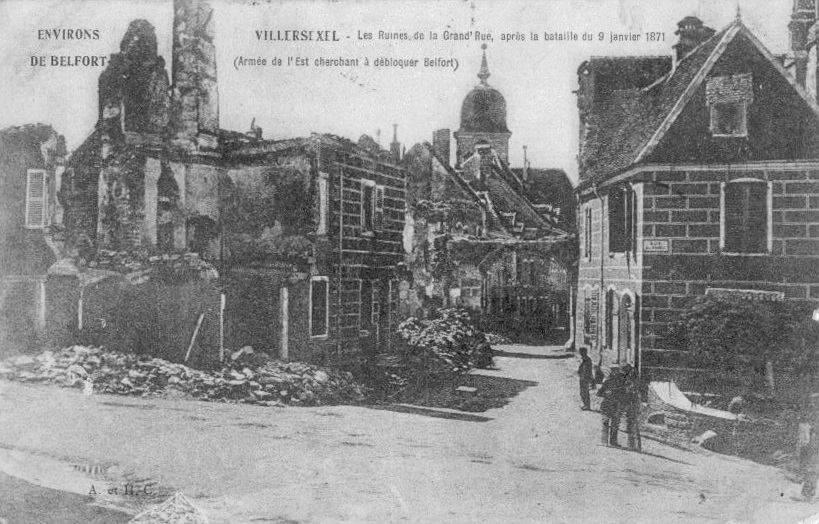
View of the destruction of Bourg de Villersexel

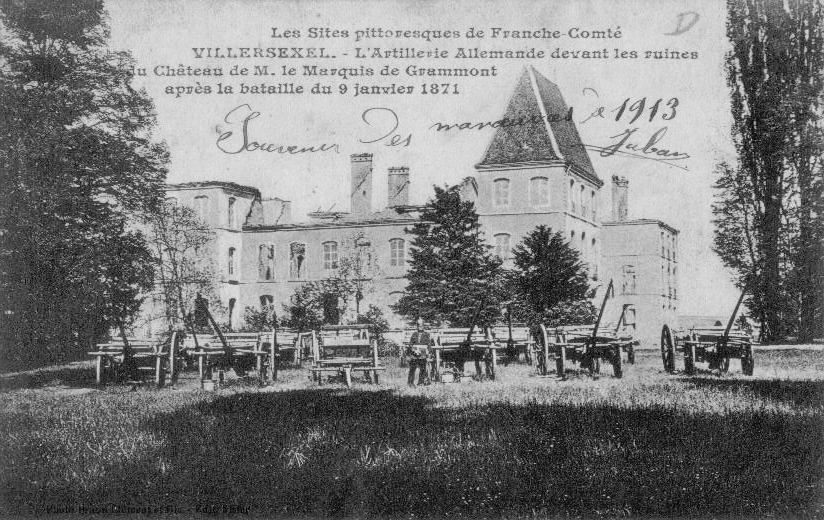
German artillery in front of the ruins of castle of Villersexel

The department has an important mining and industrial past (coal, salt, iron, lead-silver-copper mines, bituminous shale, stationery, spinning, weaving, forges, foundries, tileries, mechanical factories).

Emblematic industries of Haute-Saône

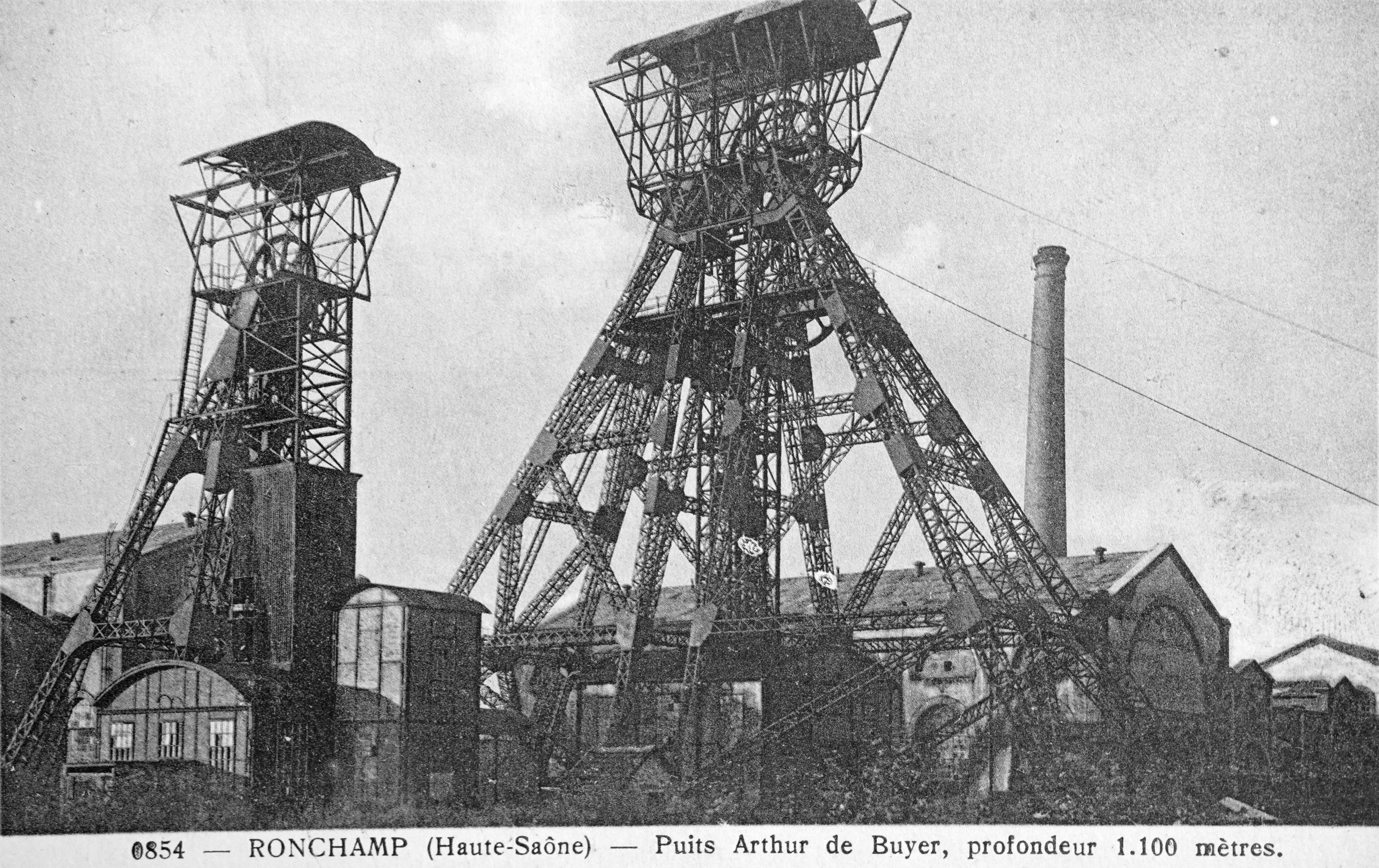
Arthur de Buyer Coal Mine (1.010 m) the deepest coal mine in France between 1900 and 1910

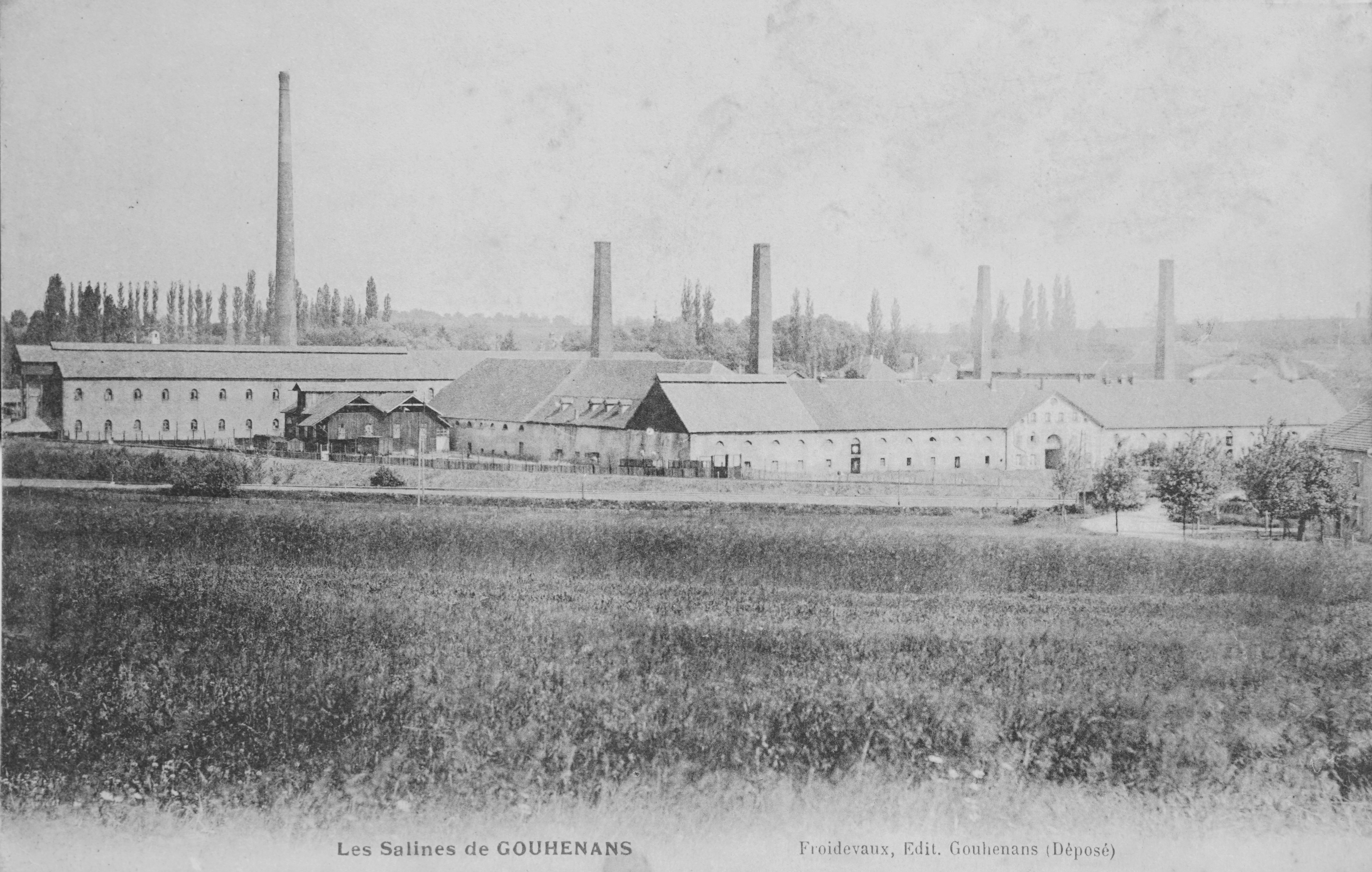
Gouhenans Saltworks is one of the most important saltworks in France in the 19th century

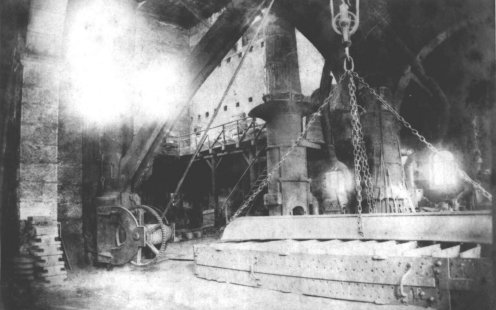
Interior view of the Varigney factory (Dampierre-lès-Conflans), the iron industry was developed until the middle of the 20th century

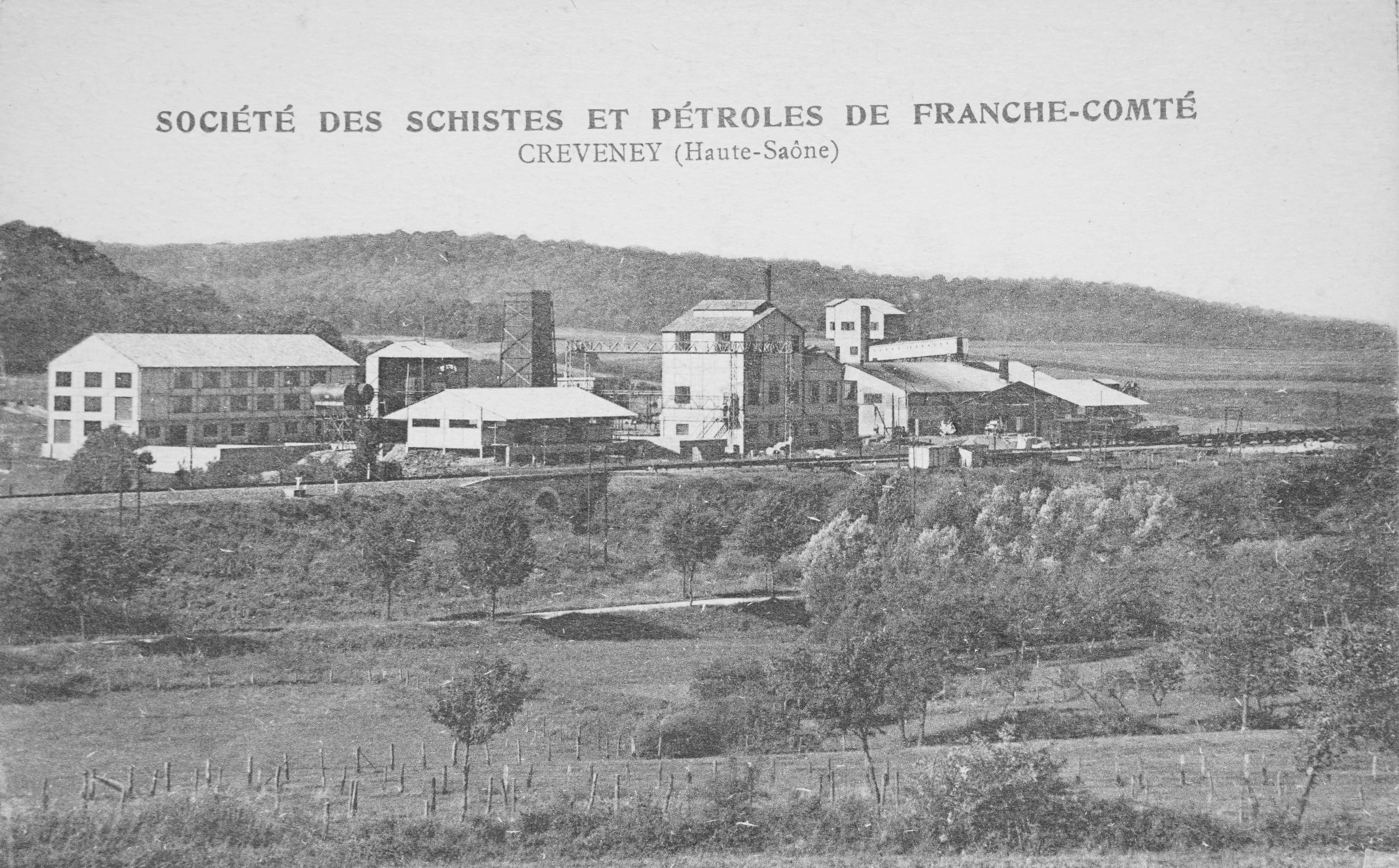
Creveney bituminous shale distillation plant, a rare operation in France between the two world wars

== Administration ==
Haute-Saône Map

Haute-Saône is part of the Bourgogne-Franche-Comté region, and is divided into 2 arrondissements and 17 cantons.

The cantons are:

- Dampierre-sur-Salon
- Gray
- Héricourt-1
- Héricourt-2
- Jussey
- Lure-1
- Lure-2
- Luxeuil-les-Bains
- Marnay
- Mélisey
- Port-sur-Saône
- Rioz
- Saint-Loup-sur-Semouse
- Scey-sur-Saône-et-Saint-Albin
- Vesoul-1
- Vesoul-2
- Villersexel

== Geography ==
Neighbouring departments are Côte-d'Or to the west, Haute-Marne to the north-west, Vosges to the north, Territoire de Belfort to the east, Doubs to the south and east and Jura to south. The commune of Champlitte is the largest commune in this department, with an area of 128 km^{2} (49 sq mi).

The department can be presented as a transitional territory positioned between several of the more depressed departments of eastern France and the so-called Blue Banana zone characterised, in recent decades by relatively powerful economic growth.

Landscape

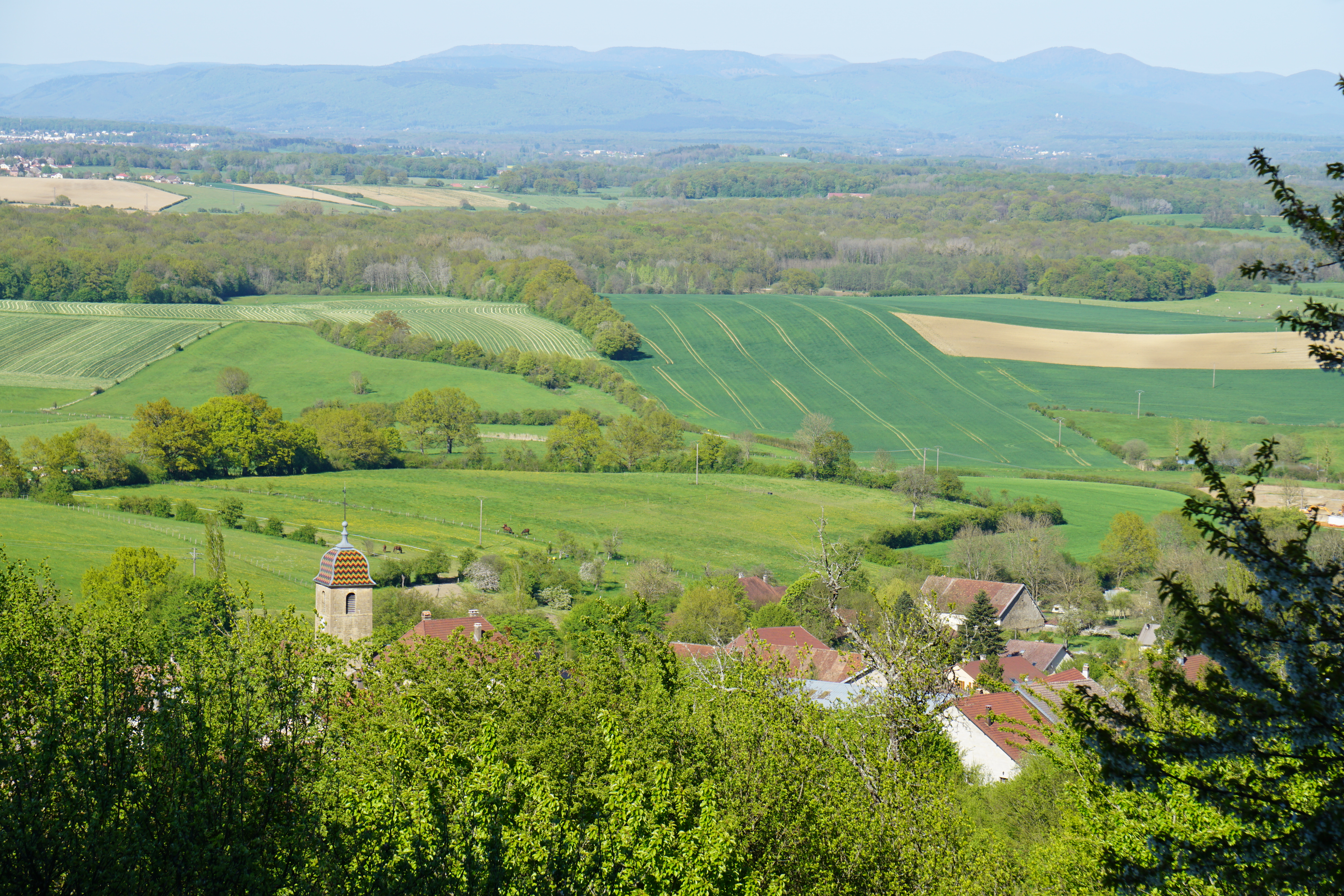
The country of Lure and the Vosges in the east of the department

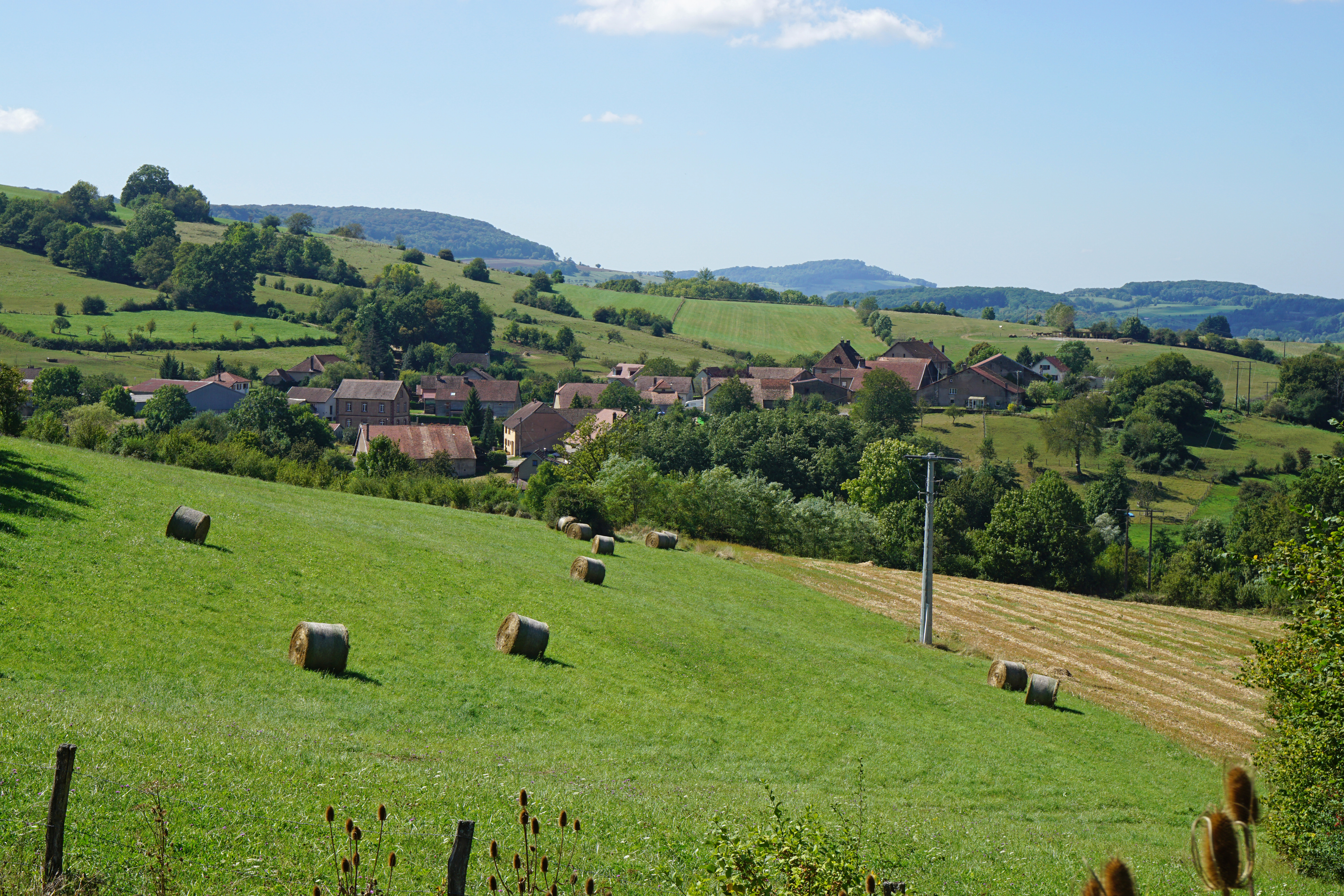
Landscape in the southeast

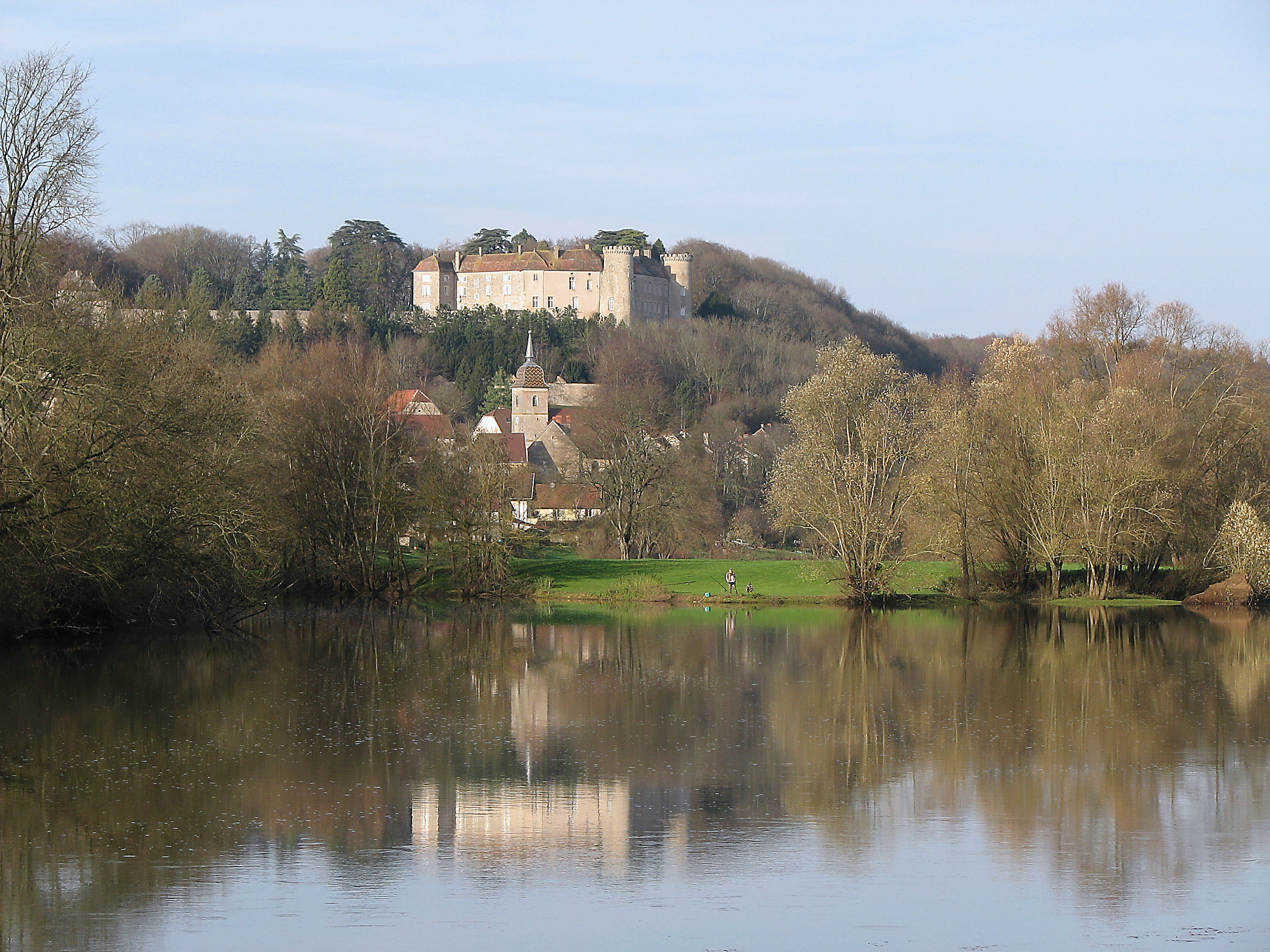
Ray-sur-Saône in the west of the department

== Economy ==
The department is overwhelmingly rural, despite the area having been at the forefront of industrialisation in the eighteenth century. The industrial tradition remains, but industrial businesses tend to be on a small scale. In 2006 employment by economic sector was reported as follows:

* Agriculture 4,919 employees
* Construction 4,504 employees
* Industrial sector 18,747 employees
* Service sector 44,865 employees

== Demographics ==
Historical population

Year	Pop.	±% p.a.
1801	291,579	—
1821	308,171	+0.28%
1831	338,910	+0.96%
1841	347,627	+0.25%
1851	347,469	−0.00%
1861	317,183	−0.91%
1872	303,088	−0.41%
1881	295,905	−0.27%
1891	280,856	−0.52%
1901	266,605	−0.52%
1911	257,606	−0.34%
1921	228,348	−1.20%
1931	219,257	−0.41%

Year	Pop.	±% p.a.
1936	212,829	−0.59%
1946	202,573	−0.49%
1954	209,303	+0.41%
1962	208,440	−0.05%
1968	214,396	+0.47%
1975	222,254	+0.52%
1982	231,962	+0.61%
1990	229,650	−0.13%
1999	229,732	+0.00%
2007	237,197	+0.40%
2012	239,750	+0.21%
2017	236,659	−0.26%
2023	233,185	−0.25%

In common with many rural departments in France, Haute-Saône has experienced a savage reduction in population, from nearly 350,000 in the middle of the nineteenth century to barely 200,000 on the eve of the Second World War, as people migrated to newly industrialising population centres, often outside Metropolitan France.

During the second half of the twentieth century the mass mobility conferred by the surge in automobile ownership permitted some recovery of the population figure to approximately 234,000 in 2004.

=== Principal towns ===
The rural nature of the department is highlighted by the absence of large towns and cities. Even the department's capital, Vesoul, still has a population below 20,000. As of 2023, there are 5 communes with more than 5,000 inhabitants:

Commune	Population (2023)
Vesoul	15,078
Héricourt	10,621
Lure	7,877
Luxeuil-les-Bains	6,663
Gray	5,365

== Politics ==
The president of the Departmental Council is Yves Krattinger, first elected in 2001.

=== Current National Assembly Representatives ===
Constituency	Member	Party
Haute-Saône's 1st constituency	Antoine Villedieu	National Rally
Haute-Saône's 2nd constituency	Emeric Salmon	National Rally

== Tourism ==
Notre-Dame du Haut by Le Corbusier (UNESCO)

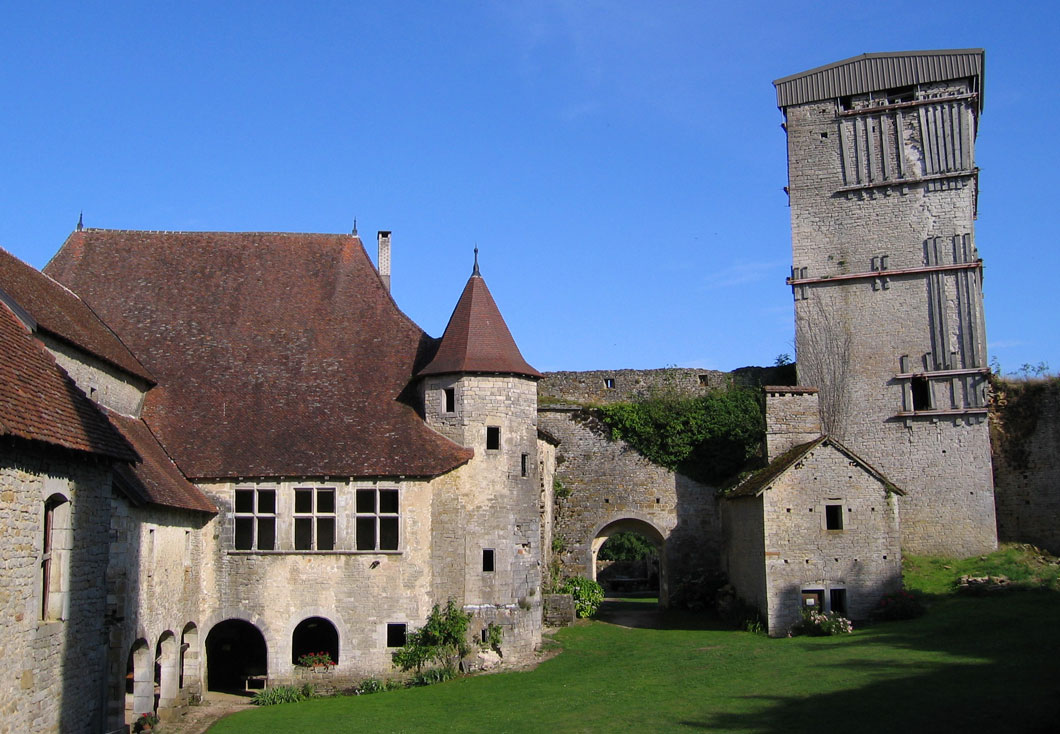
Château d'Oricourt

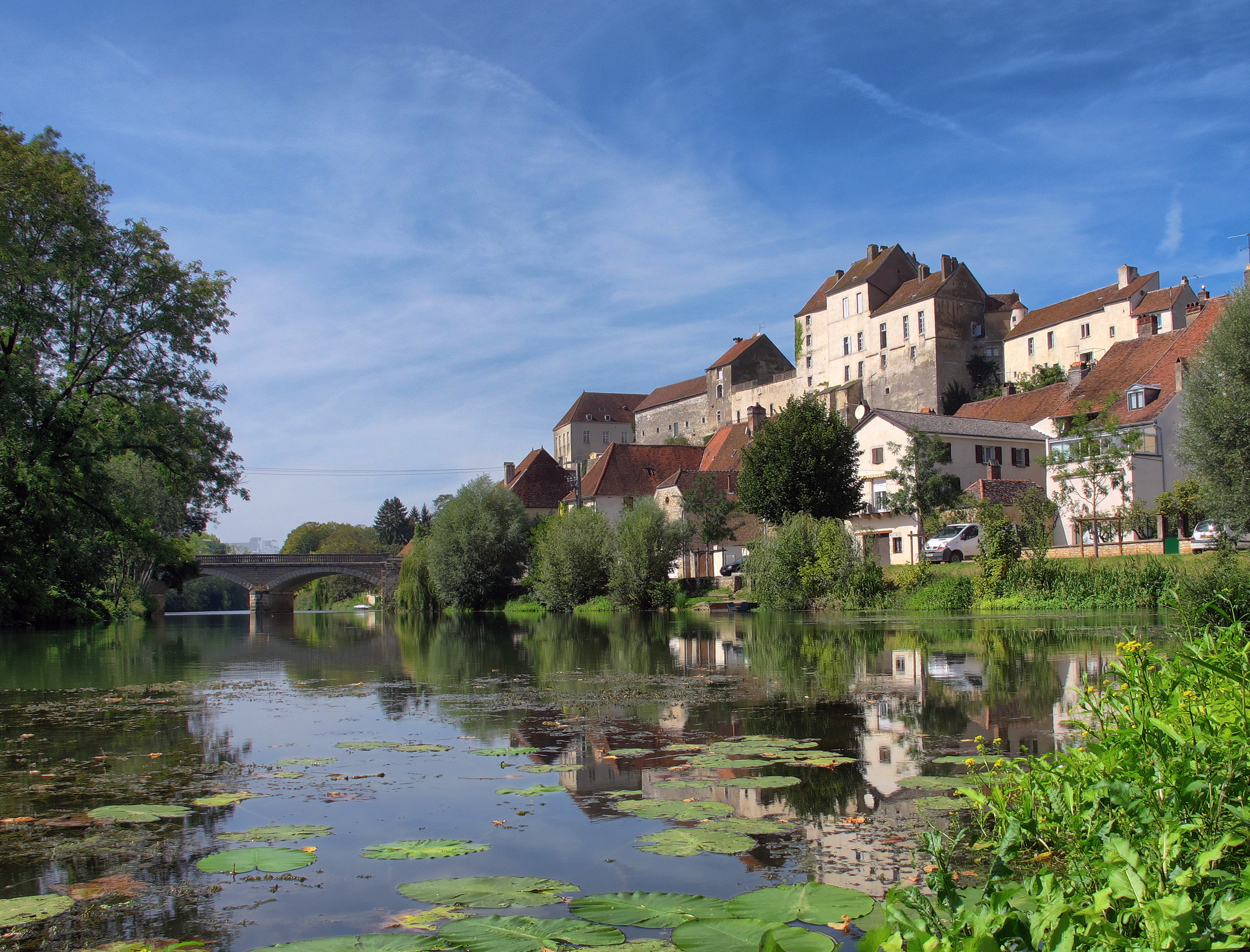
Pesmes

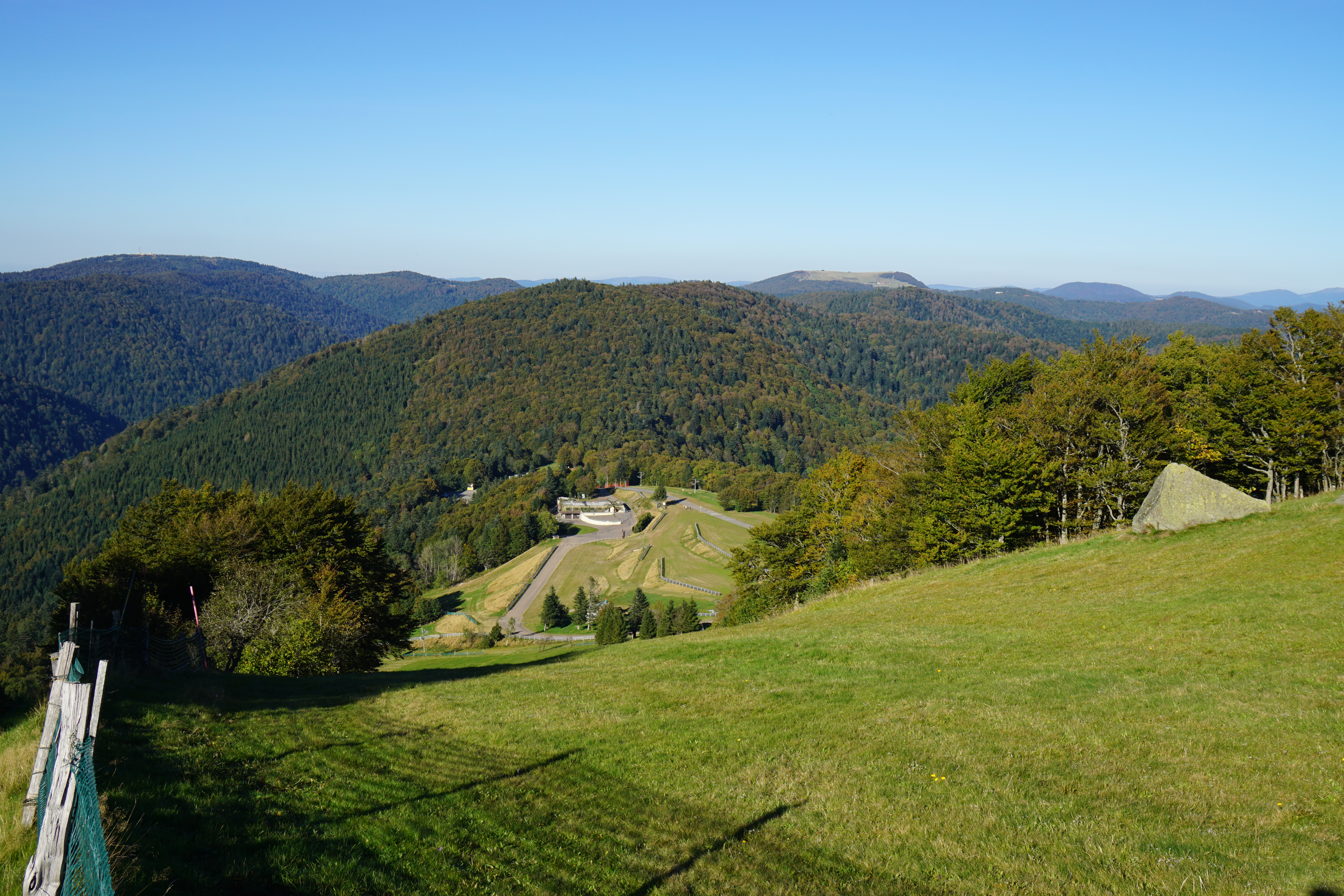
La Planche des Belles Filles (Tour de France)

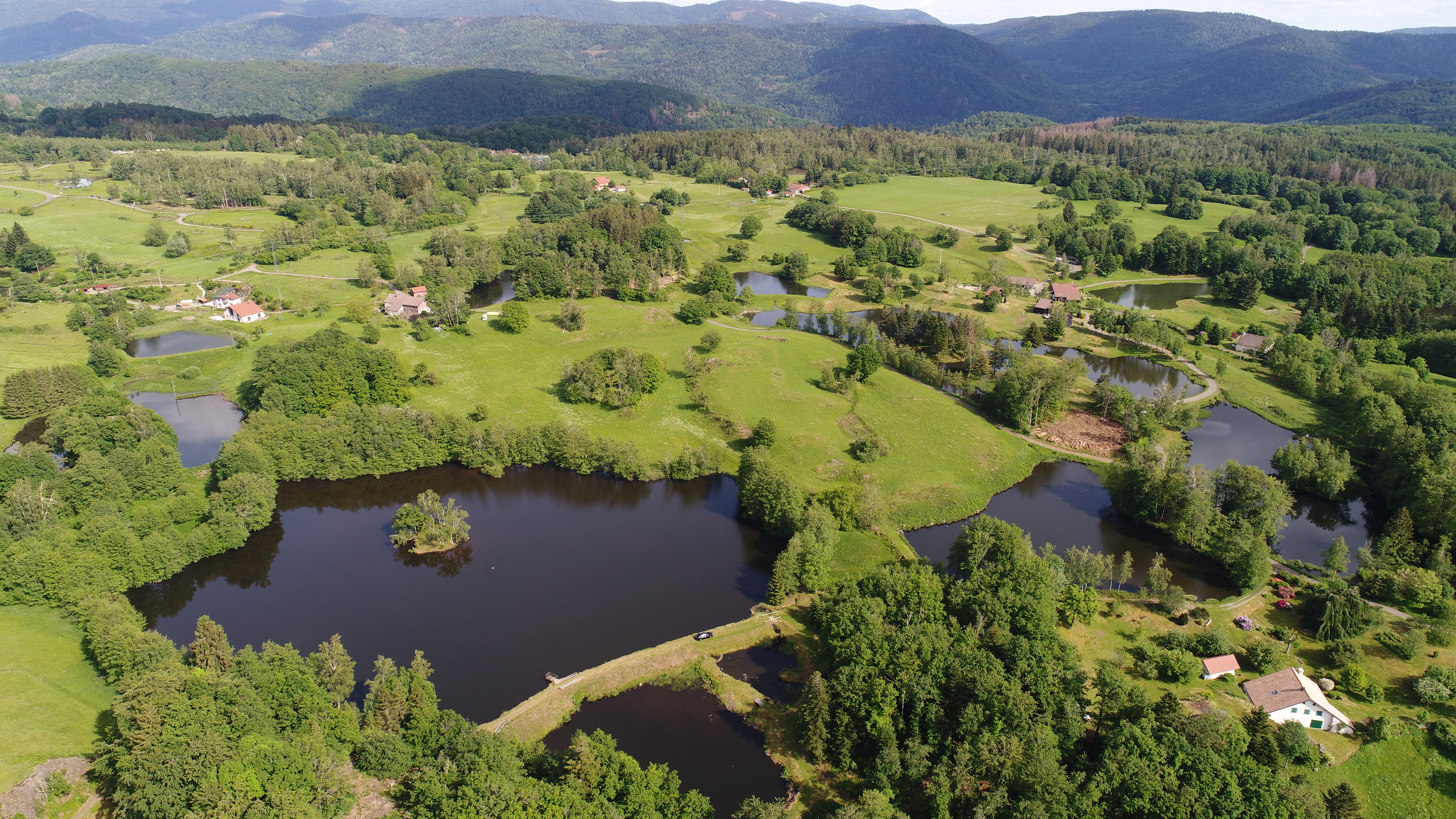
Landscape of Plateau des Mille Étangs

== See also ==
- County of Burgundy - History
- Franche-Comté
- Cantons of the Haute-Saône department
- Communes of the Haute-Saône department
- Arrondissements of the Haute-Saône department
- Arpitan language
